= List of South African artists =

The following list of South African artists (in alphabetical order by last name) includes artists of various genres, who are notable and are either born in South Africa, of South African descent or who produce works that are primarily about South Africa.

== A ==
- Larry Abramson (born 1954), South African-born Israeli artist
- Igshaan Adams (born 1982), textile artist
- Valerie Adler, painter and designer
- Bill Ainslie (1934–1989)
- Jane Alexander (born 1959)
- Siemon Allen (born 1971)
- Tyrone Appollis (born 1957)
- Dieter Aschenborn (1915–2002), Namibian-born
- Hans Aschenborn (1888–1931), German-born
- Uli Aschenborn (born 1947)
- Leigh Ashton (born 1956)

== B ==
- Beezy Bailey (born 1962)
- Kenneth Baker (1921–1996)
- Beverly Barkat (born 1966), South-African born Israeli visual artist
- Walter Battiss (1906–1982)
- Janko de Beer (born 1980)
- Charles Davidson Bell (1813–1882), Scottish-born painter, artist and stamp designer
- Deborah Bell (born 1957), sculptor, painter and mixed media artist
- Willie Bester (born 1956)
- Doris Bloom (born 1954), painter; incorporates performance art into her work
- Harry Bolus (1834–1911), botanist, botanical artist, businessman and philanthropist
- D. C. Boonzaier (1865–1950)
- Gregoire Boonzaier (1909–2005)
- Dineo Seshee Bopape (born 1981)
- Steven Bosch (born 1978)
- Cristina Boshoff (born 1980), singer
- Willem Boshoff (born 1951)
- Wim Botha (born 1974)
- Candice Breitz (born 1972)
- Lisa Brice (born 1968)
- Lesley-Ann Brandt, South African-American painter and visual artist (born 1981)
- Rhona Brown (1922–2014), botanical artist
- Winifred Brunton (1880–1959), painter, especially of Egyptian pharaohs

== C ==
- Sarah Calburn (born 1964)
- Norman Catherine (born 1949)
- Bettie Cilliers-Barnard (1914–2010)
- Frans Claerhout, Belgian (1919–2006)
- Julia Rosa Clark (born 1975)
- Peter Clarke (1929–2014)
- Christo Coetzee (1929–2000)
- Ernest Cole (1940–1990)
- Gillian Condy (born 1952), botanical artist
- Ben Jay Crossman (born 1979)
- Tom Cullberg (born 1972)

== D ==
- Nerine Desmond (1908–1993)
- Mbali Dhlamini (born 1990), photographer
- Adriaan Diedericks (born 1990), sculptor
- Ethel May Dixie (1876–1973), botanical artist
- Marlene Dumas (born 1953)

== E ==
- Peter Eastman (born 1976)
- Fanie Eloff (1885–1947), sculptor
- Paul Emsley (born 1947), British portrait painter and lecturer
- Garth Erasmus (born 1956)

== F ==
- Dumile Feni (1939–1991), sculptor and printmaker
- Cyril Fradan (1928–1997), artist and designer, especially of acrylic paints incorporating various glazing techniques
- Abrie Fourie (born 1969), artist specialising in photography and digital media

== G ==
- Kendell Geers (born 1968)
- Michael Gitlin (born 1943), South African-born Israeli contemporary sculptor
- Allerley Glossop (1870–1955)
- David Goldblatt (1930–2018)
- Arthur Goldreich, South African-Israeli abstract painter (1929–1982)
- Frances Goodman (born 1975)

== H ==
- Caesar Carl Hans Henkel (1839–1913), German-born South African forester, cartographer, painter, soldier and botanist
- Matthew Hindley (born 1974)
- Nicholas Hlobo (born 1975), sculptor
- Robert Hodgins (1920–2010), English-born South African painter and printmaker
- Rosa Hope (1902–1972), English-born South African painter
- Pieter Hugo (born 1976), photographer

== J ==
- Gavin Jantjes (born 1948), painter
- Barbara Jeppe (1921–1999), botanical artist
- Gabriel de Jongh (1913–2004), Dutch-born South African painter
- Tinus de Jongh (1885–1942), painter

== K ==
- Nadav Kander (born 1961), photographer
- Anton Kannemeyer (born 1967)
- Hanns Katz (1892–1940), expressionist painter and graphic artist
- William Kentridge (born 1955)
- Wolf Kibel (1903–1938)
- David Koloane (1938–2019)
- Moses Kottler (1896–1977), painter and sculptor
- Ansel Krut (born 1959), painter based in London, UK
- David Kuijers (born 1962), painter, designer and illustrator

== L ==
- Erik Laubscher (1927–2013), painter
- Maggie Laubser (1886–1973), painter, printmaker
- Jimmy Law (born 1970), painter, sculptor
- Ralph Lazar (born 1967) illustrator, writer
- Cythna Letty (1895–1985), botanical artist
- Carla Liesching (born 1985)
- Lippy Lipshitz (1903–1980), sculptor, painter, and printmaker
- Kai Lossgott (born 1980)

== M ==
- Noria Mabasa (born 1938)
- Ayanda Mabulu (born 1981)
- Fikile Magadlela (1952–2003)
- Esther Mahlangu (born 1935)
- Billy Mandindi (1967–2005)
- Anja Marais (born 1974)
- Amitabh Mitra (born 1955), Indian-born South Aftican painter, physician
- Louis Maqhubela (born 1939)
- Gerhard Marx (born 1976)
- Judith Mason (1938–2016), painter, sculptor and installation artist
- Kagiso Patrick Mautloa (born 1952)
- Johannes Petrus Meintjes (1923–1980), artist, author and historian
- John Meyer (born 1942), painter
- Gladys Mgudlandlu (1917—1979)
- Anthony Morton (1923–2006)
- Nandipha Mntambo (born 1982)
- Santu Mofokeng (1956–2020)
- Zwelethu Mthethwa (born 1960), painter and photographer
- Zanele Muholi (born 1972)
- Brett Murray (born 1961)
- Credo Mutwa (1921–2020)

== N ==
- Hermann Niebuhr (born 1972), painter of primarily urban and rural landscapes
- Zelda Nolte (1929–2003), South African-British sculptor and woodblock printmaker
- Neo Ntsoma (born 1972), photographer
- Gabisile Nkosi (1974–2008), artist and printmaker
- Thenjiwe Nkosi (born 1980), South African-American

== O ==
- Johan Oldert (1912–1984), painter and sculptor
- Ken Oosterbroek (1963–1994), photographer

== P ==
- Karabo Poppy (born 1992)
- Georgia Papageorge (born 1941)
- Charles Ernest Peers (1875–1944)
- George Pemba (1912–2001)
- Peet Pienaar (born 1971)
- Jacobus Hendrik Pierneef (1886–1957)
- Barbara Pike (born 1933), botanical artist
- Stanley Pinker (1924–2012)
- Deborah Poynton (born 1970)
- Alexis Preller (1911–1975)

== R ==
- Gavin Rain (born 1971)
- Jo Ratcliffe
- Robin Rhode (born 1976)
- Dolf Rieser (1898–1983), South African-born British painter, printmaker, and teacher
- Tracey Rose (born 1974)
- David Rosen (1959–2014)
- Harold Rubin (1932–2020), South African-born Israeli artist
- Athi-Patra Ruga (born 1984)

== S ==
- Lesley Sachs (born 1958), South African- born Israeli figurative artist
- Ruth Sacks (born 1977)
- Claudette Schreuders (born 1973)
- Richard Scott (born 1968)
- Berni Searle (born 1964)
- Gerard Sekoto (1913–1993)
- Lerato Shadi (born 1979)
- Mary Sibande (born 1982)
- Lucky Sibiya (1942–1999)
- Penny Siopis (born 1953)
- Lucas Sithole (1931–1994)
- Cecil Skotnes (1926–2009)
- Sean Slemon (born 1978)
- Jo Smail (born 1943), South Africa-born American
- Abraham de Smidt (1829–1908)
- Frank Sydney Spears (1906–1991)
- Irma Stern (1894–1966)
- Paul Stopforth (born 1945)
- Mikhael Subotzky (born 1981)
- Lisa Swerling (born 1972), South African/British
- Helen Sebidi (born 1943)

== T ==
- Guy Tillim (born 1962), photographer
- Vladimir Tretchikoff (1913–2006)
- Lawrence Holme Twentyman (1783–1852), silversmith

== U ==
- Jeannette Unite (born 1964), Earth artist who paints and draws with minerals and mining detritus from the "Industrial Sublime"

== V ==
- Strijdom van der Merwe (born 1961), land artist
- Vivian van der Merwe (born 1956), still life artist
- Maurice van Essche (1906–1977), Belgian-born South African painter, oil, gouache, acrylic and water-color; inspired by time in Belgian Congo (1939), inter alia
- Anton van Wouw (1862–1945), Dutch-born South African sculptor
- Nontsikelelo (Lolo) Veleko (born 1977)
- Jan Vermeiren (born 1949), paintings mainly in oil on canvas, etchings and lithography
- Diane Victor (born 1964)
- Karlien de Villiers (born 1975)
- Jan Ernst Abraham Volschenk (1853–1936), landscape painter

== W ==
- Jeremy Wafer (born 1953)
- Donovan Ward (born 1962)
- Ellaphie Ward-Hilhorst (1920–1994), botanical artist
- James Webb (born 1975)
- Jean Welz (1900–1975)
- Sue Williamson (born 1941)
- Isaac Witkin (1936–2006), modern sculptor

== Z ==
- Cynthia Zukas (1931– 2024), painter

== Bibliography ==
- Sue Williamson and Ashraf Jamal, Art in South Africa: the future present, Publisher David Philip (Cape Town), 1996.
- Frank Herreman and Mark D'Amato, Liberated voices: contemporary art from South Africa, The Museum for African Art, 1999.
- Emma Bedford and Sophie Perryer, 10 Years 100 Artists: Art In A Democratic South Africa, Struik, 2004.
- Sue Williamson, South African Art Now, HarperCollins, 2009.
- Sue Williamson, Resistance Art in South Africa, Juta and Company Ltd, 2010.
- Berman, Esmé (2010). Art and Artists of South Africa. Cape Town: G3 Publishers. pp. 376–379. ISBN 978-1-86812-345-2.
- Three Centuries of South African Art: Fine Art, Architecture, Applied Arts, Hans Fransen (author) AD. Donker (Publisher), 1982
