= List of mixed-media artists =

This is a partial list of artists working in mixed media.

== A ==
- Arman
- Tal Avitzur

== B ==
- Romare Bearden
- Natasha Bowdoin
- Christian Boltanski
- Kate Borcherding
- Georges Braque
- Geta Bratescu
- Isabelle Brourman
- Fatma Bucak

== C ==
- Rhea Carmi
- Peter I. Chang
- The Connor Brothers
- Joseph Cornell

== D ==
- Edgar Degas
- Jim Dine
- Jesse Draxler
- Hubert Duprat
- Marcel Duchamp

== E ==
- Max Ernst

== F ==
- Abdala Faye
- Emma Ferreira
- Jane Frank

== G ==
- Lori K. Gordon
- Juan Gris
- Red Grooms
- Genco Gulan
- Ismail Gulgee

== H ==
- Dick Higgins
- Robert H. Hudson

== J ==
- Jasper Johns

== K ==
- Edward Kienholz
- Paul Klee
- Yves Klein
- Alison Knowles
- Kudzanai Chiurai

== L ==
- Marita Liulia
- Lennie Lee
- Courtney M. Leonard
- Minouk Lim

== M ==
- JG Mair
- Conrad Marca-Relli
- Jim McNitt
- Christina McPhee
- Annette Messager

== N ==
- Afshin Naghouni

== O ==
- Ahmet Ögüt
- Claes Oldenburg
- Méret Oppenheim

== P ==
- Patricia Piccinini
- Francis Picabia
- Pablo Picasso
- Nam June Paik
- Laure Prouvost
- Kim Prisu

== R ==
- Sara Rahbar
- Barbara Rapp
- Mary Curtis Ratcliff
- Robert Rauschenberg
- Man Ray
- Wendy Red Star
- Renee Richetts
- Diana Ringo
- Mateo Romero
- Bob Ross
- Anne Ryan

== S ==
- Kurt Schwitters
- Tanis Maria S'eiltin
- Hilary Simon
- Jo Smail
- Jack Smith
- Julian Schnabel
- Daniel Spoerri
- Warwick Saint

== T ==
- PINK de Thierry
- Jean Tinguely

== V ==
- Damien Valero
- Jacques Villeglé
- Wolf Vostell
- Bill Viola

== W ==
- Tom Wesselmann

== X ==
- Xu Jingyu
