= Dianne Durham =

American gymnast (1968–2021)

- Born: June 17, 1968 Gary, Indiana, U.S.
- Died: February 4, 2021 (aged 52) Chicago, Illinois, U.S.
- Spouse: Tom Drahozal

Gymnastics career
- Discipline: Women's artistic gymnastics
- Former coaches: Wanda Tommasi; Richard Del Gallo; Tony Ladner; Bill Sands; Béla Károlyi; Márta Károlyi
- Retired: 1985
Medal record
Competitions & Medals
| Gold medal – first place | 1981 Pennsylvania | All-around |
| Gold medal – first place | 1982 Pennsylvania | Vault |
| Gold medal – first place | 1982 Pennsylvania | Uneven bars |
| Gold medal – first place | 1983 Colorado | All-around |
| Gold medal – first place | 1983 Illinois | All-around |
| Gold medal – first place | 1983 Illinois | Balance beam |
| Gold medal – first place | 1983 Illinois | Floor exercise |
| Gold medal – first place | 1983 Illinois | Vault |
| Silver medal – second place | 1982 Pennsylvania | All-around |
| Silver medal – second place | 1983 Illinois | Uneven bars |
| Silver medal – second place | 1984 Illinois | Vault |
| Bronze medal – third place | 1984 New York | All-around |
| Bronze medal – third place | 1984 Illinois | Uneven bars |

Dianne Patrice Durham (June 17, 1968 – February 4, 2021) was an American artistic gymnast. In 1983, she won the all-around senior title at the women's US National Championships, becoming the first African American athlete to do so. She was Béla and Márta Károlyi's first elite athlete in the United States, helping establish their coaching credentials outside of the state-sponsored program of their native Romania, and trained with Mary Lou Retton, who called Durham her "best competition". After injuries and competition stipulations prevented her from competing in the 1984 Summer Olympics, Durham retired from competition in 1985. She later ran the Skyline Gymnastics school in Chicago.

== Life in gymnastics ==
Dianne Patrice Durham was born June 17, 1968, in Gary, Indiana, to parents Ural, the director of industrial relations at a steel mill, and Calvinita, a schoolteacher. Dianne and her sister, Alice, were enrolled in gymnastics at a young age so that they would "stop wrecking the house." Durham received her early training under Wanda Tommasi-Mohoi in Merrillville, Indiana.

=== Early career ===
Durham began gymnastics at the age of four and at nine years old was included in Ebony Jr! magazine in an article titled “Look Out For These Shining Stars”. On her first gymnastics team, the Hoosierettes, her coaches, Wanda Tommasi and Richard Del Gallo, described Durham as “Olympic material”. At 11, she attempted to retire from gymnastics in a letter to her parents. However, she remained in the sport and later became the youngest member of the Károlyis' team at age 14.

=== Training with the Károlyis ===
In 1981, after winning the junior elite all-around title at the US National Championships, she moved to Houston, Texas, to be coached by Béla and Márta Károlyi. She initially went for a try-out, but packed with no intention of returning. Tommasi encouraged the move, telling Durham's mother that Dianne was an Olympic-caliber gymnast and needed elite facilities to realize her potential. One of six initial gymnasts the Károlyis selected for their training program, Durham became their first elite gymnast in the United States. They had defected from Romania in 1981 and, though they had trained the star of the 1976 Olympic gymnastics competition, Nadia Comăneci, they had doubts about whether they could succeed outside Romania's state-supported program. Durham's success quickly made them a presence at major competitions again.

Durham initially lived with the Károlyis in Houston, then with a host family. Her mother joined her, but her father stayed in Gary so her sister could finish high school.

=== Competitive career ===
Durham successfully defended her junior national all-around title in 1982, and had a breakout performance at the United States Gymnastics Federation international invitation, tying for the all-around title with teammate Kathy Johnson in Durham's first major international meet. In 1983 she won the senior all-around title at the US National Championships, the first African American in women's gymnastics to take this title. She also won the individual titles for bars, floor and vault, becoming the first American woman to execute a full-twisting layout Tsukahara on vault. Durham said later that despite these historic achievements, she was most concerned with them as part of her road to the Olympics, her ultimate goal.

Later that year Durham won the all-around title at the McDonalds International Gymnastics Championships, beating Mary Lou Retton, who was also coached by the Károlyis. The two were friends, but Retton also described Durham as her "best competition". Injuries prevented Durham from competing in the 1983 World Artistic Gymnastics Championships.

When she returned from rehabbing her injuries, she felt cast aside at the gym and in February 1984, Durham left the Károlyi program to train with Scott Krause in Fort Worth, Texas. But after a weak showing at the US Nationals, Károlyi approached her with an invitation to return, which she accepted in the run-up to the Olympic trials.

At the US team trials for the 1984 Summer Olympics, Durham was in sixth place after the first day. Competing for one of seven slots, she was expected to make the team and become the first Black gymnast to compete for the United States at the Olympics, as Luci Collins had made the team but did not have the chance to compete due to the US boycott of the Moscow Olympic Games. However Durham injured her ankle on vault and withdrew from the competition, on the expectation she would to be petitioned onto the Olympic team. She only learned later that she was ineligible because she had not competed at the 1983 World Championship, and expressed regret no one had told her that finishing the trials on an injured ankle was her only route to the Olympics. Károlyi objected to denying the prior year's national champion a slot on the team: "She was the first Black kid to ever make it to a national title. This is a pretty big injustice to not have Durham on the Olympic team. The team needs her, the country needs her." But he did not succeed in persuading the USA Gymnastics Federation. Durham retired from competition in 1985 at 16 years old.

Years on USA Senior National Team- 1983–1985 Years on USA Junior National Team- 1981–1982 Gymnastics Training Background- (Gyms trained at and primary coaches) Wanda's School of Gymnastic's, Primary Coach- Wanda Mohai, 7 Years. Mid-America Twisters, Primary Coach- Bill Sands, 2 years. Gymkhana, Primary Coach- Tony Ladner, 1 year. Karolyi's, Primary Coach- Bela and Martha Karolyi, 4 years. USGF All-around Championships- 1983 Senior All-around Champion, 1981 and 1982 Junior All-around Champion World Championships- Dianne Durham was selected as a member of the 1983 World Championship Team. However, due to an injury she was not able to compete at the World Championships.

National Competitions- 1984 Olympic Trials, Jacksonville, FL 1984 McDonald's Championships of the USA, Evanston, IL, 7th-AA 1984 USGF U.S. Classic, Niagara Falls, NY, 3rd(t)-AA 1983 World Championships Team Trials, Eugene, OR, 2nd-AA* 1983 McDonald's Championships of the USA, Chicago, IL, 1st-AA, 1st BB, FX, V 2nd(t)-UB 1983 Caesar's Palace Invitational, Las Vegas, NV, 2nd-AA 1983 USGF U.S. Classic, Colorado Springs, CO, 1st-AA 1983 USGF American Classic, Colorado Springs, CO, 3rd-AA 1982 Junior Championships of the USA, Allentown, PA, 1st-AA 1982 Single Elimination Championships, Reno, NV, 2nd-AA 1982 USGF U.S. Classic, Philadelphia, PA, 2nd-AA, 1st-V, UB (Juniors) 1981 Junior Elite Team Trials, 2nd-AA, 1st-V, FX, 2nd-UB 1981 Junior Championships of the USA, Bethlehem, PA, 1st-AA 1981 1st Elite Nationals, 2nd-AA

- Dianne Durham did not compete in the World Championships Team Trials, but due to the selection procedure the percentage of her score from the Championships of the USA was high enough to rank her second.

International Competitions- 1984 McDonald's USA vs. PR China, Honolulu, Hawaii, 1st-AA, 1st-FX, 1st(t)-V, 2nd-BB, 1st-Team 1984 International Mixed-Pairs, (with Laurent Barbieri of France), Bethlehem, PA, 5th-AA 1984 McDonald's American Cup, New York, NY 1984 Hong Kong Invitational, Hong Kong, (injured-incomplete score) 1983 Chunichi Cup, Nagoya, Japan, 3rd-AA, 2nd(t)-BB, 5th-UB 1983 Tokyo Invitational, Tokyo, Japan, 5th-UB, 9th-BB 1983 McDonald's International Invitational, (Pre-Olympic Competition), Los Angeles, CA, 1st-AA, 2nd-UB 1983 International Mixed-Pairs, (with Jim Hartung), Jacksonville, FL, 8th-AA 1982 Chunichi Cup, Nagoya, Japan, 10th-AA, 1st-V, 3rd-UB 1982 International Invitational, Fort Worth, TX, 1st(t)-AA, 1st-V, 5th(t)-UB 1982 Gymnast Friendship Championships, Beijing, PRC, 3rd-AA with FRG and PRC 1982 USA vs. Japan, Hamamatsu, Japan, 3rd-AA 1981 USA vs. Canada, Junior Invitational, Cambridge, Ontario, Canada 1981 International Mixed Pairs, Jacksonville, FL 1981 South African Invitational, Sanlam Cup, Capetown and Johannesburg, South Africa, 1st-AA

=== Later career and legacy ===
After leaving competition, Durham became a coach, both for the Károlyis and at the University of Illinois at Chicago as well as performed in professional shows. Later, she owned and operated a gymnastics school, Skyline Gymnastics, on Chicago's North Side, for seventeen years. She also became a gymnastics judge, coach and motivational speaker.

At the 1992 Summer Olympics held in Barcelona, Spain, Durham participated as a performer.

In 2015, she was inducted into the Indiana Gymnastics Hall of Fame. In 2017, she was inducted to the U.S. Gymnastics Regional Hall of Fame. In 2021, she posthumously was inducted into the USA Gymnastics Hall of Fame. In 2023, she was inducted into the Gary, Indiana Sports Hall of Fame.

Durham was featured in a 2020 work by Johannesburg-based artist Thenjiwe Nkosi. The video piece, entitled "Suspension", cut together footage of Black elite gymnasts from all over the world in the moments just before their routines commenced; Durham, shown posed just before her floor routine, with arms folded across her face, is the opening image. The New York Times review called the piece "sublime" and "the drop-everything-and-stream-it-now achievement of [the] video exhibition" in which it was presented.

Several accomplished Black gymnasts have noted Dianne Durham as a source of inspiration. At her memorial service, Simone Biles, Betty Okino, and Gabby Douglas cited Durham's contributions to gymnasts as a catalyst to their own careers. Biles states "Dianne really paved the way for Black gymnasts like me." Similarly, Douglas describes her as a trailblazer and Okino attributed the current representation in gymnastics to Durham's contributions.

== Personal life ==
As of 2012, Durham lived in Chicago with husband Tom Drahozal, whom she married in 1994.

Dianne P Durham died after a short illness at a Chicago hospital, surrounded by family, on February 4, 2021.

Dianne is the aunt of Michael Woods II, who plays professional football for the Cleveland Browns.
