= Warwick Saint =

South African artist (born 1972)

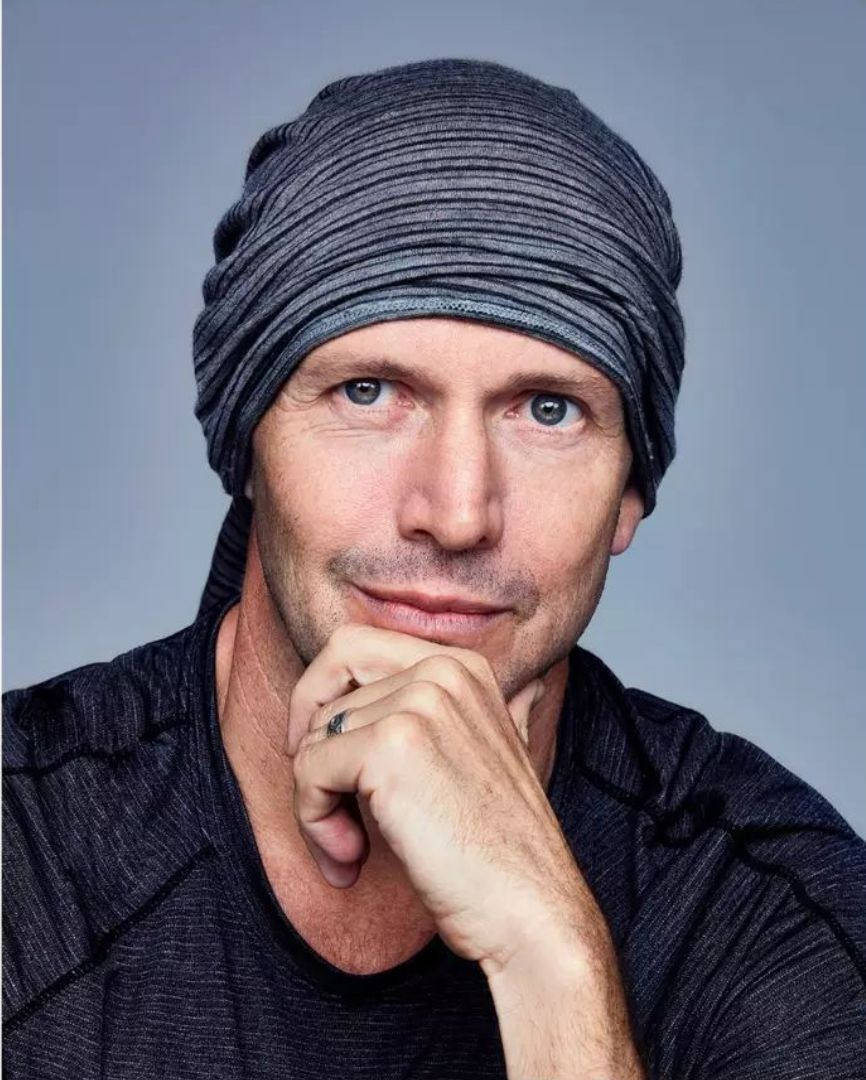
- Born: 9 January 1972 (age 54); South Africa
- Occupations: Painter, photographer
- Awards: Hasselblad Masters Award

Warwick Saint (born 9 January 1972) is a painter, photographer, and mixed-media artist from South Africa.

== Early life and education ==
Saint was born in 1972.

== Career ==
Saint is known for his portraits of A-list celebrities, including Drew Barrymore, Jared Leto, Cate Blanchett, Beyoncé, Charlize Theron, Christina Aguilera, and P.Diddy.

He has worked for magazines, including Rolling Stone, Interview, Flaunt, BlackBook Magazine, Dazed and Confused, Numéro, Harpers Bazaar, Vanity Fair, and the Sports Illustrated Swimsuit Issue. Saint has shot campaigns for brands, including Puma, Nike, Costume National, and Diesel.

In 2018, Saint moved beyond traditional photography and began exploring his work through painting; an inquiry into beauty, identity, celebrity, and the resulting psychological complexities of self-perception in our time. Saint's new creative process, which he calls "Lumadynamic Decomposition", is the result of challenging his own photography.

Saint's new creative process, which he calls "Lumadynamic Decomposition", is the result of challenging his own photography.

=== Award ===
Saint is a recipient of the Hasselblad Masters Award.

== See also ==
- List of mixed-media artists
- List of painters
- List of photographers
- List of South African artists
