= Liesching =

Liesching is a surname. Notable people with the surname include:

- Carla Liesching (born 1985), South African artist
- Percivale Liesching (1895–1973), British civil servant
- Theodor Gottfried Liesching (1865–1922), German jurist and politician
