= Borcherding =

Borcherding is a German language surname. It stems from the male given name Burchard – and may refer to:

- Anthony Borcherding (1974), American professional wrestler
- Horst Borcherding (1930–2015), German footballer
- Kate Borcherding (1960), American artist working in mixed media
- Kurt Borcherding (1967), retired American rower
- Thomas Borcherding (1939–2014), American economist
