= Lonwabo Kilani =

South African multidisciplinary artist (born 1980)

- Born: 1980 (age 45–46); Cape Town, South Africa
- Education: University Of Cape Town
- Known for: Painting, digital animation, Video art
- Movement: Contemporary art

Lonwabo Kilani (1980 – December 2025) was a South African multidisciplinary artist whose practice spanned painting, mixed media, digital animation, installation, and socially engaged art. He is noted for his involvement in the Cape Town–based collective "Gugulective", and his work has been exhibited at institutions including the AVA Gallery and the Iziko South African National Gallery. Kilani's research and creative practice engage with post-apartheid social politics, memory, identity, and community-based artistic production.

== Early life and education ==
Kilani was born in Cape Town in 1980 and started primary school at Lwandle Primary School and did his matric at Bulumko Secondary school, both in Khayelitsha. He completed two years of Visual Arts training at the Community Arts Project (CAP) in 2001 and later undertook further studies in film and animation, digital arts, and interactive media, completing a BA in Motion Picture (Directing Animation) and an Honours degree in Curatorship at the University of Cape Town.

== Career ==
Kilani worked across media, including painting, animation, installation, mixed media, and curatorial practice. His work is characterized by textured earth-based materials, layered imagery, and themes related to South African political history, identity, memory, and social transformation.

Kilani has been associated with the Cape Town–based collective "Gugulective", a group known for its politically engaged public art interventions and township-based creative practice and also served as a board member of the Greatmore Arts Trust.

== Exhibitions ==
=== Solo exhibitions ===
- Rope, Dope & Hope—Association for Visual Arts (AVA) Gallery, Cape Town, 2016. Reviewed in Art Africa.

=== Selected group exhibitions ===
- In Living Colour—Two-person exhibition with Ndikhumbule Ngqinambi, Barnard Gallery, Cape Town.
- Umsi (the smoke)—Group exhibition including Lindile Magunya, Ndikhumbule Ngqinambi, Thulani Shuku, Dathini Mzayiya, Lonwabo Kilani, and Vivien Kohler.
- Gugulective Projects—Various public interventions and collective exhibitions in Cape Town (mid-2000s–present).
- Group exhibitions affiliated with Greatmore Studios, Cape Town.

=== Curatorial work ===
- Still Life and Life Drawings: A Moment Captured or Preserved? – Curator. Iziko South African National Gallery, Cape Town (23 November–7 December 2018).

== Selected works ==
- Written in White (2015)—oil and soil on canvas, 135 × 212 cm. Listed in the Art Bank of South Africa collection.
- Message in a Bottle—mixed media work.

== Auctions ==
- The Soccer Match—sold at Strauss & Co, Cape Town, 2023.
- Collaborative Artwork (Week II) (2004)—sold at Strauss & Co.; Kilani listed as one of the contributing artists.

== Academic work ==
Kilani authored the MAFA thesis Art, Anti-Blackness and the Language of Protest at the University of Cape Town in 2023.

== Themes and style ==
Kilani's work frequently incorporates soil, sand, and raw textured surfaces, blending abstract and figurative elements. His themes include:

- Social and political memory.
- Township life and urban identity
- Post-apartheid trauma and healing
- Collaborative and community-engaged practice
