= Jan Vermeiren =

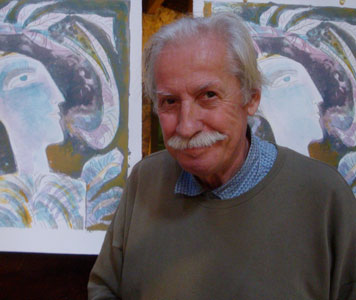
- Jan Vermeiren
- Born: 1949; Bornem Belgium
- Education: Koninklijke Academie voor Schone Kunsten Antwerpen
- Known for: Painting, Drawing, Print making

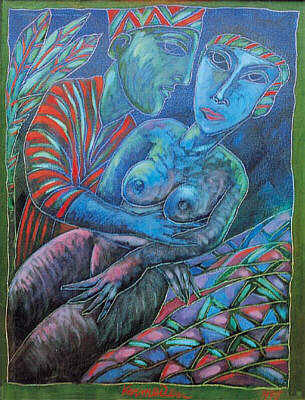
Seduction, oil on canvas

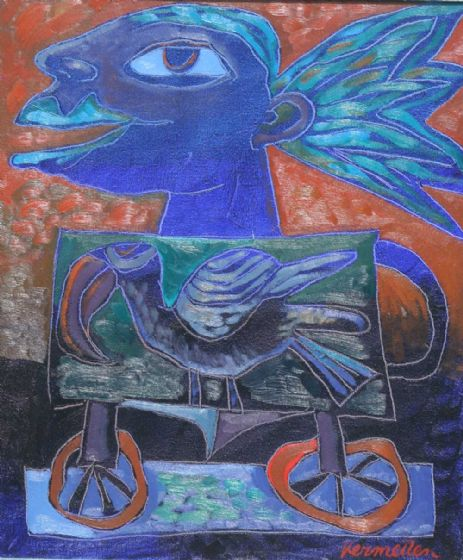
Groot-bek Meisie, oil on canvas

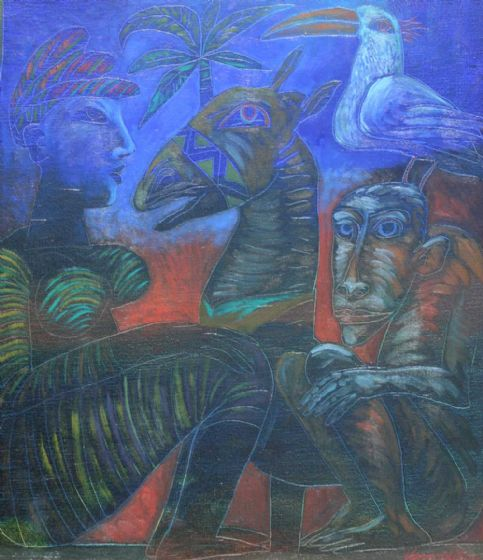
Beauty and the Beast, oil on canvas

Jan Vermeiren (born 1949 in Belgium) lives and works in South Africa as a painter (oil and mural painting) and printmaker (lithography and etching).

He is an artist whose work bridges two rich and vastly different cultures. On the one hand, there is his European heritage, on the other, the profound influence of Africa, which is now his home. This duality brings an exciting and unusual dimension to his work. His images reveal a series of archetypal symbols derived from various ancient cultures, reflecting his belief that it is these 'primitive' symbols that unite man across time and different civilizations. His aim is to bring the viewer into the spirit of Africa, to encourage a better understanding of the African identity.

== Biography ==
Art studies 1968-71 Koninklijke Academie voor Schone Kunsten Antwerpen, Belgium and 1971-74 Koninklijke Academie voor Schone Kunsten Antwerpen, Belgium, where he attained a Degree in Graphic Art. Student of Geert Reusens and the sculptor Lode Eyckermans. He then became a lecturer at the Technical College for Advanced Education in Cape Town (1981–87) where he joined an artist group with Alfred Krentz, Marthinus la Grange, Erik Laubscher, Claude Bouscharain and Stanley Pinker. Since 1977 he has lived permanently in South Africa, now in Cape Town.

Jan Vermeiren was born in Bornem, Belgium in 1949. From a very early age, drawing was an important means of expression for him and he began formal art training while still at school. Later he studied full time at the Academy St. Niklaas and the Academy of Mechelen, and then at the National Hoger Institute in Antwerp. As a student, printmaking was his special interest, and it was only when he moved to South Africa in 1976 that he became a painter. His decision to move came after he had spent a year in the country during 1973/4 when he was invited to teach lithography. He was profoundly influenced by the extensive range of colors which he found here, after the relative greyness of Belgium. These 'African' colors are very evident in his work - both in the early tones, and in the dark, atmospheric backgrounds, which appears in his more recent work.

His work is now considered a vivid element of the post-world-war South African art scene generating a European view to traditional South-African culture. Illustrator of children's books and periodicals. Hallmarks of his career are a consignment for the painting "Gift in Africa" as gift from the Flemish Government to South African President Nelson Mandela (1997), an exhibition of paintings for the Millennium Exhibition in Cape Town (1999) and an exhibition of oil paintings in the South African pavilion at EXPO 2000 in Hannover, Germany (2000).

Jan Vermeiren is profile Member of the SAAA, Cape Town Branch and member of the South African Artists Guild.

Exhibitions: Jan Vermeiren has participated in numerous group exhibitions from 1969 held in Belgium, Yugoslavia, South Africa, the USA, Germany and Namibia. He has had several notable solo exhibitions in Belgium and in South Africa, including:

- 1969 in Dendermonde, Belgium, first of three solo exhibitions held in Belgium and eleven in South Africa.
- 1981 Republic Festival Exhibition : South Africa.
- 1985 Tributaries : South Africa and Germany.
- 2009 Jan Vermeiren, Out of Africa : Provinciebestuur Antwerpen.

Public Commissions:

- 1979 Bacchus mural, De Waal Hotel, Cape Town.
- 1983 Fantasia mural, Drama Theatre, University of the Orange Free State.

Reference AASA.

== Collections ==
Vermeiren's works can be found at the Iziko South African National Gallery, Durban Art Gallery, National Museum, Bloemfontein, Pretoria Art Museum, the University of the Orange Free State, Bibliothèque Nationale de France, Victoria and Albert Museum, Albertina, the Sterckshof Museum, Antwerp, Belgium.
