= Richard Scott (artist) =

South African artist

Richard Scott (born 14 December 1968, Middlesbrough, England) is a British born artist, residing in Cape Town and well known for the phrase Naive meets Pop art to describe his unique take on Art. He is very well known for his art both in South Africa and internationally.

Scott matriculated in 1986 from Norkem Part High School in Kempton Park, Gauteng. Although he attended art classes throughout his high school term, he did not pursue, what would become his profession, until 13 years passed. Only in 2001 did Scott make the decision to become a full-time artist. Before pursuing a career as a full-time artist, Scott worked as a technical illustrator and IT specialist. In 2004 he got involved with Mark Atwood, at the Lithography Artist Press in Mpumalanga, South Africa. In 2008 Scott studied silk screening with Keip Silk Screening in Johannesburg.

The art of Scott is very distinctive as he always uses a thick black line in all of his work. His subject matter ranges from the female figure to cats, cars, lighthouses, and planes. Scott has had numerous "group exhibitions" under the label "Naive meets Pop".

The Media used in Scott's art consists of: Pencil, pastel, watercolour, acrylic, oil, lithography, etching, sculpture, new media, and photography

Scott's work is mostly sold outside South Africa. Art Collectors in Europe own at least 75% of the 4,500 paintings he has produced in the last 25 years.

== Family ==
Scott has two children, Richard and Angelina. Scott's father and mother, Len and Janet Scott, immigrated to South Africa in 1969, when Scott was 9 months old. Scott's parents then immigrated back to England in 2004 to retire. Scott has one living sister Angela, who resides in England, and one deceased sister, Susan, who died in 2010 as a result of granulomatosis with polyangiitis.

== Childhood ==
Scott was born at 5 Linton Road Normanby, Redcar and Cleveland, near Middlesbrough. The house is still standing today and is owned by the people who bought it from his parents in 1969. Scott was born at 10pm and weighed 4 kg. Within the first week of arriving in South Africa, Scott fell off the bed in the hotel where his parents were staying and had to have two stitches in his upper lip, which the doctor did without any anesthetic, hence the scar on his lip. Scott was then diagnosed with gluten intolerance and was put on a gluten free diet for two years. In 1971, Scottcontracted chickenpox, with no side effect. In 1976, Scott contracted mumps, also, with no side effects.

== Schooling ==
Scott started schooling in Benoni, Gauteng at Pinegrove Primary School, Springs, Gauteng. Scott was a loner, and thus received good grades throughout School. At the age of 12 Scott's parents moved back to Darlington, England briefly for 18 months. Upon their return to South Africa in 1981, Scott entered into Birch Acres Primary School, in Kempton Park, Gauteng to complete his final year at primary school.

In 1982 Scott entered High School at Norkem Park High, where he completed his schooling in 1986. In 1984 Scott had the choice of subjects and choose French over art. He soon realised his friends all took art and so he switched. Scott recalls art been a bore under the tuition of Mrs. Moolman. But it was in his final year, under the tuition of Mr. Fuel, that Scott really flourished in art. It was Mr. Fuel's teaching style that allowed Scott to express himself.

== Exhibitions ==
2002

- January – Hout Bay Gallery, Group Exhibition
- March – Bellville Association of Visual Arts
- April – Bay Art Gallery, Kalk Bay, Group Exhibition
- May – Knysna Fine Art Gallery, The Art of Colour Exhibition with Vgallery
- June – Art Channel Diversity 4 Exhibition
- June – Ekurhuleni Fine Arts Finalist Exhibition

2003

- March – Lennox Gallery, Exhibition with Vanessa Berlein, London
- June – AVA Gallery Cape Town, Members Exhibition
- July – Hout Bay Gallery, Group Exhibition
- August – Grosvenorvilla Art Gallery, Cape Town, Group Exhibition
- September – VEO Gallery, Cape Town, Art De Waterkant Group Exhibition
- October – Brett Keble Awards (Inaugural), Cape Town, Finalist Exhibition
- December – VEO Gallery, Cape Town, Exhibition with Chris Basson
- December – VEO Gallery, Cape Town, Art of the Motorcycle – Harley-Davidson Centenary

2004

- January – Sue Lipschitz Gallery, Plettenberg Bay, Group Exhibition
- January – Rossouw Gallery Cape Town, White is a Colour Group Exhibition
- September – Solo at Winchester Mansions, Cape Town
- October – Brett Keble Awards 2004 Cape Town, Finalist Exhibition
- November – AVA Absolut Vodka 9 group exhibition
- November – Group exhibition at Muiz Studio, Muizenberg
- December – Group exhibition at MOJA MODERN, Johannesburg
- December – VEO Gallery, Cape Town, Solo, Pop Goes The Easel

2005

- April – Rossouw Gallery Cape Town, Solo, Light Years Away
- May – Woolworths in store, Group exhibition
- September – Moving Gallery, Antwerp, Belgium, Group Exhibition
- November – AVA Absolut Secret 10 – Absolut Finale
- December – VEO Gallery, Cape Town, Wavesacpes, Group Exhibition
- December – KIZO Art Gallery, Kwazulu Natal, Durban, Solo
- December – VEO Gallery, Cape Town, Richard Scott invites Gavin Rain to exhibit with him
- December – 34LONG, Cape Town, group exhibition, East West

2006

- January – Worldart, Hamilton Russell, Hermanus, Solo
- February – Rossouw Gallery, Cape Town, An Evening of Erotica, Group Exhibition
- April – Hout Bay Gallery, Solo
- March – 34LONG, Cape Town, group exhibition, Metal
- July – CTICC, Solo, Supermodel 2006
- August – KIZO Art Gallery, Aston Martin Exhibitionroom, Sandton, Group Exhibition
- August – KIZO Art Gallery, Decorex, Johannesburg, Group Exhibition
- October – Moving Gallery, Leuven, Belgium, Speechless, Group Exhibition
- December – KIZO Art Gallery, Kwazulu Natal, Durban, Group Exhibition
- December – VEO Gallery, Cape Town, Wavesacpes, Group Exhibition

2007

- January – Worldart, Cape Town, Solo
- February – Kizo Art Gallery, Durban, Homemakers, Group Exhibition
- February – VEO Gallery, Cape Town, Wavesacpes, Group Exhibition
- March – Marlies Dekkers, Amsterdam, Open Closed
- April – Worldart, Johannesburg, Solo
- April – Kizo Art Gallery, Decorex, Cape Town, Group Exhibition
- April – Cape Town School of Photography, Group Exhibition
- May – Winchester Mansions, Cape Town, Solo
- May – Rust-en-Vrede, Durbanville, Solo
- June – Worldart, Cape Town, Beauty and the Beasts, solo
- August – Kizo Art Gallery, Decorex JHB Galagher, AffordArt
- August – Kizo Art Gallery, Cape Town, Homemakers, Group Exhibition
- August – Kizo Art Gallery, Durban, Homemakers, Group Exhibition
- September – Paarl, Cultivaria, Die voël met die af vlerk, Group Exhibition
- September – Kizo, Durban The Heritage Exhibition, Group Exhibition
- October – Kizo Art Gallery, Heritage, Group Exhibition
- October – Kizo Art Gallery, Glamour Aid, Group Exhibition
- November – Hawaan Evening, Durban, Group Exhibition
- November – Kizo Art Gallery, Durban, Umdwebo Festival, Group Exhibition

2008

- January – Worldart, Cape Town, Solo
- January – Kizo Art Gallery, Durban, Oubaai, Group Exhibition
- February – VEO Gallery, Cape Town, Wavescapes, Group Exhibition
- February – Sexpo, Durban, Group Exhibition
- March – Demelza Prettejohn, England, Affordable Art Fair, London
- March – Worldart, Cape Town, Solo, Hypnotized
- March – Peacock Gallery, Franschhoek, Solo Cottage Fromage
- April – Kizo, Durban, Erotica, Group Exhibition
- May – Demelza Prettejohn, England, Bristol Art Fair, Bristol
- May – Kizo, Durban, Ready Made, Group Exhibition
- July – Stephen Falcke, Decorex, Johannesburg
- August – Watercomfort, Johannesburg, Solo
- September – Kizo, Durban, The Heritage Exhibition, Group Exhibition
- October – Demelza Prettejohn, England, Manchester Art Fair, Manchester
- November – Watercomfort, Johannesburg, Solo, VISI magazine
- November – Die Meul, Philadelphia, Cape Town, One day only art splash, Group Exhibition

2009

- February – Luca Carniato, Treviso, Italy, The South African Wave, Solo Exhibition
- February – Lisa King, Cape Town, Group Exhibition
- March – Peacock Gallery, Franschhoek, Solo Cottage Fromage, Solo Exhibition
- March – Luca Carniato, Treviso, Italy, Gas Clothing Store Instore, Group Exhibition
- March – Carniato, Treviso, Italy, Piola Instore, Solo Exhibition
- March – Demelza Prettejohn, England, Affordable Art Fair, London
- April – Imbizo Gallery, Balito, Landscapes and Trees, Group Exhibition
- April – Lisa King, Cape Town, Art on the Piazza, Group Exhibition
- May – Sexpo, Cape Town International Convention Centre, Solo Exhibition
- May – Imbizo Gallery, Balito, Heritage Art Exhibition, Group Exhibition
- June – The Ars Italica Gallery, Milan, The South African Wave Exhibition, Group Exhibition
- June – POP Chicago Gallery, Chicago, America, Group Exhibition
- September – Walker Bay, Hermanus, Spring Exhibition, Group Exhibition
- November – Lisa King, Cape Town, Group Exhibition

2010

- March – Imbizo Gallery, Balito, Shapes and Scapes, Group Exhibition
- March – Demelza Prettejohn, England, Affordable Art Fair, London
- March – Miart, Luca Carniato, Milan, Italy, Group Exhibition
- December – Felix Pakhuis, Antwerp, Belgium, Solo Exhibition

2011

- January – La Modella Nel Ritratto Contemporaneo, Italy, Group Show
- March – Demelza Prettejohn, England, Affordable Art Fair, London

2017

- June - Walker Bay Modern, Hermanus, South Africa, Group Exhibition
- November - ART-Gallery.be, Knokke, Belgium

2018

- January - Popup, Bagshot, Surrey, England, Solo Exhibition
- April - Popup, Butzbach, Germany, Solo Exhibition
- April - Joyride, Step Brothers, Cape Town, South Africa Solo Exhibition
- June - Popup, Frankfurt, Germany, Solo Exhibition
- June - Fynart, Walker Bay Modern, Hermanus, South Africa, Group Exhibition
- July - Trees, Klein Constantia Wine Farm, Cape Town, South Africa, Solo Exhibition

2019

- August to October - Desmond Tutu, Artscape, Cape Town, South Africa, Solo Exhibition
- December - Graffiti Girls, Art it is, Woodstock, Cape Town, South Africa, Solo Exhibition
- December - Graffiti Girls, Busicuit Mill, Woodstock, Cape Town, South Africa, Solo Exhibition
- November – ART-Gallery.be, Knokke, Belgium

== See also ==
- List of South African artists
