= Ndikhumbule Ngqinambi =

South African visual artist

- Born: 1977 (age 48–49); Cape Town, South Africa
- Education: AFDA – The School for the Creative Economy
- Known for: Painting, Visual arts, Video art
- Movement: Contemporary art

Ndikhumbule Ngqinambi (born 1977) is a South African visual artist known for his figurative paintings and multimedia works that explore identity, politics, memory, and performance. His art often merges theatrical and cinematic influences, reflecting both South African and global socio-political narratives.

== Early life and education ==
Ngqinambi was born in 1977 in Cape Town, South Africa. He studied animation and directing at AFDA, The School for the Creative Economy, where he developed an interest in storytelling, film, and performance that later influenced his visual art practice.

== Career ==
Ngqinambi’s work spans painting, video art, and installation. His practice frequently engages with history, movement, and transformation, exploring the relationship between individual experience and collective memory.

=== Style and themes ===
His paintings are characterized by dynamic human figures, symbolic gestures, and layered narratives. Critics have described his work as cinematic and introspective, using visual allegory to comment on displacement, identity, and political change.

=== Exhibitions ===
Ngqinambi has exhibited in South Africa and abroad. His selected exhibitions include:

- In Living Colour, Barnard Gallery, Cape Town (2012)
- 20th Anniversary of the Thami Mnyele Foundation, Amsterdam, Netherlands (2011)
- The Window Part One, Association for Visual Arts, Cape Town (2010)
- Ndikhumbule Ngqinambi: True Colours, Barnard, Cape Town, South Africa, 2014 Group Exhibitions
- Sunny Side Up, Group Exhibition, Graham Contemporary, Johannesburg, South Africa, 2023
- Still here Tomorrow to High Five You Yesterday, Zeitz Museum of Contemporary Art, Cape Town, South Africa, 2019
- Barnard Collective, Barnard, Cape Town, South Africa 2018
- At Night We Dream During the Day We See, Association for Visual Arts Gallery, Cape Town, South Africa. 2011

His work Radiowaves (2016), an oil on canvas, is part of the Zeitz MOCAA collection in Cape Town.

=== Residencies and fellowships ===
Ngqinambi has been an artist-in-residence at several international institutions, including Akademie Schloss Solitude in Stuttgart, Germany in 2013), Dakar Biennale in Senegal in 2010 and the SACATAR Foundation, in Brazil. He was also in residency at the Tulipamwe International Artists Workshop, in Namibia and the Bag Factory Artists Studios, in Johannesburg

=== Collections and recognition ===
His work is held in numerous public and private collections, including Iziko South African National Gallery, University of South Africa, University of Cape Town, Sanlam Private Wealth, and Telkom.

Selected auctioned works include:

- True Colours (2013)—oil on canvas, sold at Strauss & Co, 2020.
- Truth (2014)—sold at Strauss & Co, 2021.
- Amsterdam (2012)—sold at Strauss & Co, 2022.

== Themes and impact ==
Ngqinambi’s art often addresses human movement—both physical and metaphorical—exploring migration, exile, and transformation. His imagery captures emotional tension, with figures placed between stillness and motion, dream and memory. He has been recognized as part of the generation of South African artists bridging fine art, film, and performance, contributing to broader conversations on post-apartheid identity and global belonging.

== Workshops and teaching ==
Beyond his studio practice, Ngqinambi has facilitated workshops and cultural exchanges at institutions in Cape Town, Johannesburg, Stuttgart, São Paulo, Wales, and Florence.

== See also ==
- Zeitz Museum of Contemporary Art Africa
- List of South African artists
