= Michael Woods II =

American football player (born 2000)

Profile
- Position: Wide receiver

Personal information
- Born: March 19, 2000 (age 26); Magnolia, Texas, U.S.
- Listed height: 6 ft 1 in (1.85 m)
- Listed weight: 204 lb (93 kg)

Career information
- High school: Magnolia
- College: Arkansas (2018–2020); Oklahoma (2021)
- NFL draft: 2022: 6th round, 202nd overall pick

Career history
- Cleveland Browns (2022–2024); Green Bay Packers (2025)*; Denver Broncos (2026)*
- * Offseason or practice squad member only

Career NFL statistics as of 2025
- Receptions: 12
- Receiving yards: 110
- Stats at Pro Football Reference

Michael Woods II (born March 19, 2000) is an American professional football wide receiver. He played college football for the Arkansas Razorbacks and Oklahoma Sooners. Woods was selected by the Cleveland Browns in the sixth round of the 2022 NFL draft. He has also been a member of the Green Bay Packers and Denver Broncos.

== Early life ==
Woods grew up in Magnolia, Texas and attended Magnolia High School. He caught 155 passes for 2,988 yards and 41 touchdowns in three varsity seasons at Magnolia. Woods was rated a three-star recruit and initially committed to play college football at SMU. He later decommitted and signed to play at Arkansas after SMU coach Chad Morris was hired by the school.

== College career ==
Woods began his college career at Arkansas. He started seven games had 18 receptions for 206 yards and one touchdown as a freshman. Woods gained 423 receiving yards while leading the team with 33 catches and four touchdown receptions in his sophomore season. As a junior, he caught 32 passes for 619 yards and five touchdowns. Woods entered the NCAA transfer portal in April during his junior year.

Woods ultimately transferred to Oklahoma. He played in 11 games during the 2021 season and caught 35 passes for 400 yards and two touchdowns. Following the end of the season Woods declared that he would be entering the 2022 NFL draft.

== Professional career ==
Pre-draft measurables
Height	Weight	Arm length	Hand span	40-yard dash	10-yard split	20-yard split	20-yard shuttle	Three-cone drill	Vertical jump	Broad jump
6 ft 1 1/8 in (1.86 m)	204 lb (93 kg)	33 in (0.84 m)	9 5/8 in (0.24 m)	4.37 s	1.51 s	2.57 s	4.46 s	7.07 s	35.5 in (0.90 m)	10 ft 5 in (3.18 m)

=== Cleveland Browns ===
Woods was selected in the sixth round with the 202nd overall pick in the 2022 NFL Draft by the Cleveland Browns. In his rookie season, he caught five passes for 45 yards while also appearing on special teams.

On April 4, 2023, Woods suffered a ruptured Achilles during an independent workout with Deshaun Watson. He was placed on the reserve/non-football injury list. On December 1, 2023, Woods was suspended for six games for violating the league's personal conduct policy.

On August 27, 2024, Woods was waived by the Browns and re-signed to the practice squad. On December 7, he was promoted to the active roster.

On July 30, 2025, Woods was waived by the Browns with an injury designation.

=== Green Bay Packers ===
On November 4, 2025, Woods signed with the Green Bay Packers' practice squad. He was released by the Packers on December 2.

=== Denver Broncos ===
On May 11, 2026, Woods signed with the Denver Broncos after trying out at their rookie minicamp. On June 16, Woods was designated as waived/injured after suffering an injury during OTAs. After clearing waivers, he reverted to injured reserve. On June 24, Woods was waived from injured reserve with an injury settlement.

== Personal life ==
Woods is the nephew of Dianne Durham, the first Black gymnast to win the USA All-around championship in 1983.
