= Gavin Rain =

South African artist

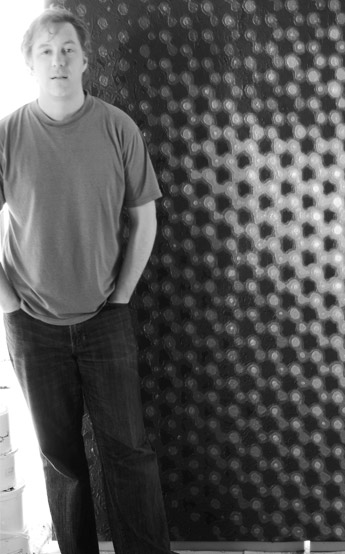
- Gavin Rain in 2008
- Born: 23 March 1971 (age 55); Cape Town, South Africa
- Education: University of Cape Town
- Occupation: artist
- Known for: acrylic Neo-Pointillist style

Gavin Rain (born 23 March 1971) is a contemporary South African artist, working primarily in acrylic, best known for his Neo-Pointillist style paintings.

== Life and work ==
Gavin Rain was born in Cape Town, South Africa. He studied art formally at the University of Cape Town, under artists such as Hannah Adams and South African art historian Dr. Jacqueline Nolte (although majoring in neuropsychology) and at Ruth Prowse Art School, in Woodstock, Cape Town. Having painted from a young age, Rain only arrived at his neo-pointillist style in 2004, taking roughly two years to formulate the style. In various interviews, Rain cites two main narratives in his work:

- Hidden in plain sight - The main purpose for Rain developing a new style was to force viewers to acknowledge that part of the narrative of each painting is 'hidden in plain sight', whereby it is impossible to see the subject of the painting until the viewer takes a few steps back (see images below):
Hidden in plain sight

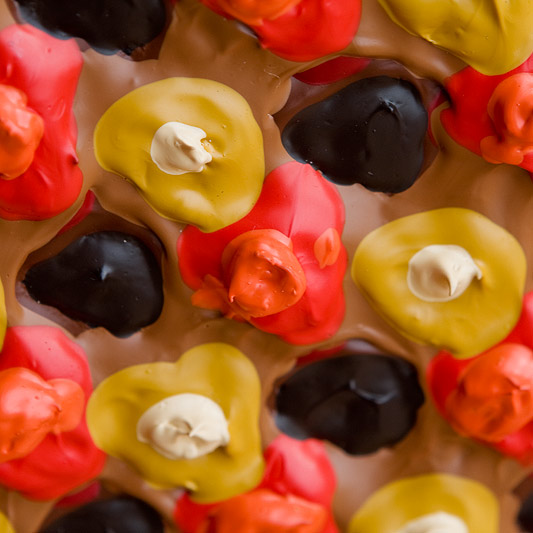
A closeup view of the painting The soft dream (2008), showing individual dots of paint

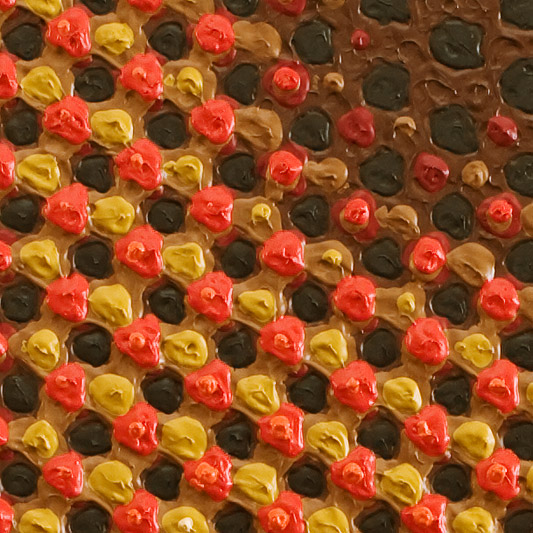
A view of the same painting from a distance

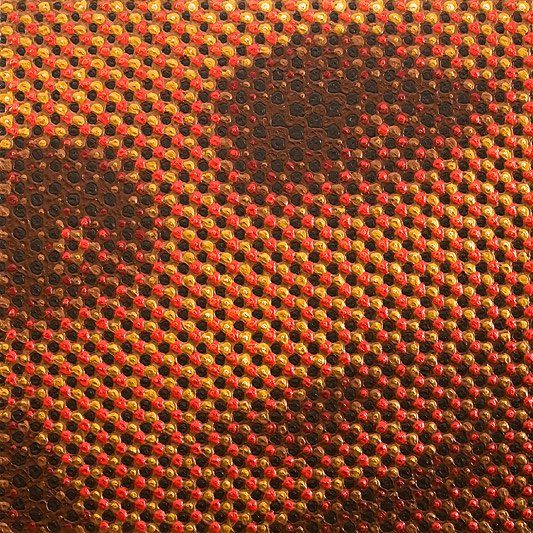
Full view of the painting showing the resolve
- Pseudo digital - The vast majority of Rain's neo-pointillist works are depicted using rows of dots in a pattern similar to that of a television or computer screen (see above images), emulating a digital image. The emphasis of the narrative in the work is on the gaps between the dots as a way of highlighting the lack of information presented by a digital image's necessarily distinct intervals of tone/colour.

In addition to exhibitions, Rain's work is available in galleries in Cape Town, Durban, Johannesburg, Milan and Venice. In 2009 Rain was chosen by the 2010 Fine Art Group (licensed under FIFA) to complete 12 portraits for the 2010 FIFA World Cup, taking place in South Africa, alongside artists such as Esther Mahlangu and Keith Calder.

== 54th Venice Biennale ==
Rain was invited to participate in the 54th Venice Biennale of 2011 by Fabio Anselmi, co-curator of the Costa Rica pavilion. For the occasion, Rain completed a 2m x 2m neo-pointillist piece of Aung San Suu Kyi, the Burmese opposition politician. Each point or dot of the work represented a country. Rain was picked for the Costa Rican pavilion before the selection of the South African pavilion (entering for the first time) was announced, amidst some controversy as to the choice of curator.

== Selected exhibitions ==
- 2005, 2006 Solo exhibition: Veo Gallery, de Waterkant, Cape Town
- 2007 Solo exhibition: Worldart Gallery, Johannesburg
- 2008 Solo exhibition: Kizo Gallery, Heritage festival, Kwazulu-Natal
- 2009 African Wave exhibitions: Treviso, Trieste, Venice and Milan
- 2010 Miart Art Now, Milan
- 2011 Art Chicago, Art Accessibile Milan, 54th Venice Biennale
- 2013 55th Venice Biennale - Bangladesh Pavilion "Supernatural"
- 2013 Solo exhibition: "Supernatural part 1" Bugno Art Gallery, Venice (IT)

== See also ==
- List of South African artists
- Venice Biennale
