= Adriaan Diedericks =

Artist (b. 1990)

Adriaan Hermanus Diedericks (born 1 November 1990, Cape Town, South Africa) is a South African artist. He is known for his contemporary bronze sculptures.

== Career ==
After graduating with a fine arts degree from Stellenbosch University in 2012, he apprenticed with Lionel Smit from 2013 to 2014. Diedericks was a SASOL New Signatures Finalist in 2010 and 2014 and a PPC YCSA Finalist in 2013. In 2014, Diedericks was invited to take part in Art Fair Strasbourg and Cologne.

He has appeared in Top Billing, Effe O' Arte, Visi, Country Life, Ubi Bene and SLOW Magazine. Diedericks opened a bronze casting foundry in 2016 in Strand, South Africa. In 2017, Diedericks attended the 4th International Artist Symposium along with 9 other artists from around the world at Museum Villa Böhm in Germany where he worked with sandstone for the first time. Diedericks placed large public sculptures in Stellenbosch, Hermanus, Franschhoek and Rhineland-Palatinate, Germany.

== Style ==
Diedericks' work has been compared to ancient Greek sculptures. It also references on Classical, African and European mythology with imagery of men, horses and ships. Many of his works are inspired by Michel Foucault's Theory of Power and the dialectic of Hegel's master and servant.
