= Nerine Desmond =

South African artist

Nerine Constantia Desmond
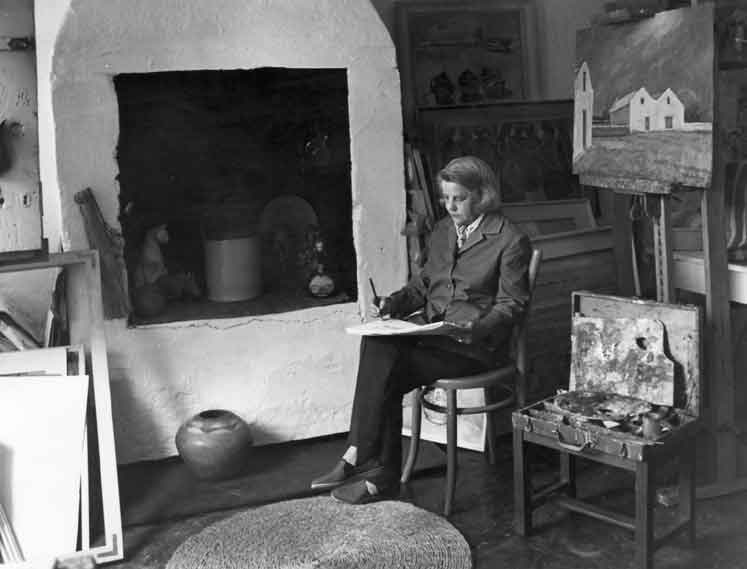
- 1968
- Born: Nerine Constantia Desmond-Smith; 18 July 1908; Constantia, Cape Town, South Africa
- Died: 8 May 1993 (aged 84); Stellenbosch, Western Cape, South Africa
- Resting place: Onderpapegaaiberg Cemetery, Stellenbosch
- Education: Central School of Art and Design (Note: Offered a scholarship to Michaelis School of Art, but forced to decline by her mother; 'As she [ND] needed to go out and earn her living', and 'had apprenticed her to a signwriter'. It was a blow too bitter for tears'. [ABWL]); Pretoria Girls High School; Star of the Sea Convent, St James, Cape Town
- Known for: Watercolour, oil painting
- Notable work: 'The Cavalcade' (Note: A print of this large oil was produced by E. Schweickert of Pretoria circa 1960, and included in UNESCO's 'Illustrated Catalogue of Selected Prints in 1960')
- Movement: New Group (South Africa)
- Spouse: Dawid Botha (1945–46)
- Patrons: William Fehr; Sir Herbert Stanley; Charles Te Water; Alers Hankey[et al]

Nerine Desmond (18 July 1908 – 8 May 1993) (Note: Her memoirs A Brush with Life) was a South African artist known particularly for her watercolour and oil paintings, especially landscapes, seascapes, portraits, Basuto horsemen, and pastoral scenes showing cattle herders and goat herders with their animals.

== Biography ==
Desmond was born in Constantia, Cape Town, on 18 July 1908, the daughter of Nicolaas Johannes Smith, an Afrikaner clergyman, and Ivy Desmond. She studied at London's Central School of Art in 1938, where she learned graphic-printing techniques; but was otherwise largely self-taught. Desmond was politically conservative, and once refused the use of one of her works on the cover of a novel by Nadine Gordimer, stating in justification that Gordimer was "not a loyal South African".

== Career ==
Desmond exhibited in South Africa from 1935 until her death, initially both as a member of the South African Society of Artists and the rival New Group. She was influenced by a number of artists active at the time, including Gregoire Boonzaier and Frieda Lock, becoming well known for her portrait painting and farm-related and rural subjects. Initially she worked from a studio in Loop Street, Cape Town. Later she painted at her homes in Hout Bay, Wynberg, Jonkershoek, and her last home in Onderpapegaaiberg, Stellenbosch.

. In 1948 she painted extensively in South West Africa (now Namibia); and in 1953 similarly in Zanzibar and Mombasa, Kenya.

A South African 1961 one-cent postage stamp carried a design by Desmond and in the same year she was elected as Fellow of the International Institute of Arts and Letters. She exhibited in all three Quadrennials of South African Art between 1956 and 1964, as well as at the São Paulo Biennale (graphic), Brazil in 1961.

She exhibited with the Women's International Art Club and the Royal Institute of Painters, and held solo shows in Johannesburg in 1962 and Pretoria in 1970. Her works are held in the following collections: Bloemfontein: Oliewenhuis Art Gallery; Iziko South African Museum; Durban Art Gallery; East London: Ann Bryant Art Gallery; Graaff-Reinet: Hester Rupert Art Museum; Johannesburg Art Gallery; Kimberley: William Humphreys Art Gallery; Pietermaritzburg: Tatham Art Gallery; Port Elizabeth: Nelson Mandela Art Museum; Pretoria Art Museum; SABC art collection. In addition, her works were acquired by HM Queen Elizabeth The Queen Mother; William Ormsby-Gore, 4th Baron Harlech; and Alfred Beit et al.

== Bibliography ==
1. Roberts, Ronald Suresh (2005). No Cold Kitchen: A Biography of Nadine Gordimer. STE Publishers. ISBN 978-1919855585.
