= Isabelle Brourman =

American artist

- Born: 1992 or 1993 (age 32–33)
- Occupation: Mixed media artist
- Known for: Courtroom sketches

Isabelle Brourman (born 1992 or 1993) is an American mixed media artist, known for her bold style of courtroom sketches of high-profile defendants including Donald Trump and Johnny Depp. During the 2024 presidential campaign, and after the attempted assassination of Trump in Butler, Pennsylvania, Brourman arranged two sittings with the candidate at Mar-a-Lago in which she observed his ear and painted his portrait. The first sitting was conducted during an interview of Trump by former New York magazine Washington correspondent Olivia Nuzzi.

As of August 2025, Brourman is covering the Trump administration's immigration crackdown, a project which she views as an ongoing portrait of President Trump. Her documentation in New York City's immigration courts serves as the first and only artistic account to emerge from the waiting rooms and courtrooms of 26 Federal Plaza.

In 2021, Brourman alleged that while she was an undergraduate at the University of Michigan, a professor pressured her into a series of sexual encounters, and later, after she had graduated, raped her.
