= JG Mair =

- Born: Jeff Gordon Mair; Cranbrook, British Columbia, Canada
- Notable work: Urbatory, site[d], Utopian Dystopia

Jeff Gordon (JG) Mair is a Canadian new-media virtual artist and mixed-media visual artist who combines elements of painting, installation and the web in his work. Mair currently lives and works in Vancouver, British Columbia.

== Career ==
JG Mair studied Fine Art at the University of Victoria and Art Education at the University of British Columbia.

Mair's work combines digital and traditional media to pursue themes of control, data and resources and prompts viewers to reflect on the information-based society in which they are immersed. JG Mair has exhibited in Canada, U.S.A. and Japan.

Ars Scientia

In 2023 Mair was an invited artist in residence at University of British Columbia's Ars Scientia program, a tripartite partnership fusing arts and science in the emergent fields of interdisciplinary research between UBC’s Stewart Blusson Quantum Matter Institute (Blusson QMI), the Department of Physics and Astronomy and The Morris and Helen Belkin Art Gallery. As part of his residency Mair collaborated with SBQMI Condensed Matter Physicist Alannah Hallas by mixing paint medium with quantum materials in order to produce paintings.

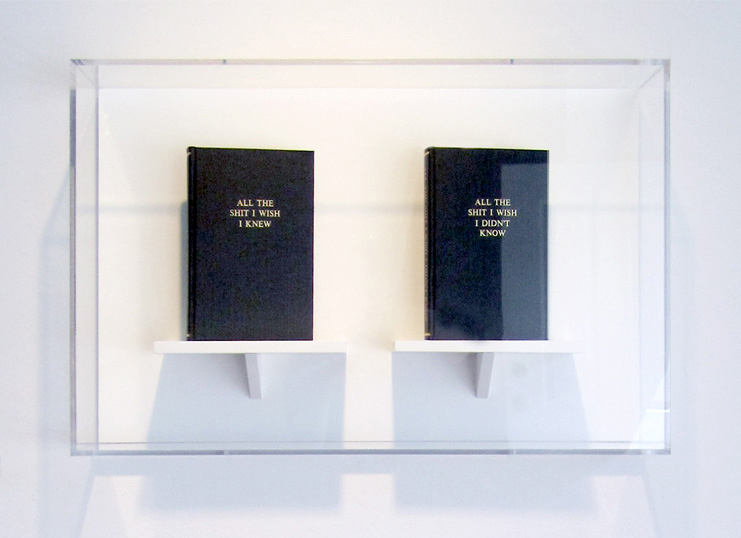
JG Mair - Tomes (from Thought Control)

== Works ==
- urbatory
- pairograms
- release/aftershock
- thought control
- site[d]
- Utopian Dystopia
