= Cyril Fradan =

South African artist and designer (1928–1997)

Cyril Fradan (1928–1997) was a South African artist and designer who worked almost exclusively in acrylic paints incorporating various glazing techniques.

== Life and work ==
One of South Africa's foremost painters, Cyril Fradan was born in Johannesburg in 1928. He was educated, and later lectured at the University of the Witwatersrand and held his first one-man show in Johannesburg in 1954. Relocating to London in 1960, Fradan exhibited successfully in most British and European art centres.

Fradan worked almost exclusively in acrylic paints and made extensive use of glazing techniques. Furthermore, he was a successful and skilled exponent of the Baroque style used in contemporary, non-figurative terms. What this means is that Fradan blends illusion, light and colour, and a sense of passionate movement, all calculated to overwhelm the viewer by a direct emotional appeal. His use of such effects as the dissolved contour, the rendering of movement through flickering light, allied with his use of glowing colour, brought into being a style that had a profound effect on the South African audiences who saw it.

Fradan rarely titled his paintings, believing that the images evoked in the spectator by the swirling, energetic forms in his canvases were, in fact, the correct ones.

"Each viewer will see in my paintings what he wants to - I don't believe that the artist should interpose with titles, which are often misleading anyway."

As well as painting, Fradan provided costume designs for dramatic productions including the 1955 Margaret Inglis production of Shakespeare's Hamlet. Additionally, he provided costume designs for the 1966 Gordon Crosse production of W. B. Yeats's Purgatory.

Fradan was a much-loved and well-respected member of the London arts scene. His annual summer music festivals held at his house at 23 Lower Addison Gardens, were a joy to music lovers and provided an opportunity to view his work. In his later years Fradan eschewed the art gallery scene, preferring his festival-based approach to sales of his increasingly popular paintings. He developed personal relationships with many of his patrons, who met regularly at his home; particularly during the festivals.

Cyril Fradan left for Thailand in 1986, where he died in 1997 after successive operations to remove brain tumours.

== Exhibitions ==
Cyril Fradan exhibited extensively - including at the Royal Academy, London in 1963. His work is represented in the following public collections:

- South African National Gallery, Cape Town
- Oliewenhuis Art Museum, Bloemfontein
- Nelson Mandela Metropolitan Art Museum (King George VI Art Gallery), Port Elizabeth
- Pretoria Art Museum, Pretoria
- Pietersburg Art Museum, Polokwane
- UNISA, Pretoria

=== Solo exhibitions ===
- 1961: Woodstock Gallery, London
- 1962: Galerie d'Eendt, Amsterdam; Galerie Kobenhaven, Copenhagen; Mercury Gallery, London; Tib Lane Gallery, Manchester
- 1964: Mercury Gallery, London
- 1968: Galerie Werkstatt, im Schnoor, Bremen, Germany
- 1965: Tib Lane Gallery, Manchester; Galerie Sothmann, Amsterdam; Ash Barn Gallery, Petersfield
- 1966: Mercury Gallery, London; Tib Lane Gallery, Manchester
- 1967: Plymouth Art Centre, Plymouth
- 1968: Gallery 101, Johannesburg; Wolpe Gallery, Cape Town; Galerie Sothmann, Amsterdam; Galerie Werkstatt, Bremen
- 1969: Tib Lane Gallery, Manchester; York Festival, York; Galerie du Theatre, Geneva
- 1970: Lidchi Gallery Gallery, Johannesburg; Kapian Gallery, Cape Town
- 1971: Galerie Balans, Amsterdam
- 1973: Arts Council Gallery, Belfast; Midland Group Gallery, Nottingham
- 1974: Ansdell Gallery, London
- 1975: Galerie du Theatre, Geneva
- 1976: Goodman Gallery, Johannesburg; Goodman-Wolman Gallery, Cape Town; Pretoria Art Museum, Pretoria
- 1977: S.A. Association of Arts, Pretoria; Neil Sack Gallery, Durban
- 1979: and thereafter annual exhibitions and music recitals at his Studio in Holland Park, London
- 1983: Gallery 21, Johannesburg
