= Hermann Niebuhr =

South African artist (born 1972)

Hermann Niebuhr is a South African artist who lives in De Rust. He utilizes oils on canvas in a classical painterly style to document urban decay as well as rural landscapes.

Homage, a Johannesburg cityscape by Herman Niebuhr

Niebuhr was born in Johannesburg in 1972. He studied at Rhodes University, Grahamstown and graduated with a Bachelor of Fine Arts (with distinction in History of Art) in 1993.

He spent six years in the arid region of South Africa known as the Karoo. Working from the small town of De Rust, Niebuhr isolated himself and developed his technique. Upon his return to his hometown of Johannesburg in 2002, he began to confront the challenges of living and making art in one of Africa's largest and politically most complex cities.

In Night Ride Home (2005), Niebuhr told the story of a young man from the northern suburbs driving past blurring lights on his way to a safe haven.

Niebuhr's exhibition Night Shift (2008) brought him to the heart of the city. Armed with only a camera, he entered neighborhoods such as Hillbrow which had most dramatically shifted from Art Deco affluence in the mid-to-late 20th century to poverty and crime in the early 21st. Niebuhr photographed the foyers of the lovely old buildings and then painted them in oils, taking the perspective of the (somewhat symbolic) security guards protecting the edifices and their residents. These accurate and objective paintings, unpeopled but resonant with history, create a sense of melancholy around the city's decline.

Niebuhr delved into Johannesburg's history as a gold-mining boomtown for mine, a show un-ironically exhibited at the AshantiGold Gold of Africa Museum, sponsored by Africa's largest mining company. For this series of monochromatic paintings, Niebuhr sourced photos of the mine dumps surrounding Johannesburg—piles of gold dust and mining dregs which are as large as man-made pyramids and dominate the landscapes of Johannesburg's outlying areas.

White Painting, a solo exhibition at the historic Casa Labia in Muizenberg, Cape Town, offered round canvases as portholes into Johannesburg, as though Capetonians could see their faraway sister city only through the long end of a telescope. These paintings, too, were mostly black and white.

2012 brought Niebuhr his first solo show at the Everard Read Gallery Johannesburg. In City Chromatic Niebuhr's mastery of his subject matter, the Johannesburg cityscape, allowed him to experiment with new painterly techniques. In doing so, his previously monochromatic work gained new washes of ecstatic color as well as portions of paintings dripping and dissolving—representing both Johannesburg's explosions of innovation as well as its flux and disorder.

Niebuhr's 2013 exhibition, "Stillness," documented his journeys by bicycle through the Swartberg Mountains and Die Hel in South Africa and the Himalayas in India. Since "cycling is the new horseback," as he told an interviewer, it sets the perfect pace for a landscape painter. The series is called "Stillness" because of the internal space that opens up inside of the viewer while regarding the open landscapes.

Niebuhr currently divides his time between his studios in Fordsburg, Johannesburg, and De Rust in the Klein Karoo.

SELECTED EXHIBITIONS

2013
Stillness, THE CANOPY GALLERY, Johannesburg
Weather Report, ARTKLOP, Potchefstroom

2012
City Chromatic, EVERARD READ, Johannesburg
Mine, PART - Prince Albert Art Festival, Prince Albert
Young Masters, JUPITER ART ROOM, Pretoria

2011
Horse, EVERARD READ, Johannesburg

2010
Decade, CAROL LEE FINE ART, Johannesburg
White Painting, CASA LABIA, Cape Town
Due South, EVERARD READ GALLERY, Cape Town

2009
Mine, ASHANTIGOLD GOLD OF AFRICA MUSEUM, Johannesburg
Bram Fischer Memorial, BRAMFISCHERVILLE COMMUNITY HALL/JOHANNESBURG DEVELOPMENT AGENCY, Johannesburg
The Great South African Nude, EVERARD READ GALLERY, Johannesburg
Champagne for my Facebook Friends, THE CANOPY GALLERY, Johannesburg

2008
South Africa Abroad, HODNETT FINE ART STUDIO GALLERY, Vancouver
Night Shift, THE CANOPY GALLERY, Johannesburg

2007
Antarctica - On Thin Ice, UNITED NATIONS GALLERY, New York City

2006
A Month of Sundays, GALLERY ON THE SQUARE, Johannesburg

2005
Night Ride Home, ABSA GALLERY, Johannesburg

2004
City Berlin, JABLONSKI STRASSE STUDIO, Berlin
An African in Ireland, ENNISKERRY GALLERY, Dublin
Celebrating 10 Years of Democracy, EVERARD READ GALLERY, Johannesburg
Town/Country, CAROL LEE FINE ART, Johannesburg

2003
Joburg Notes, CAROL LEE FINE ART, Johannesburg
Sedibeng Sa Limpho, SOAN STUDIO, London

2002
Inside-Out, CAROL LEE FINE ART, Cape Town
Groundings, THIRD EYE GALLERY, Cape Town

2001
Up and Coming, SOAN STUDIO, London
South African Landscape, UNISA ART GALLERY, Pretoria
Karoo, BRONZE AGE FOUNDRY, Cape Town

2000
Turning Heads, SOAN STUDIO, London
Karoo Scapes, OPEN WINDOW ART ACADEMY, Pretoria
South African Landscapes, CAROL LEE FINE ART, Johannesburg

1999
Contemporary South African Landscapes, KLEIN KAROO KUNSETFEES, Oudtshoorn

COLLECTIONS

Absa Bank; Webber Wentzel Bowens; KPMG; Sasol; Rhodes University; General Cologne; Rosengarten-Rosin & Wright; J.P.Morgan; SAB Miller; Nedcor; Clifford Chance UK, Modise Attorneys; Ashanti Gold; Novocol.

== Bibliography ==
- De Vries, Fred. The Fred de Vries Interviews: from Abdullah to Zille. Wits University Press, 2008.

A collection of 39 interviews with South Africans of note, this book includes an interview with Hermann Niebuhr.

- De Vries, Fred. "Joburg ‘teases, inspires, tears me apart,’" Business Day, April 21, 2007.

Excerpt: "Niebuhr's latest project is the logical follow-up to his 2005 exhibition, Night Ride Home, which encapsulated the nightly journeys from his studio in Fordsburg to his house in Kensington. It resulted in a beautiful, almost dreamlike overview at the Absa Gallery, full of blurred visions and shattered lights, a kind of Edward Hopper for the 21st century. The new paintings seem to go even deeper. “As your language develops you're able to describe more authentically the things you can see," says Niebuhr. “That's what I'm doing now. I go into the buildings. And once you're inside, they will still carry the knowledge from when you first saw them and thought: ‘Oh my God’."

- Dodd, Alexandra. "On the Stoep in Fordsburg," Business Day, December 2005.

Excerpt: "Niebuhr’s recent depopulated cityscapes are infused with the speed and pace of the city. More about selection and reduction than direct representation, they capture a sense of how it feels to be downtown."

- Dodd, Alexandra. Catalog for Night Shift. 2008.

Excerpt: "In the sense that Niebuhr is recording lived life in the city right now, he is a documentarist, but his practice as a painter militates against the objectivity and immediacy of social realist endeavours."

- Huddleston, Sarah. "A Lighter Approach to Painting Places", The Weekender, March 7, 2009. Preview of exhibition "Champagne for my Facebook Friends."

Excerpt: “Compared with my last show, this one is much lighter,” Niebuhr says. Niebuhr's paintings of distorted portraits of people began with a request to paint a nude for an exhibition. He photographed a figure through glass bricks and then painted this muddled image. The works are reminiscent of the distorted portraits of Francis Bacon, who coined the phrase “Champagne for my real friends, real pain for my sham friends.”

- Larkin, Naomi. "The Shopper: Naomi Larkin," The Times, May 2, 2009. Interview with House & Leisure editor Naomi Larkin about her favorite home items.

Excerpt: "Best all-time purchase: A painting by Hermann Niebuhr."

- Leibov, Bernard. "Into Stillness." July 6, 2014. Observations on Niebuhr's artist residency at BOXO in Joshua Tree, California.

Excerpt: "Hermann drove off on several exploratory trips including a one day marathon to Amboy, Death Valley, Johannesburg, CA and back. Phew. Some rich material quickly flowed from these bursts of energy. On the night following the full moon, we undertook a moonlit bicycle ride in the National Park which sparked the inspiration for one of the large canvases."

- Leyden, Mirelle. "finders keepers," Visi, Autumn 2008. Interview with art gallery owners in Johannesburg, including Frances Coulter, who curated Niebuhr's exhibit Night Shift, pictured in the article.
- Malaba, Frank. "Interview on Business Arts South Africa on Radio Today" Journalist Frank Malaba interviews artist Hermann Niebuhr about the stories behind the landscape paintings in the November 2013 exhibition "Stillness," and the opening evening collaboration with musician Chris Letcher and filmmaker Lloyd Ross.
- Masie, Desne. "Nightshift, an exhibition by Hermann Niebuhr," Financial Mail, March 7, 2008.

Excerpt: "The paintings depict the foyers of Hillbrow flats. Stark and provocative, they encourage you to look a little deeper and even make you want to venture inside. But a strange silence resonates from them. They show the quiet mystery of the city's witching hour - 3 am - when security guards (though neither they nor other people feature) pass the hours watching over sleeping flat-dwellers."

- Rogers, Douglas. "The Karoo: South Africa’s Living Desert", Travel+Leisure, March 2008.

Excerpt: "His name is Hermann Niebuhr, and he’d stunned us all after we graduated from university in South Africa in the mid-90s by buying a tumbledown tin-roof shack in a remote Karoo dorp (village) where, he said, he planned to live the life of the ascetic artist, painting desolate landscapes populated by scrub, sand, and rusty windmills. Ah well, to each his own."

- Shackleford, Graeme. "Art Scene: Niebuhr paints the city", Rosebank Killarney Gazette, January 2012.

Excerpt: "The artist sees himself as a chronicler of an outer and an inner landscape. 'I'm inspired by the city - it's the drama of a deeply problematic space that is contested and unequal. I'd like to think that my work gets to the heart of the South African condition. Johannesburg is the microcosm of South Africa's story,' he said."

- Shackleford, Graeme. "Capturing Stillness on Canvas", "Rosebank Killarney Gazette", November 2013.

Excerpt: "Artist Hermann Niebuhr, known for his cityscapes that seem to pulsate with the very life of Johannesburg itself, made a departure from the theme in preparation for his upcoming exhibition.Titled Stillness, Niebuhr’s new body of work has its point of origin in the artist’s quest to find a point of stillness and balance, following personal trials and tribulations.“This series of paintings started after some major life changes. I went through a trying time, and took up meditation to try cope, regroup and find my haven,” he said.Along with meditation, Niebuhr also took up cycling, and spent 12 days riding in the Himalayas with a group of friends, which he described as an “incredible journey”. The cyclists also rode through De Hel, somewhat closer to home.“Passing through these landscapes was conducive to finding paintings, and I found they possessed the sense of the stillness I was after. I wanted to paint works that evoke a sense of stillness in the viewer,” he said.

- Shapshak, Toby. "Gifted", Wanted, July 2008. The journalist names his print of Niebuhr's painting Homage as one of his top ten most precious possessions.
- Talotta, Josef. "Hot Stuff!", Wanted, December 2007. An article about Niebuhr's painting Expedition, about global warming in Antarctica, shown at the United Nations Gallery.
- van Heerden, Carina. "Mine Dumps", Dekat, December 2009. An article featuring and quoting Niebuhr on the mine dumps and their historical impact on Joburg. Includes reproductions of paintings from the mine exhibition.

Excerpt: “Without the gold mines Johannesburg would not have been here, and the mine dumps are what’s left of that era,” says Hermann. “That’s why the mine dumps are so specifically ‘Johannesburg’: they are handmade and iconic and they represent the reasons why we’re here.”
