= David Kuijers =

South African painter (born 1962)

David Kuijers is a South African painter.

Kuijers was born on 30 March 1962 in Vanderbijlpark, near Johannesburg, of Dutch immigrant parents. He completed his schooling at the School of Art, Music and Ballet in Pretoria achieving a distinction in Graphics and in 1980 received the best Painter award. After a brief period as a sign writer, he completed a Graphic Design Diploma at the Cape Technikon, majoring in illustration. On graduating in 1989, he was awarded the Designer/Illustrator merit award.

Kuijers freelanced briefly as a designer and illustrator, but now paints full-time. He regularly takes part in group exhibitions and has completed various commissions, notably acrylic seascapes for the new President Hotel and watercolours for the Villa Via Hotel and the Volks Hospital. He now lives in Greyton in the Western Cape with his wife, daughter and two sons, where he owns his own art studio.
