= Natasha Bowdoin =

American artist (born 1981)

- Born: 1981 (age 44–45); West Kennebunk, Maine, U.S.
- Education: Brandeis University (BA); Tyler School of Art (MFA)
- Occupation: Artist

Natasha Bowdoin (born 1981) is an American artist. She was born in West Kennebunk, Maine, but now works and lives in Houston, Texas. She is known for her three-dimensional paper collages that explore the intersection of literature, visual art, and nature. Many of her installations are done on a large-scale, which creates an immersive experience that forces her viewer to challenge their relationship with the natural world. Bowdoin credits her childhood spent roaming the wilderness of Maine—and love of fantastical literary works like Alice in Wonderland—as her works' inspiration.

Bowdoin is currently working as an associate professor at Rice University. She earned her BA in Classics and Studio Art from Brandeis University (2003) and then went on to obtain a MFA from Tyler School of Art (2007). In addition, she has completed several residencies and created a public artwork for Rice University.

== Collections ==
Bodoin's work is included in the permanent collections of the Museum of Fine Arts Houston and the Anderson Museum of Contemporary Art.
