= Allerley Glossop =

British-South African artist

- Born: Alice Glossop; 1870; Twickenham, United Kingdom
- Died: 1955 (aged 84–85); Lion's River, kwaZulu-Natal, South Africa
- Education: Slade School of Fine Art; Westminster School of Art

Allerley Glossop (1870–1955) was a British-South African artist known particularly for her landscape and pastoral scenes.

== Biography ==
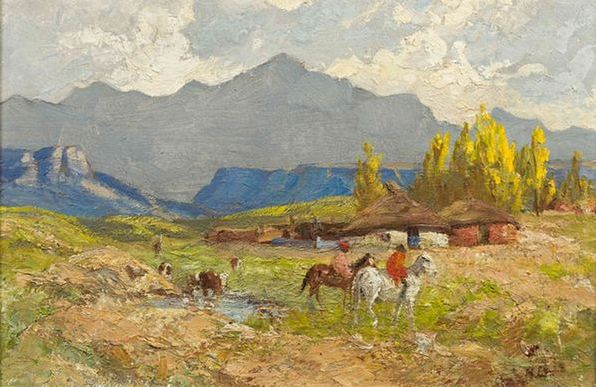
Riders in Lesotho by Allerley Glossop, c. 1946

Glossop was born Alice Glossop into a middle-class family in Twickenham, in West London, the daughter of George Glossop, the vicar of Twickenham, and his wife Eliza.

Glossop studied painting at the Slade School of Fine Art in London under Charles Holroyd and modelling under George Frampton, and studied under William Mouat Loudan at the Westminster School of Art. She also worked under Arthur Elsley and Solomon Solomon, and taught at their short-lived art school, the Sphinx Studio, until it closed in 1900.

Glossop moved to Cape Colony in 1900, farming and painting first at Klapmuts in the Western Cape, and was an active member of the South African Society of Artists (SASA), serving on the Society's Council between 1902 and 1906. She habitually transgressed the gender roles assigned to a single white woman in colonial South Africa by dressing in men's clothing (she was known to her close friends as "Joe"), wearing a pith helmet, smoking a pipe and venturing alone into rural areas to paint. Between 1902 and 1917 she farmed in Wellington, Western Cape, and in 1917 moved to Johannesburg.

Glossop was a friend of the artist Madge Tennent, who portrayed her as "Jill of all trades, and master of most of them... who, if she was busy, would slip a delicately beaded white chiffon dinner dress over her riding trousers and high leather boots, to arrive at a dinner party with a riding crop instead of a bag." Tennent states that after the First World War Glossop bartered her paintings for butter, flour and eggs in order to provide her farm hands with extra food; and describes her as a "spartan", "self-possessed by nature and training", who "loved freedom... a slim intrepid woman, with her wide human interests, and zest for work... poised squarely in the path of life, like a bright eagle ready to fly the wind against any wrong done to the young, weak or innocent".

In 1925 she moved to Lion's River in kwaZulu-Natal, and worked from there until her death in 1955.

Glossop exhibited in South Africa and abroad, including: 1902–1903 SASA annual exhibitions in Cape Town; 1910 exhibition of the South African Fine Arts Association, Cape Town; 1917–1919 SASA annual art exhibitions, Cape Town; 1920–1924 South African Academy of Art annual exhibition, Johannesburg; 1924 British Empire Exhibition, Wembley; 1924 SASA annual exhibition, Cape Town; 1935 exhibition of contemporary art, South African National Gallery; 1936 SASA annual exhibition, Cape Town; and the 1937 exhibition of contemporary art, South African National Gallery.

Glossop's work is represented in Durban Art Gallery; Ann Bryant Art Gallery in East London; Albany Museum, Grahamstown; Johannesburg Art Gallery; South African National Gallery, Cape Town; the University of Cape Town art collection; William Humphreys Art Gallery, Kimberley and the Pretoria Art Museum.

== Bibliography ==
- Olsen, Rider (1933). Who's Who in Natal: with which is incorporated Women of Natal. Knox Printing & Publishing, Durban.
- Meissner, Günter (1992). Allgemeines Künstlerlexikon. Walter de Gruyter, Berlin.
- Tennent, Madge (1949). Autobiography of an Unarrived Artist. Columbia University Press, New York.
- "Tatham Art Gallery: Into The Light, Works by KwaZulu-Natal Women Artists". Tatham Art Gallery, Pietermaritzburg. 2009. Archived from the original on 9 May 2017.
- "Allerley Glossop". South African History Online, Cape Town. 2011.
