= Anja Marais =

South African sculptor and multi-disciplinary artist

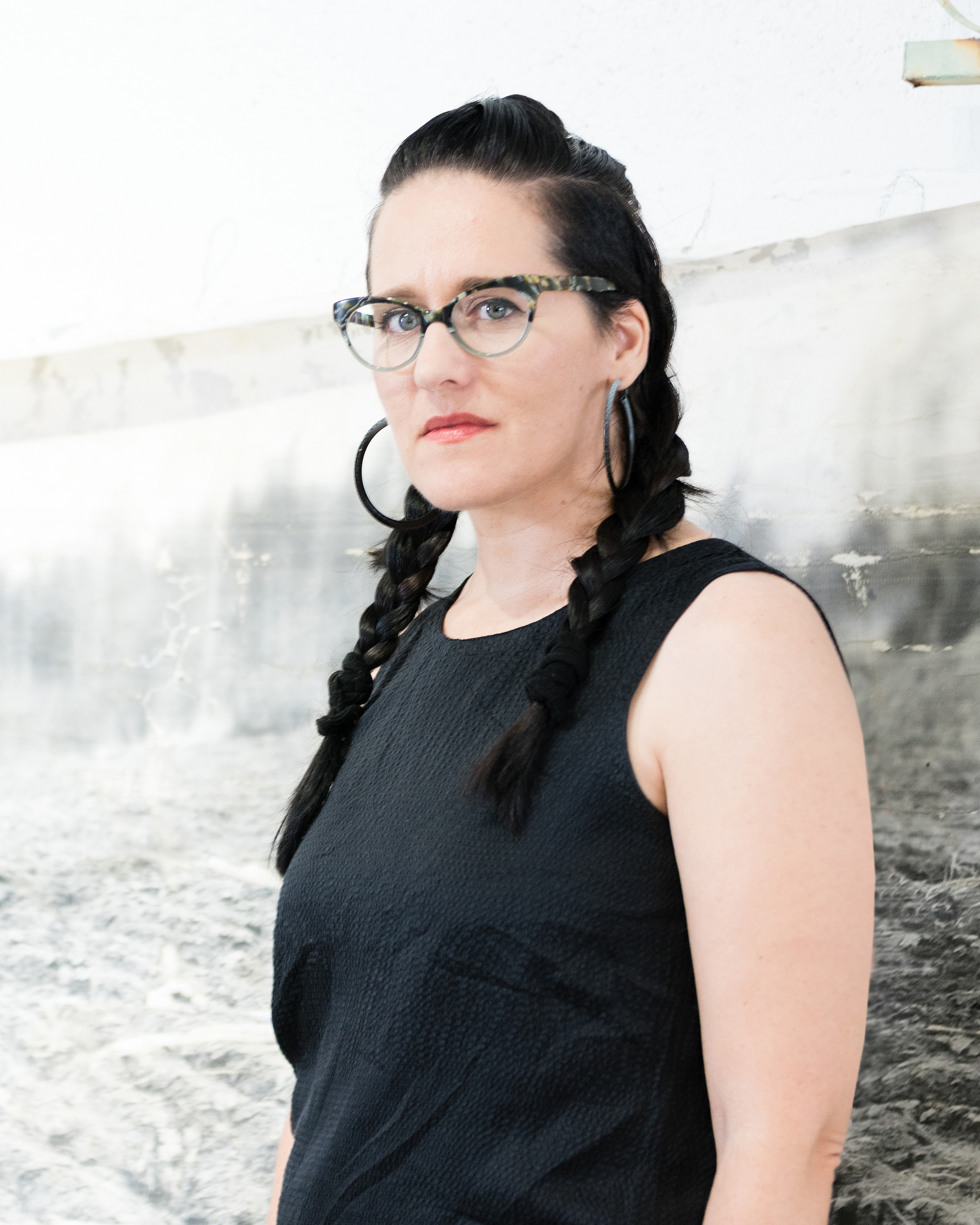
- Born: 1974 (age 51–52); Sabie, Mpumalanga, South Africa
- Occupations: sculptor, photographer, filmmaker
- Years active: 2000-present

Anja Marais (born 1974) is a South African sculptor and multi-disciplinary artist. She has completed residencies in Japan, Korea, Russia and Florida and completed solo and group shows in Asia, Europe and the US.

Hal Bromm

== Biography ==
Anja Marais was born in 1974 Sabie, Mpumalanga, South Africa. She attended the University of Pretoria where she studied visual arts and graduated with honors from the University of South Africa in Pretoria in 1998. After graduation, she moved to Florida where she became the recipient of the Florida Individual Artist Grant and was selected as a participant for the Creative Capitol Professional workshop by the Florida Division of Cultural Affairs. Her work has appeared in Art in America, Artnews and the Florida International Magazine.

In 2009, she completed the Mino Paper Art Residency, learning ancient paper-making techniques from Japanese masters. Marais went to Korea in 2010 for the Seoul Art Space Geumcheon Residency and in 2013, she completed the NCCA Art-residency in Kronstadt, Russia. Marais’ sculptures and installations examine contradictions and life cycles like masculine-feminine, life-death, nurture-nature and their fragility and delicacy.

Marais has produced solo shows in Miami, Florida; Seoul, South Korea; St. Mary's City, Maryland; Key West, Florida; and Smyrna Beach and has participated in group shows in Basel, Switzerland; Miami; Havana, Cuba; Sarasota, Florida; Cannes, France;St. Petersburg, Russia and New York, United States. Her works are part of collections in the Akari Museum, Mino City, Japan; Barry D. Briskin, Chair of American Folk Art Museum, Private Collection, NY; Jean Carper Private Collection, Key West, FL; Museum of Contemporary Art, Miami, FL; Ed Reilly Private Collection, New York, NY, Hal Bromm and Doneley Meris Collection, New York; and Victoria Lesser Private Collection, North Branch, NY. In 2015, she was touring with a multi-media exhibit called “The Ballast” and was featured in a solo exhibit in Greeley, Colorado.
