= Luci Collins =

Former gymnast

Luci Collins Cummings is a former gymnast and one of the first black Olympians in the sport of gymnastics for the United States. Collins was a member of the 1980 US Olympic Team, although she did not get to compete due to the USA boycotting the 1980 games. She is credited with being the first female black Olympian on Team USA. Her parents were both Creole from New Orleans, Louisiana.

Collins was raised in Inglewood, California, a predominantly black area of Los Angeles County. She currently works for a water department.
