= Jo Smail =

South African born American visual artist

- Born: 1943 (age 82–83); Durban, South Africa
- Known for: Painting, collage, drawing
- Notable work: Mongrel Collection; Flying with Remnant Wings
- Spouse: Julien Davis
- Children: 3
- Awards: Pollock-Krasner Foundation Fellowship
- Website: josmailartist.com

Jo Smail (born 1943) is an American artist born and educated in Durban, South Africa. Smail emigrated to the United States in 1985.

== Early life and education ==
Smail was born and raised in Durban, South Africa. There she received a degree in English and in history. After having three children, she attended art school.

== Career ==
Her work in painting, collage and drawing has been described as "poetic annotations." Her series of works, “Mongrel Collection,” from 2018 incorporate fragments of printed fabric, drawing and pigment prints mounted on eccentrically shaped MDF board.

Her retrospective exhibition, Flying with Remnant Wings, was presented at the Baltimore Museum of Art in 2021. She has collaborated on numerous works with the artist William Kentridge during the early years of the 2000s.

She has received reviews in the New York Times, Baltimore Magazine, Art In America, Hyperallergic, Artforum, among other publications.

In 1996, a significant amount of her work was destroyed in a fire at her studio in the Clipper Mill Industrial Park in Baltimore. She lost 25 years worth of work in the fire that engulfed her studio. After the fire, her work developed an autobiographical tendency.

Smail taught at the Johannesburg College of Art, the University of the Witwatersrand and at the Maryland Institute College of Art.

== Collections ==
Her work is included in the permanent collections of the Baltimore Museum of Art, the Johannesburg Art Museum, the National Gallery of South Africa among other venues. In 1996 she received a Pollock-Krasner Foundation Fellowship.

== Personal life ==
Smail is married to Julien Davis, a research scientist and photographer. In 2000, she suffered a stroke and lost the ability to walk and speak. She continued to make art beginning with drawings and paintings that depicted "silence and sounds that became a new kind of language." She later regained her mobility and the ability to speak.
