= Thenjiwe Nkosi =

South African artist

Thenjiwe Niki Nkosi (born 1980) is a South African-American painter and multi-media artist. In 2019, she won the 15th Tollmand Award, an annual South African award for visual artist.

== Early years and education ==
Nkosi was born in 1980 in New York to a South African father in exile and a Greek-American mother. She moved to Harare in 1989 then Johannesburg in 1992. She holds a bachelor's degree from Harvard University and an MFA from the School of Visual Arts in New York.

== Career ==
Usually, Nkosi's works investigate power and its structures in politics, architecture and society. She has exhibited her paintings and films in several countries including South Africa, United States, United Kingdom, France, Germany, Vernice and Portugal. Some of the shows she has exhibited at include; the Standard Bank Gallery in Johannesburg, the ifa Gallery in Berlin, the South London Gallery and Tate Modern in London, the Museum of Contemporary Art in Rio de Janeiro, Joburg Pavilion at the 56th Venice Biennale and the Fondation Louis Vuitton in Paris. She has been an artist in residence at the XXVIIes Aterliers Internationaux, FRAC des Pays de la Loire in France, VAIVEM in Sao Paulo, Vanilla Facts in Berlin, Cruces International, Montevideo and the Bag Factory Artist Residency.

Nkosi’s first solo show at Stevenson Gallery in Johannesburg, entitled “Gymnasium” opened in June 2020. Speaking on "Gymnasium", Thenjiwe says "I wanted to draw attention to the relationship between the individual and the collective". Thenjiwe intends for her work to "bring to attention those in-between moments, which are often overlooked and undervalued as part of the processes of victory, as part of the performance"

Nkosi’s video piece "Suspension" (six minutes and 45 seconds long) was featured in a 2020 online show of video art. In “Suspension”, she cut together footage of Black elite gymnasts from all over the world in the moments just before their routines commenced. The New York Times review called the piece "sublime" and "the drop-everything-and-stream-it-now achievement of [the] video exhibition" in which it was presented.

She has often collaborated with artist collaborative MADEYOULOOK with Molemo Moiloa and Nare Mokgotho, as well as with Pamela Phatsimo Sunstrum.

== Personal life ==
Nkosi is a mother of one child. She lives and works in Johannesburg.

== Awards ==
- 2004 - Philippe Wamba Prize in African Studies
- 2019 - 15th Tollmand Award
