= Carla Liesching =

South African artist (born 1985)

- Born: 1985 (age 40–41); Cape Town, South Africa
- Education: Rhodes University
- Known for: Photography
- Website: carlaliesching.com

Carla Liesching (born 1985) is a South African artist based in Ithaca, New York.

== Early life and education ==
Carla Liesching was born in Cape Town in 1985 and was raised in various small towns around SA, mainly in the Eastern Cape. She received her BFA, specialising in photography, video and sound installation, from Rhodes University in Grahamstown and moved to Johannesburg shortly after graduating in 2007.

== Life and work ==
She has spent time working in Taipei, Taiwan and is currently based in New York City.

Her work investigates human relationships to structure, particularly ideological shifts in geographic organisation and narrative. Liesching's practice addresses conceptions of self in relation to place, movement, distance and belonging. Interested in the photographic portrait's agency in the shaping of identity narratives, Liesching creates archives of staged environmental portraits, which parodically hearken back to the medium's early involvement with human classification systems and pseudo-scientific exploration (for example, photography used in the aid of physiognomy, physical anthropology, phrenology, Darwinism and colonialism. Liesching's installations often include sculptural and sound components alongside her photographic work.

Liesching is represented by Cape Town-based gallery Brundyn & Gonsalves.

Her series The Swimmers, shows people "in countries and cultures from all over the world, dressed in nothing but their bathing suits. Only the backgrounds are neither beaches, nor oceans [...] Instead, Liesching sets her subjects against abandoned factories, motionless waters, fields of grain and rough urban landscapes. [...] because they've grown up in a world that has changed too quickly and is losing all of its points of reference along the way [...] It's a way of underlining their desire to belong, their need for identity, while they live -- naked -- before the whole world."

Good Hope (2021) "critically examines South Africa's colonial past". The book is made up of both photographs and personal prose. The photographs—clippings of images from tourist pamphlets, old magazines, current newspapers and family albums—focus on the gardens and grounds of the Cape of Good Hope. The work is about colonialism, tourism and trade.

She is the program coordinator for the School of Criticism & Theory.

== Publications ==
- Good Hope. London: Mack, 2021. ISBN 978-1-913620-42-4.

== Solo exhibitions ==
- Masked Portraits, Gordart Gallery, Johannesburg, South Africa, 2008
- A Bear in The Woods, Moja Modern Gallery, Johannesburg, South Africa, 2008
- The Swimmers, iArt Gallery, Cape Town, South Africa, 2011
- Geography and Some Explorers, Brundyn & Gonsalves Gallery, South Africa, 2013

== Gallery of The Swimmers series ==
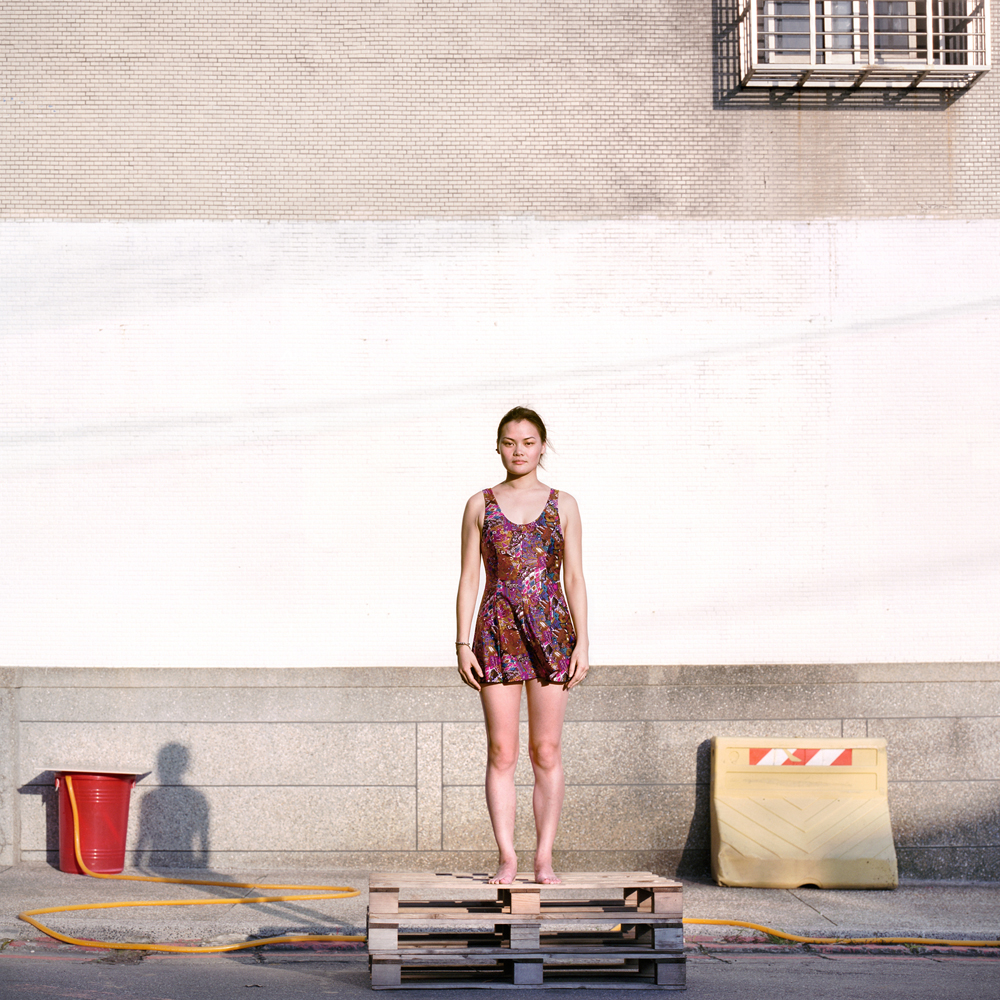

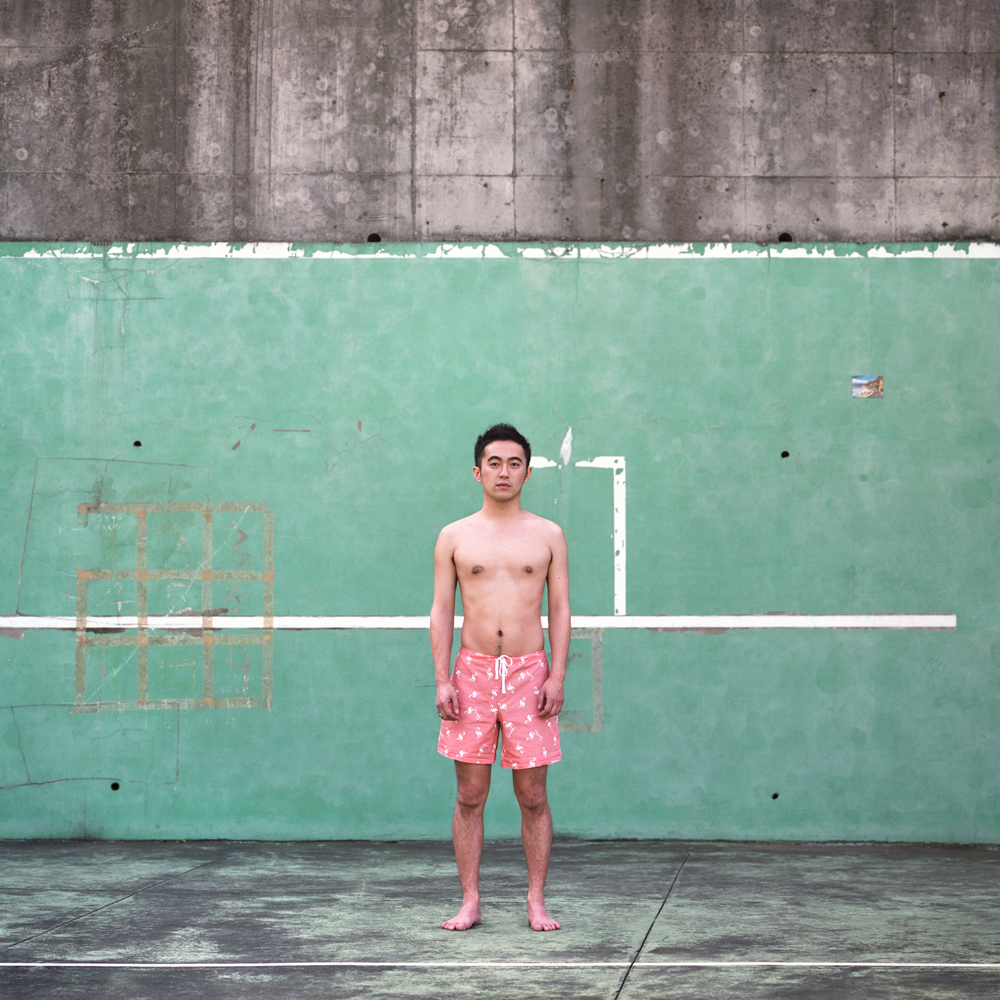

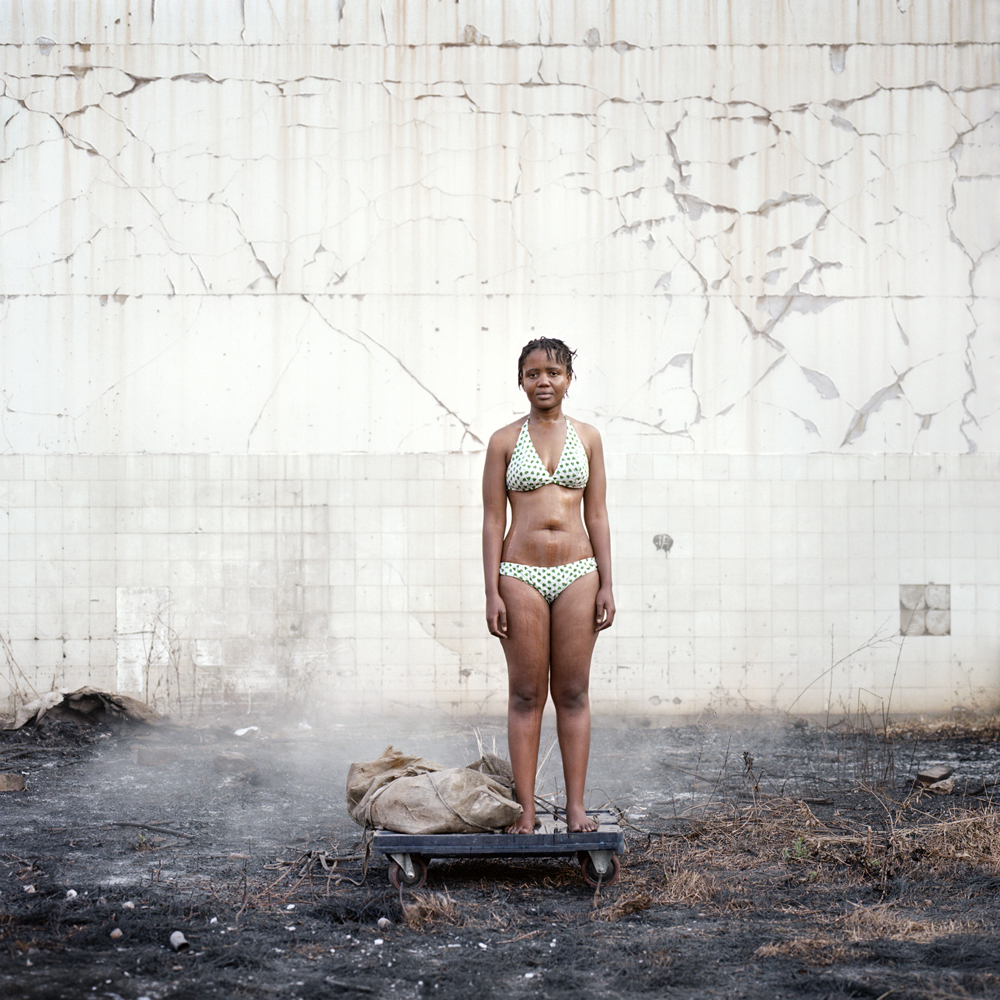

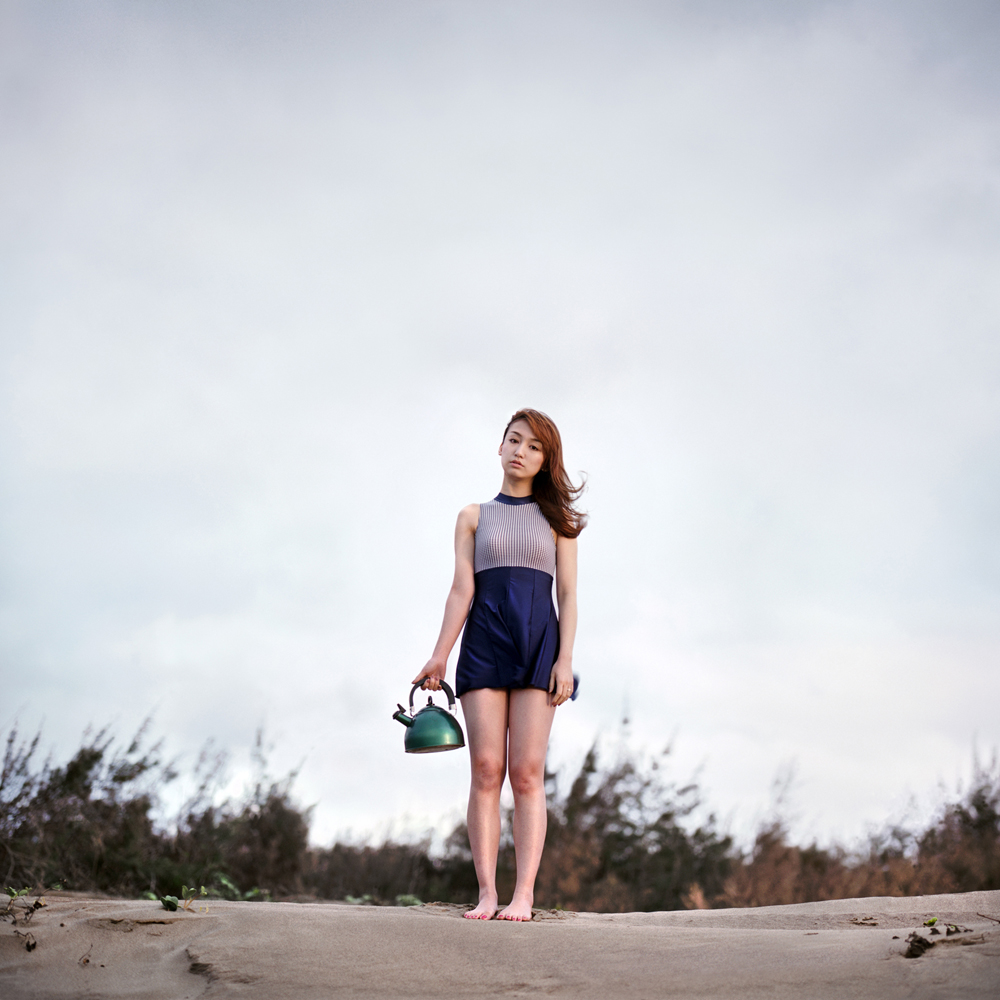

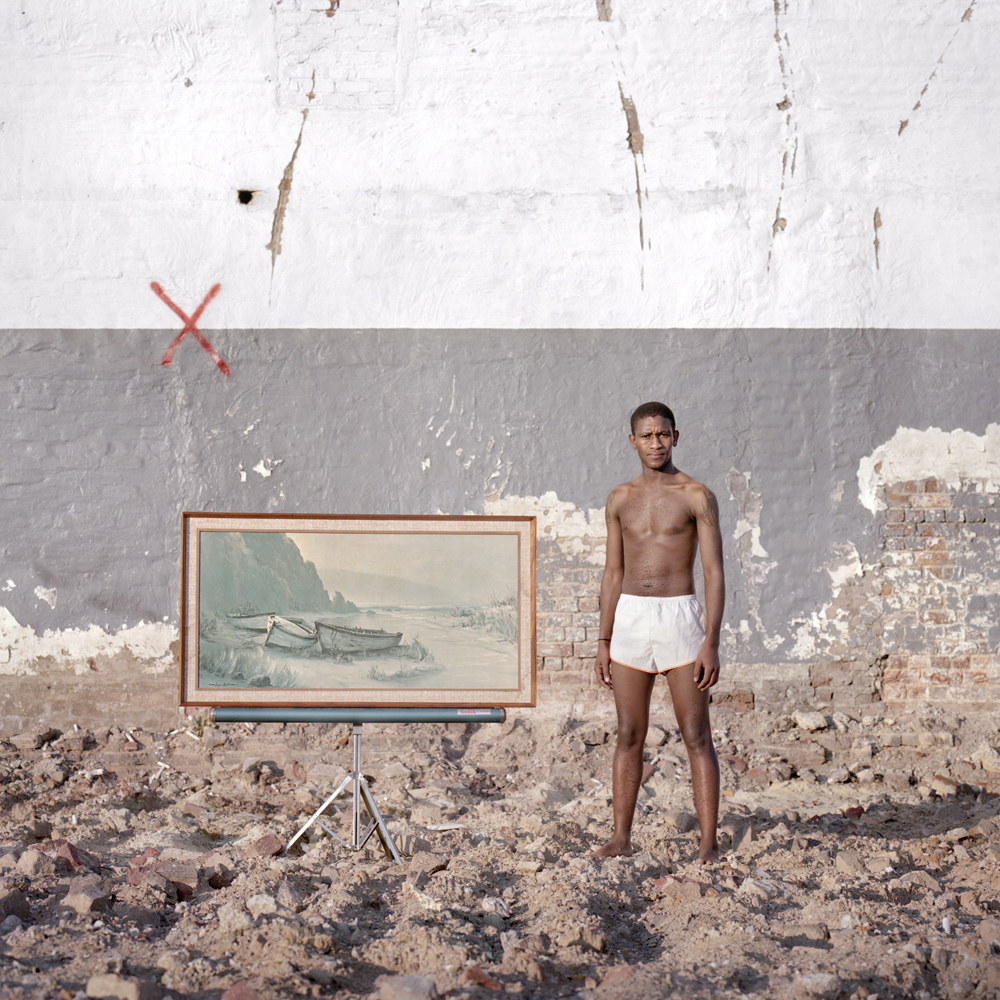

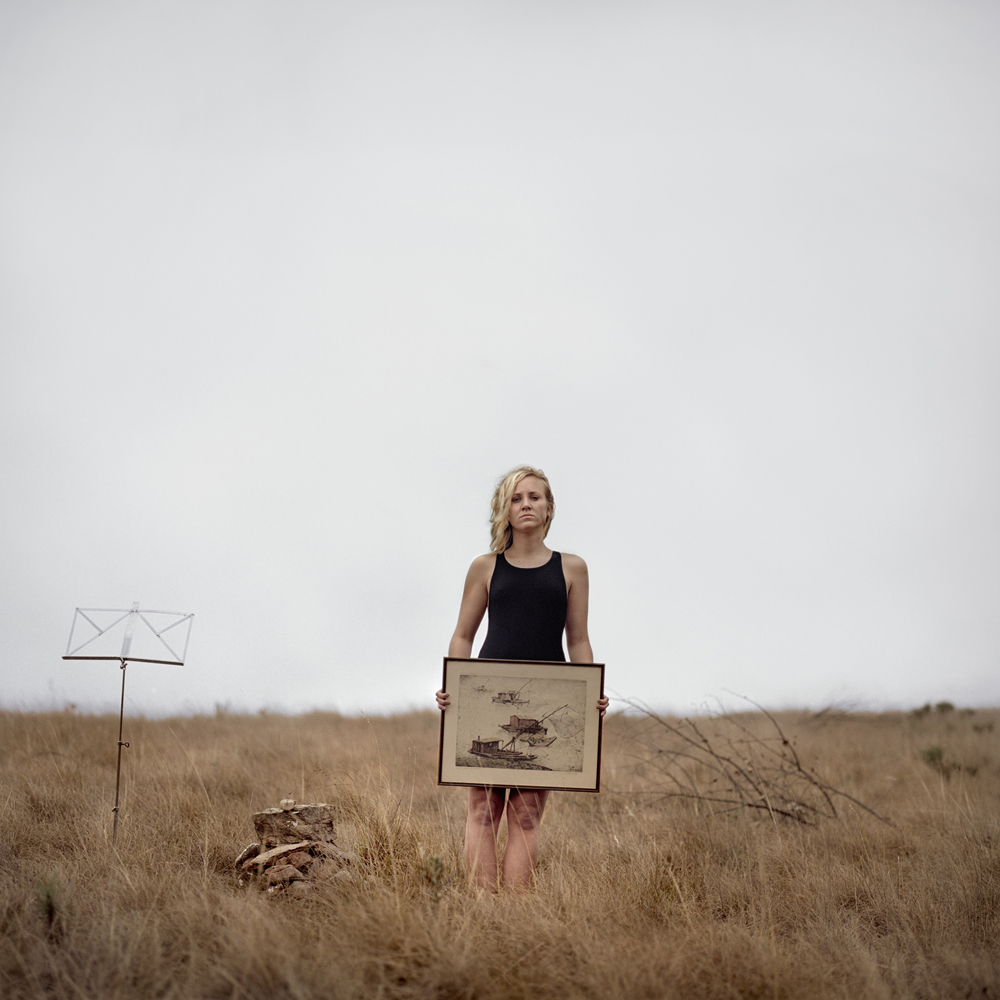

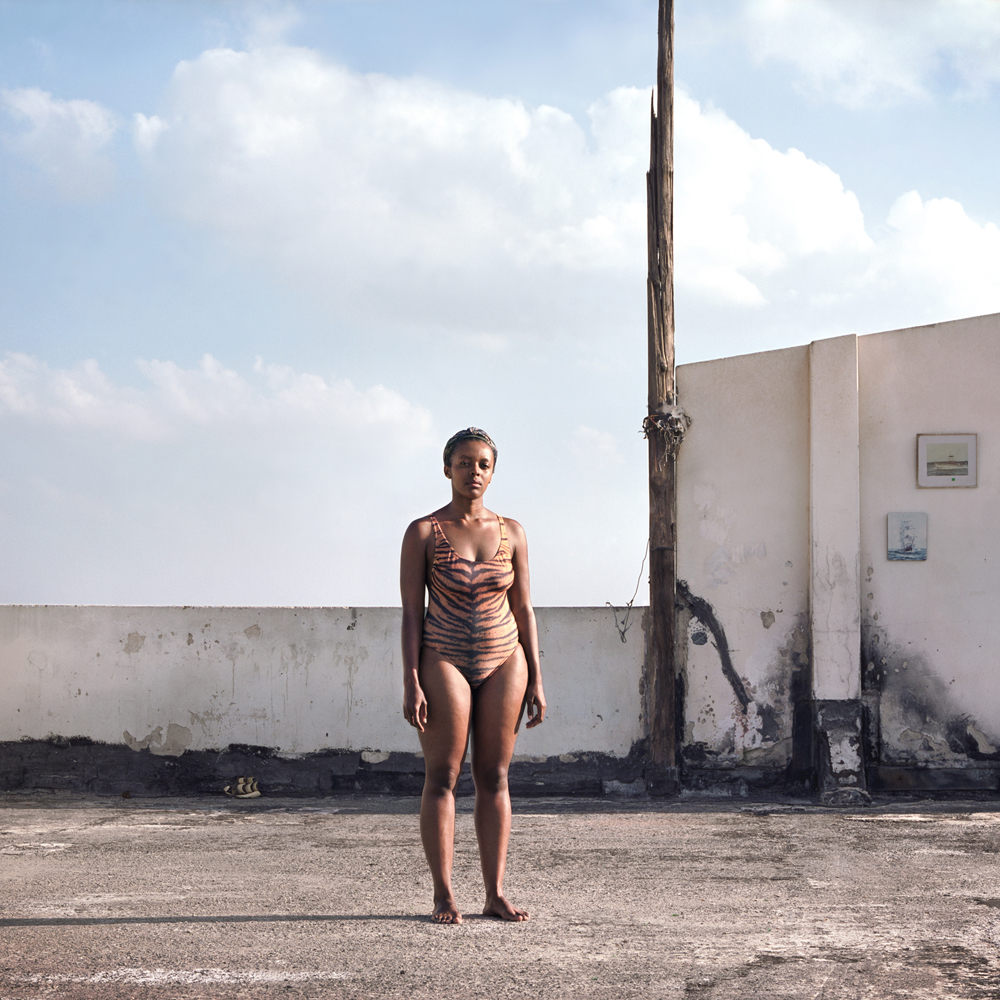

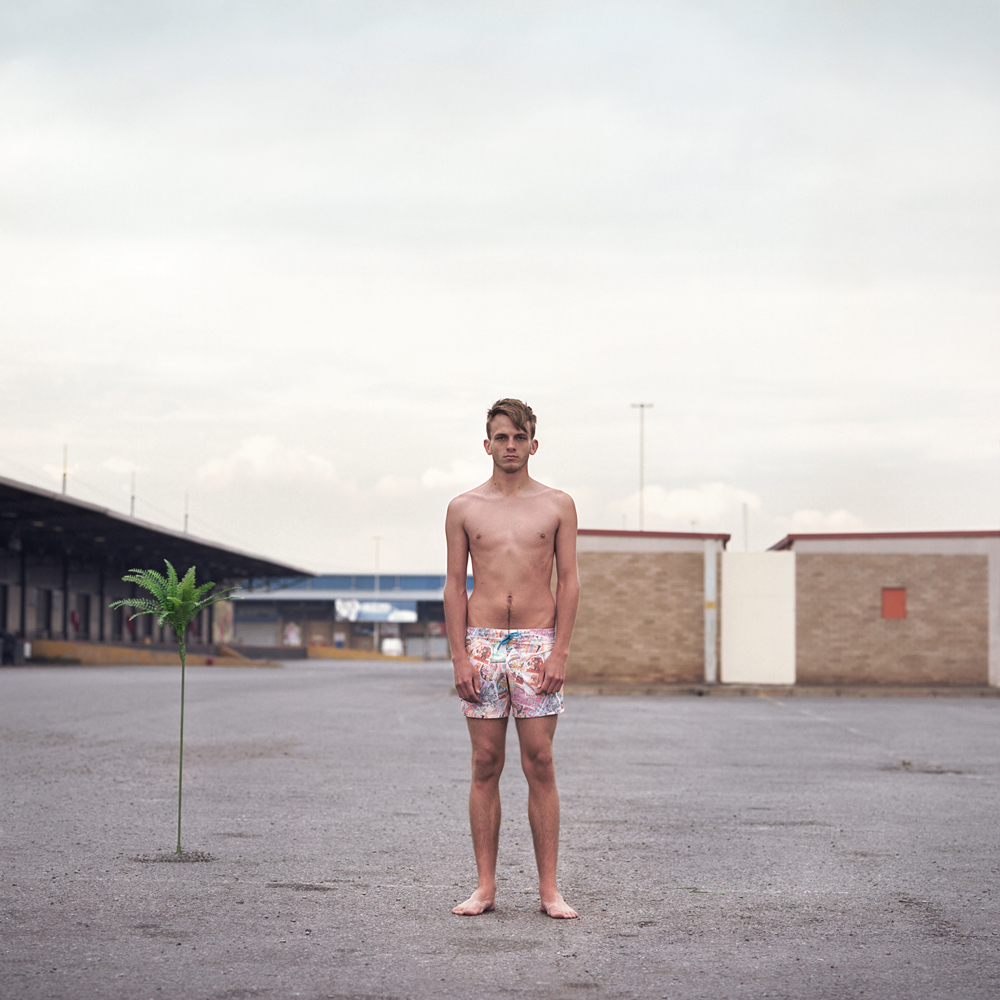

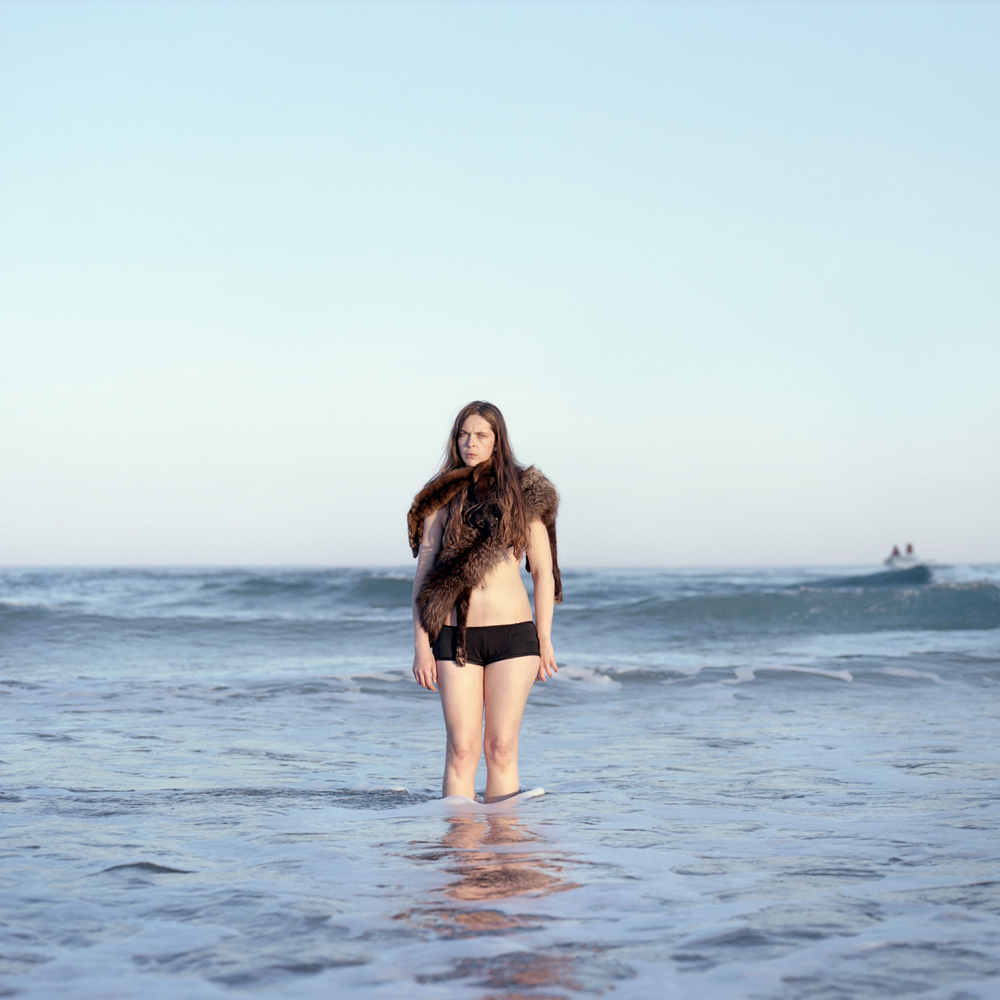

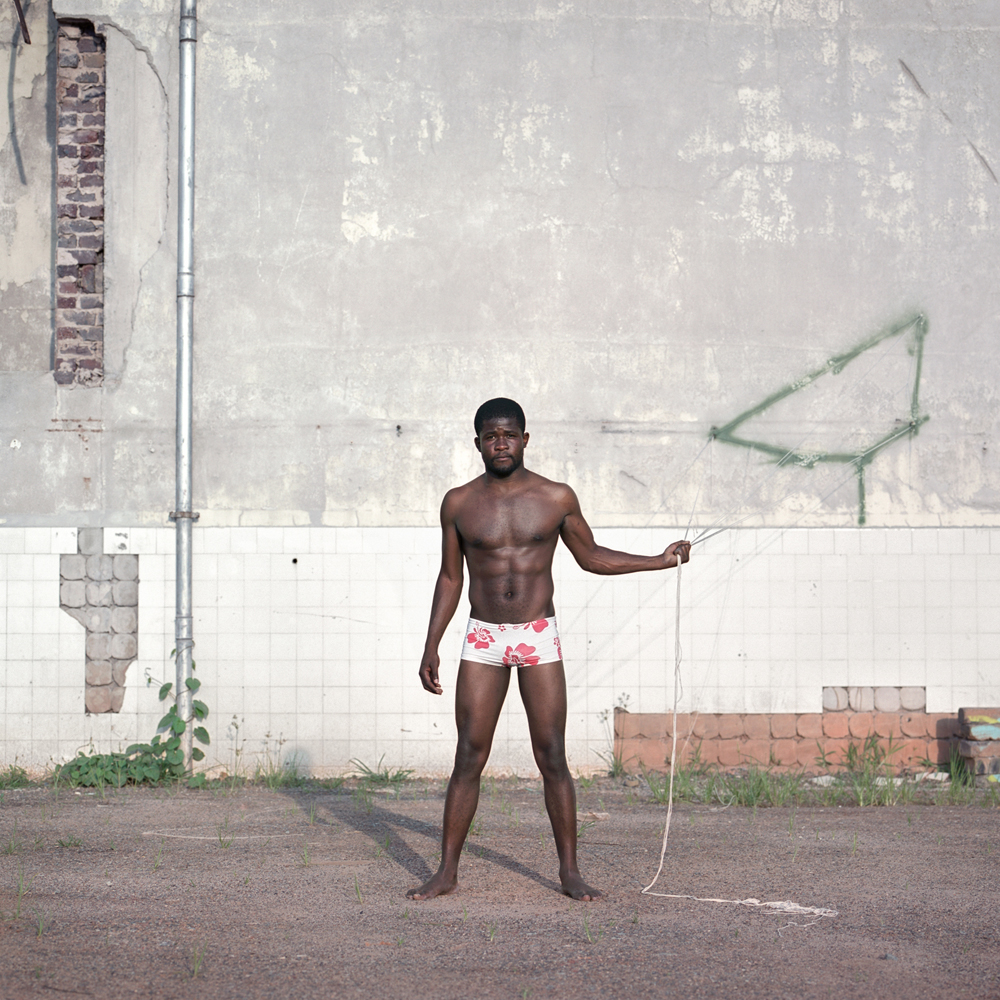

== Gallery of The Pocket series ==
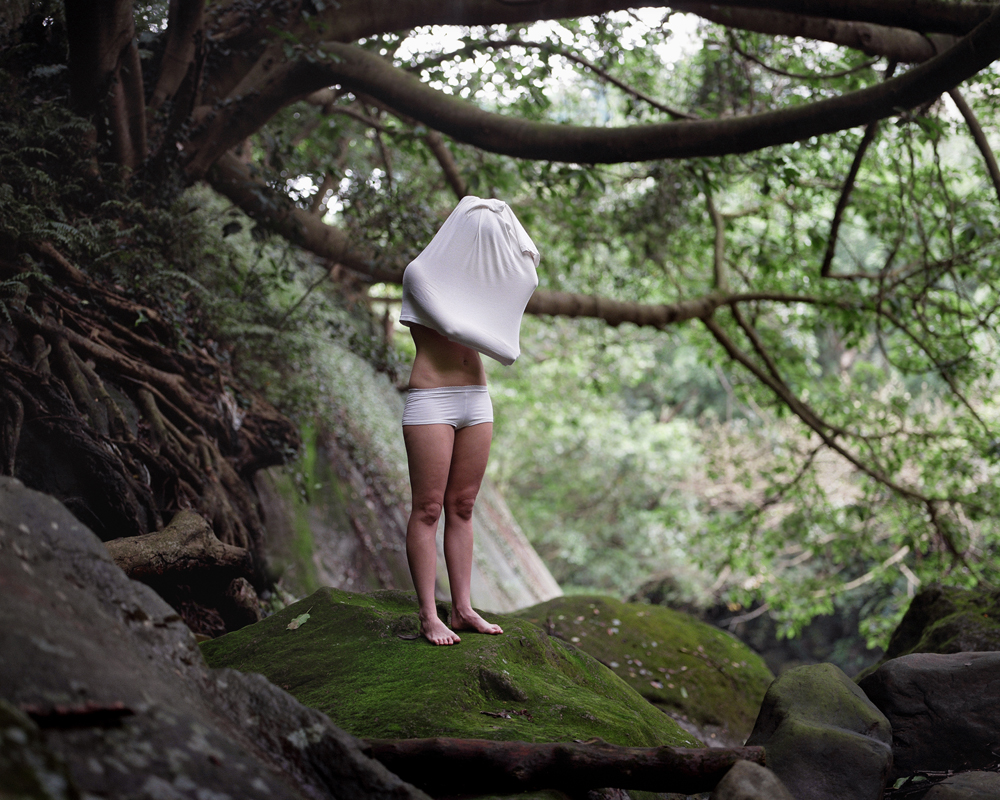

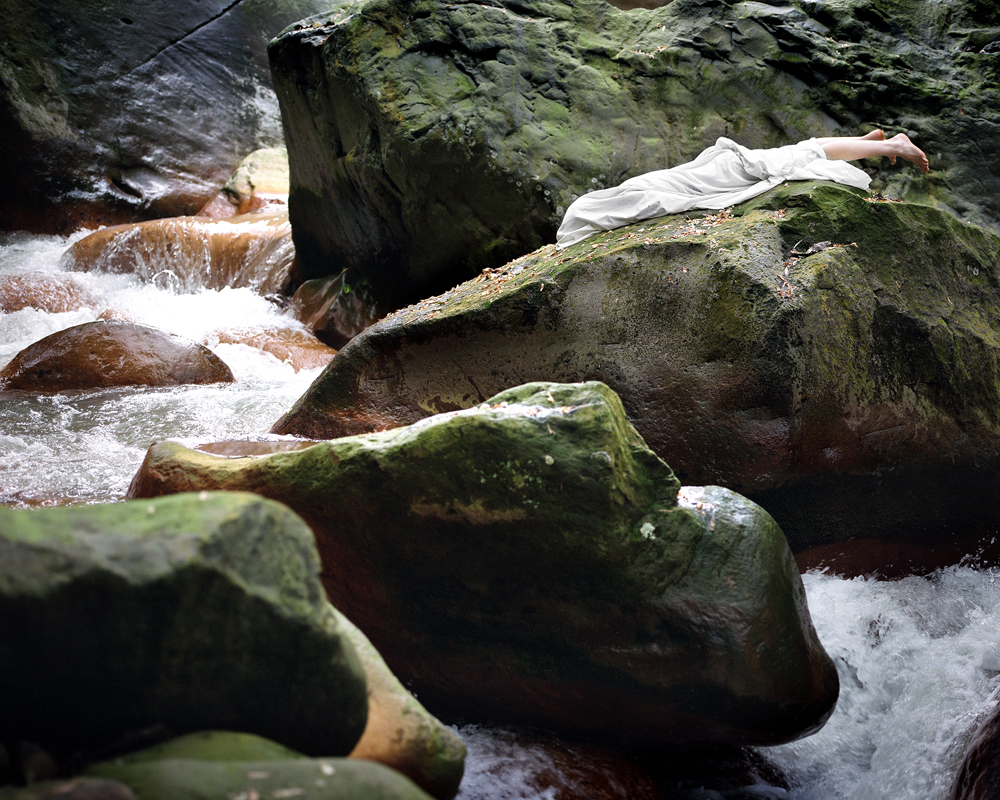
