= Kate Borcherding =

American artist working in mixed media (born 1960)

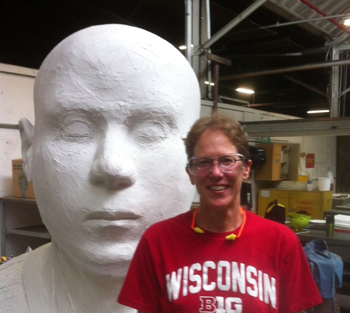
- Kate Borcherding as Artist-in-residence studio. Kohler Foundry, Village of Kohler, Wisconsin
- Born: Mary Kate Borcherding; October 26, 1960 (age 65); Palatine, Illinois, US
- Education: University of Wisconsin–Madison, B.S.; Indiana University Bloomington, Master of Fine Arts
- Known for: Mixed media; Printmaking; Sculpture; Ceramics; Photography

Kate Borcherding (born October 26, 1960) is an American artist working in mixed media. Her artistic style is both neoclassical and postmodern. Her art mainly focuses on the human figure, and tends to be psychological in nature with narratives expressed across multiple layers.

== Career ==
=== Sculpture ===
"The common thread in her work is its emotional strength, gestural qualities, layered textures, and the centrality of the human figure or the experience of being human." She often explores making invisible concepts visible: people in the act of thinking, narratives wherein something is hidden or revealed, and daily cycles of life against longer cycles of geologic or celestial time. "She is fascinated by the power of the human figure as it reaches monumental size, when it crosses the boundary and projects energy into an individual’s psychological space, when the art becomes participatory." By infusing the making of the art into the art, she captures a specific ‘moment in time’ that contrasts deep rhythms and underlying forces. Her desire, conceptually parallel to different tempos of time outlined by historian Fernand Braudel, is to capture these human moments within the larger context of universal humanity.

=== Environmental Sculpture ===
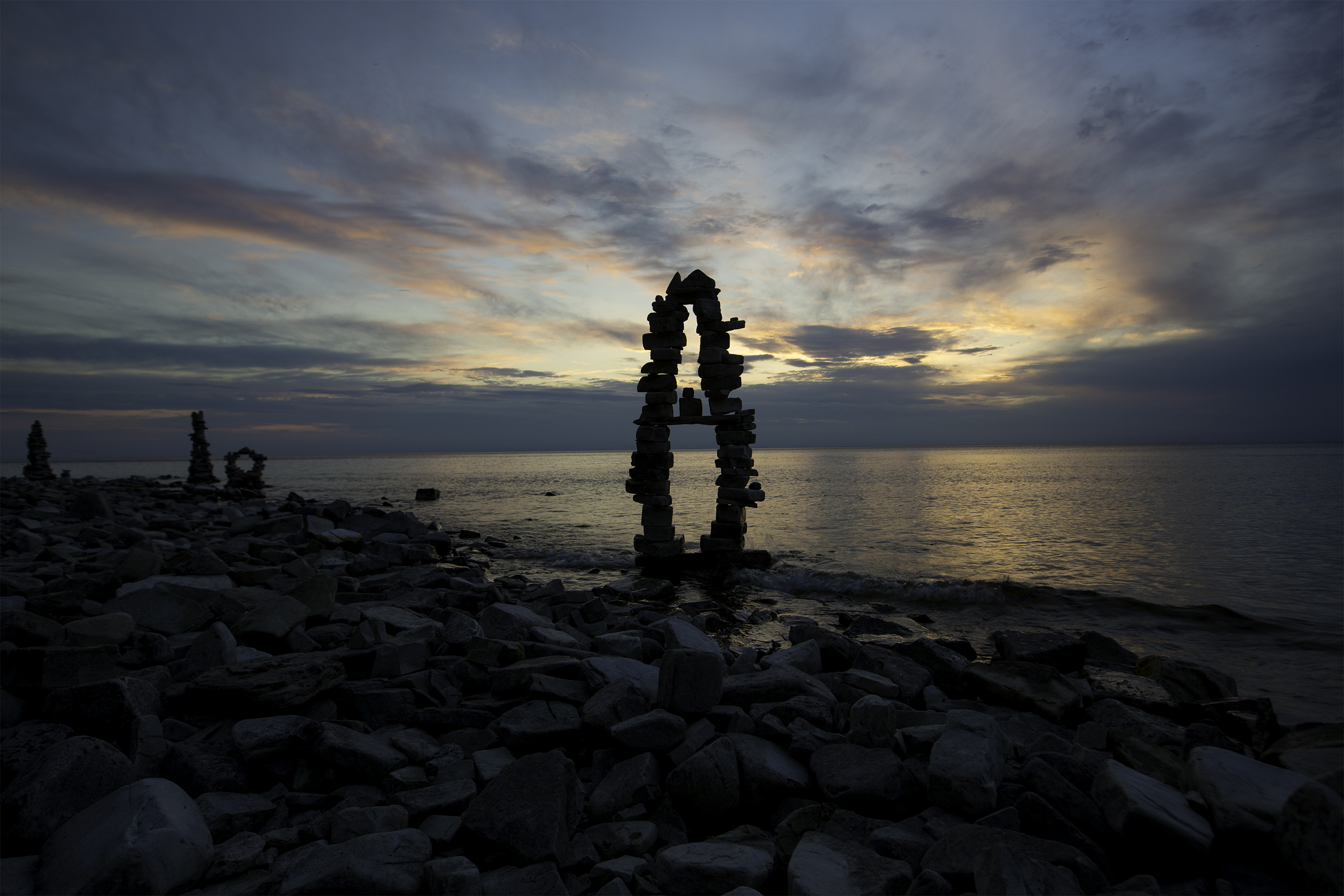
"Solstice Ellipse" from Memory Diaries Art Installation, 2013

Borcherding’s site-specific environmental sculpture pushes the space relationship between object and observer even further so that the observer walks into and on the art.

“When I came down here I had lots of sketches and ideas,” says Borcherding, an art professor at Sam Houston State University in Huntsville, Texas. "But then you quickly realize you can impose or you can take what’s here and run with it. So right now I’m chasing the project, rather than imposing.” With waders on, Borcherding creates many of her tall sculptures in the water. “They can stand on their own like a piece of art in the water, like it’s matted and framed,” she says. The marrying of natural elements with man-made organization also fascinates the artist. “As you change the edge to man-made and then let it go back to nature, it creates these natural punctuation marks or pauses. It’s interesting to see how far you have to go to create contrast.”

"You have the idea in your head but you can’t work on a grand scale, you just have to start. You start by placing objects … it is almost as if you are sketching out. And then you have to use the space as a catalyst. What makes an environmental art piece successful since it is on a grand scale and you as the viewer walk on to the piece, you are surrounded by the piece, you walk over the piece and you participate with it, so it becomes this full body experience that you have, which is different than you have if you would view just front on a sculpture or in the round in a gallery."

=== Ceramics ===
Her ceramic work focuses on the creation of assemblages incorporating either the human form or a personification of an object. She makes use of visual symbols which she extracts and extends from the direct observation of an environment including important cultural, architectural or technological representations. Projecting the object into the observers’ psychological space compels observers to “dive in” with their own humanity as an emotive participant in order to unfold the inner narrative of the art. Through this re-living of an inner world of an important period and place a universal moment from the past becomes alive.

=== Print work ===
Male Portrait with Sun, 2009

Borcherding's print work is described as “direct, strongly graphic, sinewy and somewhat raw and rough images with a strong clear component of feeling in the content or depiction”.

== Biographical ==
Borcherding's long studio career in visual arts is complemented with a commitment to art education which she fulfills through printmaking, ceramic and life drawing workshops. She is currently developing a drawing and anatomy curriculum for online education under the moniker “Art Team”. She is also an art professor at Sam Houston State University, where she has been employed since 1993. During the academic year she lives on a working horse and cattle ranch in Texas. Summers are enjoyed in and around Madison, Wisconsin.

== Awards and honors ==
- 2015 John Michael Kohler Arts Center, Arts/Industry Residency - Foundry
- 2013 Third Place Award, Amarillo Museum of Art AMoA Biennial 600: Printmaking, Roundtable III
- 2013 Juror’s Award Winner, Artlink 33rd National Print Exhibition, Male Portrait with Red Background
- 2012 Visiting Artist Baltimore Clayworks, Half Moving Memories
- 2012 First Place Award, Valdosta National, Valdosta, Georgia Small Dream Small Truth

== Exhibitions and installations ==
- 2015 "36th Annual Paper In Particular National Exhibition, a national juried exhibition, juror: Alida Fish, Sidney Larson Gallery, Columbia College, Columbia, MO", Celebration II
- 2015 "30th Annual International Exhibition: an international juried exhibition", juror: James Pace, Department of Art and Art History, University of Texas at Tyler, Tyler, Texas", "The Ventriloquists Melancholia II"
- 2015 "Monumental Ideas/Intimate Scale: A National Juried Exhibition", Southeast Missouri State University, River Campus, Cape Girardeau, MO
- 2015 Americas 2015: Paperworks, international juried exhibition, juror: James Ehlers, Northwest Art Center, Harnett Hall Gallery, Minot State University, Minot, North Dakota Huntsville Evenings
- 2014 Baltimore Clayworks Solo Show, Baltimore Clayworks, Baltimore, Maryland Half Moving Memories
- 2014 Americas 2014: Paperworks, Minot State University, Minot, North Dakota Stay Team Stay
- 2014 Print Austin 2014, "The Contemporary Print", Huntsville Evenings
- 2013 Funding thru Kickstarter, Memory Diaries Environmental Sculpture
- 2013 Artlink 33rd National Print Exhibition, Female Portrait with Bottom Writing
- 2013 28th Annual International Exhibition, Department of Art and Art History, University of Texas at Tyler, Two Heads Pressing
- 2012 Americas 2012: Paperworks, Minot State University, Minot, North Dakota Female Portrait with Bottom Writing
- 2012 Americas 2012: Paperworks, Minot State University, Male Portrait with Red Background
- 2011 Americas 2011: Paperworks, Minot State University, What Does It Mean to Be Dead
- 2011 Americas 2011: Paperworks, Minot State University, Male Portrait with Sun
- 2011 Solo Exhibition: Brookhaven College Art Department,
