= Erik Laubscher =

South African artist (1927-2013)

- Born: 1927; Tulbagh, South Africa
- Died: March 22, 2012 (aged 84–85)
- Education: Continental School of Art; Maurice van Essche; John Minton (London); Claude Venard and Fernand Léger (Paris)
- Known for: Modernist landscapes and abstract works
- Style: Painting
- Movement: Modernism; South African contemporary art
- Spouse: Claude Bouscharain
- Awards: Cape Arts Medal (1972) * S.A. Akademie vir Wetenskap en Kuns Besondere Erepenning vir Skilderkuns (1990) * Cape Tercentenary Foundation Award (1994) * Molteno Medal for lifetime achievements in the Fine Arts (2012)

Erik Laubscher (1927, Tulbagh, South Africa - 22 March 2013) was a South African artist.

== Career ==
Born Erik Frederik Bester Howard Laubscher in Tulbagh, he grew up in Port Elizabeth. After showing an interest in art, he began his studies at the Continental School of Art in 1946. Laubscher trained under Maurice van Essche from 1946 – 1947 before studying further in London and Paris under John Minton, Claude Venard and Fernand Léger respectively. He was awarded a Carnegie Study Grant to the US in 1966. In South Africa, he was awarded the Cape Arts Medal in 1972, the S.A. Akademie vir Wetenskap en Kuns - Besondere Erepenning vir Skilderkuns in 1990, and The Cape Tercentenary Foundation Award for Outstanding contributions to the Visual arts in 1994. He founded the Ruth Prowse School of Art in 1970 and retired as its principal at the end of 1995. He was married to the artist Claude Bouscharain who he met at the Académie Montmartre in 1950. In 2012 he received the Molteno Medal for lifetime achievements in the Fine Arts.
