= Egon Guenther =

South African art pioneer

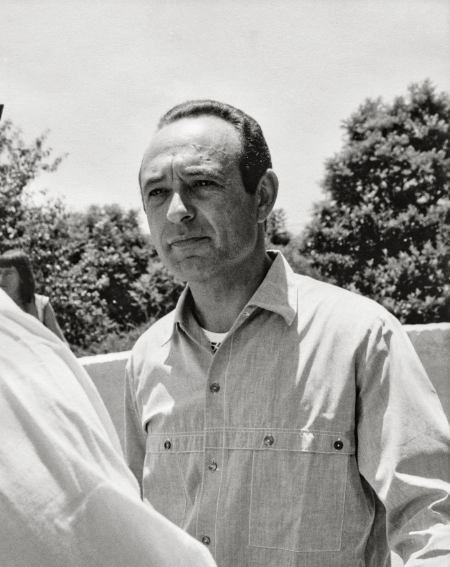
- Born: Egon Ferdinand Guenther (originally Günther); 24 January 1921; Mannheim, Germany
- Died: 30 January 2015 (aged 94); Johannesburg, South Africa
- Known for: Print Making, Photography, Gallerist
- Spouse: Hannelore Ingeborg Schmitt (1922–2011)

Egon Guenther (1921–2015) was a South African gallery owner, art teacher, print-maker, art photographer and collector. He had an influence on the development of South African art, notably the artists Giuseppe Cattaneo, Peter Haden, Hannes Harrs, Sydney Kumalo, Ezrom Legae, Cecil Skotnes, and Edoardo Villa. Guenther died on 30 January 2015 at the age of 94.

== Early life ==
Egon Ferdinand Guenther (originally Günther) was born on 24 January 1921 in Mannheim, Germany. He started out as a goldsmith, following his jeweler parents Jakob Nikolaus Günther (1889–1949) and Hermine Sommer (1881–1928).

In the late 1940s he opened an art gallery, Galerie Egon Günther, in Mannheim. This was the first German gallery to be listed after World War II in Gazette des Beaux-Arts, the leading French bulletin of arts, published in Paris. The gallery specialized in African art, and abstract and surrealist German art.

In 1947 he married Hannelore Ingeborg Schmitt (1922–2011) and they had three children: Miriam, Nico and Thomas.

== German exhibitions ==
The first exhibition opened on 1 February 1947 and was a showcase of paintings by German artists renowned at the time; it included:

- Max Ackerman (1887–1975)
- Willi Baumeister (1889–1955)
- Rudi Baerwind (1910–1982)
- Karl Kunz (1905–1971)
- Otto Ritschl (1885–1976).

In 1948 he staged an exhibition of German, Austrian and Swiss expressionists:

- Alexander Archipenko (1887–1964)
- Ernst Barlach (1870–1938)
- Max Beckmann (1884–1950)
- Heinrich Campendonk (1889–1957)
- Otto Dix (1891–1969)
- Lyonel Feininger (1871–1956)
- George Grosz (1893–1959)
- Erich Heckel (1883–1970)
- Karl Hofer (1878–1955)
- Ernst Kirchner (1880–1938)
- Paul Klee (1879–1940)
- Oskar Kokoschka (1886–1980)
- Wilhelm Lehmbruck (1881–1980)
- August Macke (1887–1914)
- Franz Marc (1880–1916)
- Otto Mueller (1874–1930)
- Emil Nolde (1867–1956)
- Max Pechstein (1881–1955)
- Christian Rohlfs (1849–1938)
- Karl Schmidt-Rottluff (1884–1976)

His final exhibition in Germany took place in December 1950.

== Moving to South Africa ==
In 1951, Guenther moved to Johannesburg, South Africa. He was described as saying "I never left Germany, I came home to Africa". In 1955, he opened a goldsmith's studio with Edy Caveng, a partnership which continued until Caveng returned to Switzerland in 1965. In 1969 Guenther sold his jewelry workshop to Kurt Donau, a Swiss immigrant, who had worked for him from 1958 to 1961.

== Egon Guenther Gallery ==
In 1957, he established the Egon Guenther Gallery in Connaught Mansions, at 215 Bree Street (now Lilian Ngoyi Street), Johannesburg. Of the exhibitions held here, the most notable were:

- Walter Battiss (1906–1982) in May 1961;
- Jacobus Hendrik Pierneef (1886–1957) in June 1961
- Sydney Kumalo, his first solo exhibition in May 1962
- Cecil Skotnes, in June 1962 and February 1963
- Edoardo Villa, in March 1963
- Maggie Laubser (1886–1973) in September 1963.

In 1963, Guenther brought together a group of South African artists: Guiseppe Cattaneo, Sydney Kumalo, Cecily Sash, Cecil Skotnes and Edoardo Villa. They adopted the name 'Amadlozi' translated as 'spirit of our ancestors'. The Amadlozi Group toured Italy in 1963 and 1964 and disbanded in 1965.

He moved his gallery in August 1965 to his house in Krans Street, Linksfield, Johannesburg. This new gallery formed part of his home that he designed with the Johannesburg architect Donald Turgel (1922–1999). At his new gallery in Linksfield the most notable exhibitions were:

- Ezrom Legae, first solo exhibition in August 1966
- Cattaneo, Harrs, Legae, Skotnes and Villa, in January 1967
- Hannes Harrs, in July 1967, November 1969 and March 1973
- Edoardo Villa, in September 1967 and October 1970
- Cecil Skotnes and Haden, in November 1969
- Sydney Kumalo, in December 1972
- Kumalo and Legae, in April 1973

From 1960 to 1976 Guenther held over 50 exhibitions at his Connaught Mansions and Linksfield galleries.

== Print-maker ==
Guenther was a print-maker, using letterpress and woodblock printing. He published several woodblock series.

- Man's Gold, Stephen Gray, 28 woodcuts by Cecil Skotnes, 1978.
- The Hunter, Olive Schreiner, 12 metal engravings by Wendy Vincent, 1979.
- The Rooinek, by Herman Charles Bosman, one woodcut and 14 wood engravings by Cecil Skotnes, 1981.

== Photographer ==
Guenther was also an art photographer (a skill learnt as a young man in Germany), and he was hand-picked by Edoardo Villa to photograph his sculptures for inclusion in books, magazines, and exhibition catalogs. Similarly, Guenther took many of the photographs of the works of the other artists that he represented, for art magazines and newspaper articles.
