= Kendell Geers =

South African artist (born 1968)

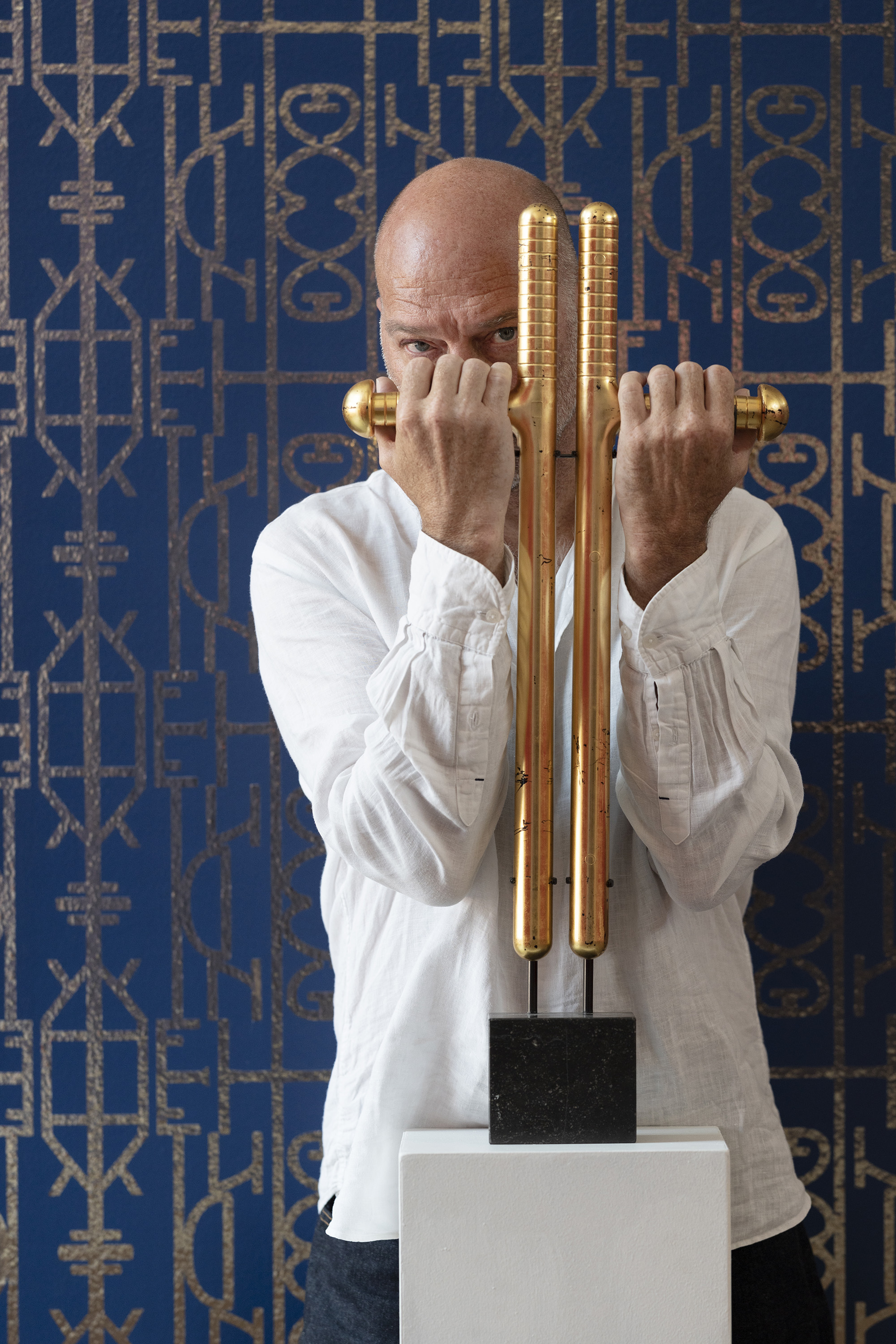
- Kendell Geers with one of his contemporary art pieces.
- Born: Jacobus Hermanus Pieters Geers; May 1968 (age 58); Johannesburg, South Africa
- Education: Wits, Johannesburg
- Occupation: Artist
- Known for: Conceptual art, Installation art Contemporary African art, African art

Kendell Geers (born May 1968) is a South African conceptual artist.

== Biography ==
Kendell Geers was born in Leondale, a working-class suburb on the East Rand outside Johannesburg, South Africa. Geers applied to the University of the Witwatersrand in Johannesburg to avoid conscription into the South African Defence Force.

At art school, Geers and Neil Goedhals formed the performance art group KOOS with Marcel van Heerden, Gys de Villiers, Megan Kruskal, and Velile Nxazonke. KOOS sang post-punk / industrial music ballads based on Afrikaans protest poetry by poets such as Ryk Hattingh and Christopher van Wyk. KOOS disbanded in 1990 following the suicide of Neil Goedhals on 16 August 1990.

His first artwork created upon his return to South Africa was titled "Bloody Hell". It was a performance piece in which he ritually washed his white Afrikaner Boer body with his own blood, in acknowledgement of his own family's role in the colonization of South Africa.

In a political act challenging his Afrikaans family and Boer culture, Geers changed his date of birth to May 1968. By doing so, he symbolically rejected his Afrikaner political identity and baptised himself as the artist Kendell Geers. The act of washing his skin in his blood was a reference to the line "My head is bloody, but unbowed" from the poem Invictus. Whilst incarcerated on Robben Island, Nelson Mandela recited this poem to other prisoners.

Shortly after his return from exile, Albie Sachs wrote a seminal essay called "Preparing Ourselves for Freedom" in which he called on his fellow ANC members to desist from "saying that culture is a weapon of struggle." In response, Geers wrote an article for the Star Newspaper in which he reversed the challenge by "saying that the struggle is a weapon of culture." He wrote "All good art is political in the sense that it challenges the ideologies and cultural prejudices of both the viewer and the artist. Political art must be perceived less as a set of predictable subjects and more as a critique of social representations." Believing that there could be "No Poetry after Apartheid", Geers used the alienation he felt about his cultural heritage to create a new practice that he called "Relational Ethics" in which he used his experiences as an activist as a weapon to challenge the minimalist aesthetics of Conceptual art. In this period, he began using police batons, razor mesh, broken glass, gunshots, danger tape, and punk-style xeroxes in his art. In 1995, he created "Self Portrait," an iconic work consisting of a broken Heineken beer bottle neck with the label still attached, which reads "Imported from Holland. The Superior Quality."

In 1999 Geers took up a one-year residence at Solitude Palace in Stuttgart and then moved to Leipzig, Berlin, and Vienna, finally settling in London. After experiencing disillusionment with the art system, Geers took a 12-month sabbatical during which he did not create any artwork. He intended to spend this time reading and reflecting on art, life, and politics in search of a justification to continue making art. However, already committed to a solo exhibition curated by Nicolas Bourriaud and Jérôme Sans, he agreed to present the outcome of his year-long, research-driven sabbatical at the Palais de Tokyo. The resulting exhibition titled, "Sympathy for the Devil", consisted of a single matchstick called "The Terrorists Apprentice" installed in the empty museum. During the opening on 1 June 2002, the matchstick was vandalized but was replaced the following day

== Methodology ==
Curator Clive Kellner described the 1988–2000 period of Geers' work as political, but the artist does not like this label. Instead of declaring his beliefs, he prefers to create art that embodies moral ambiguity and invites viewers to confront their beliefs. This way, there is a dialogue and a transformation. He refers to this as TerroRealism, which he defines as "artists who had grown up in countries that had been torn apart by war, revolution, conflict, crime and genocide created work according to an entirely different set of aesthetic principles. In place of the cool, detached passive showroom aesthetics of the white cube shrine, their work was invested with a Reality Principle that sought to disrupt the viewer's pleasure more than satisfy it."

Geers uses a variety of images, objects, colors, and materials that signal danger in an attempt to examine power structures, social injustices, and establishment values. Geers also uses words to explore the power relations and coding of language the borders of semantics in communicating complex contradictory emotions and states of being. Geers creates disarmingly simple situations, like a single matchstick in an empty museum or a broken bottle of beer, but the simple reading quickly disintegrates within a complex forest of signs. He often compares his work to the scene of a crime in which the viewer must reconstruct what has happened and then try to find their connection to that understanding.

The working process is defined by risk and experiment, and yes sometimes I have glorious failures, but sometimes what remains is something like the scene of a crime, both attractive and repulsive, and the viewer is the detective that must put all the pieces together and decode my intentions.

Most of Geers' artwork showcases visceral, raw emotion where words fail. He tries to "create pieces in which viewers have to accept responsibility for their presence in the work of art. They are always free to walk away or move on, but if they decide to engage with work, then the process becomes an active one." Geers' works create a physical presence and are about performing a specific effect rather than depicting it.

Geers centres his work around the limits of experiences like ecstasy, fear, desire, love, beauty, sexuality, violence, and death because he believes that these extreme experiences are beyond our ability to express in words. The knowledge, fear, and theories of these experiences are central to most cultures worldwide. He is drawn to the taboos that govern our lives because they are beyond our ability to control, no matter who we presume ourselves to be: rich, poor, illiterate, or educated.

=== Lost object ===
Lost object is an art historical term coined by Geers to set apart his practice of using existing objects, images or materials. The term is a protest against the term found object popularized by Marcel Duchamp. The play on words contrasting lost with found is a semantic strategy often used by the artist.

According to Columbia University Professor Z. S. Strother, "He rightfully rejects the use of the term found object since it grants megalomaniac power to the last person in a chain of hands contributing to a work's biography: 'I prefer the concept of the LOST OBJECT because it suggests that there is a history and a context to the object, image or thing BEFORE it is reduced to a work of art."

In his 1996 essay "The Perversity of my Birth, the Birth of my Perversity", the artist wrote that "Modernism was built upon precisely the same essentialist Christian philosophies and beliefs as Colonialism" and that "In rejecting Colonialism and its protégé Apartheid, I thus have no option but to also reject every element of its ideological and hegemonic machinery including its morality, art and the culture" and so, therefore, the concept of found object is rejected as flawed in a moral association with Colonialism.

Geers compares the Modernist concept of the found object with the Colonial act of "DISCOVERING" a country, or a continent, that effectively erases centuries of history by disregarding the indigenous people who live there. By the very same logic, Duchamp's act of finding erases the history, ownership, provenance, use, value, and context of an object, whereas the designation "Lost Object" implies all former histories and context in the spirit of Guy Debord's concept of Détournement.

The Lost Object releases the work of art from the Artist's ego with an open-source participation in the history of the design, manufacture, use, ownership, and function of the object through symbolic upcycling. Geers argues that the found object cannot exist outside of the quarantine of a White Cube Gallery, so Duchamp transformed the gallery into an aesthetic zone comparable to hospitals and toilets in which every form of reality is purged like the contaminant of a virus."

== Body of work ==
=== Early work ===
His early work was influenced by the ideas expressed in his response to Albie Sachs and the idea that "The Struggle is a Weapon of Art." Strongly influenced by the ideas of Léopold Sédar Senghor, Geers used his experiences as an anti-apartheid activist to interrogate the reading of conceptual art from an Afro-Centric perspective. Writing about African Conceptualism for the groundbreaking exhibition Global Conceptualism: points of origin, 1950s-1980s at Queens Museum, Okwui Enwezor wrote "In African art, two things are constantly in operation: the work and the idea of the work. These are not autonomous systems. One needs the other and vice versa. A paraphrase of an Igbo idea will clarify this relationship: where there is something standing which can be seen, there is something else standing next to it that cannot be seen but which accompanies the object. In its material basis, African art is object-bound, but in its meaning and intention it is paradoxically anti-object and anti-perceptual, bound by the many ways of conveying ideas whereby speech or oral communication are highly valued".

Geers' art is an activity located not inside the solitude of the studio but in the rough and tumble world of actions, of political, social, and cultural engagement in what he called a dialogue between art and life. His early work was marked by political violence and the violence of politics. He weaponised art by charging conceptual aesthetics with the ethics of political structures of control that explored the moral and ethical contradictions of the apartheid. He developed a visual vocabulary characterized by provocation using refined black humour that upcycled charged materials like concrete, security fencing, danger tape, broken glass shards, police batons, handcuffs, profanity, and pornography into works of art. By appropriating historical events and ideas, he focused on questions of the relationship between individuals and society. It was in this context that Geers joined every political party in the period before South Africa's first democratic elections, from the extreme right-wing to the Communist Party. In this way, he expressed his doubts about the fetishization of party politics.

He invented the system of calling his work "Title Withheld" to politically shift the convention of calling art "Untitled." "Title Withheld (Refuse)" was a 1993 sculpture that consisted of black refuse bags in which the political verb to refuse was transformed into aesthetic garbage (refuse). The 1995 work "Title Withheld (Boycott)" was a room in the Johannesburg Art Gallery designed by Colonial architect Sir Edwin Lutyens that had been emptied of its apartheid collection and the bare room exhibited in the spirit of "The Void" by Yves Klein. "With this attack on the institution (and by extension, some of his fellow artists), Geers asserted that art could refuse and resist the ideology of museological practice. Thus, the seemingly empty room questioned the pervasive modernist hunger for market-oriented postcolonial objects. As an amplification of this debate, Title Withheld (Boycott) returns us to the museum vault, to its ethnographic storage rooms and holding docks, where art and cultural objects await dispersal into the myriad networks of institutional recontextualization. It is precisely what has been cleared and evacuated from the gallery's walls that is the subject of this intensely aware intervention."

He was one of 27 artists to represent South Africa at the 1993 Venice Biennale curated by Achille Bonito Oliva, the first time since the 1968 anti-Apartheid boycotts that South African artists had been invited. Whilst in Venice, he rose to Infamy as the first artist to urinate in Marcel Duchamp's Fountain.

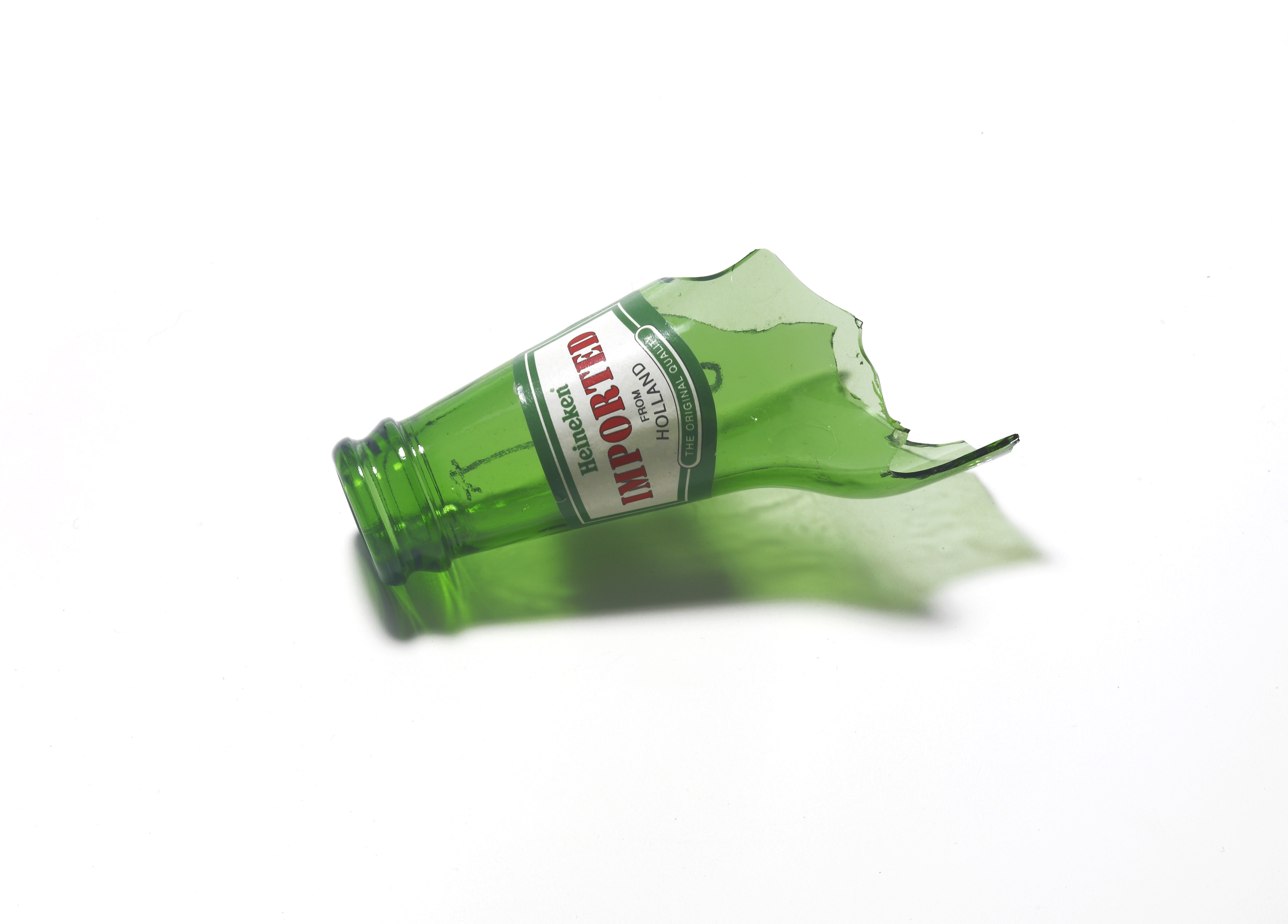
Kendell Geers "Self Portrait" 1995 - Edition of 12 (Original destroyed on TWA Flight 800)

=== Self Portrait ===
"Self Portrait" is an iconic work created in 1995 that consists of no more than a broken Heineken beer bottleneck. The label remains attached to the broken glass and reads "Imported from Holland. The Superior Quality." Geers believes that every object is more than the sum of its physical parts and is instead the embodiment of an ideology, and a portrait both of its maker and its consumer. The broken bottle of Dutch beer represents the values and morality of the Boers, convinced that apartheid was a legitimate political system. In rejecting his ancestors and their totalitarian ideologies, Geers symbolically breaks open the beer bottle to set himself free. Like his ancestors, the Boers, Heineken beer was imported into South Africa. The work was exhibited in New York in an exhibition called "Simunye' ('We Are One')" in 1996. It happened to be in the cargo hold of TWA Flight 800 that exploded at the take-off on 17 July 1996, so Geers transformed the unique original into an edition of 12, comparing himself to two six-packs of beer. Geers describes the work, saying: "Many people think that I chose Heineken because I actually like beer and more than that, drink Heineken and I have to correct them. Identity is very complex, especially if you are a White African, and self-loathing is part of your cultural inheritance. In 1990, when Mandela was released and Apartheid de-legislated, our identity as South Africans was up for grabs. Our history, culture, morality, faith, values, and everything that one might normally take for granted, as "identity" was in my case illegitimate. As an African, I consider myself an animist and respect my ancestors, but those ancestors are Dutch. The broken bottle of beer speaks of identity as violence, the self as broken, the spirit the bottle once contained has been drunk and all that remains is the garbage of history." Holland Cotter's The New York Times review said "Every now and then, political art delivers the kind of epiphany it's supposed to: the one-liner idea that sends out unexpected ripples. Such is the case with a piece by the South African artist Kendell Geers in this stimulating show. He simply places an art book caption for Marcel Duchamp's Conceptual joke 'Air of Paris' beside a news photo of police administering oxygen to a victim of a terrorist attack. In the face of this simple reality check, Duchamp's academic gamesmanship collapses into irrelevancy."

=== Later work ===
Following his year-long sabbatical in 2001/2002 his work increasingly took on a spiritual dimension influenced by alchemy, Kabbalah, Esoterism, Animism, tarot and tantra, whilst maintaining his commitment to activism. He would later define this evolution as AniMystikAktivist. The shift has been misinterpreted by some as a more poetic phase. Here, Geers transferred his incendiary practice into a post-colonial and increasingly global context, suggesting more universal themes like terrorism, spirituality, and mortality. As such, the artist's life and work can constitute a living archive composed of political events, photographs, letters, and literary texts that serve as a source of inspiration and represent a continuation of his oeuvre.

== Selected work in public collections ==
- "Brick" 1988, Johannesburg Art Gallery, Johannesburg, South Africa
- "Hanging Piece" 1993, Zeitz Museum of Contemporary Art Africa, Cape Town, South Africa
- "T. W. Batons (Circle)" 1994, MAXXI, Rome, Italy
- "T.W. (I.N.R.I.)" 1994, Centre Pompidou, Paris, France
- "Tears for Eros" 1999, Art Institute of Chicago, Chicago, USA
- "T.W. (Scream)" 1999, Stedelijk Museum voor Actuele Kunst, Ghent, Belgium
- "NOITULOVER" 2003, Castello di Ama, Chianti, Italy
- "Akropolis Redux (The Directors Cut)" 2004, National Museum of Contemporary Art, Athens, Greece
- "Monument to the Unknown Anarchist" 2007, BPS22 Collection, Charleroi, Belgium
- "Mutus Liber 953" 2014, Museum of Contemporary Art, Antwerp, Belgium.

== Curatorial projects ==
Geers curated his first group exhibition in 1990 whilst working as a journalist for the Vrye Weekblad newspaper. The project was conceived as a newspaper exhibition in which artists were invited to create a work of art specifically for the double-page centre fold of the weekly newspaper. The exhibition was published on 14 December 1990.

In 1992 Geers curated "A.I.D.S. The Exhibition" at the Johannesburg ICA inviting 17 artists under the age of 30 to respond to the AIDS pandemic. Artists included Iaan Waldeck, C. J. Morkel, Wayne Barker, Belinda Blignaut, Joachim Schönfeldt, Mallory de Cock, Julie Wajs, and Diana Victor.

Between 1993 and 1999 Geers worked as the curator and art consultant for Gencor, which was later bought out by BHP. The collection focused on artists and works of art that were central to the Anti-Apartheid Movement spirit, dating from historical artists like Gladys Mgudlandlu, Gerard Sekoto, Walter Battiss, Robert Hodgins, Ezrom Legae, and Durant Sihlali to contemporaries like Sam Nhlengethwa, William Kentridge, and Penny Siopis. He would later write an introduction essay to the book "Contemporary South African Art: The Gencor Collection" discussing the collection in the context of the end of Apartheid.

In 1995, Geers resigned from the curatorial committee of the first Johannesburg Biennale to make an application to curate his exhibition. His choice of the title "Volatile Colonies" was an amalgamation of the two main themes "Volatile Alliances" and "Decolonising our Minds". The exhibition positioned itself in opposition to the curatorial concept of Magiciens de la terre on which the Biennial was based. The artists, which included Janine Antoni, Hany Armanious, Carlos Capelán, Ilya and Emilia Kabakov, Philippe Parreno, Paul Ramirez Jonas, and Rirkrit Tiravanija, were selected "by their experiences and relationships with the languages of art rather than by their ethnicity. Although able to survive in the centre, they are always aware of their intrinsic differences about that position. No longer content to be tolerated as victims, they are seizing control of their lives and art by setting trends rather than following. Their ethnic origins and experiences are transformed from an initial disadvantage into a weapon against the languages of art."

== Social sculptures ==
Strongly influenced by the Social sculpture concept of Joseph Beuys and the African art principle of African Art as Philosophy based on the ideas of Leopold Senghor, Geers' conception of art evolved with the logic of an expanded field. On 25 April 2003, he launched RED SNIPER, a performance art music collaboration with Front 242 musician Patrick Codenys. The project attempted to find a hybrid space between image and music, working from video clips that were looped, remixed and composed simultaneously.

In 2009 whilst preparing the work "Stripped Bare" for his exhibition "A Guest Plus a Host = A Ghost", Geers was struck by the violent beauty of the lead bullets as they opened up like flowers when they hit the glass. He cast one of the exploded bullets into 18kt yellow gold earrings for Elisabetta Cipriani Wearable Art and called the social sculpture "Within Earshot".

== Manifesto ==
In 2011, during the preparations for a retrospective that would begin at the South African National Gallery and travel to Haus der Kunst, Geers fell out with the curators. He fell into "a deep depression at the time brought about by the injustices of an art system that cares only about market ranking and price tags. The art system has no use or value for vision, integrity or consequence." For a second time in his life, he found himself unable to be creative, so instead of making art he decided to use his time in search of a reason to justify being an artist. He began a list of reasons that eventually evolved into a manifesto. In trying to come to terms with the illegitimacy of his identity as a working-class Afrikaans white man, Geers authored the Political-Erotical-Mystical Manifesto, bringing together his early political activism with a spiritual consciousness.

== Exhibitions ==
Kendell Geers has participated in many international exhibitions and biennials including the Johannesburg Biennale (1995, 1997), Havana Biennale (1994), Istanbul Biennale (2003), Taipei Biennale (2000), Lyon Biennale (2005), Venice Biennale (1993, 2007, 2011, 2017, 2019), Dakar Biennial (2018), Shanghai Biennale (2016), São Paulo Biennial (2010), Carnegie International (1999), and Documenta (2002 and 2017). His first retrospective exhibition was called "Irrespektiv" and toured in 2007 from BPS22 (Charleroi, Belgium) to SMAK (Gent, Belgium), BALTIC Centre for Contemporary Art (Newcastle), Musée d'art contemporain de Lyon (Lyon, France), DA2 Domus Artium (Salamanca, Spain) and MART (Trento, Italy). The second retrospective was organised by Okwui Enwezor in 2013 at the Haus der Kunst (Munich, Germany).

== Bibliography ==
- "Argot," Chalkham Hill Press, 1993. ISBN 0-620-19048-5.
- "Contemporary South African Art," Jonathan Ball Publishers, 1997. ISBN 978-1-86842-039-1.
- "My Tongue in Your Cheek," Dijon: les Presses du réel; Paris: Réunion des musées nationaux, 2002. ISBN 2-7118-4374-2.
- "The Plague is Me," Artist Book, One Star Press, France 2003, Limited Edition of 250 copies
- Kendell Geers. Mondadori Electa, 2004. ISBN 88-370-3050-9.
- "Kendell Geers; The Forest of Suicides." published by MACRO, Museo D'Arte Contemporanea, Roma, 2004. ISBN 883-7-03050-9.
- "Point Blank," Artist Book, Imschoot Uitgevers, Belgium, 2004 limited edition of 1000 copies ISBN 9077362126
- "Fingered" Imschoot Uitgevers, 2006. ISBN 90-77362-33-9.
- "Irrespektiv." BOM / Actar, 2007. ISBN 978-84-934879-5-9.
- "Be Contemporary #07" Edited by Kendell Geers, Be Contemporary Publishers, France, ISBN 978-2-91863-000-5
- "Kendell Geers 1988–2012." Edited by Clive Kellner, Prestel, 2012. ISBN 978-3791353005
- "Hand Grenades From My Heart". Edited by Jerome Sans, Blue Kingfisher, Hong Kong, 2012. ISBN 978-988-15064-7-4
- "Aluta Continua," Edited by Kendell Geers, ArtAfrica Magazine March 2017
- "AniMystikAKtivist: Between Traditional and the Contemporary in African Art". Essays by Jens Hoffmann and Z.S. Strother, Mercatorfonds and Yale University Press, 2018, ISBN 9780300233230
- "IncarNations: African Art as Philosophy," Edited by Kendell Geers, Silvana Editoriale Italy, 2019, ISBN 8836642993
- "OrnAmenTum'EtKriMen," Danillo Eccher, M77 Gallery, Milano, 2020
