= Port Quin =

Hamlet in Cornwall, England

Coordinates: 50.5890°N 4.8673°W

Port Quin: Cornish: Porthgwynn
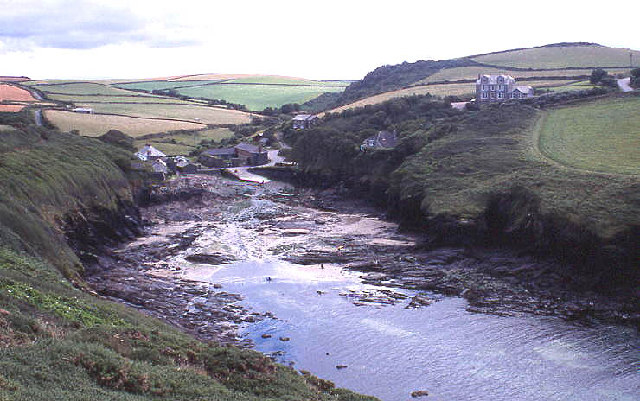
- Port Quin, viewed from the South West Coast Path from Kellan Head

- Location within Cornwall
- OS grid reference: SW971805
- Civil parish: St Endellion
- Unitary authority: Cornwall
- Ceremonial county: Cornwall
- Region: South West
- Country: England
- Sovereign state: United Kingdom
- Post town: PORT ISAAC
- Postcode district: PL29
- Dialling code: 01208
- Police: Devon and Cornwall
- Fire: Cornwall
- Ambulance: South Western
- UK Parliament: North Cornwall

Port Quin (Cornish: Porthgwynn, meaning white cove) (Note: The cove is sited at grid reference SW971805.) is a small cove and hamlet between Port Isaac and Polzeath, in north Cornwall, England.

== Geography ==
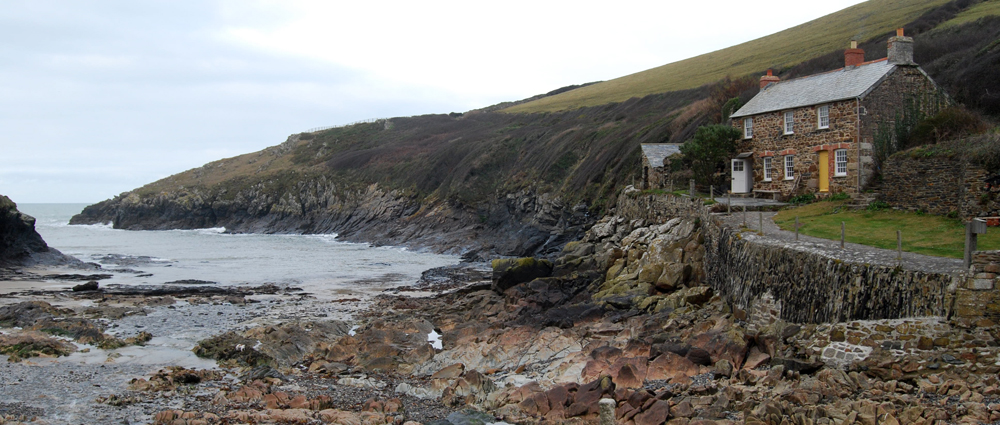
Port Quin from the shore

Facing the Atlantic Ocean, the narrow rocky inlet of Port Quin provides a naturally sheltered harbour for sea-going vessels. The cove gives its name to Port Quin Bay, a 2.5 mi (4.0 km) stretch of coast that extends from Kellan Head to The Rumps.

Port Quin lies within the Cornwall National Landscape, formerly Cornwall Area of Outstanding Natural Beauty (AONB). Almost a third of Cornwall has AONB designation, with the same status and protection as a National Park.

== History ==
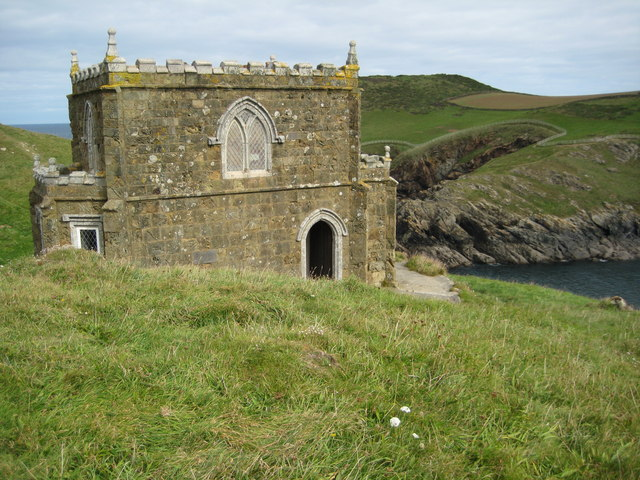
Doyden Castle

The name of the hamlet is believed to come from the Cornish words "porth" (cove, harbour) and "gwynn" (white). Its earliest mention is when Laurence de Porquin took his name from the village in 1327.

During the medieval period, boats from Port Quin often sailed to Wales, trading coal, manure, antimony, lead and building ashlar. The cove was from where granite from Lundy Island - used to build the tower of the parish church at St Endellion - was unloaded. The local economy was based primarily upon the pilchard season that operated from August to December. Fresh catches were pressed in several large sheds in the village before the separated fish oil and flesh were transported for sale. Farming and small mines were also important sources of revenue.

The size of the remaining fish cellars indicates that Port Quin was once a prosperous village. But by 1841 it was entering decline, a census recorded it had a population of 94 people and 23 houses. The community was slowly moving to neighbouring villages because of poor pilchard and herring seasons and the closure of local mines. Many emigrated (via Padstow) to Canada. As Port Quin dwindled to the size of a hamlet, its demise gave rise to the local legend of disaster at sea. There are several variations on the legend, each focussing on the men being drowned at sea. One version states that one Sunday - breaking the Sabbath - all the men of village put to sea but were lost in a great storm that destroyed the entire fishing fleet. A different source describes how all of the men were out in a single fishing vessel but omits the storm.

In February 1700, the East India ship Thornton was wrecked at Port Quin.

On the south-west side of the inlet is Doyden Point, on which is situated Doyden Castle, a castellated folly built about 1830 by a Samuel Symons, a late Regency bon viveur from Wadebridge.

In the 1841 census, there were 23 households reported as living in Port Quin.

There are two old mines in the immediate area around Port Quin. Port Quin Mine worked a small lode of Antimony with an adit about 400m upstream from the beach and two shafts further up the slope. Gilson's Cove Mine was located on the cliff tops beyond Doyden and worked a lode producing lead ore, the far end of which can be seen in the cliffs at Reedy Cliff north-east of Port Quin.

=== Present day ===
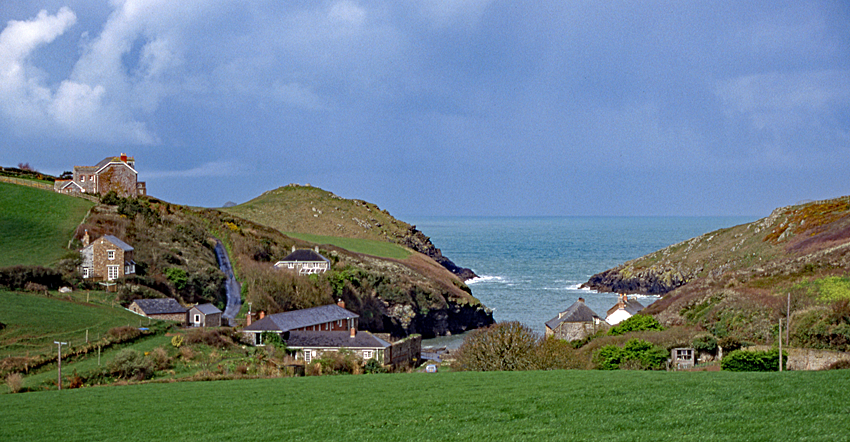
Port Quin surrounded by farms

The harbour is surrounded by three local farms Roscarrock, Trevigo and Scarrabine all run by local families. Part of Port Quin and a few small fields around the hamlet are owned by the National Trust; the Trust rents out several of the stone cottages as self-catering holiday accommodation. The South West Coast Path closely follows the coastline of the inlet. Port Quin is popular with walkers and kayakers and there is a small car park, which during the Summer season has a small mobile vintage cafe, on the lane which leads from Port Quin to the village of Trelights. There is a sea kayaking company based in the harbour called Cornish Coast adventures that runs tours between Easter and October and explores the old antimony mines and the local coastline.

== Television ==
Various locations around Port Quin were used in the 1970s by the BBC for filming an adaptation of Winston Graham's Poldark novels. Quin House in Port Quin was used in the first series and Doyden Folly was portrayed as a gatehouse. Roscarrock and its environs were also widely used. In the following decade another adaptation of a classic novel based in Cornwall, Jamaica Inn, also included filming at Doyden Folly.

In 2011, Doyden Castle was used as Pentire Castle in the ITV series Doc Martin.

== See also ==
- Wadebridge
- Pentire Point
- The Rumps
- Roscarrock
