= For the Fallen =

1914 poem by Laurence Binyon

- by Laurence Binyon
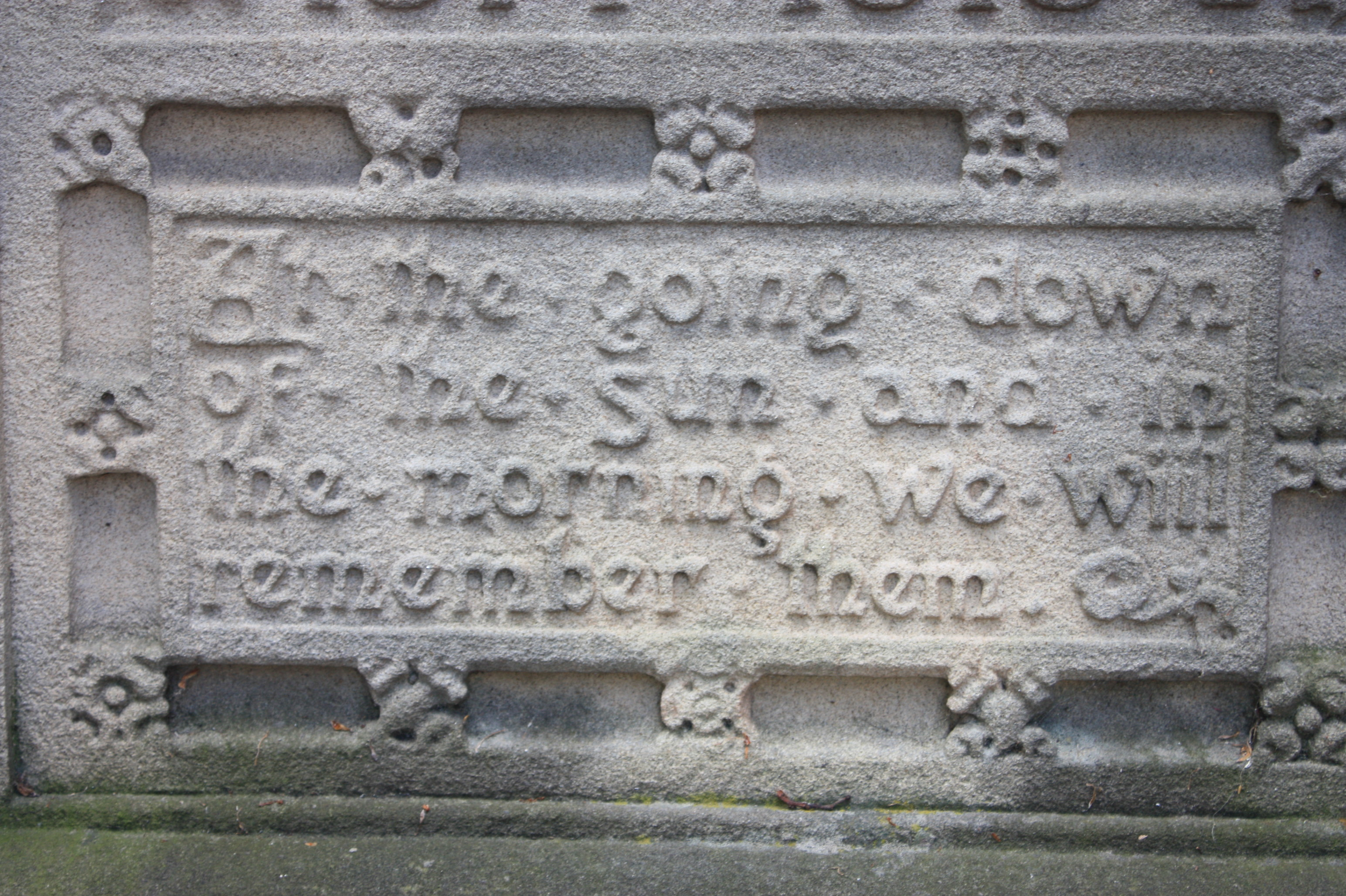
- "For the Fallen" inscription on the Stirling War Memorial in Scotland
- First published in: The Times
- Country: United Kingdom and the commonwealth
- Subject(s): Remembrance Day, war
- Publication date: 21 September 1914

Full text
- The Times/1914/Arts/For the Fallen at Wikisource

"For the Fallen" is a poem written by Laurence Binyon. It was first published in The Times in September 1914. It was also published in Binyon's book "The Winnowing Fan : Poems On The Great War" by Elkin Mathews, London, 1914.

Over time, the third and fourth stanzas of the poem (usually now just the fourth) have been claimed as a tribute to all casualties of war, regardless of state. This selection of the poem is often taken as an ode that is often recited at Remembrance Day and ANZAC Day services, and is what the term "Ode of Remembrance" usually refers to.

== Background ==
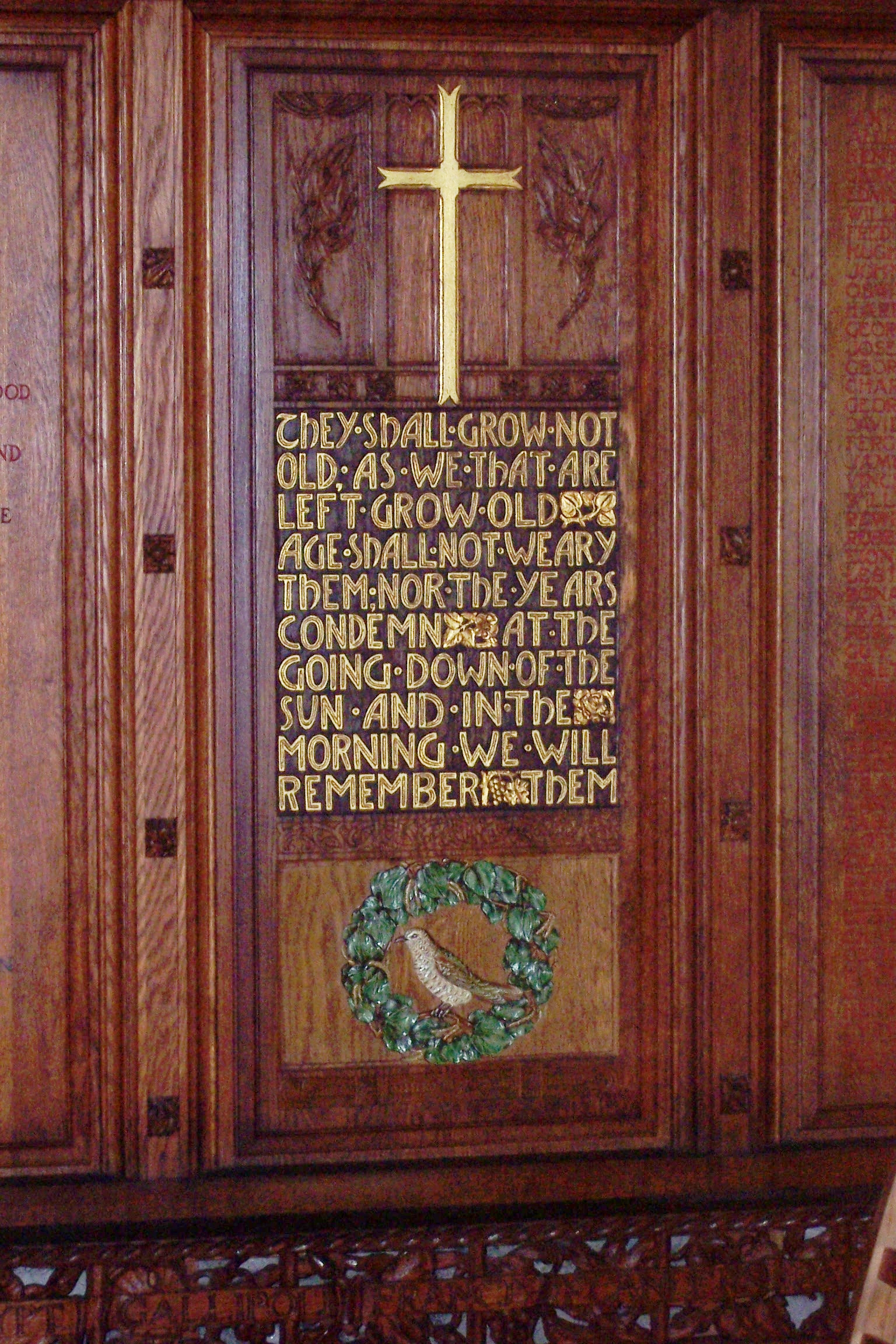
War memorial in ChristChurch Cathedral, Christchurch, New Zealand

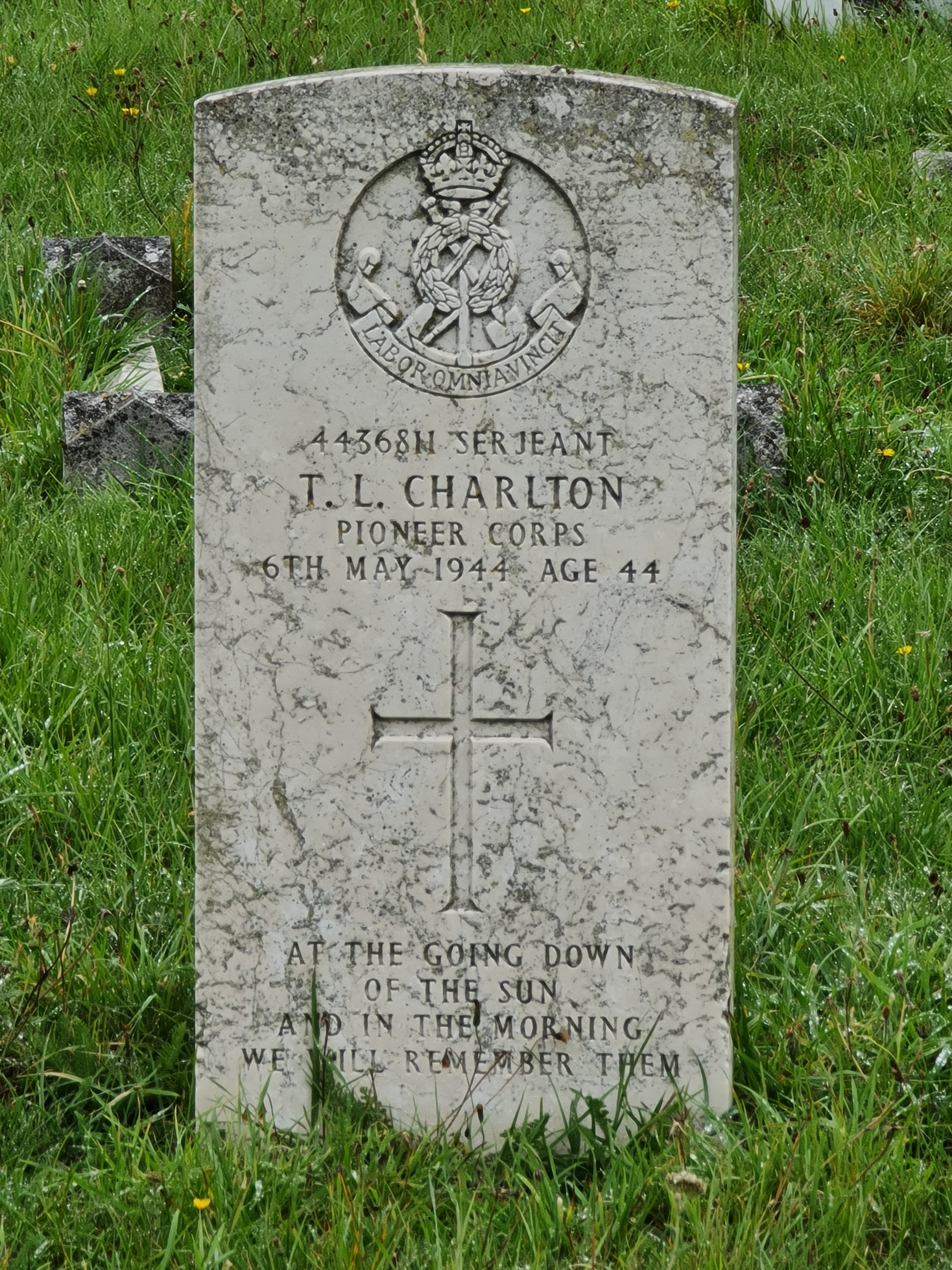
CWGC headstone with excerpt from "For The Fallen"

Laurence Binyon (10 August 1869 – 10 March 1943), a British poet, was described as having a "sober" response to the outbreak of World War I, in contrast to the euphoria many others felt (although he signed the "Author's Declaration" that defended British involvement in the war, appearing in The New York Times on 18 September with 54 other British authors—including Thomas Hardy, Arthur Conan Doyle, and H.G. Wells). A week after the war began in 1914, Binyon published his first war poem, "The Fourth of August" in The Times.

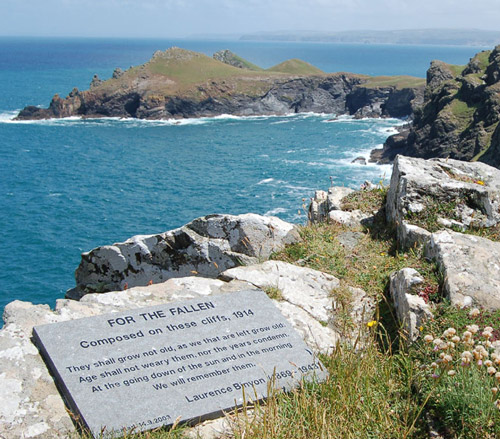
"For The Fallen" plaque with The Rumps promontory beyond

=== Writing ===
On 23 August, in Britain's opening action of World War I on the Western Front, the British Expeditionary Force (BEF) suffered a loss at the Battle of Mons and the subsequent lengthy retreat. The extent of fighting to follow was not revealed as casualties were comparable to past European wars. "For the Fallen" was specifically composed in honour of the casualties of the BEF, written immediately following the retreat from the Battle of Mons.

Binyon composed the original poem while sitting on the cliffs between Pentire Point and The Rumps in north Cornwall, UK. A stone plaque was erected at the spot in 2001 to commemorate the fact. The plaque bears the inscription:

For the Fallen
Composed on these cliffs 1914

There is also a plaque on the East Cliff above Portreath in central North Cornwall which cites that as the place where Binyon composed the poem. It was published in The Times on 21 September 1914, just seven weeks after the beginning of the war.

== Poem ==
With proud thanksgiving, a mother for her children,
England mourns for her dead across the sea.
Flesh of her flesh they were, spirit of her spirit,
Fallen in the cause of the free. (1–4)

Solemn the drums thrill; Death august and royal
Sings sorrow up into immortal spheres,
There is music in the midst of desolation
And a glory that shines upon our tears. (5–8)

They went with songs to the battle, they were young,
Straight of limb, true of eye, steady and aglow.
They were staunch to the end against odds uncounted:
They fell with their faces to the foe. (9–12)

They shall grow not old, as we that are left grow old:
Age shall not weary them, nor the years condemn.
At the going down of the sun and in the morning
We will remember them. (13–16)

They mingle not with their laughing comrades again;
They sit no more at familiar tables of home;
They have no lot in our labour of the day-time;
They sleep beyond England's foam. (17–20)

But where our desires are and our hopes profound,
Felt as a well-spring that is hidden from sight,
To the innermost heart of their own land they are known
As the stars are known to the Night; (21–24)

As the stars that shall be bright when we are dust,
Moving in marches upon the heavenly plain;
As the stars that are starry in the time of our darkness,
To the end, to the end, they remain. (25–28)

=== Analysis ===
The first stanza establishes a patriotic element. Binyon personifies the United Kingdom as a "mother," and British soldiers as its "children." The poem remembers the deaths of soldiers while justifying the cause of their deaths as "the cause of the free": a theme carried throughout the rest of the poem.

The monosyllabic words of the second stanza echo "solemn, funereal drums." The stanza, like the first, espouses themes of "martial glorification." It describes war as "solemn," with a "music" and "glory" and compares death to "celestial music".

The third stanza refers to soldiers marching to fight in the Battle of the Marne. It is less known than the fourth, despite occasionally being recited on Remembrance Day. The soldiers are "straight of limb, true of eye, steady and aglow," and though facing "odds uncounted" are "staunch to the end".

The fourth stanza of the poem was written first, and includes the best known lines in the poem. The original words "grow not old" are sometimes quoted as "not grow old." It has also been suggested that the word "condemn" should be "contemn," however "condemn" was used when the poem was first printed in The Times on 21 September 1914, and later in the anthology The Winnowing Fan: Poems of the Great War in 1914. If either publication had contained a misprint, Binyon had the chance to make an amendment. The issue has arisen in Australia, with little or no debate in other Commonwealth countries that mark Remembrance Day. The line commencing "Age shall not weary them" echoes (probably unconsciously) Enobarbus' description of Cleopatra in Antony and Cleopatra: "Age cannot wither her, nor custom stale".

In the fifth stanza, Binyon speaks of loss and mourns the deaths of soldiers who left behind "familiar tables" and "laughing comrades." In the sixth stanza, the soldiers are described as achieving a sort of "bodily transcendence" in their death. Finally, the seventh stanza compares dead soldiers to stars and constellations, that remain traces of being soldiers, moving in "marches". This memorialises the dead while keeping their role as soldiers for the British Empire present; "an empire that, by association with these eternal soldiers, makes its own claims on a sort of immortality. "

== Critical response ==
In his biography on Laurence Binyon, John Hatcher noted:

In its gravitas, its tenderness, and depth of grief, "For the Fallen" looks as if it should have appeared in The Times of 21 September 1918 not 1914. It harmonizes with the tone neither of The Times war reports nor of other poems appearing at the time... While other early Great War poems sounded hollow when the true scale and nature of the war slowly permeated the national consciousness, this poem grew in stature with each defeat, each abortive push, and pyrrhic victory.

Hatcher concludes that "by 1918 it was an infinitely better poem than it had been in 1914." The British Library said the poem "remains one of the most affecting and well-known elegies from the period."

== Usage ==
=== Memorial services and monuments ===
The "Ode of Remembrance" is regularly recited at memorial services held on days commemorating the First World War, such as ANZAC Day, Remembrance Day, and Remembrance Sunday. Recitations of the "Ode of Remembrance" are often followed by a playing of the "Last Post".

==== UK/Europe ====
The ode is also read at the Menin Gate, every evening at 8 p.m., after the first part of the "Last Post". It is mostly read by a British serviceman. The recital is followed by a minute of silence. The Ode is also read by the members of the HMS Hood Association at the end of every annual commemorative service held on 24 May each year, the anniversary of the sinking of HMS Hood.

In 2018, at the centennial of the signing of the Armistice, plans were made to ring carillons and church bells across the Commonwealth at local sundown, in reference to the line, "at the going down of the sun... we will remember them." The bells were to be rung 100 times in recognition of the 100 years having passed.

A plaque on a statue dedicated to the fallen in La Valletta, Malta, is also inscribed with these words.

==== Oceania ====
In Australia's Returned and Services Leagues, and in New Zealand's Returned Services Associations, it is read out nightly at 6 p.m., followed by a minute's silence. It is also part of the Dawn Service in Australia and New Zealand. Like the Menin Gate, the Australian War Memorial incorporates the ode into its Last Post Ceremony, where it is read by a member of the Australian Defence Force (ADF) and is followed by a minute of silence and a bugler playing the "Last Post".

===== Ode of Remembrance =====
Typically, the "Ode of Remembrance" is recited in Australia, New Zealand and the Pacific Islands as follows:

English original

They shall grow not old,
As we who are left grow old.
Age shall not weary them,
Nor the years condemn.
At the going down of the sun
And in the morning,
We will remember them.

Māori translation

E kore rātou e kaumātuatia
Pēnei i a tātou kua mahue nei
E kore hoki rātou e ngoikore
Ahakoa pehea i ngā āhuatanga o te wā
I te hekenga atu o te rā
Tae noa ki te arangamai i te ata
Ka maumahara tonu tātou ki a rātou
Ka maumahara tonu tātou ki a rātou

New Zealanders echo the last line "We will remember them" whereas Australians typically respond both the last line and then with "Lest We Forget".

==== Canada ====
In Canadian remembrance services, a French translation is often used along with or instead of the English ode.

A quotation appears on the Calgary Soldiers' Memorial and on the cenotaph in Grandview Park, Vancouver, British Columbia.

==== Malaysia ====
A memorial in Teluk Intan commemorating the fallen of both the First and Second World Wars, which was installed during the colonial period in British-ruled Malaya, includes a few lines from the poem.

==== "Lest we forget" ====
The line "Lest we forget", taken from Rudyard Kipling's poem "Recessional" (which incidentally has nothing to do with remembering the fallen in war), is often added as if were part of the ode and repeated in response by those listening, especially in Australia. Several Boer War memorials are inscribed with the phrase, showing its use pre-World War I. In the United Kingdom, New Zealand and Singapore, the final line of the ode, "We will remember them", is repeated in response. In Australia people respond with "We will remember them" followed by "Lest we forget". In Canada, the second stanza of the above extract has become known as the Act of Remembrance, and the final line is also repeated.

=== Musical settings ===
Sir Edward Elgar set to music three of Binyon's poems ("The Fourth of August", "To Women", and "For the Fallen", published within the collection The Winnowing Fan) as The Spirit of England, Op. 80, for tenor or soprano solo, chorus, and orchestra (1917). His setting of "For the Fallen" sparked some controversy as it was published after another setting of the same poem by the composer Cyril Rootham in 1915. Neither composer was responsible for this, and Elgar initially offered to withdraw but was persuaded to continue by the literary and art critic Sidney Colvin and by Binyon himself. There is an eighth stanza in the version that was set to music by Elgar. An abridged version of Elgar's setting of "For the Fallen", called "With Proud Thanksgiving", was sung at the unveiling of the new Cenotaph in Whitehall on 11 November 1920.

"They shall grow not old..." was set to music by Douglas Guest in 1971, and has become a well-known feature of choral services on Remembrance Sunday. Nottingham-based composer Alex Patterson also wrote a setting of the text in 2010. The text of "For the Fallen" has also been set by Mark Blatchly for treble voices, organ and trumpet (which plays "The Last Post" in the background). In March 2015, a new musical setting was released by Gil Orms.

=== Popular culture ===
- The title of the novel Time of our Darkness, by South African author Stephen Gray, is a reference to the last two lines of the poem: "As the stars that are starry in the time of our darkness, / To the end, to the end, they remain."
- Paul Bearer recited part of the poem as a tribute to wrestler Owen Hart on 24 May 1999 at the Raw is Owen memorial, the night after he died in the ring.
- The CD audiobook Artists Rifles (2004) includes a reading of "For the Fallen" by Binyon himself. The recording itself is undated and appeared on a 78-rpm disc issued in Japan. Other Great War poets heard on the CD include Siegfried Sassoon, Edmund Blunden, Robert Graves, David Jones, and Edgell Rickword.
- The song "Berliners", from Roy Harper's 1990 album Once, uses the 4th stanza as its opening verse, preceded by a recording of a Remembrance Day ceremony where the same stanza was recited.
- "...For Victory", a song from the eponymous album by British death metal band Bolt Thrower, contains a quote from Binyon's poem.
- In the closing scene of the Doctor Who episode titled "The Family of Blood", the vicar at a Remembrance Day ceremony reads "For the Fallen/Ode of Remembrance" to those who have gathered, including elderly survivors of the war.
- The title of Peter Jackson's film They Shall Not Grow Old, produced to commemorate the 100th anniversary of Armistice Day in 2018, perpetuates the common misquotation of Binyon's "They shall grow not old."

== Bibliography ==
- Hatcher, John (1995). "For the Fallen". Laurence Binyon: Poet, Scholar of East and West. Oxford UP. pp. 188–211. ISBN 9780198122968.
- Moffett, Alex (2007). ""We Will Remember Them": The Poetic Rewritings of Lutyens' Cenotaph 1" (PDF). War, Literature & the Arts. 12: 228–246. Archived from the original (PDF) on 2 February 2019.
- Moore, Jerrold N. (1984). Edward Elgar: a Creative Life. Oxford: Oxford University Press. ISBN 0-19-315447-1.
