= Pentire Head =

Headland on the coast of North Cornwall, England

Pentire Head Penn Tir (Cornish)
- Headland
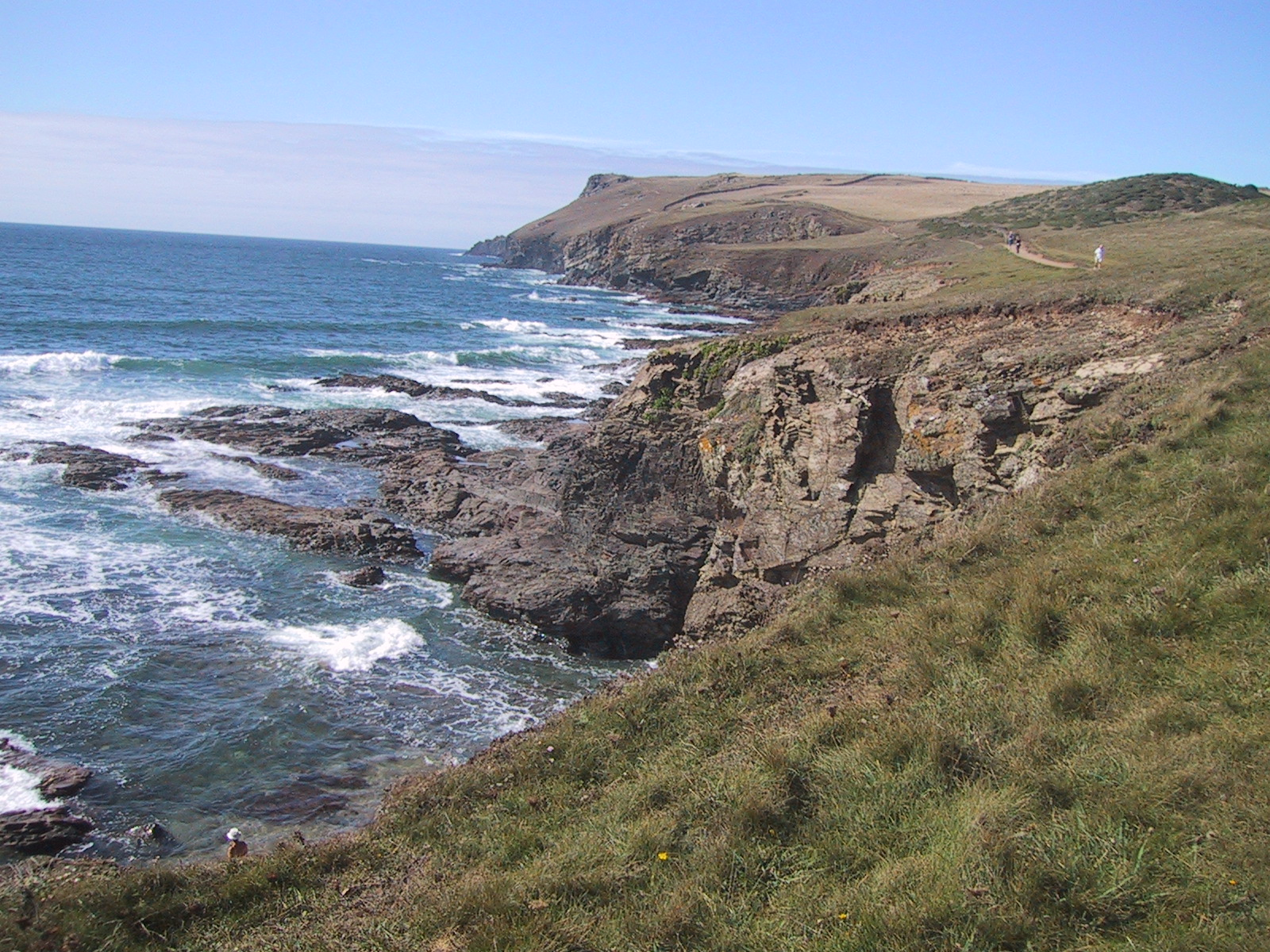
- View of Pentire Point taken from Polzeath

- Location within Cornwall
- Coordinates: 50.584°N 4.919°W
- Grid position: SW934802
- Location: Cornwall

Pentire Head (Cornish: Penn Tir, lit. 'headland') is a headland and peninsula on the Atlantic coast in North Cornwall, England, and is about one mile square. The headland projects north-west with Pentire Point at its north-west corner and The Rumps promontory at its north-east corner.

== Etymology ==
The origin of the name is from Cornish penn (head) and tir (land): another headland with the name Pentire is further west near Crantock.

== Geography ==
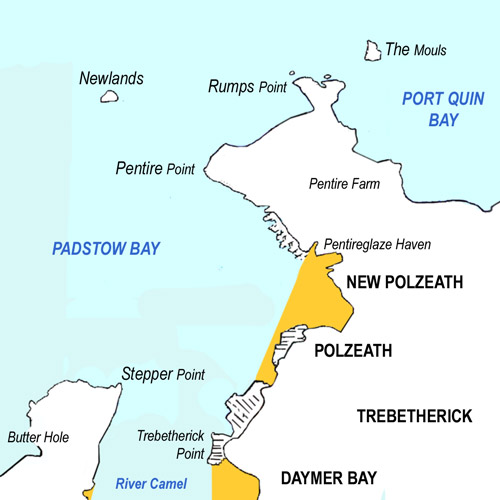
Sketch map showing Pentire Head and the surrounding area

Pentire Point and Stepper Point stand at either side of the mouth of the River Camel estuary (Pentire to the north-east, Stepper to the south-west). To the south of Pentire Point is the small seaside resort of Polzeath. The coastline around the headland is owned by the National Trust, although the bulk of the headland itself is let to Pentire Farm.

The entire headland forms the Pentire Peninsula Site of Special Scientific Interest, designated for its geology and flora and fauna including nationally rare plants. Important examples noted include slates from the Upper Devonian period, several invertebrate species, predatory birds and grey seals. Pentire Head is formed of pillow lavas, while The Rumps consists of altered dolerite, and naturally occurring Prehnite has also been found on the cliffs. Other valuable minerals can be found and two mines have operated on the headland over the years. Pentire mine was the first in the locality having started around 1580 mining for lead ore, four shafts of at least 66 fathoms (396 ft; 121 m) and an adit being driven into the lode. In the mid 19th century another mine referred to as Pentireglaze mine worked an extension of the lode, and also drove 2 shafts into a nearby lode bearing both lead and silver ores, this extending the workings out beyond the headland under the sea, where miners reported hearing ships passing overhead. To achieve this an engine house was erected on the cliff top but production by the grandly named Pentire Glaze and Pentire United Silver-Lead Mines ceased in 1857 after several years with no output. Sources are not always consistent between the names of the two mines, but from the mid 19th Century the headland produced over 1000 tons of lead ore and 19,000 ounces (540 kg) of silver. After production ceased the engine house, at Engine Shaft, gradually became a ruin and was finally demolished around 1957, with the site, and associated waste dumps (contaminated with material brought in from another mine dump), now being a National Trust car park known as the Lead Mines car park.

A small island named Newland, but sometimes referred to as Puffin Island, lies about one mile (1,600 metres) to the north-west of Pentire Point. Another small island named The Mouls lies 300 yards to the north-east of The Rumps and supports colonies of seabirds. Beyond The Rumps, the coastline veers southeast into Port Quin Bay.

The South West Coast Path closely follows the coastline of the headland, and sightseeing boat tours regularly travel along the coast from the nearby port of Padstow.

== History ==
On The Rumps is an Iron Age cliff castle dating back to the second century BC. The site was first recorded in 1584 when it was referred to as Pentire Forte, and was excavated by the Cornwall Archaeological Society between 1963 and 1967. Today the fort itself can be identified by the three ramparts crossing the narrower strip of land linking the Rumps headland to the main part of Pentire Head. It is thought that the various ramparts have different dates and may have exploited existing features in their construction, while excavation indicates that there were three phases of building and two phases of occupation with hut platforms and domestic debris having been found along with evidence of a pallisade and a timber gate. The castle is listed on the English Heritage at risk register as it is in danger of being lost to erosion. The state of the site was described as declining in 2019.

== "For The Fallen" ==
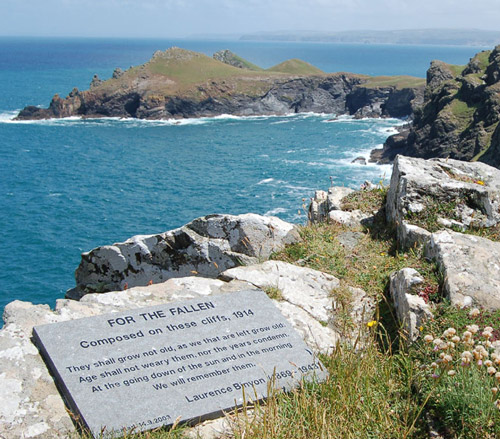
The plaque commemorating Laurence Binyon with The Rumps promontory beyond

The poet Laurence Binyon wrote "For the Fallen" (first published in The Times in September 1914) while sitting by the cliffs between Pentire Point and The Rumps. A stone plaque was erected in 2001 to commemorate the fact and bears the inscription

FOR THE FALLEN
Composed on these cliffs 1914

The plaque also bears the fourth stanza of the poem:

They shall grow not old, as we that are left grow old
Age shall not weary them, nor the years condemn
At the going down of the sun and in the morning
We will remember them

== Gallery of images ==
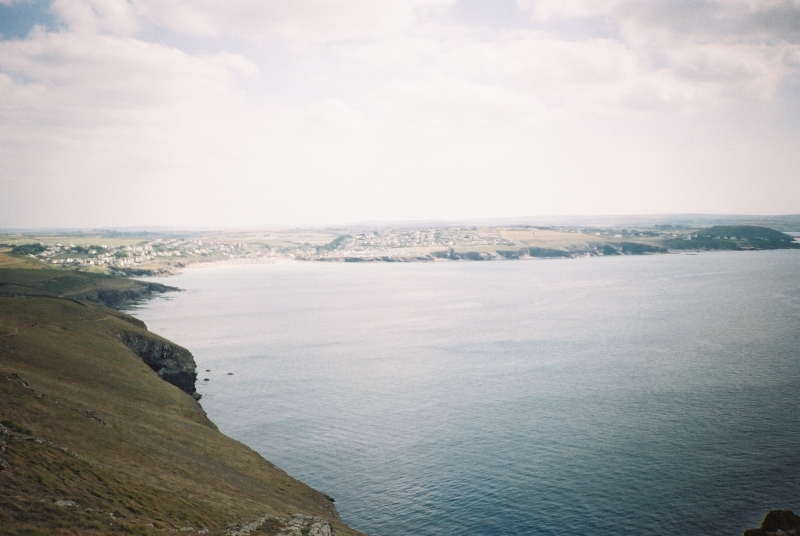
The view from Pentire Point, looking towards Polzeath and Trebetherick Point.

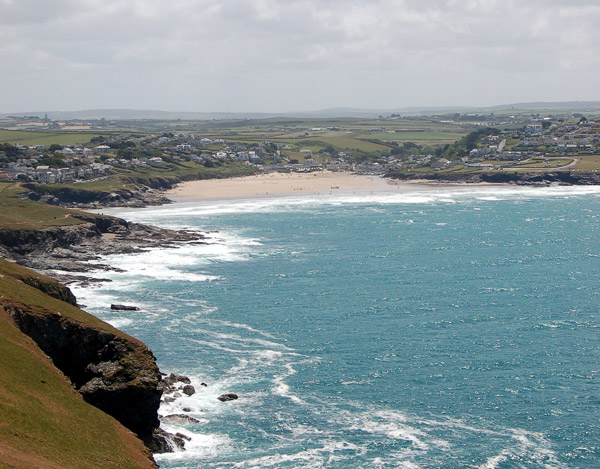
Another view of Polzeath from Pentire Point.

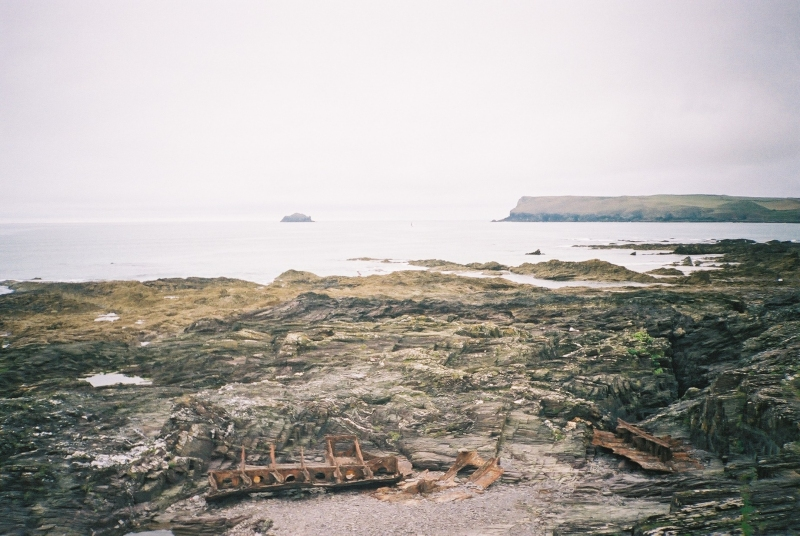
Pentire Point and Puffin island.

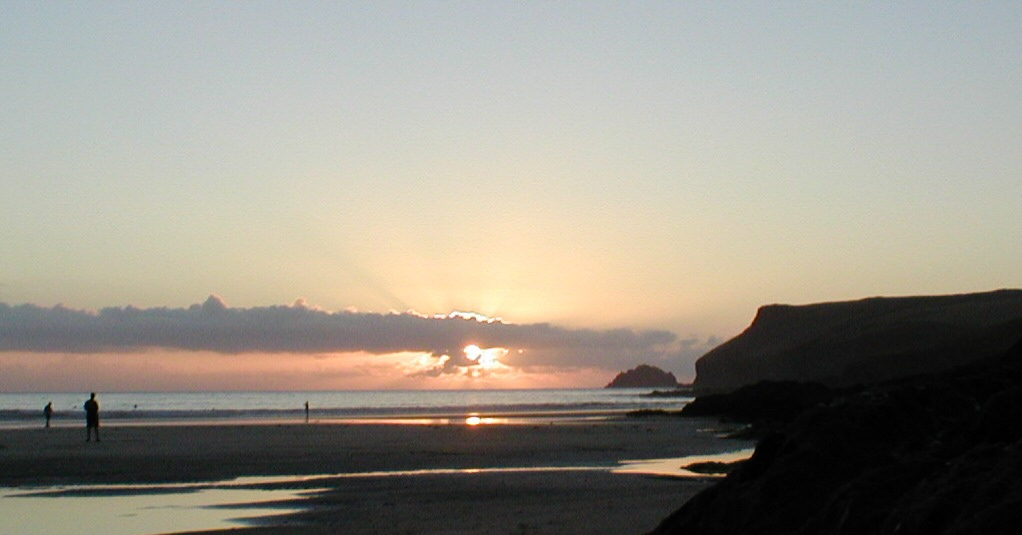
Puffin island and Pentire Point at sunset.

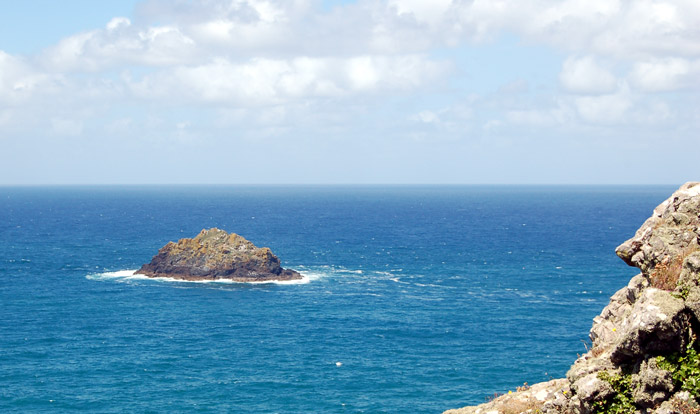
Puffin island seen from Pentire Point.

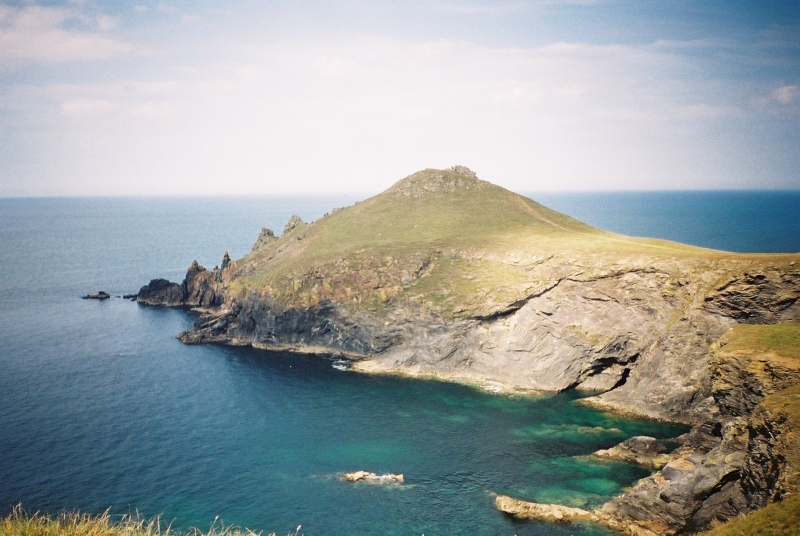
The Rumps, site of Iron Age cliff fortifications.

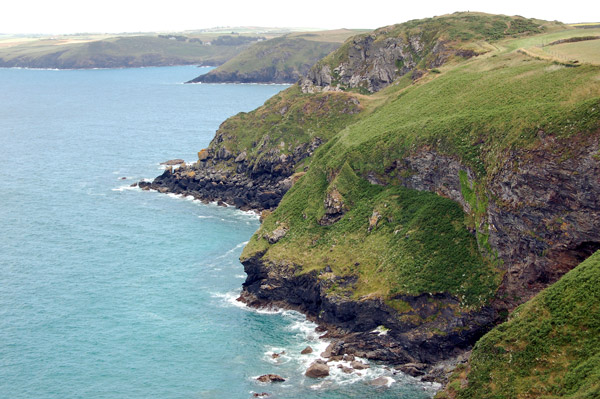
Looking across Port Quin Bay from the east side of Pentire Head.

== See also ==
- They Shall Not Grow Old (2018 documentary film)
