= Sydney Kumalo =

South African artist (1935–1988)

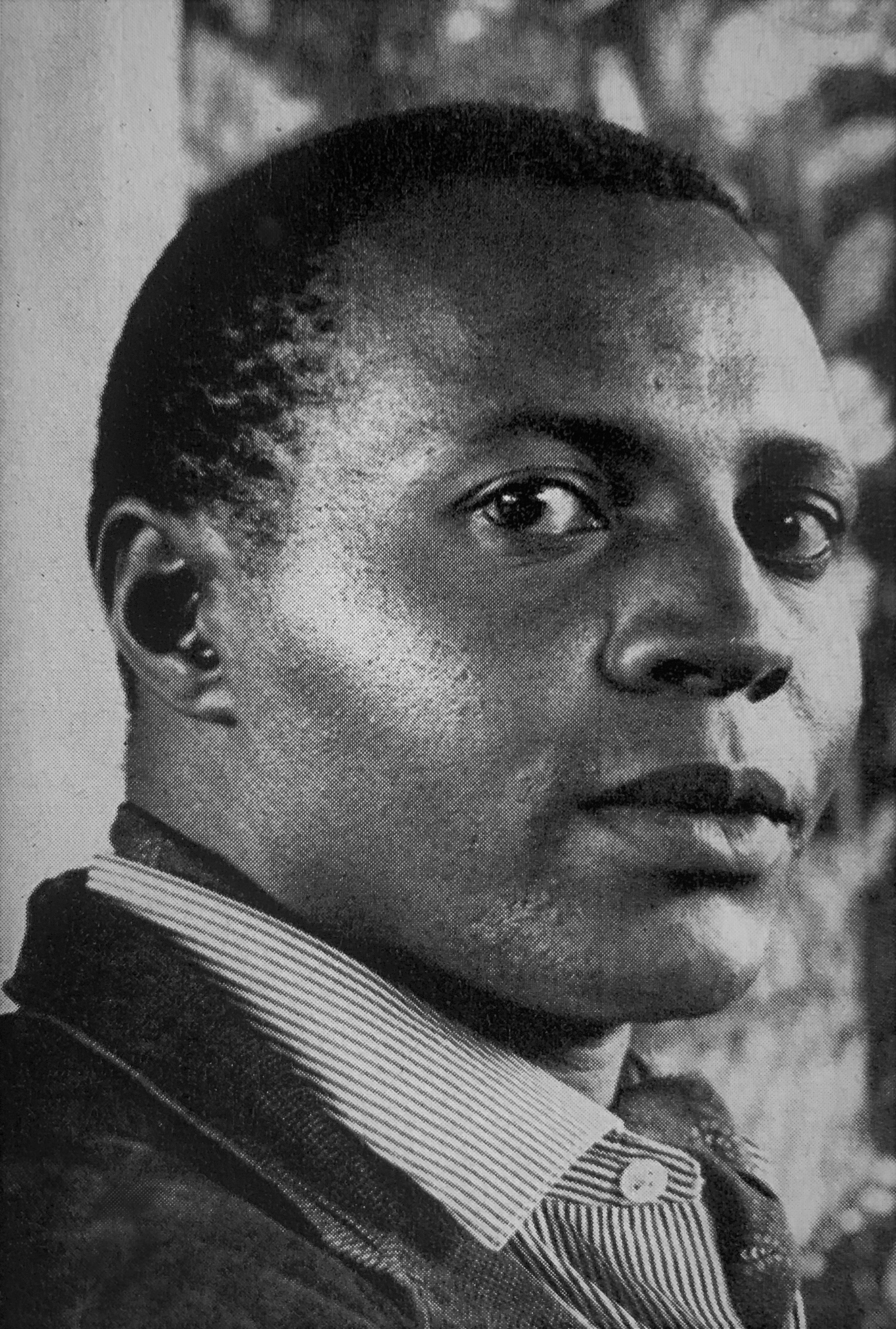
- Born: Sydney Alex Kumalo; 13 April 1935; Sophiatown, South Africa
- Died: 11 December 1988 (aged 53); Johannesburg, South Africa
- Education: Polly Street Art Centre
- Notable work: Praying Woman; St Francis; The Listener; Seated Woman: 1959, 1960, 1962, 1965; Blind Girl, Head E.G, Head Big Ears (Elongated), Head Matriarch, Squat Head, Head; Two Bulls; Lying Woman; Girl with Bird; Madala 1, 2, 3, 4, 5, 6, 7; High Shoulders; Pregnant Woman II, Horse; Mourning Woman; Little Dancer, Squatting Woman, Leaning Head on Arm, Hugging Nude, Reclining Figure.
- Movement: African Modernism
- Patrons: Egon Guenther
- Website: https://www.kumalo-legae.org/

Sydney Alex Kumalo (1935–1988) was a South African sculptor. Together with Anton van Wouw, Edoardo Villa and Ezrom Legae he is regarded as one of South Africa's best sculptors. He sculpted in clay, terracotta, and Plaster of Paris. Most of his sculptures were cast in bronze by the Renzo Vignali foundry in Pretoria.

== Early life ==
Sydney Alex Kumalo was born on 13 April 1935 in Sophiatown, Johannesburg and raised in a Zulu family. He attended Madibane High School in Soweto, South Africa. He enrolled as a student of Cecil Skotnes at the Polly Street Art Centre in 1952 . He attended the art centre, working alongside Cecil Skotnes as a teacher, until 1957, when he was appointed as his assistant. In 1957, Skotnes and his students were commissioned to decorate the ceilings of the new Church of St Peter Claver in Seisoville, Kroonstad. In addition to the ceiling decoration, Kumalo was asked to sculpt the Stations of the Cross and to produce sculptures of Christ and Mary. These were Kumalo's first attempts at sculpture.

== Art education ==
Most of his art training came from the Polly Street Art Centre. There he received guidance from Cecil Skotnes and Egon Guenther. In 1958, Kumalo studied with Edoardo Villa, a leading South African sculptor, for 2 years. He also worked as an assistant to Skotnes. Working with Villa had a great influence on Kumalo's style and form of expression. He helped to implement modernism with an African background into Kumalo's work. When the Polly Street Art Centre relocated to the Jubilee Social Centre in Eloff Street, Johannesburg in 1960, it was renamed the Jubilee Art Centre and Kumalo took over from Skotnes as the senior art instructor. He held the post from 1960 to 1964. When Kumalo retired from his teaching post at the Jubilee Art Centre in 1964, Ezrom Legae replaced him, first as an assistant and then as co-director of the Centre.

He was part of the Amadlozi Group founded in 1963, which included Cecily Sash, Cecil Skotnes, Edoardo Villa, and Guiseppe Cattaneo. The name "Amadlozi" (Zulu: spirit of our ancestors) was used for a conscious appropriation of African sculptural traditions; this group had an African influence in their art and used their culture as a form of expression. Their group was promoted by Egon Guenther. Guenther influenced the group with German Expressionism and arranged exhibitions in Italy during 1963 and 1964. This would be the start of Kumalo's international career. Kumalo became a full-time artist after 1964, which in turn, had him resign from his teaching career at the Jubilee Art Centre.

From 1960 to 1972, Kumalo was represented by the influential Johannesburg gallerist Egon Guenther and from 1973 until his death by the Goodman Gallery in Johannesburg. He was also represented by the prestigious Grosvenor Gallery in London and New York in 1965 and 1966. Over the course of his career Kumalo produced 125 sculptures; 81 while represented by the Egon Guenther Gallery, 6 while represented by the Grosvenor Gallery and 38 while represented by the Goodman Gallery.

== Career ==
From 1957 to 1961, Kumalo contributed to four church commissions: the Church of St Peter Claver in Seisoville, Kroonstad, 1957; the Church of St Martin de Porres in Orlando, Johannesburg, 1958; the Church of Our Lady of the Rosary in Thabong near Welkom, 1960/1961; and the Church in Roma, Lesotho, 1961.

His work was included in multiple South African exhibitions. Kumalo's talent and promise as a sculptor came to prominence at his first public showing in 1958, followed by six exhibitions in 1960. He was the winner of the special award for the most promising up and coming artist at the Artists of Fame and Promise 1960 exhibition held by the Lawrence Adler Galleries, Johannesburg, July 1960. In May 1962 the Egon Guenther Gallery hosted Kumalo's first solo exhibition. In 1963, he won the Philip Frame Award at the Art South Africa Today exhibition at the Durban Art Gallery, given for "the most promising up and coming artist".

Kumalo's international career began in the mid 1960's. He participated in exhibitions in Europe and the United States. He was invited to multiple international events and won numerous awards. In 1967, he was invited to visit the USA and Europe as a guest of the United States/South African Leadership Exchange Programme, or the USSALEP.

In 1988 he was included in "The Neglected Tradition Exhibition" at the Johannesburg Art Gallery. In 2018, Kumalo's sculptures were exhibited at Re/discovery and Memory, the works of Kumalo, Legae, Nitegeka and Villa, Norval Foundation, Cape Town. In June 2023, Kumalo's sculptures featured in a major retrospective exhibition at Strauss & Co's offices in Johannesburg, which accompanied the launch of a Catalogue Raisonne on the sculptures of Sydney Kumalo and Ezrom Legae.

== Art style ==
Kumalo's most used medium was terracotta. The terracotta was then cast in bronze. His work showed a great amount of expressionism and contemporary aspects. It also showed ideas of symbolism and imagery. There was a large attention to detail during the molding and casting process. It's evident that he took inspiration from life in his work. The themes that he work with the most were the idea of the human, the beast, and shaping the human body into anthropomorphic forms. He work mostly reflects things such as on reincarnation, the influences of good and evil, and the influence of ancestors.

Kumalo saw the human body and the animal body to be in close relation to each other physically and spiritually. The stance of his figures mostly resemble animals. His work can be closely related to early African carvings and tribal art. They both conveyed true passion and emotion and showed the fear of evil powers over them that they had no control of. His style can also show influences from primitivism. Many of his works' facial expressions could be compared to African Tribal masks. His figures where usually disproportionate with larger features and elongated torsos. There is a sense of controlled movement, simplicity, and somewhat restraint within his work.

== Awards and accolades ==
Kumalo received many awards and accolades in acknowledgement of his talents, both in South Africa and internationally, at a time in South Africa’s history when official policies were intensely discriminatory and negatively impacted black people.

- 1960: Special Award for ‘the most promising up and coming artist’ at the Artists of Fame and Promise exhibition, Lawrence Adler Galleries, Johannesburg, July 1960 for his sculptures Praying Woman (1960) and Pregnant Young Woman (1960).
- 1963: Philip Frame Award, Art South Africa Today, Durban Art Gallery, August 1963 for his terracotta Girl with Dove (1963).
- 1966: 33rd Venice Biennale, June – October 1966, exhibited three works: Head Big Ears (Elongated) (1965), Horse (1964) and Seated Woman (1959).
- 1967: travel bursary for three months to the USA as a guest of United States/South African Leadership Exchange Program (US-SALEP), April – June 1967.
- 1967: Ninth Fundação Bienal de São Paulo, September – December 1967 sculptures exhibited: Lying Woman (1964), Madala V (1967), Tongue Out (1966) and Zulu Chief (1962).
- 1967: Bronze Medal: Fourteenth Exhibition of the Transvaal Academy, Johannesburg Art Gallery, October to November 1967 for his sculpture Madala I (1966).

== Exhibitions ==
Kumalo's sculptures were exhibited on many occasions during his lifetime and after his death in solo and group exhibitions both at leading South African galleries and at high profile galleries in the UK, Europe and the USA.

- African Artists, Polly Street Art Centre, Helen de Leeuw Gallery, Johannesburg, 1958
- Artists of Fame and Promise, Lawrence Adler Galleries, Johannesburg, 1960
- Urban African Art Exhibition, the Union Exposition incorporating the 49th Rand Easter Show, Johannesburg, 1960
- Exhibition of Non-European Paintings & Sculpture by the Polly Street Art Centre, Queens Hall Art Gallery, Johannesburg, 1960
- A Connoisseur’s Choice, Egon Guenther Gallery, Johannesburg, 1960
- An exhibition of Sculpture and drawings by Sydney Kumalo, Egon Guenther Gallery, Johannesburg, 1962
- Art South Africa Today 1963, Durban Art Gallery, 1963
- Exhibition of the Amadlozi Group at the Galleria Numero in Rome, Florence, Milan, and Venice, Italy, in 1963 and 1964.
- Eleventh Exhibition of the Transvaal Academy, Johannesburg Art Gallery, November 1964
- Fifty Years of Sculpture: Some Aspects 1914–1964. Grosvenor Gallery, London, 1965
- Exhibition of Kumalo Bronzes and Drawings, United States Information Service (USIS) Auditorium, Shakespeare House, Johannesburg,1965
- African Painters and Sculptors from Johannesburg, Piccadilly Gallery, London, 1965
- Opening of Egon Guenther’s New Private Gallery, Linksfield, Johannesburg, 1965
- South African Artists, Grosvenor Gallery, London, 1965
- 33rd Venice Biennale, Italy,1966
- Kumalo–Skotnes, Grosvenor Gallery, London,1966.
- Group Exhibition, Four Sculptors (Ayrton, Gutfreund, Kumalo, Neizvestny), Grosvenor Gallery, New York, 1966
- Ninth Sao Paulo Biennale, Brazil, 1967
- Sydney Kumalo, Bronzes and Drawings, Egon Guenther Gallery, Johannesburg, 1967
- Sydney Kumalo, Solo Exhibition of Bronzes and Drawings, South African Association of Arts Gallery, Pretoria, 1967
- Group Exhibition: Paintings and Sculpture by Hannes Harrs, Sydney Kumalo, Cecil Skotnes, Natal Society of Arts Gallery, Durban, 1967.
- Group Exhibition: sculpture·sa 1900–1967, Adler Fielding Gallery, Johannesburg, 1967
- Exhibition of the ‘Guenther Group’– Sydney Kumalo, Hannes Harrs, Ezrom Legae and Cecil Skotnes: Leader Gallery, Grahamstown,1967
- Fourteenth Exhibition of the Transvaal Academy, Johannesburg Art Gallery, 1967
- Exhibition of Busts in Sculpture, South African Arts Association Gallery, Pretoria, 1967
- Sculpture from the Human Form, Grosvenor Gallery, London, 1968
- Group Exhibition: Peter Haden, Hannes Harrs, Sydney Kumalo, Ezrom Legae, Edoardo Villa and the Unknown Masters of Africa, Egon Guenther Gallery, Johannesburg, 1968.
- Fifteenth Exhibition of the Transvaal Academy, Johannesburg City Library, 1969
- Connoisseur’s Choice, Johannesburg College of Education, 1969
- Sculpture, Grosvenor Gallery, London, 1969
- Contemporary African Art, Camden Arts Centre, London, 1969
- Sydney Kumalo Solo Exhibition, Goodman Gallery, Johannesburg, 1973
- Group Exhibition: Sydney Kumalo, Louis Maqhubela and Geoffrey Armstrong, Lidchi Gallery, Johannesburg, 1971
- Group Exhibition of Sculpture, Contemporary and Traditional African Art, Gallery International, Cape Town, 1973
- Exhibition of Zulu Culture; ‘Kultur der Zulu’, Museum of Nations, Vienna, Austria and Lille France 1974
- Sydney Kumalo Solo Exhibition, Goodman-Wolman Gallery, Cape Town, 1974
- Contemporary South African Art, National Art Gallery, Athens, Greece, 1974
- Zulu Art, Musée Royal de l’Afrique Centrale (Royal Museum for Central Africa), Tervuren, Belgium, 1975
- Sydney Kumalo Solo Exhibition, South African Association of Arts, Pretoria, 1976
- Sydney Kumalo Solo Exhibition, Goodman Gallery, Johannesburg, 1977
- Contemporary African Art in South Africa, University of Fort Hare Collection; touring exhibition, 1979
- Sydney Kumalo Solo Exhibition, Goodman Gallery, Johannesburg, 1979
- Beeldhou 80/ Sculpture 80, University of Pretoria Merensky Library, 1980
- Mixed Media Drawings and Sculptures by Sydney Kumalo, Goodman Gallery, Johannesburg, 1982
- Tributaries – A View of Contemporary South African Art, Africana Museum (Museum Africa), Johannesburg, 1985
- Image of Man: The Human Head in Modern Sculpture, South African national touring exhibition, 1984 – 1985
- Amadlozi ’85, USA, 1985
- Sydney Kumalo Solo Exhibition, Goodman Gallery, Johannesburg, 1987
- Vita Art Now, Johannesburg Art Gallery, 1988
- The Neglected Tradition: Towards a New History of South African Art (1930 - 1988), Johannesburg Art Gallery, 1989
- Art from South Africa c. 1917-c. 1980, Grosvenor Gallery, London, 1995
- Sydney Kumalo: Commemorative Exhibition of Drawings and Sculpture, Goodman Gallery, Johannesburg, 1997
- 20th Century Sculpture, Archipenko to Reddy, Grosvenor Gallery, London, 2007
- A Labour of Love–Art of South Africa, Weltkulturen Museum, Frankfurt, Germany, 2015/2016
- Re/discovery and Memory, the works of Kumalo, Legae, Nitegeka and Villa, Norval Foundation, Cape Town, 2018
- A Black Aesthetic: A View of South African Art, 1970–1990. Standard Bank Art Gallery, Johannesburg, 2019
- The Sculptures of Sydney Kumalo and Ezrom Legae, a Retrospective; Strauss & Co., Johannesburg, 2023

== Sources ==
- Nel, Karel (2018). Re/discovery and Memory: The works of Sydney Kumalo, Ezrom Legae, Serge Alain Nitegeka and Edoardo Villa. Norval Foundation. ISBN 978-0-6207-9391-9.
- Watkins, Gavin Graham; Skinner, Charles (2023). The Sculptures of Sydney Kumalo and Ezrom Legae: A Catalogue Raisonné. Strauss & Company. ISBN 978-0-6397-6015-5.
