= Louis Maqhubela =

South African artist (1939–2021)

- Born: 1939; Durban
- Died: 6 November 2021 (aged 81–82); London
- Citizenship: South Africa
- Occupation: Artist

Louis Khehla Maqhubela (1939 – 6 November 2021) was a South African artist.

== Biography ==
Louis Maqhubela was born in Durban in 1939. He studied at the Polly Street Art Centre in Johannesburg. One of his earliest exhibitions was in 1959 in Johannesburg, within Artists of Fame and Promise. He continues to exhibit, mainly in London, though his works can be found in galleries and collections in England (London), the United States of America, and South Africa. He lives in London with his wife and family. His current works can also be viewed from his personal home page.

Maqhubela died in London on 6 November 2021.

== Works ==
His early work depicted township life but developed rapidly to more abstract approaches. His work is characterized by his use of bold colours and clear references to his African heritage. He works in a variety of media from oil to gouache. Works include:

- Zebra (1962)
- Untitled
- Composition
- Pondo Forms (1996)
- Trellis (1997)
- Inyoka II (2002)

== See also ==
- Cecil Skotnes
