= Mark Blatchly =

English organist and composer

Mark Laurence James Blatchly (born 1960) is an English organist and composer.

Born in Shepton Mallet, Blatchly was an organ student at St Paul's Cathedral. He was assistant organist at Gloucester Cathedral, and between 1990-1993 was Director of Music at St Edmundsbury Cathedral. He was also a music teacher and organist at Charterhouse until his retirement in 2018.

His best known work is a setting of For the Fallen, which has been recorded by several cathedral choirs for Remembrance services.

As organist, he has been recorded both in solo roles and as part of larger ensembles.
