= Time of Our Darkness =

1988 novel by Stephen Gray

- Author: Stephen Gray
- Language: English
- Genre: Novel
- Publisher: Arrow Books
- Publication date: 1988
- Media type: Print hardback and paperback
- Pages: 328 p. (paperback edition)
- ISBN: 0-09-965670-1 (paperback edition)
- OCLC: 122308880

Time of Our Darkness is a novel by South African author Stephen Gray. It tells the story of a homosexual teacher in 1980s Apartheid South Africa and his relationships with his long-term partner and a young black boy.

== Plot summary ==
The 13-year-old Disley D. Mashanini is the sole black pupil at a white private school in Sandton Johannesberg, there on a scholarship from a township in the Transvaal. Pete Walker teaches English and sometimes Afrikaans. Peter has lived with André for ten years, though their sexual relationship has ceased.

One day, Disley turns up at Walker's house, answering Walker's questioning with "Because I wanted to see you, sir." Walker takes him home to his township in KwaThema, Gauteng.

Some days later Disley again appears at the door, this time with a note from his mother explaining about the unrest in the townships and asking him to look after the boy. André is dismissive of the boy, warning Pete in jest about what is illegal with blacks – "Specially seduction of minors. You can shoot them in the back but you can't go to bed with them".

After André leaves, Pete makes Disley have a bath and then pins some of own clothes so that they fit the skinny little boy's body. Disley is modest as he changes, but Pete is aroused: "I'd found this impromptu ceremony such an enjoyment that a furious guilt arose in me: if I prolonged this it would become more than a merciful deed, and I would be irretrievably lost". He thinks of himself, "kneading an ache over that untouchable item, a black parcel of skin and bone, under age."

André has taken to using rent boys, and returns with one called Prince. They all go off to the airport (André is a flight attendant) and go plane spotting. Disley loves it. As Pete gets ready to take Disley to the school where he can stay overnight, he discovers that Disley has deliberately left his jumper and suitcase at Pete's home. Disley also hints that he knows all about André and Pete being gay, and Pete recognises the possibility of blackmail over his teaching position. So he agrees to let Disley stay and to coach him so that he can stay on at the private school.

Pete starts wishfully thinking about what might happen after they finish watching Polanski's Macbeth on video, "Probably after that he was going to seduce me, probably I was due to have the experience of a lifetime, and be entirely lost." Pete prepares a bed roll for Disley in the corner of his bedroom, goes for a bath, and returns to find Disley has crept into his bed. Pete climbs in and starts intimately stroking the boy, who responds suggestively "You haven't given me a good-night kiss". Pete thinks "This was not a child, but a lover."

Over the next six months, Disley matures, his performance at school improves due to his one-to-one coaching and he starts making friends. But he is drawn back to his roots when a relative dies and disappears from school. Pete and another teacher Jenny set off to find him. Jenny is a radical, always followed by the police, and she seduces Pete and he finally loses his heterosexual virginity. Pete discovers she is laundering money brought into South Africa by André and the novel ends with the suffering typical of the violent world of apartheid and police corruption.

== Title source ==
The title is taken from the second last line of Laurence Binyon's poem "For the Fallen":

"As the stars are starry in the time of our darkness,
To the end, to the end, they remain."

The fourth verse is well known as the "Ode of Remembrance":

"They shall grow not old, as we that are left grow old.
Age shall not weary them, nor the years condemn.
At the going down of the sun and in the morning
We will remember them."

== See also ==
- Pedophilia
- Child sexual abuse
