= Stephen Gray (writer) =

South African writer (1941–2020)

- Born: 30 November 1941; Cape Town, Cape Province, Union of South Africa
- Died: 22 October 2020 (aged 78); Johannesburg, Gauteng, South Africa
- Occupations: Author, literary critic
- Notable work: Time of Our Darkness (1988); Beatrice Hastings: A Literary Life (2004)

Stephen Gray (30 November 1941 – 22 October 2020) was a South African writer and critic.

== Career ==
Gray was born in Cape Town on 30 November 1941. He studied at St. Andrew's College, Grahamstown, and later at the University of Cape Town, Cambridge University, England (where he received a Bachelor of Arts and a Masters of Arts, both in English), and the University of Iowa, US (where he studied a Masters of Fine Arts in creative writing). He was also awarded a D. Litt and d. Phil. by Rand Afrikaans University in Johannesburg. Until 1992, he was Professor of English at the Rand Afrikaans University in Johannesburg.

Gray was a prolific poet and published eight novels. Recurrent themes include attitudes to homosexuality and the many rewritings of history in South Africa, including examining attitudes to class and race. His literary journalism appeared in the South African weekly newspaper, the Mail & Guardian, from the 1990s to the 2010s. He also wrote for the theatre and edited collections of work by Athol Fugard and Herman Charles Bosman.

Gray died on 22 October 2020 in Johannesburg at the age of 78.

== Published works ==
[Note: Gray has been published in many countries by various publishers in other editions. Consult ISBN in WorldCat and other sources for multiple editions.]

=== Novels and short stories ===
- Local Colour. Ravan Press, 1975. ISBN 0-86975-046-1
- Visible People. R. Collings, 1977. ISBN 0-86036-046-6.
- Caltrop's Desire. Africa Book Centre, 1980. ISBN 0-86036-108-X.
- Time of Our Darkness. Arrow, 1988. ISBN 0-09-965670-1.
- Born of Man. Gay Men's Press, 1989. ISBN 0-85449-107-4.
- War Child. Serif, 1994. ISBN 1-897959-01-X.
- My Serial Killer and other Short Stories. Jacana Media, 2005. ISBN 1-77009-030-4

=== Plays ===
- Schreiner: A One-Woman Play. David Philip, 1983. ISBN 0-908396-97-X.

=== Poetry ===
- It's About Time. David Philip, 1974. ISBN 0-949968-21-8.
- Man’s Gold. Egon Guenther, 1978. With 28 woodcuts by Cecil Skotnes.
- Hottentot Venus and other Poems. David Philip, 1979.
- Love Poems: Hate Poems. Bellew Publishing, 1982. ISBN 0-86036-196-9.
- Apollo Café and Other Poems, 1982-89. David Philip, 1989. ISBN 0-86486-129-X.
- Season of Violence, Justified Press, 1992. ISBN 1-871049-87-3
- Selected Poems 1960-92, David Philip, 1994. ISBN 0-86486-238-5
- Gabriel's Exhibition, Mayibuye Books, 1998. ISBN 1-86808-378-0

=== As editor ===
- C. Louis Leipoldt. Stormwrack. David Philip, 1980. ISBN 0908396104.
- Modern South African Poetry. A. D. Donker, 1984. ISBN 0-86852-056-X.
- The Penguin Book of Southern African Stories. Penguin, 1985. ISBN 0-14-007239-X.
- The Penguin Book of Southern African Verse. Penguin, 1988. ISBN 0-14-058510-9.
- South Africa Plays: New South African Drama. Nick Hern, 1994. ISBN 1-85459-148-7.
- Charles Rawden Maclean alias John Ross. The Natal Papers of "John Ross". U of Natal P, 1996. ISBN 0-86980-851-6.

=== Other ===
- Southern African Literature: An Introduction. Barnes & Noble Imports, 1979. ISBN 0-06-492530-7.
- John Ross: The True Story. 1987.
- Human Interest and Other Pieces. Justified Press, 1993. ISBN 0-947451-23-4.
- Accident of Birth: An Autobiography. COSAW Publishing, 1993. ISBN 1-874879-23-0.
- Free-lancers and Literary Biography in South Africa. Editions Rodopi BV, 1999. ISBN 90-420-0656-0.
- Beatrice Hastings: A Literary Life. Viking-Penguin, 2004. ISBN 9780143529248.
- Life Sentence: A Biography of Herman Charles Bosman. Human & Rousseau, 2005. ISBN 0-7981-4484-X.
