= Ezrom Legae =

South African sculptor, draughtsman (1938–1999)

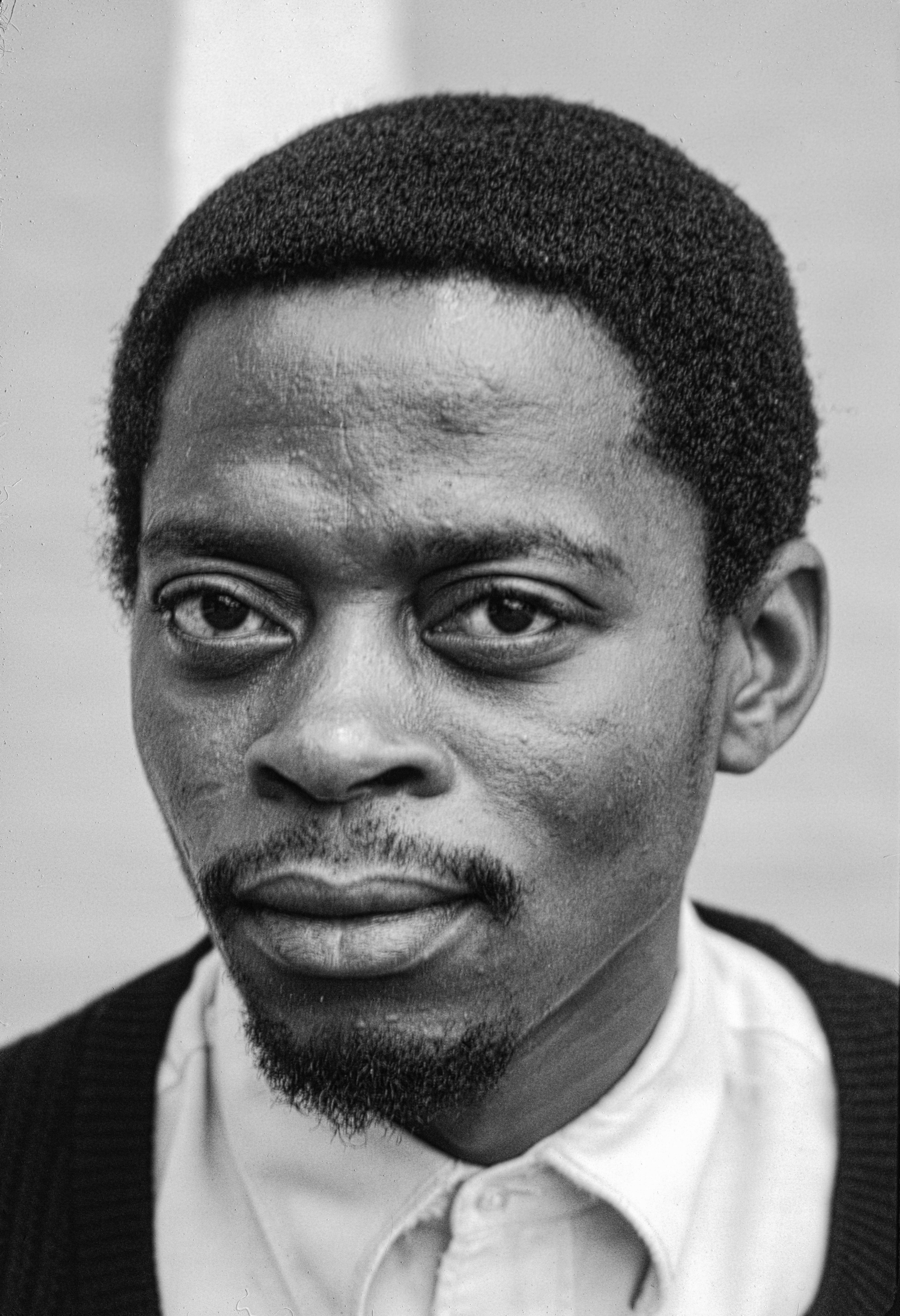
- Born: Ezrom Kgobokanyo Sebata Legae; 1 June 1938; Johannesburg, South Africa
- Died: 5 January 1999 (aged 60); Johannesburg, South Africa
- Education: Polly Street Art Centre
- Known for: Sculpture, Drawing
- Notable work: Sculptures- Young Man; Embrace; Carcass; Lamenting Woman, Reclining Figure I; Striding Girl; Head of a Wise Man, Elongated Head, Conical Head, Small Head, Buffalo Head, Thin Head, Long Necked Tilted Head - "Stargazer; Standing Figures I and II; Large Standing Figure; Young Woman. Drawings - Chicken Series (1977 - 1978); Freedom is Dead - Series 1 (1979).
- Movement: African Modernism
- Patrons: Egon Guenther
- Website: www.kumalo-legae.org

Ezrom Kgobokanyo Sebata Legae (1 June 1938 – 5 January 1999) was a South African sculptor, draughtsman, and teacher. Together with Anton van Wouw, Edoardo Villa and Sydney Kumalo he is regarded as one of South Africa's best sculptors. In addition, he is considered a foremost South African draughtsman.

== Life and career ==
Ezrom Kgobokanyo Sebata Legae was born on 1 June 1938 in Vrededorp, Johannesburg. He was educated at St Cyprian's Primary School in Sophiatown, then at Madibane High School in Diepkloof, Soweto. Legae studied at the Polly Street Art Centre beginning in 1959; from 1960 until 1964 he attended the Jubilee Art Centre and worked with Cecil Skotnes and Sydney Kumalo. When Sydney Kumalo retired from his teaching post at the Jubilee Art Centre in 1964, Ezrom Legae replaced him first as an assistant and then as a co-director of the Centre. From 1965 to 1972, Legae was represented by the influential Johannesburg gallerist Egon Guenther and from 1973 until his death by the Goodman Gallery in Johannesburg. Over his lifetime Legae produced 55 sculptures:30 while represented by the Egon Guenther Gallery and 25 while represented by the Goodman Gallery; all these sculptures were cast in bronze by the Renzo Vignali foundry in Pretoria.

In 1970 he received a scholarship that allowed him to travel to Europe and the United States; between 1972 and 1974 he was director of the African Music and Drama Association Art Project (AMDA) at Dorkay House, Johannesburg, and from 1980 - 1981 he worked as an instructor at the Federated Union of Black Artists (FUBA), Johannesburg. Dorkay House is inextricably linked with the music of the black South African artists of the 1950s.

Legae is particularly well known for his later drawings: The Chicken Series (1977 - 1978) which was consolidated to became the Freedom is Dead - Series 1 (1979) for which Legae received an honourable mention at the Fifth Valparaiso Biennale in Chile in 1979.

In 1985, the Goodman Gallery arranged a series of exhibitions in the USA as a revival of the Amadlozi Group formed by Egon Guenther in 1963, but in name only; the Group retained three of the original members, Kumalo, Skotnes and Villa, with Legae added as a new member.

Legae worked full-time as an artist; he lived in Soweto with his family until his death.

Legae is best known for his powerful visual commentaries on the pathos and degradation of apartheid - a critique he extended to the persistence of poverty and racism in the post-apartheid years. He excelled as painter and sculptor of figures, heads and animals working with oil, conté, bronze, clay and mixed media.

== Awards and accolades ==
Ezrom Legae received many awards and accolades in acknowledgement of his talents, both in South Africa and internationally, at a time in South Africa’s history when official policies were intensely discriminatory and negatively impacted black people.

- 1967: Oppenheimer Sculpture Prize, Art South Africa Today, July 1967 at the University of Natal and the Durban Art Gallery. The award was for the sculpture Embrace (1966).
- 1967: Special mention, Fourteenth Exhibition of the Transvaal Academy, Johannesburg Art Gallery, October/November 1967. The sculpture Striding Girl (1967) received special mention.
- 1969: Fifteenth Exhibition of the Transvaal Academy, Johannesburg City Library, March 1969. Legae received a certificate of merit for Young Man (1968).
- 1970: US-SALEP Leadership Exchange Program scholarship to visit the USA, 17 September – 15 December 1970. 1972: Bursary from the Merit Grant Fund, USA, which supported the African Music and Drama Association Art Project.
- 1972: Legae was one of four artists, selected for the Venice Biennale. South Africa was ultimately denied an invitation, the result of the cultural boycott, implemented by the UN General Assembly in 1969.
- 1979: Honourable mention for Freedom is Dead Series 1, Fifth Biennale exhibition, Valparaiso, Chile.
- 1989: Sculpture Commission The large Point of Departure sculpture was commissioned by AFROX for the front entrance of the Glynnwood Hospital, Harrison Street, Benoni. The current whereabouts of the sculpture is unknown.

== Exhibitions ==
Ezrom Legae's sculptures were exhibited on many occasions during his lifetime and after his death in solo and group exhibitions both at leading South African galleries and at high profile galleries in Europe and the USA.

- Opening of Egon Guenther’s New Private Gallery, Linksfield, Johannesburg, 1965
- Ezrom Legae, First Solo Exhibition, Egon Guenther Gallery, Linksfield, Johannesburg, 1966
- South African Breweries Biennale Art Prize, 1967
- Art South Africa Today, University of Natal and Durban Art Gallery, 1967
- Ezrom Legae, Solo Exhibition, Natal Society of Arts Gallery, Durban, 1967
- Ezrom Legae, Solo Exhibition, United States Information Services, Shakespeare House, Johannesburg, 1967
- Exhibition of the ‘Guenther Group’– Sydney Kumalo, Hannes Harrs, Ezrom Legae and Cecil Skotnes: Leader Gallery Grahamstown, 1967
- Fourteenth Exhibition of the Transvaal Academy, Johannesburg Art Gallery, 1967
- Exhibition of Busts in Sculpture, South African Arts Association Gallery, Pretoria, 1967
- Group Exhibition: Peter Haden, Hannes Harrs, Sydney Kumalo, Ezrom Legae, Edoardo Villa and the Unknown Masters of Africa, Egon Guenther Gallery, Johannesburg, 1968
- Fifteenth Exhibition of the Transvaal Academy, Johannesburg City Library, 1969
- Connoisseur’s Choice, Johannesburg College of Education, 1969
- S.A. Kuns/Art 1971, Republic Festival Art Exhibition, National gallery, Cape Town, 1971
- RSA Exhibition, Tentoonstelling 1972, South African Association of Arts, 1972
- Group Exhibition of Sculpture, Contemporary and Traditional African Art, Gallery International, Cape Town, 1973
- Contemporary African Art in South Africa, University of Fort Hare Collection, touring exhibition,1979
- Beeldhou 80/ Sculpture 80, University of Pretoria Merensky Library, Pretoria, 1980
- Tributaries – A View of Contemporary South African Art, Africana Museum, Johannesburg, 1985
- Amadlozi ’85, USA, 1985
- The Neglected Tradition: Towards a New History of South African Art (1930 - 1988), Johannesburg Art Gallery, 1989
- Vita Art Now 1989, Johannesburg Art Gallery, 1990
- Ezrom Legae, ART21 ’90 Basel, Switzerland, 1990
- Group Exhibition. Prophecy: Legae, Skotnes, Koloane, Goodman Gallery, Johannesburg, 1993
- An Exhibit of Contemporary African Art, World Space Centre, Washington DC, USA, 1998
- Remembering Legae: 1937 – 1999. An exhibition of Sculptures and Drawings, Goodman Gallery, Johannesburg, 1999
- Contemporary African Art, Five Artists, Diverse Trends, Eiteljorg Gallery, Indianapolis Museum of Art, 2000 – 2001
- A Labour of Love–Art of South Africa, Weltkulturen Museum, Frankfurt, Germany, 2015/2016
- Re/discovery and Memory, the works of Kumalo, Legae, Nitegeka and Villa, Norval Foundation, Cape Town, 2018
- A Black Aesthetic: A View of South African Art, 1970–1990 Standard Bank Art Gallery, Johannesburg, 2019
- The Sculptures of Sydney Kumalo and Ezrom Legae, a Retrospective; Strauss & Co., Johannesburg, 2023
- Ezrom Legae: Beasts, High Museum of Art, Atlanta, USA, 2025

== Sources ==
- Nel, Karel (2018). Re/discovery and Memory: The works of Sydney Kumalo, Ezrom Legae, Serge Alain Nitegeka and Edoardo Villa. Norval Foundation. ISBN 978-0-6207-9391-9.
- Watkins, Gavin Graham; Skinner, Charles (2023). The Sculptures of Sydney Kumalo and Ezrom Legae: A Catalogue Raisonné. Strauss & Company. ISBN 978-0-6397-6015-5.
