= Cecil Skotnes =

South African artist (1926–2009)

- Born: 1 June 1926; East London, Cape Province, South Africa
- Died: 4 April 2009 (aged 82)
- Education: University of the Witwatersrand

Cecil Skotnes (1 June 1926 – 4 April 2009) was a prominent South African artist.

He was born in East London in 1926, studied drawing in Florence, Italy, the Witwatersrand Technical Art School and then the University of the Witwatersrand. He was appointed cultural officer in charge of the influential Polly Street Art Centre in 1952. Skotnes was a founding member of the Amadlozi Group in 1961. In 1979 he moved to Cape Town, where he lived until his death. He died on 4 April 2009 at the age of 82. In 2003, he was awarded the Order of the Ikhamanga (Gold) by the South African government for his contribution to South African art.

== Early life ==
Cecil Skotnes was born in 1926 in East London, South Africa. His father, Edwin Andor Eilertsen Skotnes was Norwegian, born in Ankenes in 1888. As a young man, he was ordained a Lutheran pastor, and travelled to Canada where he met Cecil's mother Florence Kendall who was serving in the Salvation Army. They married and began a life as missionaries in Africa, first along the east coast and later settling in South Africa. Cecil was their fourth child. He remembers drawing as a young boy, and being commended at school for his talent and creativity. He also remembers the freedom of playing in the streets and countryside, of taking a donkey to the rivers on the outskirts of Johannesburg, of fishing and exploring the old artesian wells and stone ruins of iron-age settlements. He remembers this highveld landscape as a rough place inscribed and abstracted with traces of the past. He recalls the quality of light and space and the hot African sun – a place that was to make a powerful impression on the development of his creative style.

After finishing school, Cecil worked for some months in a draughtsman's office, leaving this in 1944 to join the South African forces in Europe. He fought in Egypt and in Italy, and there again, the landscape of the desert and of the Apennines with their decimated buildings on the top of hills and the ruins of bombardment was to contribute to his developing sensitivity to light and space and place. At the end of the war, Cecil spent time in Florence, drawn to the place in a way that made it almost impossible for him to return home. Here he saw the work of Masaccio, Giotto and Donatello – artists whose work was to become a major inspiration to him. Europe was, however, starkly contrasting to Africa. Colour and shape was different as was the experience of time and place. In Europe history is, in one sense, constantly on display; in South Africa, much is hidden beneath the surface. In Europe there is a sense of human closeness, even claustrophobia; in South Africa space is almost endless. He was fascinated by this closeness, by the rich heritage of Greek mythology and Greek and Roman architecture and art. He was nourished by the space, its harshness and its sense of wild mystery.

After returning to Johannesburg, Cecil Skotnes studied at the University of the Witwatersrand completing a Bachelor of Fine Arts Degree in 1950. He was a member of the Wits Group, that included Christo Coetzee, Larry Scully and Cecily Sash. He met Thelma Carter at that time, they were married in 1951, and he returned with her to Europe where they stayed for nine months. Again, Europe was to have a profound influence on him through the experience of the Egyptian, Assyrian and pre-classical Greek art that he saw in places such as the British Museum. It was, however, the colonial collections from Africa that were to have the greater impact. Cecil may well have stayed in Europe were it not for this, but instead he was drawn back to Africa, and like his father many years before him he made South Africa his permanent home.

== Artistic career ==
Initially Skotnes painted but was soon encouraged by a friend, the master goldsmith and art collector Egon Guenther to try woodcutting. It proved to be a perfect medium for him. His early woodcuts were of landscapes, influenced by the work of Willie Baumeister and Rudolph Sharpf, but his contrasting experiences of the European and the African landscape drove him to try to develop a genre and a style that was uniquely South African. This challenge was not only iconographical, it was formal too, and the medium of woodcutting offered Cecil the possibility of finding new form for the symbolism he increasingly began to attach to a particularly local vision. Though Cecil was later to return to painting, woodcutting and engraving has been an enduringly loved medium. In later years he used it less for land and figure-scapes than as a medium for narrative, and it was in colour woodcut that he produced ground-breaking portfolios of image and text around the themes of neglected South African histories.

Cecil's early use of the medium of woodcutting soon translated into a focus on the block itself. Instead of cutting the block and then using it as a means to an end – the print – he began to colour and shape the blocks, using them as a surface for paint and dry pigment. He also began to work in mural, using a technique of coloured cement laid into lime plaster which he would then engrave away exposing layers of colour and incised lines. He carried out many public commissions in this medium.

Along with the changes in process and technique, came a shift from an interest in the landscape and the figure within the landscape, to a concern with some of the powerful narratives of South African history. One of these was the story, still relatively unknown amongst non-Zulu speaking South Africans, of the great Zulu king Shaka who was assassinated in 1828. It had served the purposes of the apartheid government to suppress African histories, or tell them in such a way as to cast them as barbaric or savage. Skotnes' work around the story of Shaka showed, by contrast, a heroic figure, comparable to the great heroes of classical Greece and his depictions of the figure of Shaka contributed to shifting public attitudes to the role of the great nation states in pre-colonial South Africa.

He was part of the Amadlozi Group founded in 1961, which included Cecily Sash, Edoardo Villa, Giuseppe Cattaneo, and Sydney Kumalo.

== Move to Cape Town ==
In the late 1970s, Cecil moved from the highveld to Cape Town. This represented a radical shift in environment and a move to a more contemplative way of interacting with the landscape. The Cape is suffused with blues and violets, the light is softer, more influenced by rolling cloud banks that drift in from the north west, and the greys and greens of the sea. At this time he made a series of landscapes influenced by the ocean and at the same time he recalled the landscapes he had visited in earlier years. Included in these were the memories of the Brandberg, a great mountain which rises out of the Namib desert and which was the home of aboriginal hunter-gatherers who left their own paintings on its rock surfaces many thousands of years ago. In these works Cecil reaffirmed that ours is a landscape not only full of the colour and heat and light of Africa, but a landscape full of history and memory – places most alive to the human drama they have witnessed.

During these years, Skotnes also worked as a teacher and mentor; among those he taught privately was Lucky Sibiya. He attributed to his parents the view that the value of one's achievements can be measured by what one leaves behind. His body of work has influenced perceptions of South African creative heritage. Skotnes sought to nurture talent and encourage creativity, particularly in areas where the apartheid government had excluded such opportunities. His efforts have been described as contributing to the diversity of South African art.

== Polly Street Centre ==
In the mid-1950s, Cecil accepted a post as the Cultural Recreation Officer at the "Non-Europeans Affairs Department" in Johannesburg. His major task in this position was to run the Polly Street Centre, which was concerned with both education and recreation for black adults and children. The centre hosted choirs and bands, there was boxing and judo and ballroom dancing. When he took this job, however, there was only one art student enrolled, yet today, as a result of his role in the centre, Polly Street is almost only remembered as an art school. As the director of Polly Street, he travelled between the city and the townships where he facilitated many cultural activities. Much of his work happened after hours when adults were free from work to undertake leisure activities. While he carried out this work as part of his job, his own interest and ultimate aim was to develop Polly Street into a Centre where art was taken seriously and not just seen as a hobby. At the time there were no art schools to which blacks were permitted entrance and universities were not allowed to accept black students. Cecil wanted to create a place where he could train professionals and give talented young black adults a chance at a career in art.

This initiative, which was to launch the careers of many black artists, was no easy endeavour. Resources were limited and classes were restricted to after working hours. Students had to make use of cheap paper and poster paints. At the same time, the authorities were hostile to individual attempts to educate blacks, though officials were reluctant to visit the place at night and so, initially at least, kept away. Cecil looked for sponsorship and found companies willing to support paper and other art materials. A local food store donated soup and this, along with the background sounds of jazz from the hall next door, began to attract increasing numbers of students to the centre.

In addition to teaching classes, Cecil tried to find ways to develop a sense of professionalism amongst his protégés, and it is here that his work as an artist and teacher/advocate of black art in South Africa came together in interesting ways. While it is true that as an artist the landscape and the figure within it has been Cecil's abiding theme, it has not been the only one to absorb his creative mind. Being raised in the home of missionaries and with a love for Catholic Italy, Cecil has had a greater than average exposure to the traditions of the Church. It was to the church that Cecil first looked to expose his more talented students to the opportunities of the professional artist. The first significant commission Skotnes secured was for Sydney Kumalo (later to become a well known and highly respected artist) who, along with other Polly Street students and Cecil's help, decorated the Catholic Church of Kroonstad. Other commissions to make sculptures and stations of the cross for various churches followed, and soon a growing number of black artist were making and marketing their work. The ripple effect was profound. Skotnes arranged for more commissions and exhibitions to take place, and by the 1960s, many galleries were actively seeking the work of black artists. By the time the apartheid authorities effectively shut down Polly Street (such a thriving centre could not be tolerated in a "white" area), there was a prosperous community of black artists.

== Later life ==
In his later years, Skotnes had begun to reflect more on his own origins. The journey of his father from Norway to Canada and then to Africa, the death of his uncle on the Spitzbergen, the cold dim landscape of the Arctic Circle and its contrast to the heat of the South African highveld, and the damp richness of the Cape coast. He has produced works on these themes, most notably two portraits of the dead uncle, a trapper who was found, frozen in his hut in the company of the bears, foxes and birds he had hunted. But his last works are about none of these things in particular, yet about all of them in general. In these engraved paintings can be discerned the shadows of the painted altarpieces of the Renaissance, of lost kingdoms and of ruined cities of the Mediterranean. These pictures hold the memories of the gold death masks of Mycenae, the bronze figures of Delphi, the stained pottery and the carved sticks of the early agriculturalists of eastern Africa. In their line and gestures, they lament the lives lost, the sacrifice and cruelty and the potential not realised by the miserable system of separate development that held South Africa in its grip for half a century. Above all they celebrate art as the realisation of the most valuable of human all human experiences and the one that should be most accessible to everyone – the imagination.

Cecil Skotnes had a long and influential career that impacted his family, students, fellow artists, and collectors of his work. His contributions to art and education were widely recognized. Several universities, including University of Cape Town, University of the Witwatersrand, and Rhodes University, awarded him honorary degrees. He also received a gold medal from the State President for his service to the country and for his role in promoting the de-racialisation of South African art.

== Musical reflections ==
Skotnes's artworks have inspired musical compositions by Peter Klatzow: his A Sense of Place for marimba and cello was inspired by two artworks, The Mask and Shaka's Victory Dance.

== See also ==
- Ezrom Legae
- Louis Maqhubela
- Durant Sihlali
- Sydney Kumalo
- Egon Guenther
