= Durant Sihlali =

South African artist

- Born: 5 March 1935; Germiston, South Africa
- Died: May 2004 (aged 69)

Durant Sihlali (5 March 1935 – 2004) was a South African artist. He was born in Germiston, was Head of Fine Arts at the Federated Union of Black Artists (Fuba) from 1983 until 2004 and exhibited in Nuremberg, Athens, and Palermo.

== Biography ==
He studied art at the Moroko Chiawelo Centre from 1950 to 1953. From 1953 to 1958 he studied under Cecil Skotnes at the Polly Street Art Centre.

== Work ==
His work is modernist and realist and his first medium was watercolours. He later turned to sculpture using metal from car wrecks. During the early 1980s Sihlali produced a series of carved wooden sculptures of workers in the coal mines of the Witwatersrand. He has exhibited in Trees Collection Gallery in Beverly Hills. According to Sihlali's wife Anna, he always wanted to create a museum of his work.

== Sources ==
- Richards, Colin; Klopper, Sandra (2006). "The Double Agent: Humanism, History, and Allegory in the Art of Durant Sihlali (1939-2004): [With Commentary]". African Arts. 39 (1). UCLA James S. Coleman African Studies Center: 60–69, 94–96. doi:10.1162/afar.2006.39.1.60. JSTOR 20447752.
