= The Rumps =

Twin-headland promontory in north Cornwall, UK

Coordinates: 50.59208°N 4.92030°W

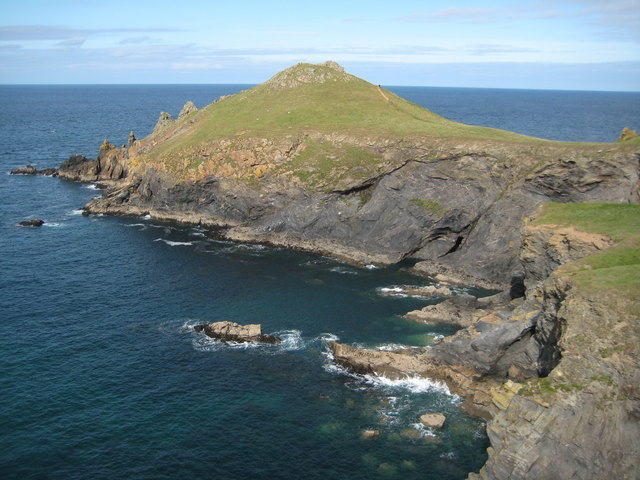
The Rumps

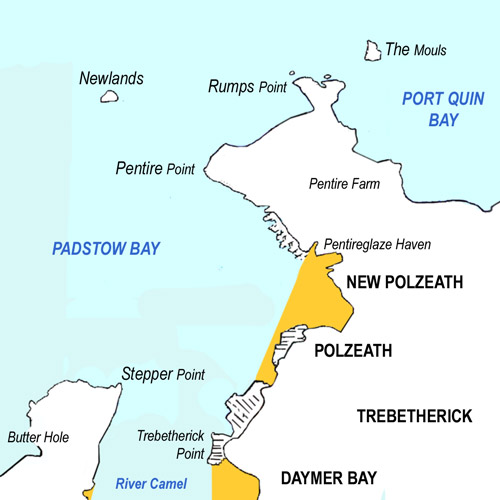
Sketch map showing The Rumps, Pentire Head and the surrounding area

The Rumps (Cornish: Penn Tir, lit. 'headland') (grid reference SW 934 810) is a twin-headland promontory at the north-east corner of Pentire Head in north Cornwall, England, United Kingdom. The Rumps is attested as a name for the site from 1826 but is assumed to be significantly older.

The promontory is formed from hard basaltic rock (see also Geology of Cornwall) and projects north into the Atlantic Ocean. Its headlands lie east-to-west. A small offshore island named The Mouls lies off the eastern headland; the western headland is named Rumps Point.

Access to The Rumps is via the South West Coast Path from Polzeath or by an inland public footpath from the car park at Pentire Farm. The entire Pentire headland, including The Rumps, is under the stewardship of the National Trust. Sightseeing boat tours regularly sail around The Rumps from the nearby port of Padstow. It is also listed by the RSPB as one of Cornwall's "prime spots" to see the corn bunting, a species of high conservation priority.

== Iron Age fort ==
The Rumps is the site of an Iron Age promontory fort which was first recorded in 1584 by John Norden and also appears on the first Ordnance Survey map in 1881. The fort was the subject of an archaeological survey between 1963 and 1967, with the findings being published in 1974 in Cornish Archaeology / Hendhyscans Kernow, 13, pp 5-50.

It described three phases of building and two of occupation between the 4th century BC and the first century AD, with round houses containing pottery using clay from the Lizard, bones and domestic items (like querns and spindle whorls) having been excavated. The find of an amphora also suggests trade with the Mediterranean.

Being connected to the mainland with only a very narrow isthmus, the site is an excellent defensive position. The fort has three ramparts, built in two phases and with central entrances. (Note: Payton suggests that there are four ramparts rather than three.)

== "For the Fallen" ==
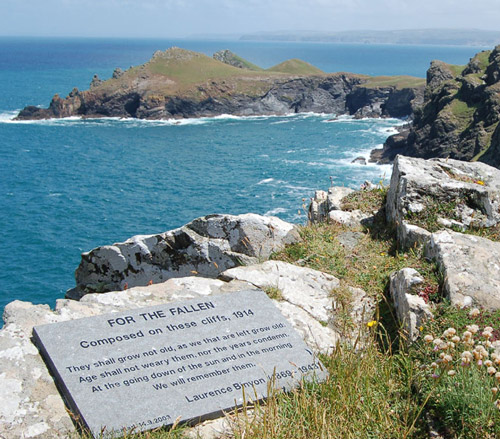
"For the Fallen" plaque

The poet Laurence Binyon wrote "For the Fallen" in 1914 while sitting on the cliffs between Pentire Point and The Rumps. A stone plaque was erected at the spot in 2001 to commemorate the fact. The plaque bears an inscription which reads For The Fallen composed on these cliffs 1914 and quotes the stanza popularly known as The Ode.
