= Cecily Sash =

South African artist (1924–2019)

- Born: 1924/1925; Delmas, Transvaal, Union of South Africa
- Died: 2019; Britain
- Education: Witwatersrand Technical College Art School, Chelsea College of Arts, Camberwell College of Art, University of Witwatersrand
- Occupation: Artist

Cecily Sash (1924/1925 – 2019) was a South African artist, designer, and teacher. She taught design at the University of the Witwatersrand for more than 20 years.

== Early life and education ==
Cecily Sash was born in 1924 or 1925 in Delmas, a small town in Transvaal, Union of South Africa to parents Bessie (née Liverman) and Max Sash.

From 1943 to 1946, she studied art at Witwatersrand Technical College Art School in Johannesburg, studying under Maurice van Essche. Followed by study at Chelsea Polytechnic (now Chelsea College of Arts) in London, under Henry Moore; and Camberwell School of Art (now Camberwell College of Art) with Victor Pasmore. In 1954, Sash received her fine arts degree from University of Witwatersrand.

== Career ==
After graduation she briefly taught at Jeppe Girls’ High School in Johannesburg. Shortly after she started teaching at the University of the Witwatersrand, where she remained until the 1970s. In 1965, she was awarded an Oppenheimer grant in order to further study arts education in Britain and the United States. In 1974, she moved to Britain, where she settled in the Welsh Marches.

Sash was primarily a painter, but also worked in mosaic and tapestries. Her paintings had different focus periods including one of abstraction, and one of environmental focus. Sash painted many South African murals that were commissioned, including at the Transvaal provincial administration building in Pretoria; the University of the Witwatersrand; and the Transvaal Institute of Architects.

She was part of the Amadlozi Group founded in 1961, which included Cecil Skotnes, Edoardo Villa, Guiseppe Cattaneo, and Sydney Kumalo. The name “Amadlozi” (Zulu: ancestors) was used for a conscious appropriation of African sculptural traditions. In 1965, Sash was included in the seminal South Africa artists’ exhibition at the Grosvenor Gallery in London.

Sash died in 2019, at the age of 94.

== Bibliography ==
- Sash, Cecily; Martienssen, Heather (1974). Cecily Sash: Retrospective 1954-1974 (exhibition). Pretoria Art Museum (South Africa), Durban Art Gallery (South Africa). Pretoria Art Museum (South Africa).
- Thorne, Victor (1999). Cecily Sash: Working Years. Studio Sash.
- Sash, Cecily (2004). Cecily Sash (exhibition). Millinery Works Gallery. Millinery Works, Cecily Sash.
- Sash, Cecily (2007). Cecily Sash: Food for Thought: an Exhibition of Recent Works (exhibition). Millinery Works Gallery. Millinery Works.
