= Edoardo Villa =

South African sculptor

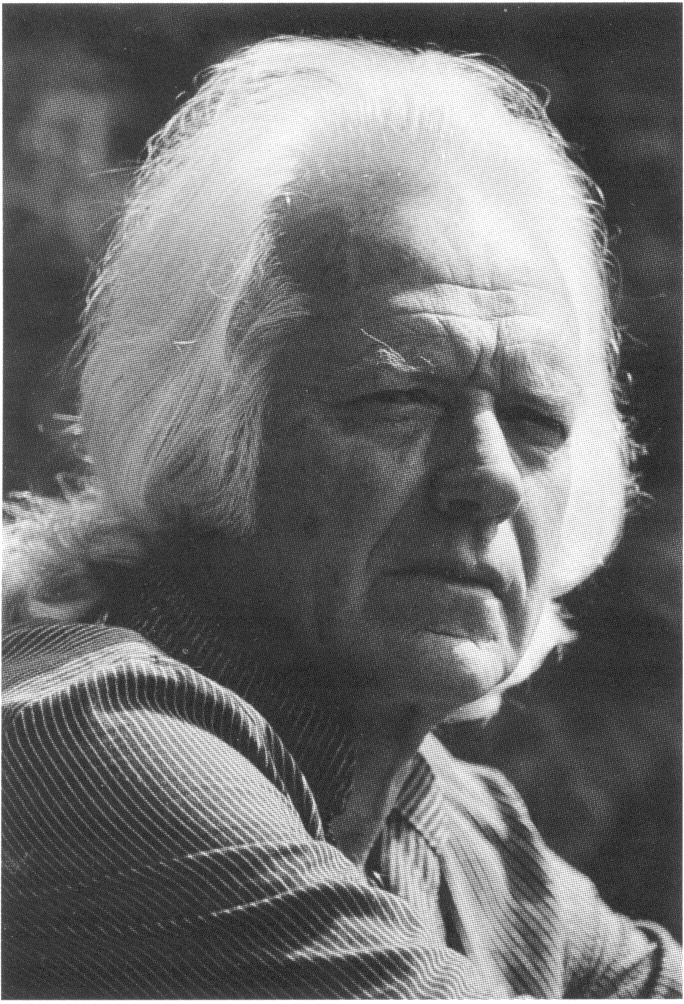
- Born: Edoardo Daniele Villa; 31 May 1915; Bergamo, Italy
- Died: 1 May 2011 (aged 95); Johannesburg, South Africa
- Education: Andrea Fontini Art School
- Notable work: The Knot, Cape Town; Confrontation, Johannesburg; Thrust, University of Pretoria
- Movement: Abstract art cubism
- Awards: Honorary Professorship University of Pretoria; Medal of Honour: South African Academy of Science & Art, 1979

Edoardo Daniele Villa (1915–2011) was a South African renowned sculptor who worked primarily in steel, and bronze.

== Early life ==
Villa was born in Bergamo, Italy and he studied at the Andrea Fontini Art School. In 1937 due to a shortage in work Edoardo Villa volunteered for the Italian Army and studied to become and officer. He went to Spain as part of the Italian Army to take part in the Spanish Civil War but the war ended before he was deployed. He was qualified as a Captain and was recalled to serve in the World War II. By 1940 he was posted to North Africa, On 9 December 1940, the night before the Battle of Sidi Barrani on a scouting mission where he was injured and captured by the English. In 1941 he was shipped to South Africa where he then spent the next four years at the Zonderwater prisoner of war camp. Zonderwater was opened in February 1941 and by the end of 1942 and held 63 000 prisoners under the care of Colonel H.F. Prinsloo. Villa sculpted, Prinsloo’s bust in 1944 which is on display at the South African Military History Museum in Johannesburg. After his release, Villa remained in South Africa where he continued his vocation as a sculptor.

== Career beginnings ==
Villa started work with conventional heads and figures and changed to work on stylized abstractions. His work includes abstract explanations of the human condition but retains some figurative concepts. Villa's work has a strong cross-cultural synthesis which involves the Italian and the African. It is clearly informed by the cubism of Picasso (who had discovered African art in Paris at the Trocadero).

Villa gave an interview in which he said, “After being a prisoner of war in South Africa I decided to stay and start my career because of the opportunities available for the youth, the ‘open space’ as opposed to the ‘closed’ life of a continental. Everything in Europe I felt had been done, questioned and exhausted. Here, in Africa, I felt I had the opportunity to explore ... If anything could sum up my fundamental concern in art, it is that of the human and the individual – the human condition …. Museums are marvellous but human participation, physical proximity and tactile engagement are more important.”

== Style and technique ==
Villa's sculpture developed further during the 1950s, when the use of cut steel and bronze. At this time he also taught at the Polly Art Centre in Johannesburg. The Polly Art Centre was founded as an adult education institution; in 1952 it was converted into an art and exhibition centre. Until its closure in 1960, it was the only place – apart from a few private galleries – where black artists in Johannesburg could pursue their art and show their works.

In 1963, along with Cecil Skotnes, Cecily Sash, Giuseppe Cattaneo, and Sydney Kumalo, Villa made up the artist group “Amadlozi” (Zulu for “ancestors”) for the conscious appropriation of African sculptural traditions.

Villa's work includes larger than life steel installations, such as Reclining Figure in Pieter Roos Park, Johannesburg. This work was intended as a play statue for children, paid for by Anglo American, selected by the Parktown and Westcliffe Heritage Trust and donated to the City of Johannesburg and unveiled by the Deputy Mayor of Johannesburg Councillor C.E. Fabel on 8 September 1984.

Edoardo Villa represented South Africa at the Venice Biennale on five occasions and he has received awards at the São Paulo Biennales of 1957 and 1959. He has exhibited in over a hundred shows in Italy, Europe, England, Israel, South America, Africa and the United States.

In 1994/1995 Villa donated 140 small and 10 large works to the University of Pretoria. On 31 May 1995, to celebrate the artist's 80th birthday, the Edoardo Villa Museum was officially opened at the University of Pretoria, South Africa.

Villa lived and worked at his home in Johannesburg, He was a friend of the artist and art collector, Vittorino Meneghelli, the author Jillian Becker and the architect Monty Sack. Villa died in hospital on 1 May 2011 at age 95.

== See also ==
- Edoardo Villa Museum
