= Michaelis School of Fine Art =

Art school of the University of Cape Town

Coordinates: 33°55′48″S 18°24′49″E

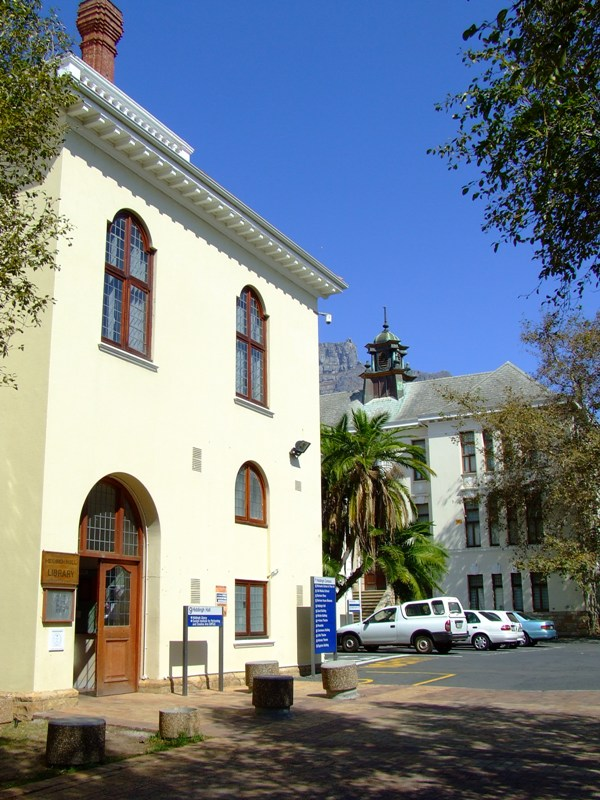
- Hiddingh Hall Library on Hiddingh Campus in Gardens, Cape Town.
- Established: 1925
- Director: Dr Kurt Campbell
- Location: Cape Town, Western Cape, South Africa
- Campus: Hiddingh Campus
- Website: www.michaelis.uct.ac.za

The Michaelis School of Fine Art is a public tertiary art school in the Cape Town suburb of Gardens. It was founded in 1925 and is named after its benefactor, Max Michaelis. It is the Fine Arts department of the University of Cape Town. There are three research institutions associated with the school, namely The Lucy Lloyd Archive, Research and Exhibition Centre (LLAREC), the Centre for Curating the Archive (CCA) and the Katrine Harries Print Cabinet, which has been instrumental in promoting printmaking as well as conserving and exhibiting prints in the collection.The major graduate degree offered at the School is the Master of Fine Art where students work in both new and traditional fine art disciplines.

== Program ==
Courses are offered in New Media, Painting, Photography, Printmaking, Sculpture and Curatorship.

== Notable alumni ==
- Theo Aronson (biographer)
- Wayne Barker (artist)
- Breyten Breytenbach (poet and painter)
- Julia Rosa Clark (artist)
- Tom Cullberg (artist)
- Lionel Davis (artist)
- Marlene Dumas (artist)
- Lungiswa Gqunta (artist)
- Matthew Hindley (artist)
- Gavin Jantjes (artist)
- Le Roux Smith Le Roux (artist)
- Billy Mandindi (artist)
- Gerhard Marx (artist)
- Nandipha Mntambo (artist)
- Zwelethu Mthethwa (artist)
- Brett Murray (artist)
- Zelda Nolte (artist)
- Cameron Platter (artist)
- Berni Searle (artist)
- Sean Slemon (artist)
- Guy Tillim (photographer)
- Vivian van der Merwe (artist)
- Pauline Vogelpoel (arts administrator)
- Henk van Woerden (artist)
- Zapiro (cartoonist)

== Notable staff ==
- Bruce Arnott
- Rosa Hope
- Stanley Pinker
- Virginia MacKenny
- Judith Mason
- Ivan Mitford-Barberton
