= Community Arts Program =

The Community Arts Project (CAP) was a community arts center in Cape Town, South Africa. Founded in 1977. it provided accommodation, facilities, and training to aspiring artists, particularly those marginalised by apartheid.

== Historical context ==
CAP opened in 1977. in the midst of social and political turmoil. South Africa was then under the rule of apartheid, which enforced racial segregation, prioritising the needs of the white minority and marginalising the black and coloured majority. Among other laws enforcing segregation, the Group Areas Act of 1950 assigned people to live in different regions according to their race. Black and coloured individuals were relegated to townships outside the city centers, away from jobs and essential facilities.

Black children were also subjected to the "Bantu" education system, which was far inferior to that offered to white children and trained black children for jobs as labourers and servants. In protest, thousands of students took to the streets on 16 June 1976. These protests were met with violent police retaliation, and many schoolchildren were killed.

The period following the 1976 Soweto Uprisings saw a huge surge in community arts centers, largely related to "the burning social and political issues of the time." The lack of adequate art education in schools, and the blatant refusal of the government to provide better, prompted community members to provide education and facilities independent of the systems already in place. Arts centers gave disadvantaged individuals the skills to interact with the national and international arts scene at a time when art was viewed as "an elite, white privilege beyond the control of the ordinary individual."

CAP's beginnings were also embedded in the rise of the Black Consciousness Movement, which encouraged self-reliance and self-determination among non-white communities. The movement also strove to combat the self-devaluation which resulted from the conditions of apartheid. "The native detested white society, but was envious of it. Realising that his own skin prevented him from ever attaining privilege, the native despised his own blackness." To counter this, the Black Consciousness Movement encouraged personal dignity and pride in one's identity and culture.

In 1977, Steve Biko, the founder of the Black Consciousness Movement, died after violent police interrogation. As a result of his high profile, news of his death drew national and international attention. Within the country, the Black Consciousness Movement was supported more vehemently than ever, including within the art scene. Globally, many became aware of the brutality of the apartheid regime and began to more actively fight it.

== Mission ==
CAP was founded to provide accommodation, facilities, and training to artists, particularly those marginalised by apartheid. The training provided at CAP was meant to serve not only its members, but the larger community as well. The center was founded on the idea of "each one teach one" – after an artist had been trained, they would take what they had learned back to their community to help empower the broader society.

A large part of the work created at CAP was embedded in and served the struggle against apartheid. CAP is well known for its posters through the 1980s and early 1990s. "reclaiming public visual space through training people in producing posters." Many of these advertised activism and attempted to mobilise the oppressed. However, the center's main aim was providing opportunity to all in a non-sectarian, multiracial space. CAP never aligned itself with a particular political party and quite a bit of the work produced at CAP did not pertain directly to the struggle, but spanned a wide range of themes. CAP activist Ishmael Moss explains, "It was not so much pressure on the art to "toe the line", rather we worked to give the people space." Also, CAP distinguished itself as one of the few community arts centers which catered to all races, but was located in a white residential area rather than a township, drawing in liberal white artists as well as non-whites. Though it was not entirely without internal tension, CAP has been described as an "island outside the polarization in the rest of the country." It focused less on directly combating existing apartheid institutions and more on creating new multiracial ones.

It has been argued that this community itself, by its multiracial nature, served the anti-apartheid struggle just as well as the art intended to challenge segregation. The fight for equality "adopted its most literal expression as a fight for a political democracy in the production of protest posters; however even the ‘melting pot’ of different races and ideas created at CAP enacted a democratic community in opposition to state segregation." CAP aimed to provide a space for self-definition and healing, where "marginalized people could empower and humanize themselves through creativity."

== History ==
In 1976, lecturers from the University of Cape Town began two temporary projects, offering workshops to marginalised artists. While these were originally intended to be temporary projects, the enthusiastic response and demand for more workshops lead to the decision to open the more permanent Community Arts Project the following year.

When CAP opened in 1977, it was housed at 17 Main Road in the Cape Town suburb of Mowbray. In its early years, it was very community driven, classes being formed in response to requests for them. In addition to the visual arts, CAP taught theatre, dance and music, and (while priority was given to the arts) the center also offered yoga and karate classes. While it catered mainly to adults, weekly children's classes were offered as well.

In 1982, the Culture and Resistance Conference in Gaborone was attended by several members of CAP. The conference urged artists to use their skills to serve the communities around them. This marked the beginning of the increased politicisation of the center. The same year, CAP launched the Media Project, which produced silkscreen posters and was most closely associated with political activism. But the fine arts produced by the center also became increasingly directly political. Through the rest of the 1980s and early 1990s, CAP was much more of an anti-apartheid political figure. The South African Police "raided CAP four times in three months under emergency regulations, removing pamphlets, banners, photographs, diaries, and personal letters,". demonstrating the threat that the government perceived in the center.

In the early 1900s, independent community arts centers around the country fell into financial crisis. During the reign of apartheid, when many political organisations were banned, community centers served as covers for more direct political action. With the fall of apartheid, many politically motivated foreign investors withdrew funds as their objectives were achieved. They no longer saw the centers as weapons against apartheid. They also believed that the newly elected ANC government would take over funding these centers. However, this was not necessarily the case. The government funded 40 new centers, but provided very little support to the ones in existence.

The Community Arts Project was additionally affected by the enactment of the National Qualifications Framework (NQF) as defined by the South African Qualifications Authority, which defined standards that had to be achieved to grant qualification to learners. This did mean that artists training at CAP could now obtain widely recognised certification. However, it has been argued that the NQF's emphasis on the "scientific" methods of art didn't allow for as much exploration of theme which the center had previously focused on. Lionel Davis, a former facilitator at CAP said, "the problem with a qualification system for the arts is that the qualification does not make you an artist. Rather it is what you do with the space and resources you are provided with". Many people felt that CAP had "lost the vibrancy of a community centre". The bureaucracy of the system also added an additional obstacle to arts centers, particularly smaller ones.

Despite the struggles experienced during the transition, CAP was able to make ends meet and continue to produce many artistic individuals, many of whom went on to become successful artists. It was "one of the few art centres which survived from the 1980s into the 21st century and continued to provide art education for numerous individuals despite the many obstacles and difficulties it faced over the years."

In 2004, the Community Arts Project and the Media Project officially merged to create the Arts and Media Access Centre.

In 2008, the center was forced to close its doors, due to lack of funding.

== The archive today ==
After the center closed its doors, the archive of its works lay dormant for several years. However, in 2012 the Center for Humanities Research at the University of the Western Cape reopened the archive and assembled an exhibition to be shown at the Iziko South African National Gallery. The exhibition, “Uncontained: Opening the Community Arts Project archive," was intended to reopen the archive and revitalise it in mainstream cultural history. The exhibition, like the archive as a whole, was largely 1980's anti-apartheid art, but also showed pieces with a large range of themes and subjects. The National Gallery website explains the exhibition is an “open-ended and complex narrative of human experience, imagination, and social and personal relations in the world of apartheid and in its aftermath". The exhibition was also accompanied by a book by the same title, which shows several of the works on display and pairs them with pieces of literature to create a more complex dialogue around the art and writing. The book gives some history of the center and includes curatorial essays from the organisers. The exhibition's catalogue essay explains:

On the one hand, the resistance works on the show are reminders of an era in which artists responded to a crisis of the human condition resulting from apartheid. On the other, these artworks offer us the possibility for thinking about the post-apartheid present, given the dehumanizing legacy of apartheid. In both respects, they invite a re-imagining of political society in the face of unemployment, poverty, disease, unequal education, persistent racial divisions and new class polarizations. These works therefore remind us that the question of the human condition is still at the heart of understanding post-apartheid society. They also draw attention to the silence of cultural resistance in contemporary times.

Today, substantial parts of the work that was produced at the center is housed at the University of Cape Town (Manuscripts and Archives) and at the University of the Western Cape (Mayibuye Centre and Centre for Humanities Research).

== Artists ==
Artists who studied at CAP include:

- Tyrone Appollis
- Willie Bester
- Hamilton Budaza
- Dion Cupido
- Lionel Davis
- Thembinkosi Goniwe
- Sipho Hlatif
- Thami Kiti
- Billy Mandindi
- Xolile Mtakatya
- Dathini Mzayiya
- Angelo Pearce
- Soloman Siko
- Ishmael Thyssen
- Mandla Vanyaza
- Cameron Voyiya

== Sources ==
- Berndt, Jon (2007). From Weapon to Ornament: The CAP Media Project Posters (1982 to 1994). Cape Town: Arts and Media Access Centre.
- Heidi Grunenbaum and Emile Maurice, ed. (2012). Uncontained: Opening the Community Arts Project archive. Bellville, Cape Town: Center for Humanities Research (university of Western Cape). p. 13.
- Lochner, Eben. "The Community Arts Project (CAP): The Role of the Arts in Building Community and Artistic Development" (PDF). Rhodes University.
- Lochner, Eben (2 June 2011). "The Democratisation of Art: CAP as an alternative art space in South Africa" (PDF). Rhodes University. p. 2.
- "Uncontained: opening the Community Arts Project archive". Iziko: Museums of South Africa. Iziko Museums. 4 August 2012.
