= Rosa Hope =

English painter

Rosa Somerville Hope
- Born: 8 June 1902; Manchester, England
- Died: 7 May 1972 (aged 69); Kokstad, South Africa
- Occupation: English painter
- Notable work: The tile tableau of the Great Trek Centenary in the Irene Post Office

Rosa Hope painting in Natal Drakensberg

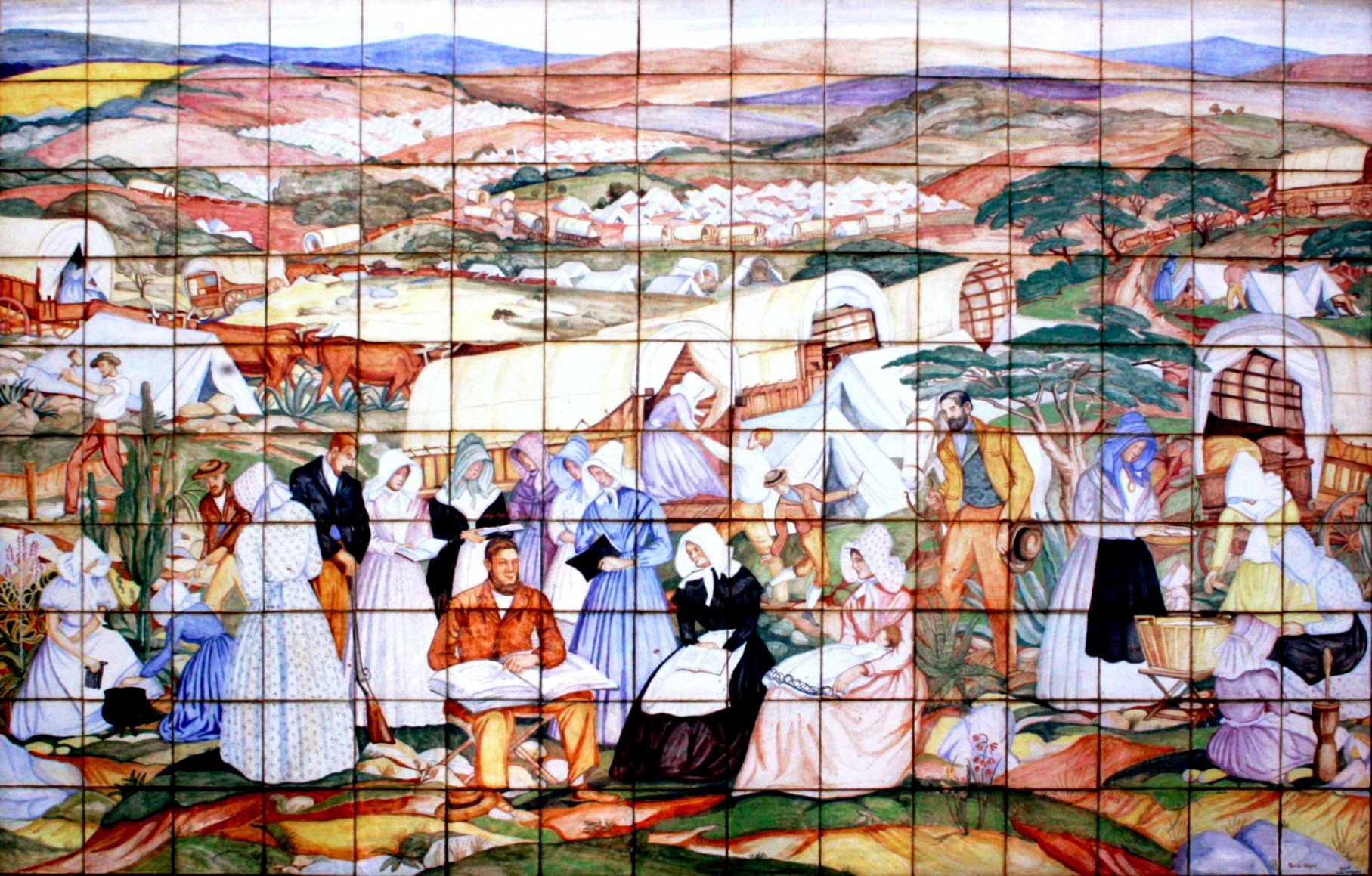
Tableau on Irene Post Office near Pretoria - 1940

Rosa Somerville Hope (8 June 1902, in Manchester, England – 7 May 1972, in Kokstad, South Africa), was an English painter who visited South Africa in 1935 and stayed on. Her mother was a teacher at the Camberwell School of Art and her father was recorded as an agent.

== Biography ==
Hope first went to a school in Romiley, but then attended the Manchester High School for Girls, with her twin sister Muriel. In 1918 she started training at the Slade School of Art in London on a scholarship of £20 and in 1926 won the Prix de Rome for her etching The Adoration of the Shepherds, which was subsequently shown at the Royal Academy. She studied under Henry Tonks (1862-1937), Philip Wilson Steer (1860-1942) and John Wheatley (1892-1955). At this time she was living at 40 Downshire Hill, Hampstead, N.W, the same house where Mark Rutherford, the novelist, lived in 1852. When she visited South Africa in 1935, her former teacher at the Slade School, Professor John Laviers Wheatley, offered her a teaching post at the Michaelis School of Fine Art at the University of Cape Town. She founded the school's printmaking and engraving department. In 1938 she accepted the post of Senior Lecturer in Fine Art at the University of Natal in Pietermaritzburg, where she remained until 1957. From here she made frequent painting trips to the Drakensberg and Transkei, occasionally accompanied by her friend and fellow painter, Phyllis McCarthy. The Centre for Visual Art at the University of Natal has been entrusted with a donation of her works. Rosa Hope designed the tile tableau of the Great Trek Centenary in the Irene Post Office in 1939.

In January 1923 she was elected an Associate of the Royal Society of Painter-Etchers and Engravers. She exhibited drawings at the New English Art Club, the Redfern Gallery, Old Bond Street and Messrs. P. and D. Colnaghi at the Grosvenor Galleries. She was a member of the Society of Graphic Art, the Hampstead Society of Artists and the Print Collectors’ Club.

She exhibited with the South African Society of Artists (SASA) until 1942.

== Gallery ==
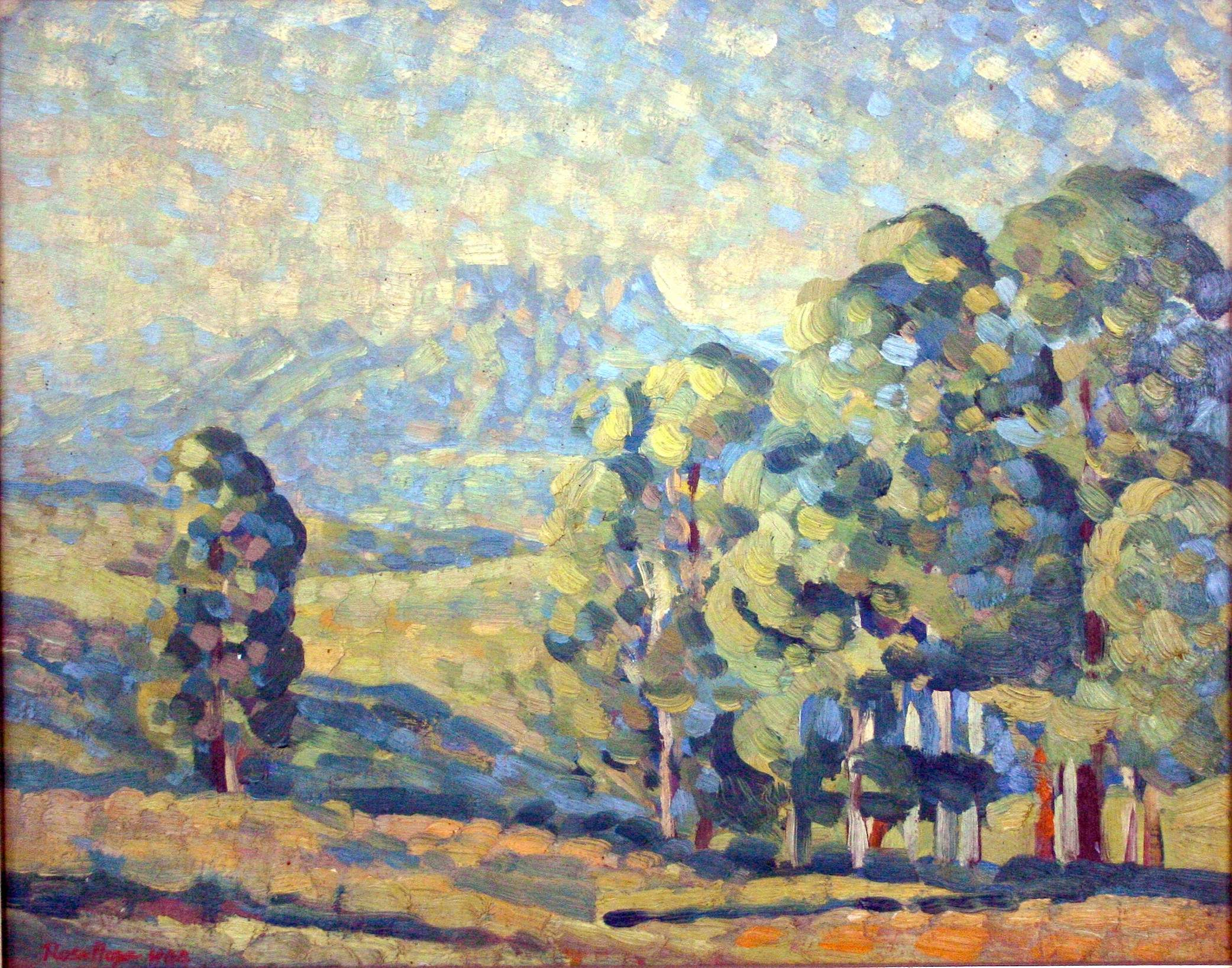
Gum trees, Pietermaritzburg area 1944

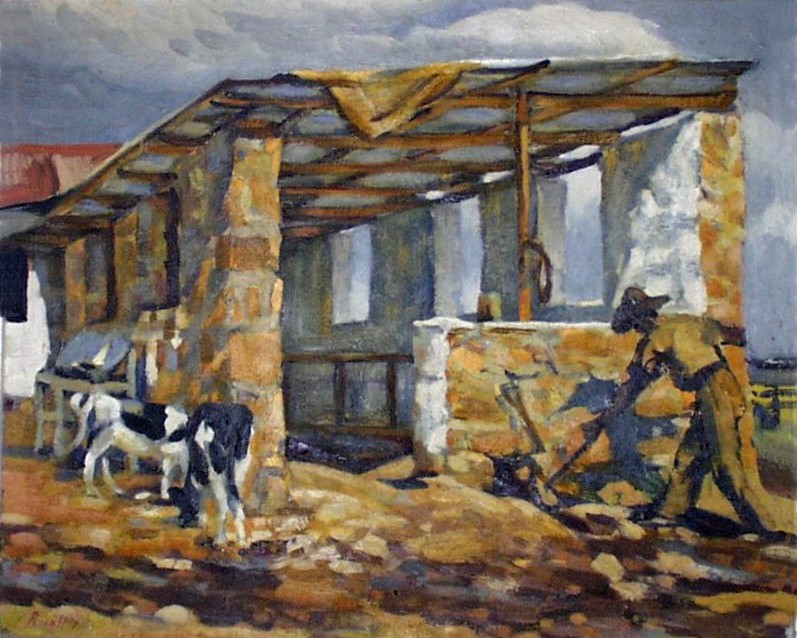
Cowshed at Glenaholm, Pietermaritzburg 1940s

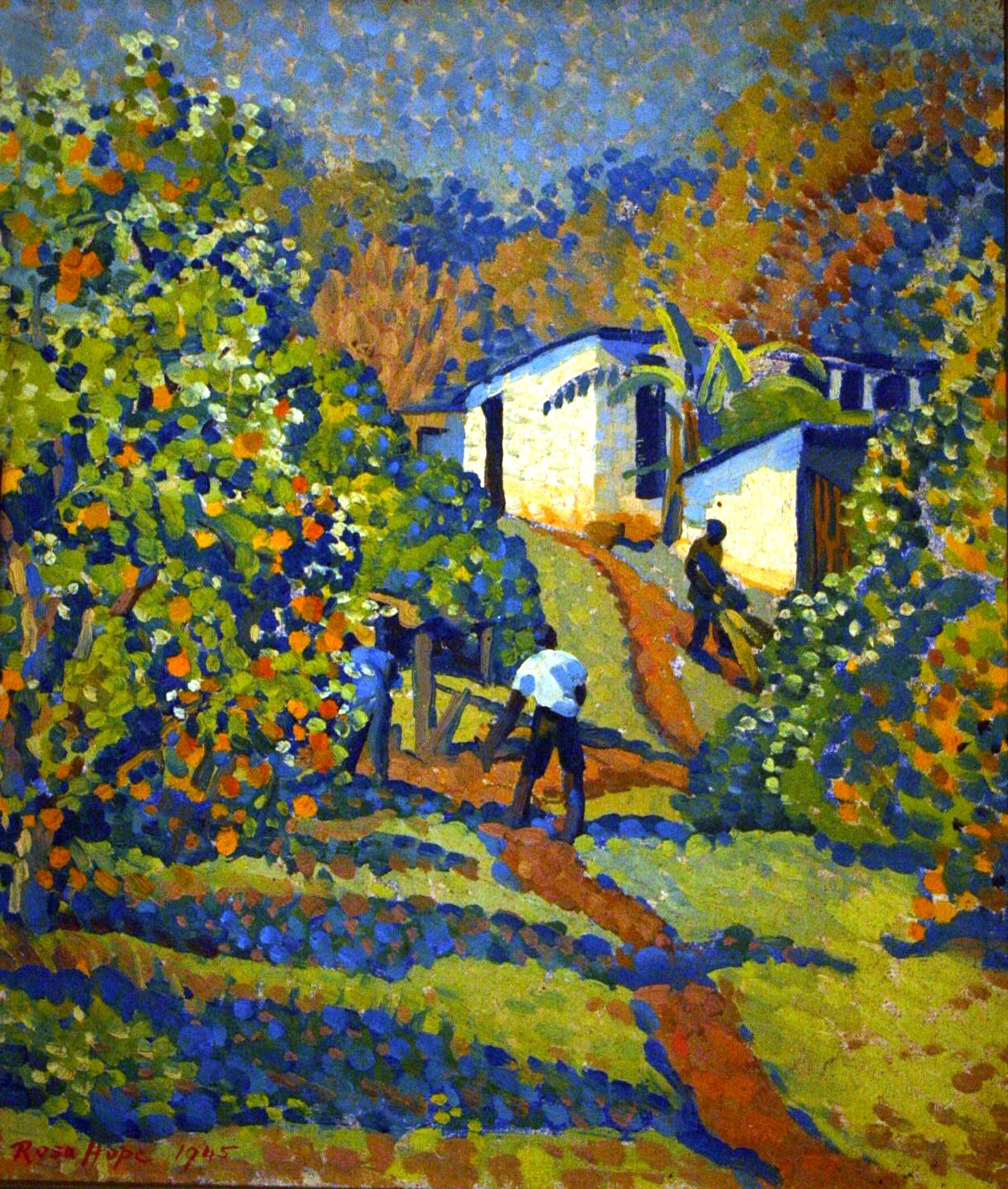
Orchard at Glenaholm, Pietermaritzburg 1945
