= Vivian van der Merwe =

Vivian Hubert van der Merwe
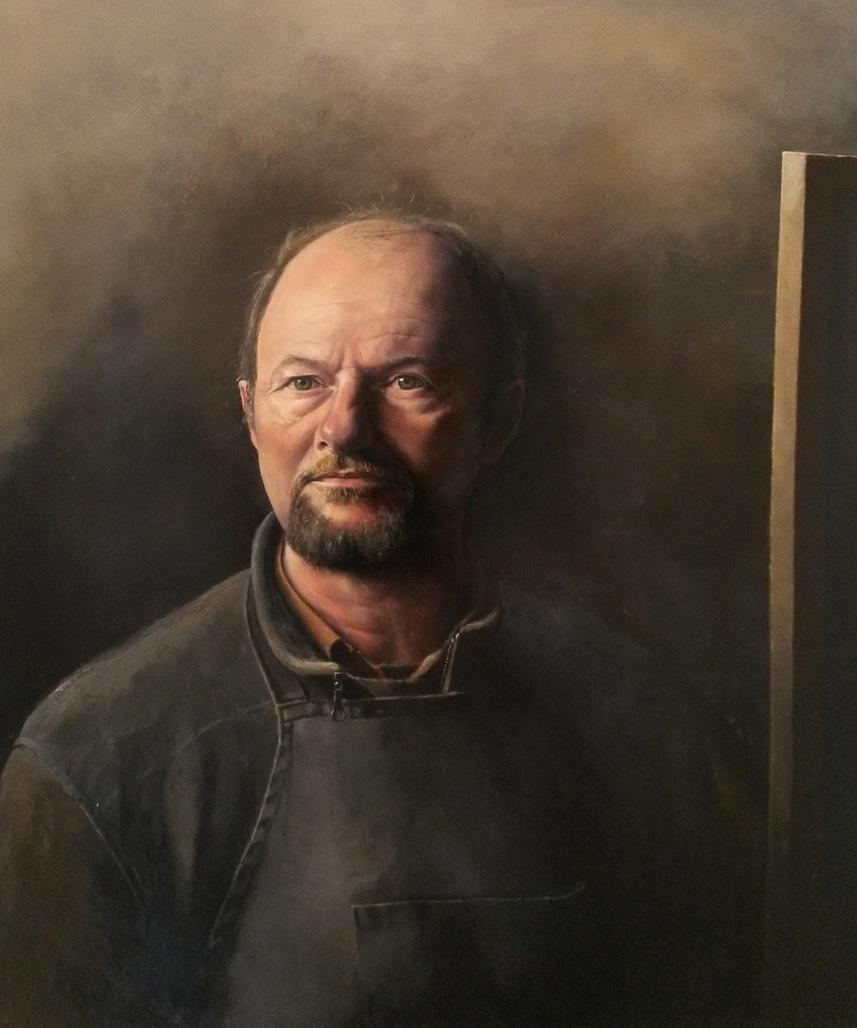
- Self-Portrait. Homage to my Dutch Ancestors (2014)
- Born: 1956 (age 69–70); Cape Town, South Africa
- Education: Michaelis School of Fine Art, University of Cape Town
- Known for: Painting

Vivian Hubert van der Merwe, born 1956, Cape Town, is a South African painter. His work typically investigates perception, materiality and visual form through a process-driven approach to the genres of still-life and abstract painting. Stylistically and conceptually his still-life practice has been likened with that of Giorgio Morandi and Euan Uglow.

== Early career and education ==
Van der Merwe's early work in the mid-1970s emerged through his engagement with the Rorke's Drift Studios, which prompted both stylistic experimentation and critical reflection on the role of political content in art. This period was followed by undergraduate and postgraduate study at the Michaelis School of Fine Art, where sustained exposure to Formalist theory and intensive research into the writings of Clive Bell helped establish the conceptual foundations that would continue to inform his later practice.

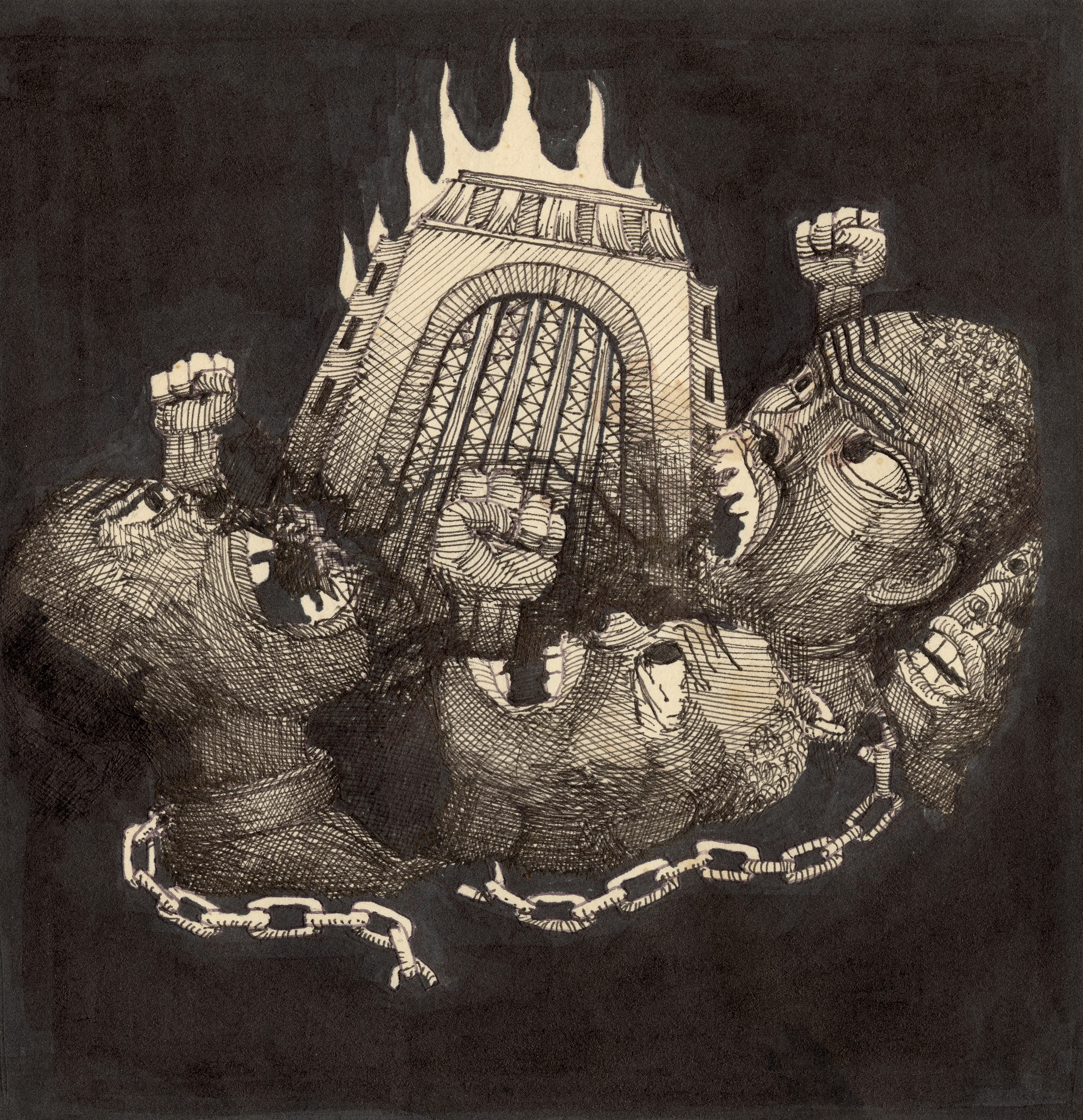
Freedom (1974), pen and ink on paper, 13 × 13 cm.

Among van der Merwe's earliest distinctive works were those conceived under the mentorship of Vuminkosi Zulu, resident artist at Rorke's Drift Art and Craft Centre in KwaZulu-Natal in the mid-1970s. He formed a close friendship with Zulu, whose influence is evident in the style, technique, and content of these early drawings. According to Liebenberg, although the works addressed injustices under Apartheid and were politically provocative, they also led van der Merwe to question the role of didacticism in art. By 1977 he had moved away from overtly political commentary in his practice.

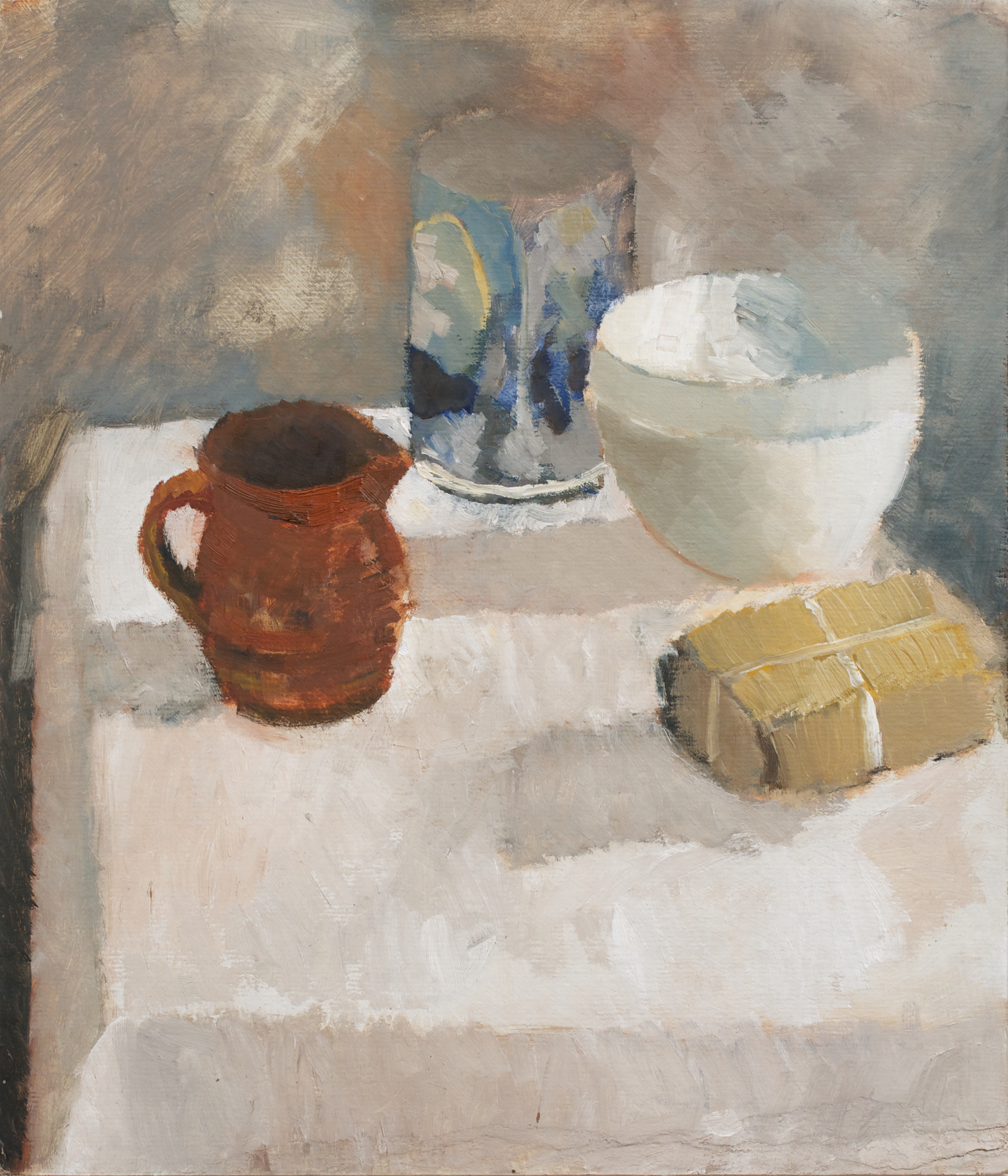
Still-life with Jug, Tea Caddy, Bowl & Wrapped Wax (1979), oil on prepared card, 36 × 31 cm.

From 1977 van der Merwe undertook undergraduate and postgraduate studies at the Michaelis School of Fine Art, completing his Master of Fine Art degree in 1984 under the tuition of Stanley Pinker. During this period, as recipient of the Jules Kramer Music and Fine Art Award and the Harry Crossley Bursary, he spent several months researching the unpublished texts of Formalist theorist Clive Bell in the British Museum in London, with the theories of Formalism becoming an abiding theme in his work.

== Mid-career ==
Throughout his career van der Merwe remained active as an educator at various South African institutions, including Nelson Mandela University and Stellenbosch University, retiring from full-time academia in 2012 to concentrate on his studio practice.

Van der Merwe's artistic practice has consistently centered on the concept of aesthetic form, a focus that extends from his postgraduate research to his later work. He engages critically with the long intellectual history of form in art, philosophy, theology, and science, and his paintings explore the possibility of recovering form beyond contemporary preoccupations with language and narrative. Although he avoids overtly political or narrative modes, his still-life works use formal experimentation to open reflective and moral possibilities within everyday experience.

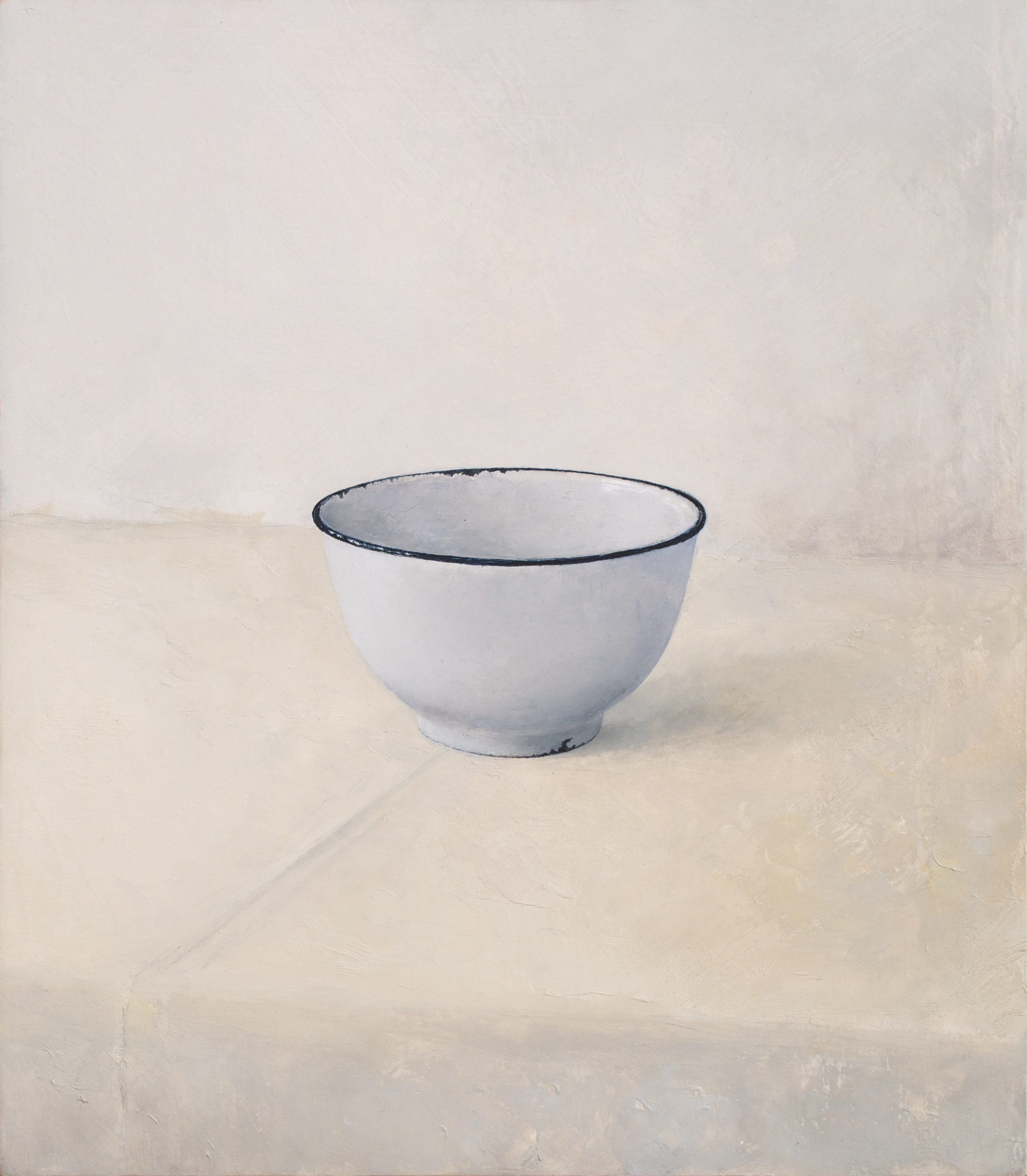
Study for Still-life with White Enamel Bowl (2006), oil on board, 27 × 23.5 cm.

== Platonic and Byzantine influences ==
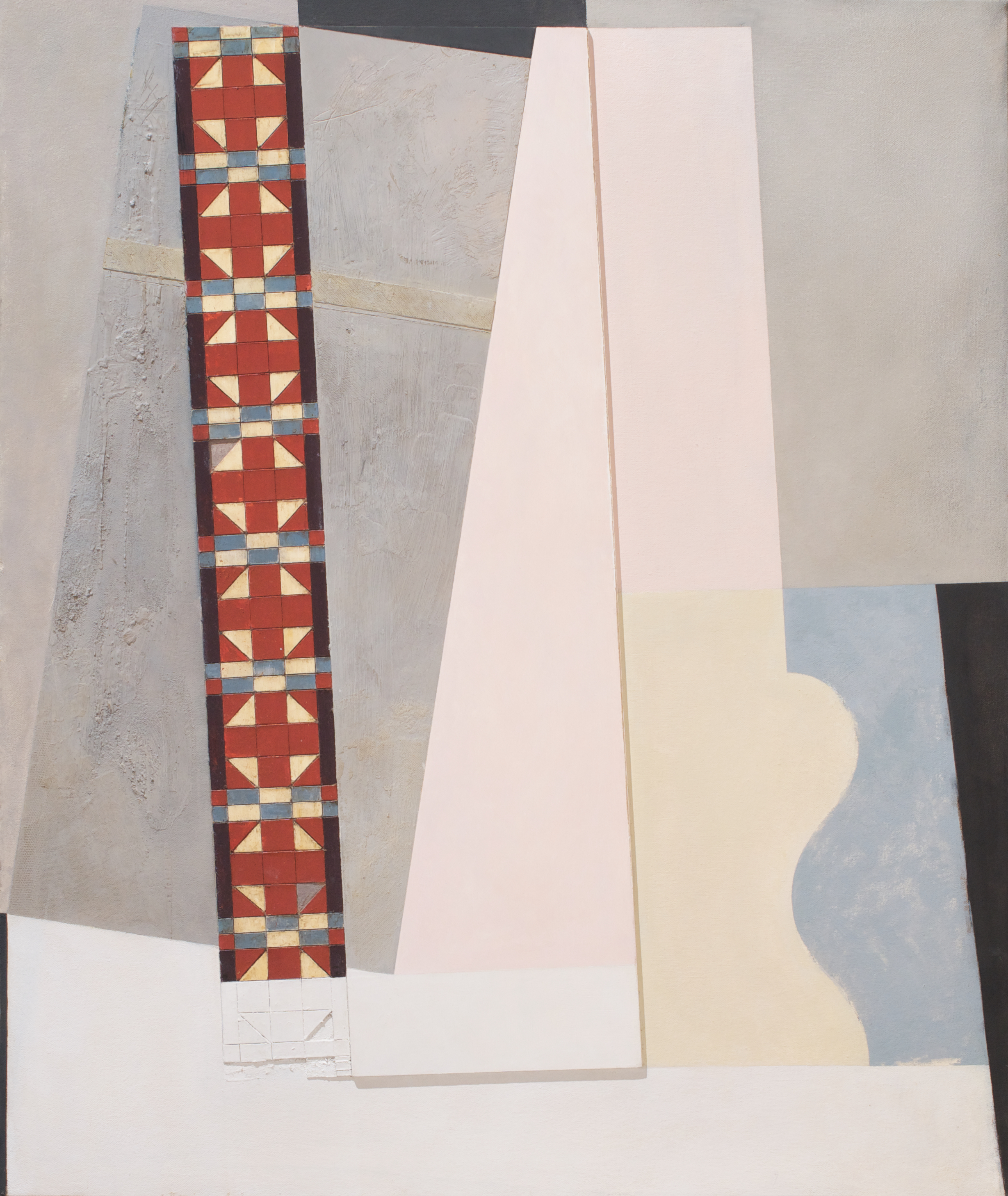
Composition with Byzantine Motif (2001), oil, wax encaustic and collage on canvas, 76 × 63.5 cm.

Drawing on a 2005 interview conducted by Jane Commin, Pimsner notes that van der Merwe regards his work as shaped by, and paying homage to, Byzantine art. She explains that Byzantine visual culture sought to convey theological meaning by representing underlying ideas rather than the physical world itself, raising questions about how images can truthfully depict what they claim to represent. Pimsner suggests that these concerns help illuminate the contemplative or spiritual qualities evident in the sensibilities of still-life painters such as van der Merwe and Giorgio Morandi.

== Later career ==
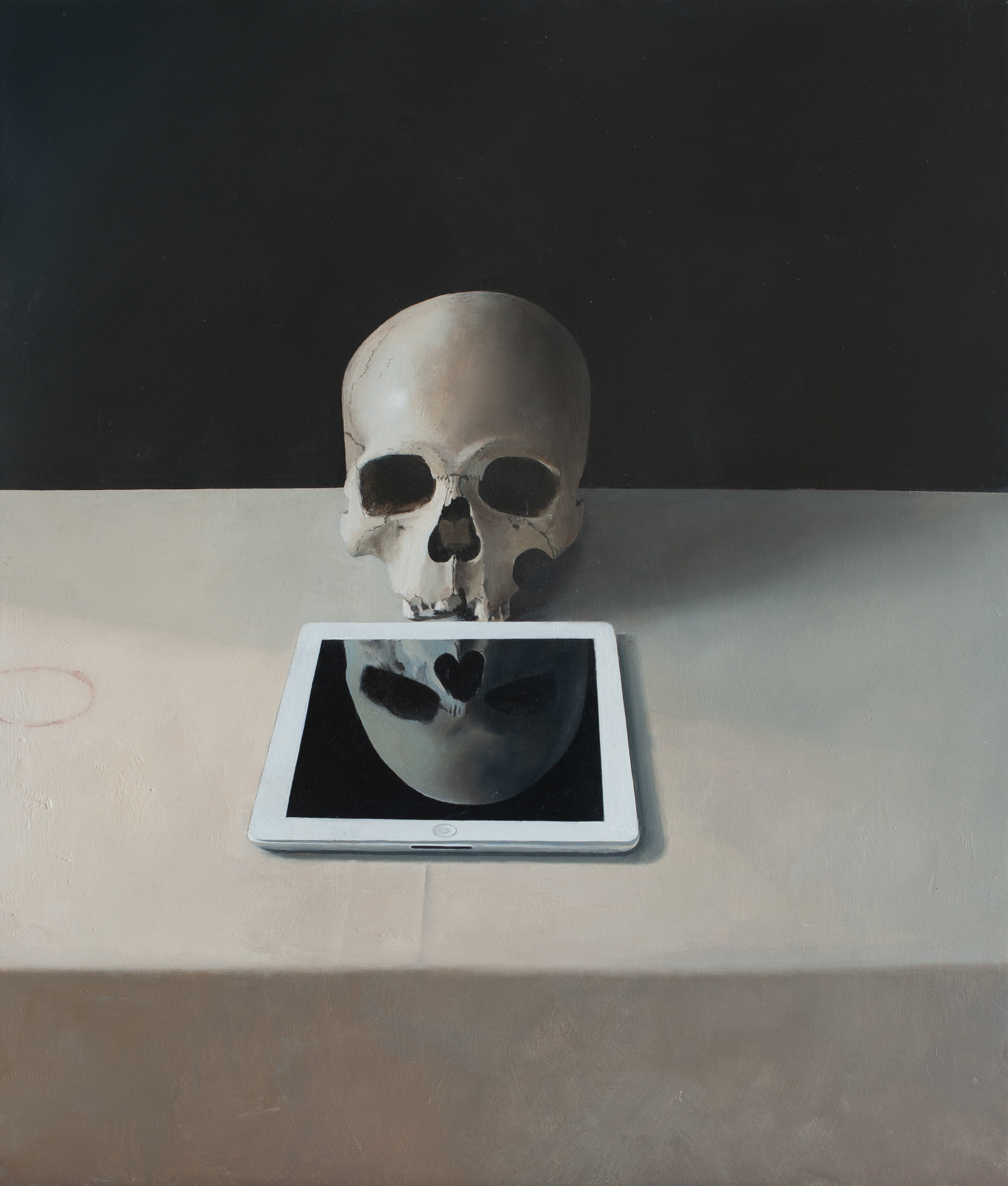
Vanitas, Still-life with iPad and Skull (2020), oil on board, 47 × 40 cm.

In 2012 Van der Merwe retired from full-time academia and has continued working from his studio in Stellenbosch.

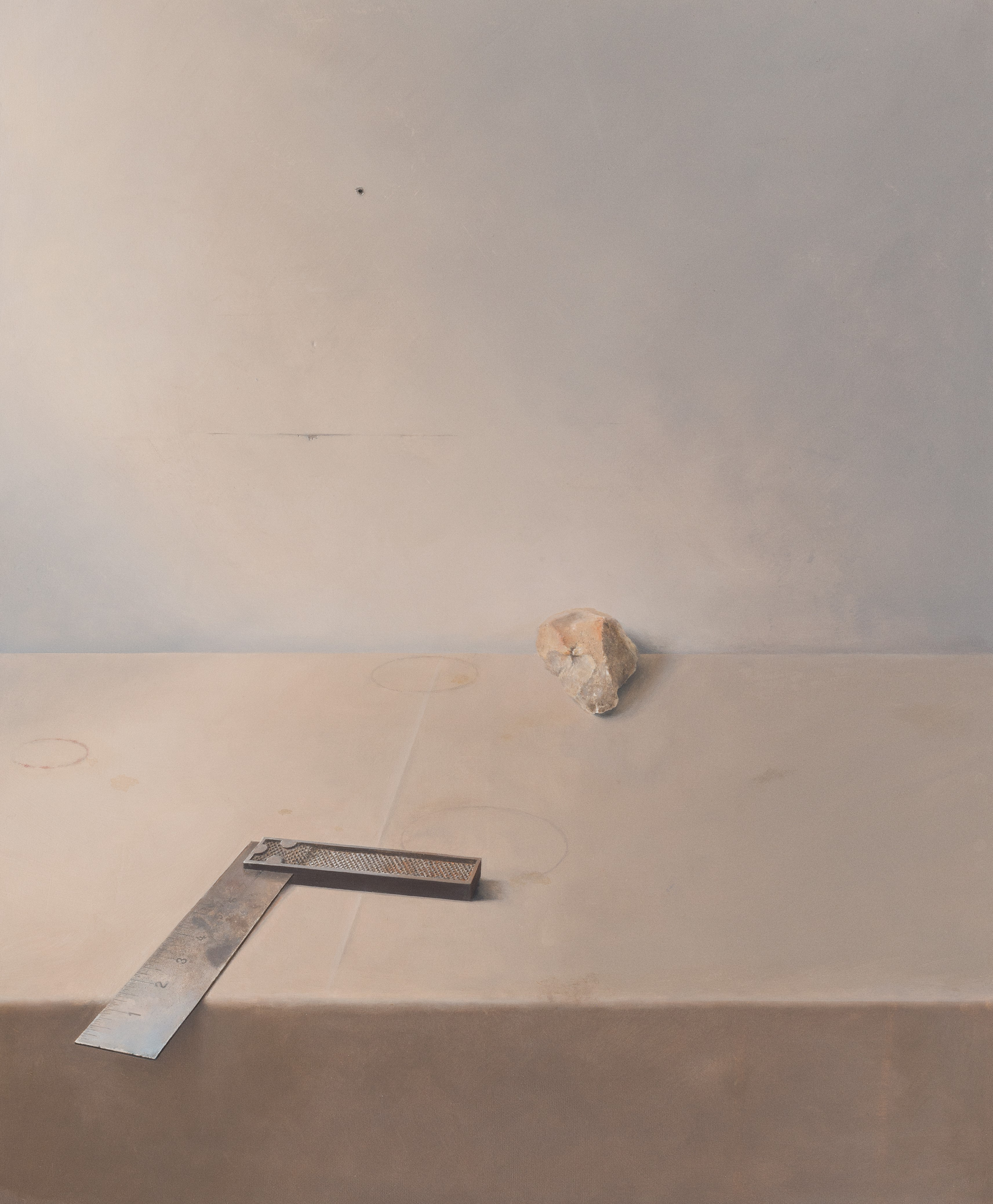
Still-life with British Square and Kromme-River Hand Axe (2023), oil on board, 60 × 50 cm.

== Literature ==
Art historian Michael Godby situates van der Merwe's practice within the broader development of South African still-life, noting its engagement with continuity and change in the genre.

Deon Liebenberg's in-depth article, "Painting Beyond Language: The Art and Aesthetics of Vivian van der Merwe" (2023). This study provides an extensive overview of van der Merwe's career, examining his work through the lens of phenomenology, embodiment, and the limits of linguistic interpretation. Liebenberg's analysis spans early, mid-career, and recent paintings, offering one of the most comprehensive academic accounts of van der Merwe's oeuvre.

Philosopher Bert Olivier has also written on van der Merwe's work. In A Selection of Eastern Cape Art (1994), Olivier discusses van der Merwe's early paintings within a regional and thematic context, situating them among emerging Eastern Cape artists of the period.

== Exhibitions and collections ==
Vivian van der Merwe has participated and numerous solo and group exhibitions since 1979 and his work is represented in private, corporate art and public collections in South Africa and internationally.
