= Kill the Lights =

Kill the Lights may refer to:

== Art ==
- Kill the Lights!, a 2009 oil painting by Matthew Hindley

== Music ==
=== Musicians ===
- Kill the Lights (band), a British and American metalcore band

=== Albums ===
- Kill the Lights (Tony Molina album), 2018
- Kill the Lights (Luke Bryan album), 2015 (or its title song, see below)
  - Kill the Lights Tour, a 2016 tour by Bryan to support the album
- Kill the Lights (The New Cities album), 2011
- Kill the Lights (Lowercase album), 1997

=== Songs ===
- "Kill the Lights" (Alex Newell, DJ Cassidy and Nile Rodgers song), 2016
- "Kill the Lights" (Britney Spears song), 2008
- "Kill the Lights", a 1999 song by Rancid, appearing on the 2008 album B Sides and C Sides
- "Kill the Lights", a 2006 song by Mojave 3 from Puzzles Like You
- "Kill the Lights", a 2007 song by The Birthday Massacre from Walking with Strangers
- "Kill the Lights", a 2010 song by David Usher from The Mile End Sessions
- "Kill the Lights", a 2010 song by Ryan Adams from the album III/IV
- "Kill the Lights", a 2012 song by Set It Off
- "Kill the Lights", a 2012 song by The-Dream, released ahead of the album IV Play
- "Kill the Lights", a 2013 song by Matt Nathanson from Last of the Great Pretenders
- "Kill the Lights", a 2013 song by Silverstein from This Is How the Wind Shifts
- "Kill the Lights", a 2014 song by Luke Bryan from Kill the Lights
- "Kill the Lights", a 2014 song by Radio Killer
- "Kill the Lights", a 2015 song by Abraham Mateo from AM

== See also ==
- "Kill the Light", a song by Kitten from the album Sunday School
- "Kill the Light", a song by Lacuna Coil from the album Dark Adrenaline
- "Kill the Light", a song by Lost Society from the album Hell Is a State of Mind
