= Willie Bester =

South African artist

Willie Bester (born February 29, 1956) is a South African painter, sculptor and collage artist. He is best known for his role in the protesting of the apartheid system through his artwork. He currently lives in Kuilsrivier, South Africa with his wife, Evelyn and their three children.

== Life of Willie Bester. ==
Bester was born in Montagu, Western Cape, a town located in the Western Cape province of South Africa about 180 km east from Cape Town. His father was Xhosa and his mother was classified Coloured under the apartheid system. He was born before they were married and was therefore categorized as Coloured, taking his mother's name.

During childhood, Bester showed a natural talent for art. He was known to create and sell toy cars and animals from wire, creating headlights from candles and discarded tin cans. He won an interschool art competition after encouragement from a school teacher who recognized his interest in painting. However, with his parents categorized as a mixed-race relationship, Bester faced many challenges growing up. They were denied housing in “Coloured” neighborhoods of Montagu, while the only lodging for Black workers were single-sex hostels. In order to live together as a family within the township, they often lived in other people's backyards. At this time, there was very little organized resistance to apartheid. His mother's family rejected Bester and his siblings because their father was a black Xhosa-speaking man, rather than an Afrikaans-speaking “Coloured” person. Bester also bore witness to the constant harassment of his Black father by police and the farming communities in Montagu.

In his late teens, Bester, like many townships and rural youth in similar situations joined the South African Defence Force. He spent a year there, and another in a military camp for unemployed black youth. He later became a dental assistant. During the 1980s, resistance movements like the Soweto Uprising inspired Bester, who returned to his childhood interest in art by joining the Community Arts Program in Cape Town at the age of thirty.

== Work ==
Bester works in a variety of mediums, such as paint, photography and sculpture. He is most notable for his mixed-media pieces using collage and paint. His use of found objects in collage to represent the real world have been compared to Pablo Picasso and Synthetic Cubism, rubbish collages by Kurt Schwitters and early Pop Art works by Robert Rauchenberg.(-:

Much of his subject matter is reflective to the history of apartheid, both in townships and his own personal accounts. He is also known for using the human form as a narrative tool, compared to artists like Jackson Hlungwani and Andries Botha. Bester has been noted as one of the strongest opponents to apartheid, creating much resistance art to garner protest from other South Africans.

=== During Apartheid ===
Upon joining the Community Arts Project in 1986 as a part-time art student, Bester was surrounded by South Africans who openly attacked the apartheid system, which was highly unusual at the time. This inspired his first two mixed-media pieces, “Forced Removal” and “Don't Vote”. During his four years in CAP, Bester began to work bigger and experiment with spatial structure and photography.

The subject matter he depicted in his works were of the communities oppressed under apartheid. Bester often used the human body as a vehicle of narration, especially in works depicting individuals. In his work Tribute to Chris Hani, Bester responds to the assassination of Chris Hani, then-president of the South African Communist Party in 1993, who played a large role in the anti-apartheid movement. In these works, he not only brings attention to the accomplishments of the individual, but also the unjust actions of the National Party. He has also used his works to express his own personal reactions to these events—in the case of Tribute to Chris Hani, he expresses his anger at the violence through the burnt state of wood in the center of the piece.

Bester also is conscious of the materials and their placement in his pieces. Often, his collection of found objects are discarded refuse from townships, which are then assembled to represent life and settings within townships. In his work Migrant Laborer’ he uses the life Semezaki, a retired migrant worker in the township of Crossroads, to show the life experiences of all migrant laborers under apartheid. The bed coils in front of a figure double as a jail cell, highlighting how Semezaki, like many others, were often apart from their families, supporting them with jobs they find in townships. Within this same piece, he also includes the image of a bible physically connected with a replication of Semezaki's passbook, to highlight the irony of the National Party's claims of being run on Christian principles. He revisits this in his work Die Bybel. Migrant workers like Semezaki were required to carry their passbook in order to work in a township until the Pass laws were repealed in 1986. Even after they were repealed, Semezaki continued to carry his passbook until he was killed by gangsters, one month after the completion of ‘’Migrant Laborer’’ in 1993.

Bester is noted for using oil paint for these portrait-like pieces, which has a long history in European portraiture, to restore human dignity to the Black and Coloured people he portrays. As his work evolved, Bester moved away from addressing the impact of apartheid laws, to celebrating the indomitable spirit of the oppressed people he paints.

In 1992, he received the French Prix de l’Aigle for most original work.

=== Post-Apartheid ===
Bester has continued to produce works, continuing to advocate for human rights and humanity in the wake of apartheid. He has received an Honorary medal for the promotion of Fine Arts from Suid-Afrikaanse Akademie vir Wetenskap en Kuns, as well as Order of Ikhamanga in Silver awarded by the South African government.

In April 2019, Bester was awarded an honorary doctorate by the University of KwaZulu-Natal for his contribution towards the protest of apartheid.

=== Sara Baartman Controversy ===
In 2017, the University of Cape Town responded to artworks on display being defaced during student protests by taking them down or covering them on grounds of vulnerability to damage, including Bester's piece ‘’Sara Baartman’’. Though some see Bester's use of Sara Baartman's image as a reclamation from a biased European viewpoint, protesting students claim that displaying it in the university has the potential to reinforce negative racial and sexual biases that linger from apartheid.

== Exhibitions ==
=== Solo exhibitions (selection) ===
- 1982 Forum, Cavendish Square, Cape Town.
- 1991 Gallery International, Cape Town
- 1992 Goodman Gallery, Johannesburg
- 1993 South African Association of Art, Cape Town
- 1994 Goodman Gallery, Johannesburg
- 1998 Emporain, Dakar
- 1999 Opere Recenti, Studio d'Arte Raffaelli, Trento, Italy
- 1999 Archivio Della Scuola Romana, Introdotto da Achille Bonito Oliva, Roma, Italy
- 2000 Arte Assortite, Torino
- 2001 Centre D'Art Contemporain, Brussels, Belgium
- 2002 SASOL Museum, Stellenbosch
- 2003 Association for Visual Arts, Cape Town
- 2005 34 LONG, Cape Town
- 2007 Montagu Museum
- 2008 Iziko South African National Gallery, Cape Town
- 2009 Goodman Gallery, Johannesburg

=== Group exhibitions (selection) ===
- 1989 Baxter Gallery, Cape Town
- 1990 Gallery International, Cape Town
- 1991 Operation Hunger Exhibition, Cape Town
- 1991–92 ZABALAZA FESTIVAL, Museum of Modern Art, Oxford
- 1992 Primart Gallery, Cape Town
- 1993 Venice Biennale, INCROCI DEL SUD: An exhibition of works by 27 contemporary South African Artists
- 1993–94 INCROCI DEL SUD, Stedelijk Museum, Amsterdam
- 1994 UN ART CONTEMPORIAN D'AFRIQUE DU SUD, Galerie De L'Esplanade, La Defence, Paris
- 1995 DIALOGUES OF PEACE, Exhibition for the UN's 50th Anniversary, Palaise Des Nations, Geneva
- 1996 Basel Art Fair, Basel, Switzerland
- 1996 Contemporary Art from South Africa, Haus der Kulturen der Welt, Berlin
- 1997 Galleria d'Art Moderna e Contemporanea di San Marino, San Marino
- 1998 Biennale de l'Art Contemporian, Dakar, Senegal
- 1999 Claiming Art Reclaiming Space, National Museum of African Art, Washington DC.
- 2000 Aldrich Museum of Contemporary Art, New York
- 2001 Barcelona Contemporary Cultural Center, Spain
- 2002 Passport to South Africa, Centro Culturale "Trevi", Bolzano, Italy
- 2003 Suidoos Festival, Peninsula Technikon 'Coexistence- Contemporary Cultural Production in South African' Rose Art Museum, USA
- 2004 Africa Remix - Düsseldorf, Museum Kunst Palast: 24 July–7 November 2004
- 2005 London, Hayward Gallery
- 2006 Tokyo, Mori Art Museum
- 2007 Rocca di Castagnoli, Biennale Internazionale d'Art, Italy
- 2009 34 LONG FINE ART, Cape Town

== Literature ==
- House, Gloria, Alison Kenzie,.und Art Gallery of Windsor. Willie Bester: apartheid laboratory : Art Gallery of Windsor, February 24-June 17, 2007. Art Gallery of Windsor, 2008.
- Lee, Donvé. Willie Bester: Art as a Weapon. Awareness Publishing, 2008...
