= Matthew Hindley =

South African artist

- Born: 1974; Cape Town, South Africa
- Died: 10 October 2025 (aged 50–51); Cape Town
- Education: Michaelis School of Fine Art
- Known for: Painting, drawing, new media, video art

Matthew Hindley (born 1974, Cape Town, South Africa) is a South African painter. He graduated from the Michaelis School of Fine Art, Cape Town in 2002, where he was awarded the Michaelis Prize.

As one of the country's most recognized younger painters, Hindley’s intense, poetic and delving artworks have featured in various critical and seminal South African exhibitions. Recent solo presentations have included An Everlasting Once at Brundyn + Gonsalves, Cape Town (2011) and Twilight of the Idols at Biksady, Budapest (2013). Hindley’s exhibition of drawings at David Krut Cape Town coincided with the official launch of the book, The Five Magic Pebbles & other stories. His notable solo painting presentation Resurrection (Der Brennende Wald) was held at Everard Read Cape Town gallery, in October 2015.

In addition, he has presented at the world renowned Eli and Edythe Broad Museum, Michigan (2012) and the Kochi Muziris Biennale, India (2012). In 2014 he worked on a series of paintings inspired by the mythological African tales of South African writer Don Mattera, for a book published by Rhodeworks, in Berlin, Germany. In 2015 his artwork was part of the imago mundi, Benetton Collection at the Venice Biennale, and his major public sculpture Speak Naturally and Continuously was installed above the entrance of the South African National Gallery in Cape Town, South Africa. This artwork was rebuilt in late 2018/ early 2019 and reopened to the general public interaction May 2019.

== Education ==
- 2002 – Bachelor of Fine Arts, University of Cape Town, Cape Town, South Africa

== Images ==
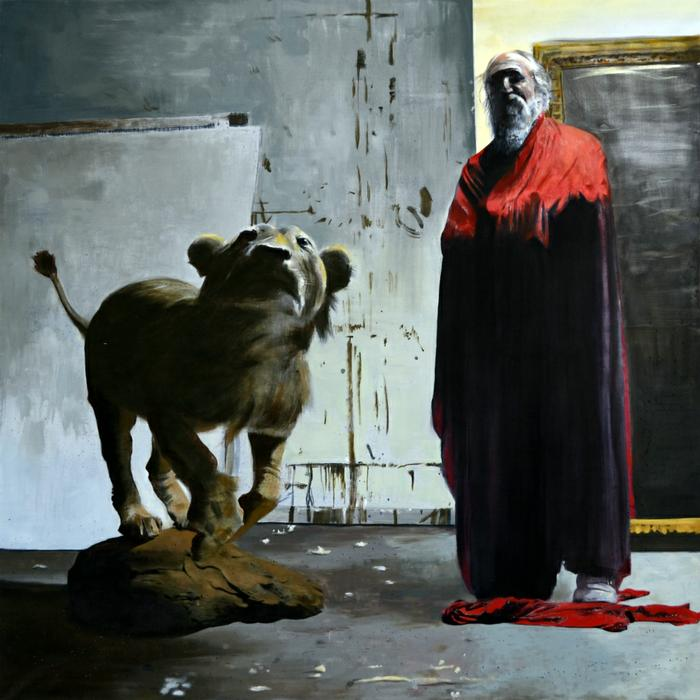
The Real Inspector, Oil on Linen, 200 x 200 cm, 2011

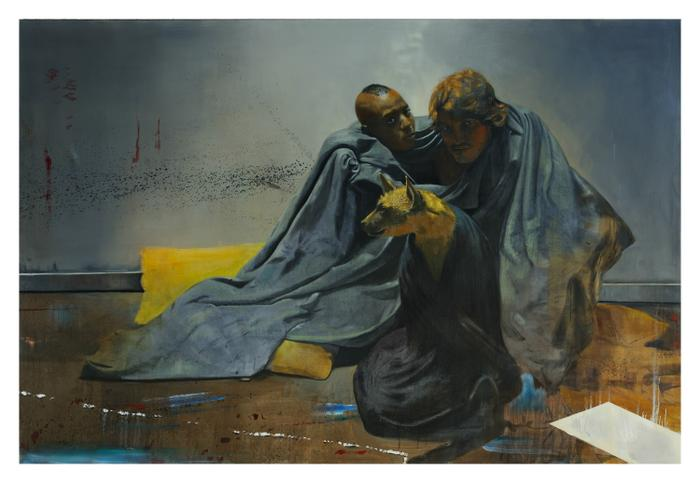
An Everlasting Once, Oil on Linen, 300 x 200 cm, 2011

Kill the Lights!, Oil on Canvas, 300 x 200 cm, 2009

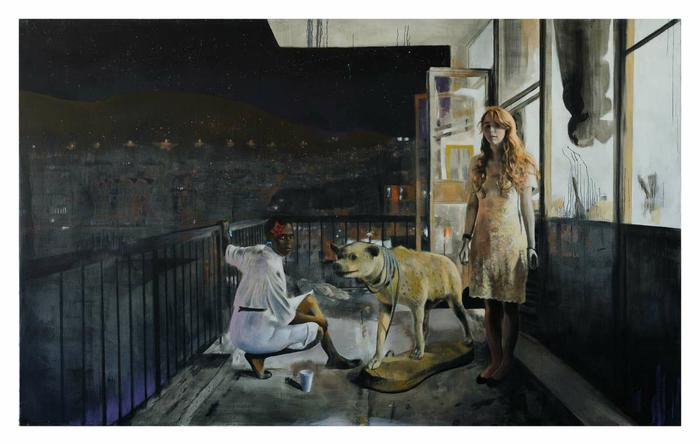
The End of the World, Oil on Linen, 300 x 200 cm, 2010

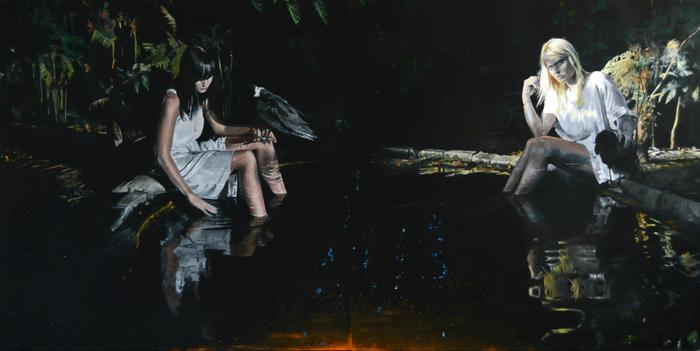
Diamond Diamond, Shinin' Shinin', (Dyptych) Oil on Linen, 2 x 200 x 200 cm, 2011

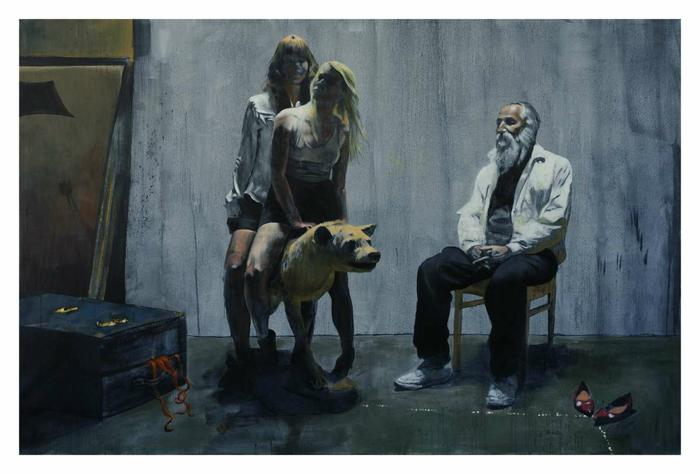
The Ache of Marriage, Oil on Linen, 300 x 200 cm, 2010

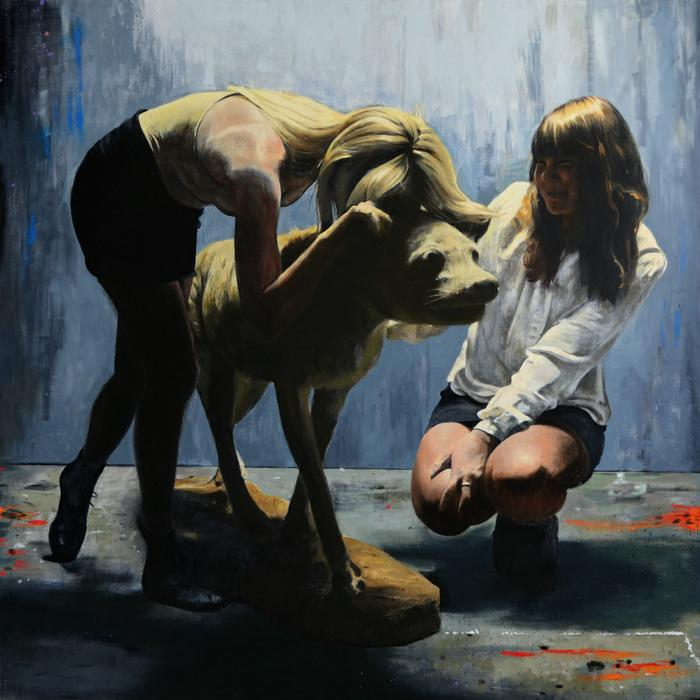
The Waking Spell, Oil on Linen, 2011, 2m x 2m

== Selected solo exhibitions ==
2019 The Brush Itself Incites, Vault Gallery, Silo Hotel, Cape Town, South Africa

2018 The Divided Self, Everard Read, Cape Town, South Africa

2018 Survey of Risk, David Krut, Johannesburg, South Africa

2015 Resurrection (Der Brennende Wald), Everard Read, Cape Town, South Africa

2013 Twilight of the Idols, Biksady Galeria, Budapest, Hungary

2012 Volta 8, Basel, Switzerland, BRUNDYN + GONSALVES, Cape Town

2011 The Solo Project, Basel, Switzerland / An Everlasting once, BRUNDYN + GONSALVES (Formerly iArt Gallery), Cape Town, South Africa

2007 Private Vernissage, Berlin, Germany, with Kromschroeder & Pfannenschmidt

2006 Before My Time, 34LONG, Cape Town

2005 Speak Naturally & Continuously, Iziko South African National Gallery, Cape Town / Absolute Chop, ( Art-Directed by Zwelethu Mthethwa ), Mzoli’s Butchery and Grill, Gugulethu

2004 Untitled, Klein Karoo National Arts Festival, Oudtshoorn / Surrender, Bell-Roberts Gallery, Cape Town

2003 Infra-Red, The Michaelis Gallery, Cape Town, South Africa Angostura Dam (U.S.)
