= Julia Rosa Clark =

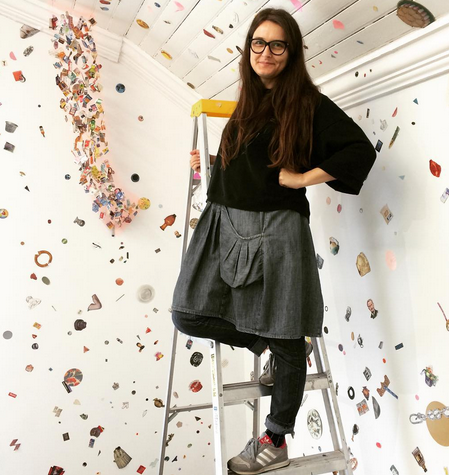
- Photograph of the artist at Whatiftheworld Gallery, Cape Town, 2015
- Born: 24 August 1975 (age 51); Cape Town, South Africa
- Education: Michaelis School of Fine Art, Cape Town
- Known for: Painting

Julia Rosa Clark (born 1975) is a South African contemporary artist and educator known for her "graphically complex, textually coded and colour-rich paper installations."

== Early life and education ==
Clark was born in Cape Town, South Africa in 1975. She graduated with a Master of Fine Art Degree from the Michaelis School of Fine Art, University of Cape Town in 2004.

== Work ==
Clark has worked as an artist and curator, and has been featured in international exhibitions with works that range from lit-up suitcases to clothing to large wall installations. Her exhibits use the gallery floor, walls and ceiling as a canvas for her art. Often using found objects, her materials include children's toys, old boxes and paper cutouts. Clark describes her work altering these objects as a "device for coping with an overload of information or emotion". Her 2004-2005 exhibition, A Million Trillion Gazillion, used various elements to explore the "changing nature of knowledge systems." With the help of other art students, Clark influenced traditional educational materials as illustrated books to portray the "in-congruence of an idealized world view with the failure and realities of our contemporary world." Three of her solo exhibitions act as a trilogy, looking into the fleeting nature of knowledge systems.

Another exhibition, Hypocrite's Lament (2007) focused on "response cycles of addition and destruction", (2007). Her following exhibition, Fever Jubilee (2010) focused on growth, with plants made of paper cut-outs that acted as a space for Clark and her family to relax with the audience. The final piece of the trilogy focused directly on science and education, featuring installations that allude to concepts in physics and philosophy.

In addition to her solo exhibitions, Clark has been featured in numerous group exhibitions and collaborations. She has also curated and co-curated numerous shows including Big Wednesday (2008) and Sing into my Mouth (2009) at the whatiftheworld gallery in Woodstock, Cape Town.

== Teaching ==
Clark lectures at numerous South African universities. Clark has taught at her alma mater Michaelis School of Fine Art in Cape Town a variety of classes including lower and upper-level print-media, painting and drawing classes. She has also acted as a lecturer at the University of Stellenbosch, Cape Town School of Photography, Cape Peninsula University of Technology, and other art specialized high-schools. She is currently the programme coordinator of the Bachelor of Arts in Contemporary Art at the Cape Town Creative Academy, a role she has held since 2017.

== Solo exhibitions ==
- Two works, whatiftheworld gallery, Cape Town (2015)
- Booty whatiftheworld gallery, Cape Town (2012)
- Booty – a selection, whatiftheworld gallery: Volta 8 Art Fair, Basel, Switzerland (2012)
- Paradise Apparatus whatiftheworld gallery, Cape Town (2010)
- Hypocrite's Lament Ferreira Projects, London (2008)
- Hypocrite's Lament whatiftheworld gallery, Joburg Art Fair (2008)
- Fever Jubilee blank projects, Cape Town (2007)
- Hypocrite's Lament João Ferreira Gallery, Cape Town (2007)
- Lalaland MTN New Contemporaries Johannesburg Art Gallery (2006)
- A Million Trillion Gazillion João Ferreira Gallery, Liste 05, Basel, Switzerland (2005)
- A Million Trillion Gazillion João Ferreira Gallery, Cape Town (2004)
- I Want To Carry Everything With Me, For Always Michaelis School of Fine Art & IDASA Spin Street Gallery (1997)

== Awards and residencies ==
- Finalist in MTN New Contemporary (2005)
- Wasla Workshop Residency, Nuweiba Egypt (2003) (Triangle Arts Trust)
- Glasgow School of Fine Art Exchange (1995)
