= Nandipha Mntambo =

South African artist (born 1982)

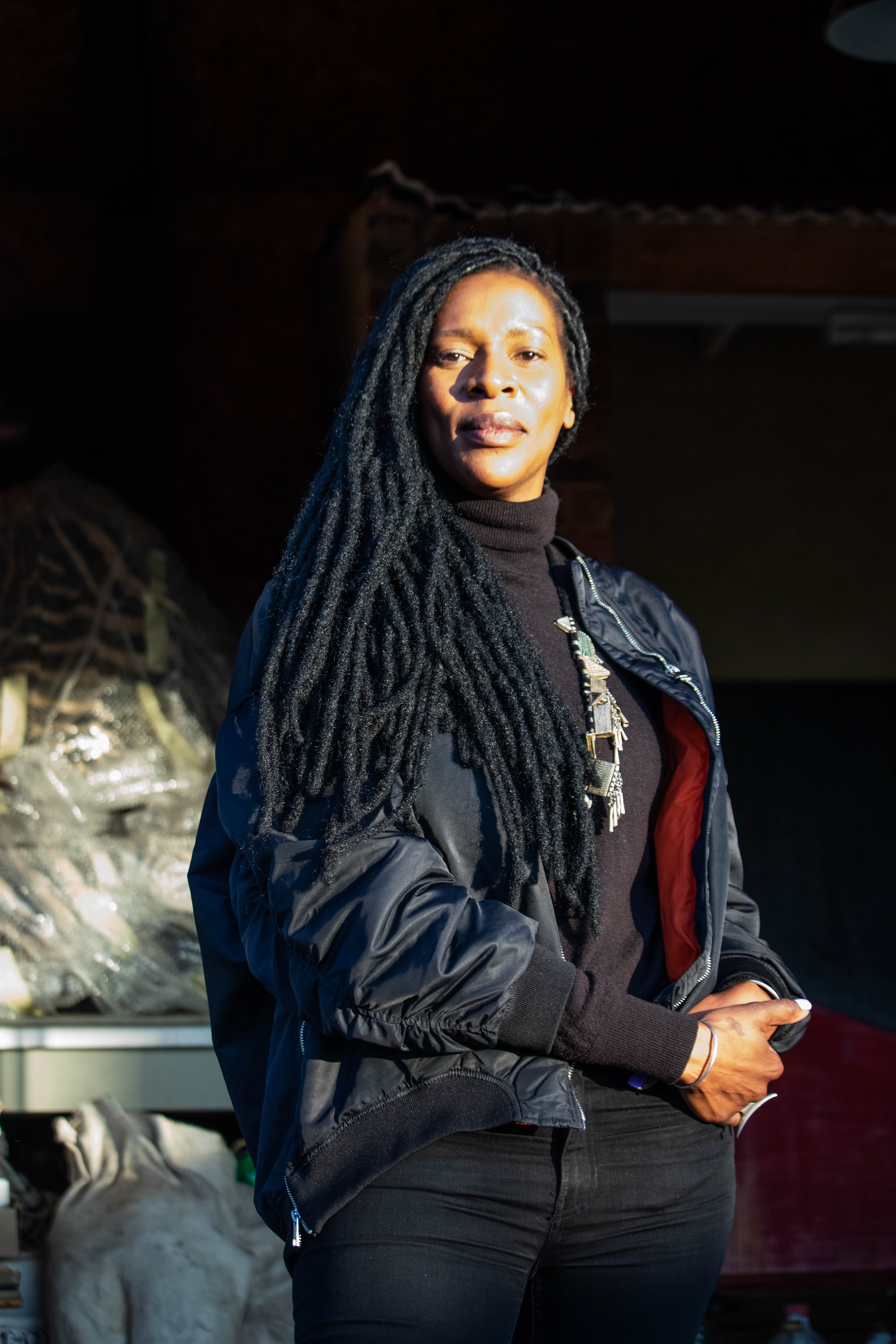
- Born: 1 January 1982 (age 44); Mbabane
- Occupations: Photographer, Sculptor, Television producer

Nandipha Mntambo (born 1982) is a South African artist who has become famous for her sculptures, videos and photographs that focus on human female body and identity by using natural, organic materials. Her art style has been self described as eclectic and androgynous. She is best known for her cowhide sculptures that connects the human form to nature.

== Life and education ==
Nandipha Mntambo was born in Swaziland, Southern Africa, in 1982. Growing up, her father was a Methodist pastor and later became a bishop. His occupation allowed her family to live in white neighbourhoods during apartheid, an aspect of her life that serves as an influence for her art and identity as an artist. Prior to her career in art, her first choice was to study medicine. Mntambo was originally inspired to pursue a career in forensic pathology after coming home to her family dogs being killed by a stalker, but the sight of "dead bodies" proved to be overwhelming. She graduated with a master's degree in Fine Art (with distinction) from the Michaelis School of Fine Art at the University of Cape Town, in June 2007. She currently lives and works in Johannesburg, South Africa, with her daughter.

== Work and career ==
=== Sculptural practice ===
In her work, Mntambo focuses on the human body and the organic nature of identity, using mainly natural materials and experimenting with sculptures, videos and photography. One of her favorite materials to use in her pieces is the hide of the cow, often also used as a covering for human bodies – boneless sculptures – and thus oscillating between evoking the garments that can be shed at will and the bodies that once contained living, breathing, masticating beings with four stomachs. The idea to work with cowhide first came to her in a dream, and her interest later blossomed as she wanted to study the hide to learn more about its chemical processes. Because of that, she worked with a taxidermist to better understand how to tan hides. Mntambo embraces this ambiguity and likes to play with the tension between the sightly and the unsightly by manipulating how her viewers negotiate the two aspects of the hide.

While she uses her own body as the mould for these sculptures, she does not intend to make an explicit statement regarding femininity. Rather, Mntambo uses these hides to explore the division between animals and humans, as well as the divide between attraction and repulsion. This aspect of her work has influenced her perception of contemporary South African women by allowing her to think differently about body hair on women and became curious as to how viewers would interpret a completely hairy female form. Through her art, Mntambo challenges traditional and nontraditional gender roles and identity, disrupting the boundaries between "human and animal, femininity and masculinity, attraction and repulsion, and life and death." She has stated:

"My intention is to explore the physical and tactile properties of hide and aspects of control that allow or prevent me from manipulating this material in the context of the female body and contemporary art. I have used cowhide as a means to subvert expected associations with corporeal presence, femininity, sexuality and vulnerability. The work I create seeks to challenge and subvert preconceptions regarding representation of the female body." "Themes of confrontation, protection and refuge play out particularly in relation to inner conflicts and to notions of self-love/hatred. The bronze, Sengifikile, uses my own features as a foundation, but takes on the guise of a bull. Referencing the head-and-shoulder busts of the Renaissance tradition I challenge male and female roles in society and expected associations with femininity, sexuality and vulnerability."

=== Photography and film ===
In the context of her photography, Mntambo is heavily inspired by mythology and the idea of an animal-human species. She often places herself as the subject of her photos along with others and has stated that she finds it difficult to accurately represent her photographed subjects as real. It sometimes made her uncomfortable to face what she likes and does not like about herself in her digitally altered photographs.

Mntambo's film and performance piece Ukungenisa (2008) is a nine minute video portraying the artist as a bullfighter in an abandoned bullfighting arena in Mozambique; This is one of the few performances she has produced in her career. The primary theme of this self-dedicated production was for her to figure out how to become the fighter, animal, and audience all at once. The research she conducted ahead of this display consisted of trips to Spain and Portugal in the hopes of shadowing bullfighters; however, her experience did not go as planned and she hired a choreographer to guide her performance. She has stated that she views all of her artwork thus far as continuous and interconnected.

== Exhibitions ==
=== Solo exhibitions ===
- 2023 | Chimera, Everard Read, Johannesburg, South Africa
- 2022 | Agoodjie, Everard Read, Cape Town, South Africa
- 2022 | Transcending Instinct, Southern Guild, Cape Town, South Africa
- 2021 | Agoodjie, Everard Read, Johannesburg, South Africa
- 2019 | Isikhala, Andréhn-Schiptjenko, Paris
- 2017 | The snake you left inside me, Stevenson, Johannesburg, South Africa
- 2017 | Material Value, Zeitz Museum of Contemporary Art Africa, Cape Town, South Africa
- 2015 | Love and its companions, Andréhn-Schiptjenko, Stockholm, Sweden
- 2015 | Metamorphoses, Stevenson, Cape Town, South Africa
- 2014 | Transience, Stevenson, Johannesburg, South Africa
- 2013 | Nandipha Mntambo, Zeitz MOCAA Pavilion, V&A Waterfront, Cape Town, South Africa Nandipha Mntambo, Andrehn-Schiptjenko, Stockholm, Sweden
- 2012 | Faena, Oliewenhuis Art Museum, Bloemfontein; Standard Bank Gallery, Johannesburg; University of Potchefstroom Art Gallery, South Africa The Unspoken, Stevenson, Cape Town, South Africa
- 2011 | Faena, National Arts Festival, Grahamstown; Nelson Mandela Metropolitan Art Museum, Port Elizabeth; Iziko South African National Gallery, Cape Town; Durban Art Gallery, South Africa
- 2009 | Umphatsi Wemphi, Brodie/Stevenson, Johannesburg, South Africa
- 2009 | The Encounter, Michael Stevenson, Cape Town, South Africa
- 2007 | Ingabisa, Michael Stevenson, Cape Town, South Africa

=== Group exhibitions ===
- 2022 | Ozange, Contemporary Photography Bienalle, Malaga, Spain
- 2020 | Contemporary Female Identities in the Global South, Joburg Contemporary Art Foundation, South Africa. Matereality, Iziko South African National Gallery, Cape Town, South Africa.
- 2019 | Ngoma: Art and Cosmology, Johannesburg Art Gallery, South Africa.
- 2018 | City Deep, The Centre for the Less Good Idea, Johannesburg South Africa
- 2017 | Nandipha Mntambo and Per B Sundberg, Galerie Hervé van der Straeten, Paris, France
- 2016 | Dak’Art, 12th Dakar Biennale, Senegal - Disguise: Masks and Global African Art, Brooklyn Museum, New York, USA; Fowler Museum, UCLA School of the Arts and Architecture, Los Angeles, USA
- 2010 | PEEKABOO: Current South Africa, Tennis Palace Art Museum, Helsinki, Finland Ampersand, Daimler Contemporary, Berlin, Germany.
- 2010 | The Beauty of Distance: Song of survival in a precarious age, 17th Biennale of Sydney, Australia.
- 2010 | Space: Currencies in contemporary African art, Museum Africa, Newtown, Johannesburg, South Africa
- 2010 | Dak’Art, 9th Dakar Biennale, Senegal - Life Less Ordinary: Performance and display in South African art, Fotogallery, Cardiff, Wales The Good Old Days, Aarhus Art Building, Denmark
- 2010 | Hautnah: Hair in art and culture, Kunstverein Leonberg, Germany Toros! Works from the 19th, 20th and 21st centuries, Galerie Sophie Scheidecker, Paris, France She Devil, Studio Stefania Miscetti, Rome, Italy
- 2009 | Hautnah: Hair in art and culture, Museum Villa Rot, Burgrieden-Rot, Germany
- 2009 | Les Rencontres de Bamako biennial of African photography, Bamako, Mali
- 2009 | Life Less Ordinary: Performance and display in South African art, Djanogly Gallery, Nottingham, UK
- 2008 | Dak'art biennale, ifa Gallery, Berlin; Stuttgart, Germany
- 2008 | Number Two: Fragile, Julia Stoschek Collection, Düsseldorf, Germany Kuckei + Kuckei, Berlin, Germany. Beauty and Pleasure in South African Contemporary Art, The Stenersen Museum, Oslo, Norway

== Awards ==
- 2016: Creator Award | Glamour South Africa Women of the Year
- 2014: Shortlisted for the AIMIA | AGO Photography Prize (Canada)
- 2011: Standard Bank Young Artist for Visual Art
- 2010; Wits/BHP Billiton Fellowship
- 2005: Curatorial Fellowship, Brett Kebble Art Awards
- 2004: Mellon Meyers Fellowship, Michaelis School of Fine Art
- 2003: Mellon Meyers Fellowship, Michaelis School of Fine Art

== Literature ==
- Hansi Momodu-Gordon 9 Weeks Stevenson, 2016
- Nandipha Mntambo Standard Bank Young Artist 2011 special edition Stevenson, 2011
- Nandipha Mntambo Standard Bank Young Artist 2011 Stevenson, 2011
- Mntambo, Nandipha, Sophie Perryer, and Michael Stevenson Gallery. The Encounter. Michael Stevenson, 2009.
- Mntambo, Nandipha. Nandipha Mntambo – Locating me in order to see you. University of Cape Town, 2007.
- Mntambo, Nandipha, und Sophie Perryer. Nandipha Mntambo: Ingabisa, 16 August–15 September 2007. Michael Stevenson, 2007.
