= Zelda Nolte =

South African British sculptor and woodblock printmaker

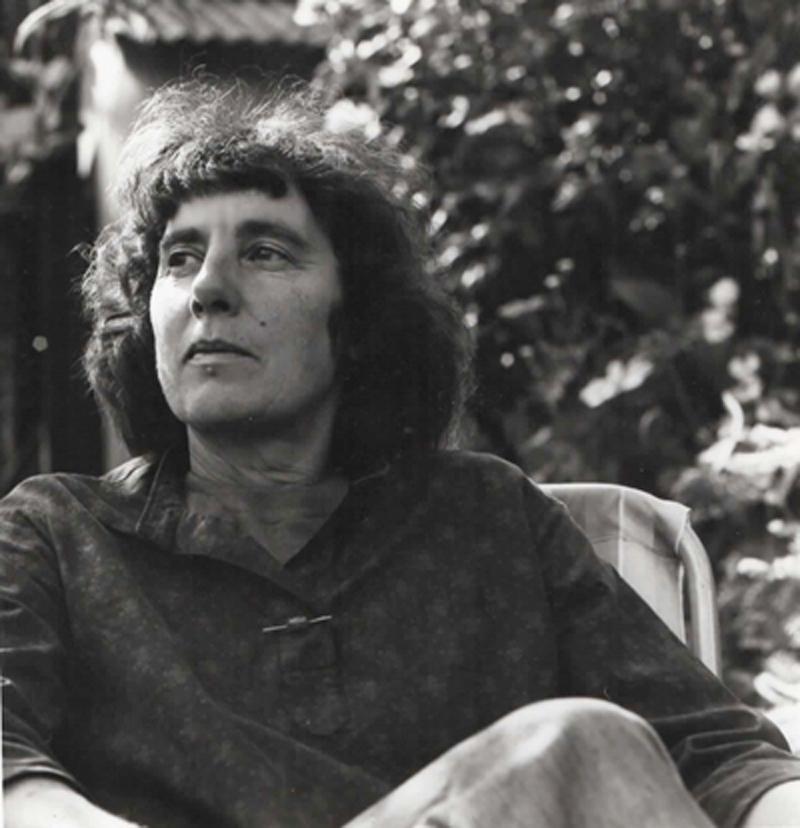
- Nolte c. 1970s
- Born: 1929; Cape Town, South Africa
- Died: 2003 (aged 74); Granada, Spain
- Education: Zürcher Hochschule der Künste Zurich Switzerland
- Alma mater: University of Cape Town Michaelis School of Fine Art
- Known for: Sculpture, woodcuts, woodblock printing
- Style: Modern art Abstract art
- Movement: Postwar art, Contemporary art

Zelda Nolte (1929–2003) was a South African-British sculptor and woodblock printmaker.

== Education ==
Zelda Nolte studied at the Kunstgewerbeschule Zürich under the directorship of Johannes Itten, which became Zürcher Hochschule der Künste, and sculpture, at Michaelis School of Fine Art, University of Cape Town under Professor Lippy Lipshitz.

== Exhibitions and collections ==
Nolte represented South Africa in the 1963 Sao Paulo Bienale. She has work in the collection of the Iziko South African National Gallery, Cape Town and the New Hall Art Collection, University of Cambridge.

Selected Exhibitions to 1978 from Zelda Nolte Exhibition catalogue 1978, Hobson Gallery, Cambridge, UK. (archive):

1960 South African Quadrennial Exhibition, National Gallery Cape Town, South Africa

1962 National Art Gallery, Port Elizabeth, South African

1963 Solo Exhibition, Association of Arts Gallery, Cape Town, South Africa

1963 São Paulo Biennale, Brazil

1964 Johannesburg Festival Exhibition, Milner Park, Johannesburg, South Africa

1963 New Orleans International Exhibition, USA

1964 South African Art Today, National Gallery, Cape Town, South Africa

1964 "Group Six", Wolpe Gallery, Cape Town, South Africa

1965 Lidchi Gallery, Johannesburg, South Africa

1965 National Gallery, Salisbury (Harare), Zimbabwe

1968 Group Exhibition, AIA Gallery, London, UK

1971 Solo Exhibition, Artist House Gallery, Jerusalem.

1972 Florence Biennale International Exhibition of Graphic Art, Florence, Italy

1973 Group Exhibition, Binyanei Ha'Ouma, Jerusalem

1974 National Art Gallery Cape Town, "50 Years Michaelis", Cape Town, South Africa

1977 Kettles Yard, Cambridge, Cambridge Society of Painters and Sculptors Group Exhibition, Cambridge, UK

== Work ==
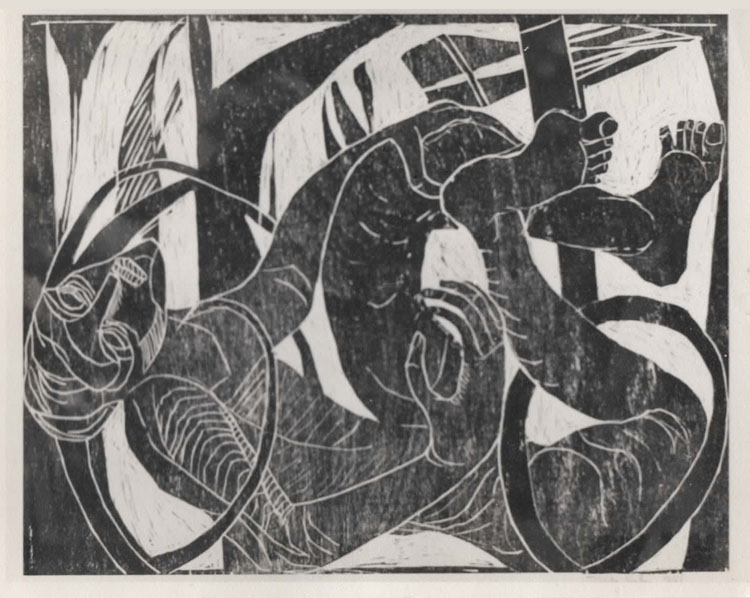
Zelda Nolte - Africa - Woodcut Woodblock Print on Rice Paper c.1964 c. 40x33 inches 102x84 cm

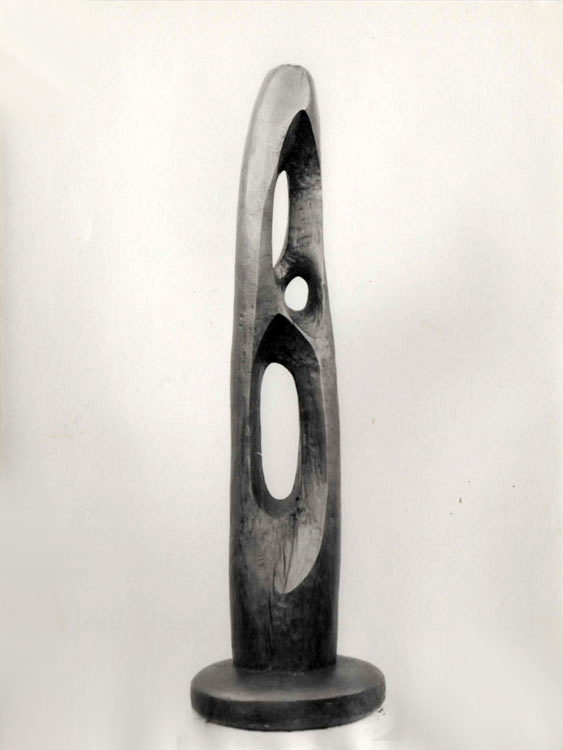
Zelda Nolte Sculpture Form c.1963-4, Wood; height c. 60"_152 cm

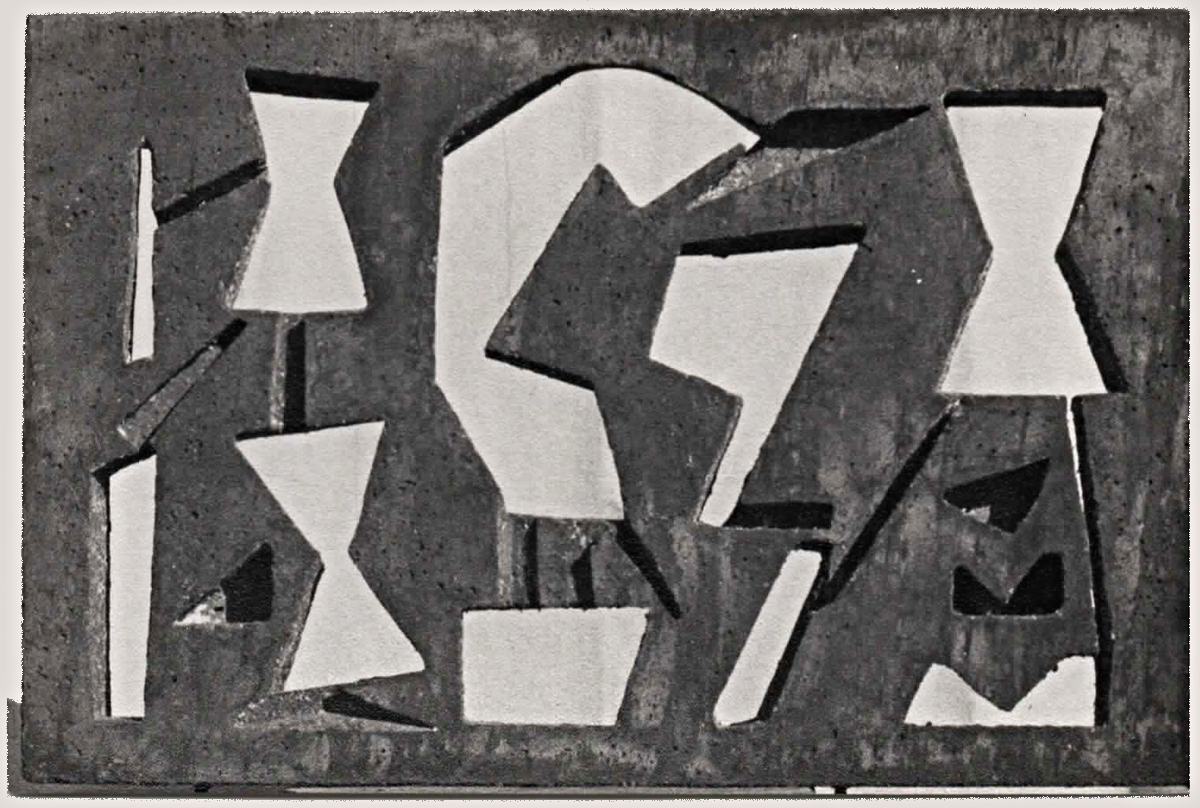
Zelda Nolte sculpture maquette poured concrete c.1964-5

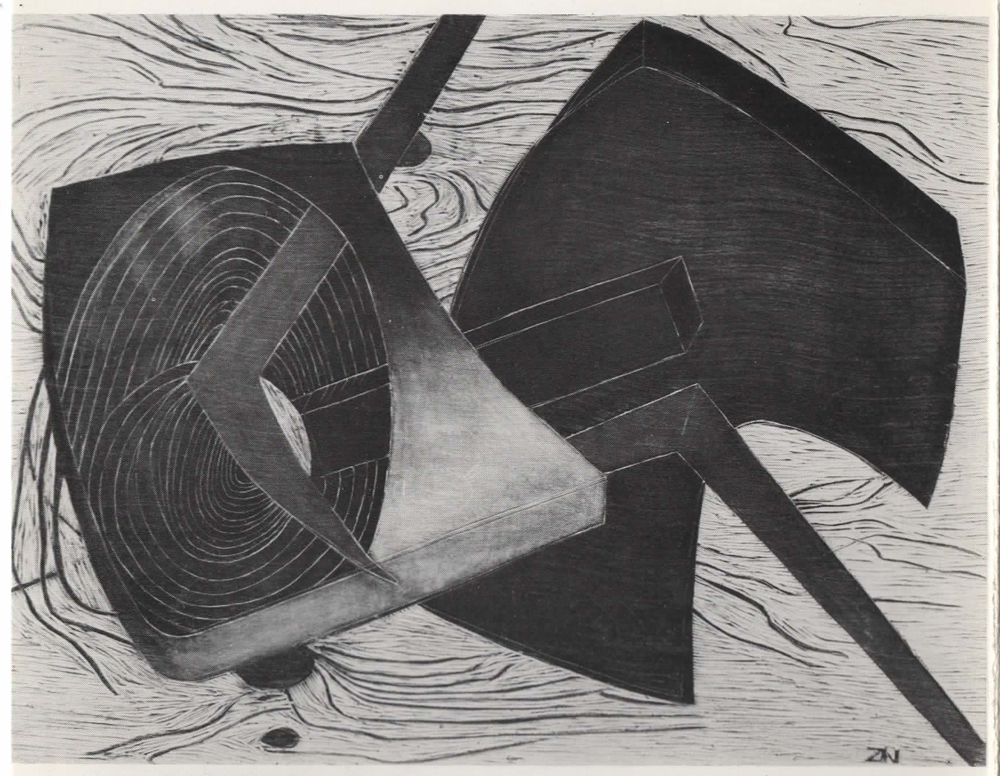
Zelda Nolte Black Hole Woodblock Print 1977

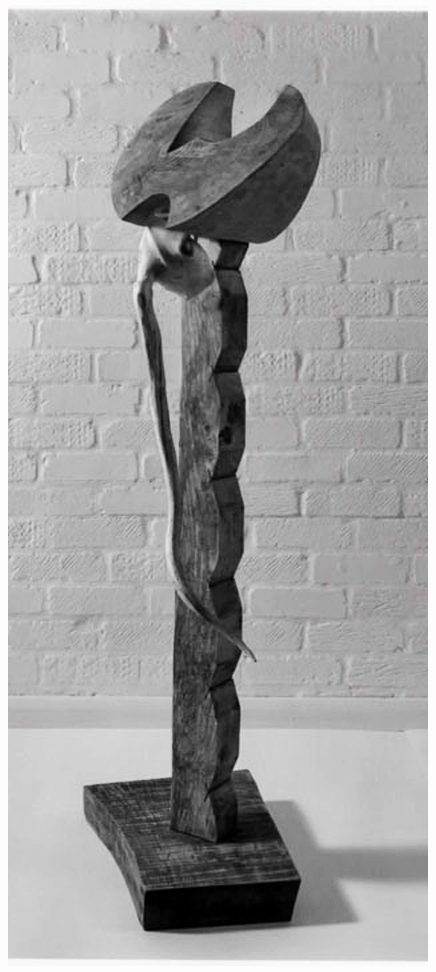
Zelda Nolte - Dreaming The Dark; Sculpture - wood, bone. c. 1990

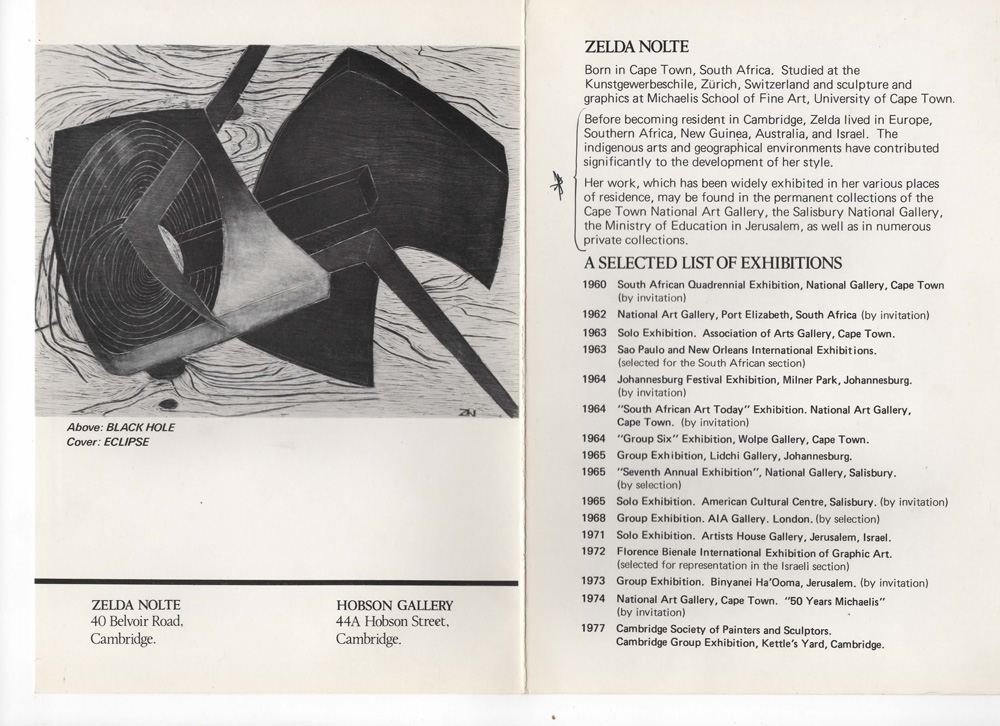
