= Virginia MacKenny =

South African artist and writer (born 1959)

Virginia MacKenny (born 1959, in London, England) is a South African artist and writer. She is currently an Associate Professor of Painting at Michaelis School of Fine Art at the University of Cape Town in Cape Town, South Africa.

== Early life ==
Her family relocated when she was thirteen years old to Pietermaritzburg, Kwa-Zulu Natal, South Africa.

== Education ==
MacKenny's post-secondary education began at the University of Natal. She attended school for a Bachelor of Fine Arts. Some time after completing her degree, MacKenny began teaching at the Durban University of Technology. In 2001, she received her Master of Arts in Gender Studies from University of Kwa-Zulu Natal.

== Artistic style ==
MacKenny's art is influenced by painting, gender, and deep ecology.

== Performance art ==
MacKenny also has participated in performance art, in which she recognizes observations about modern society. In her performance work Waymaker she draws inspiration from religious and personal journeys, MacKenny walked 700 km aside an ancient route in France called the Camino. While walking, MacKenny painted small watercolours.

== Writings ==
As a scholar of both gender relations and fine art, MacKenny's writings focus on feminism in art. Furthermore, her influences within her writing are based in much of South Africa's political sphere. Her scholarly article "Post-Apartheid Performance Art as a Site of Gender Resistance" is an analysis on gender resistance in South Africa as a result of the abolishing of the Apartheid.

== Political works ==
MacKenny has been involved in works discussing the political landscape of modern-day South Africa. Her writing discusses the problem with the polluted land and the lack of action being done to aid the farmers that are agriculturally dependent. Her work with Lesley Green and Nikiwe Solomon suggests ways to improve the lands pollution and to better the country.

== Awards ==
- 2010 Donald Gordon Creative Fellow Award
- 2004 Ampersand Fellowship New York
- 1996 All Things Digital - 1st prize
- 1996 FNB Vita Art Now – Finalist
- 1991 Volkskas Atelier Award- 1st prize
- 1979 New Signatures – Merit Award Winner

== Exhibits ==
MacKenny has had exhibits on display since her first in 1985, Images of Natal, Jack Heath Gallery, University of Natal, Pietermaritzburg. Other exhibits include: 100 Years of Natal Art (1985), Virginia MacKenny: Past Forms (1995), Gay Rights, Rites, Re-writes (1995), and more recently, Then and Now: Conversations in Time (2015). Her many exhibits reflect her life and experiences in Natal, as well as her artistic expression.
