= Le Roux Smith Le Roux =

South African artist (1914-1963)

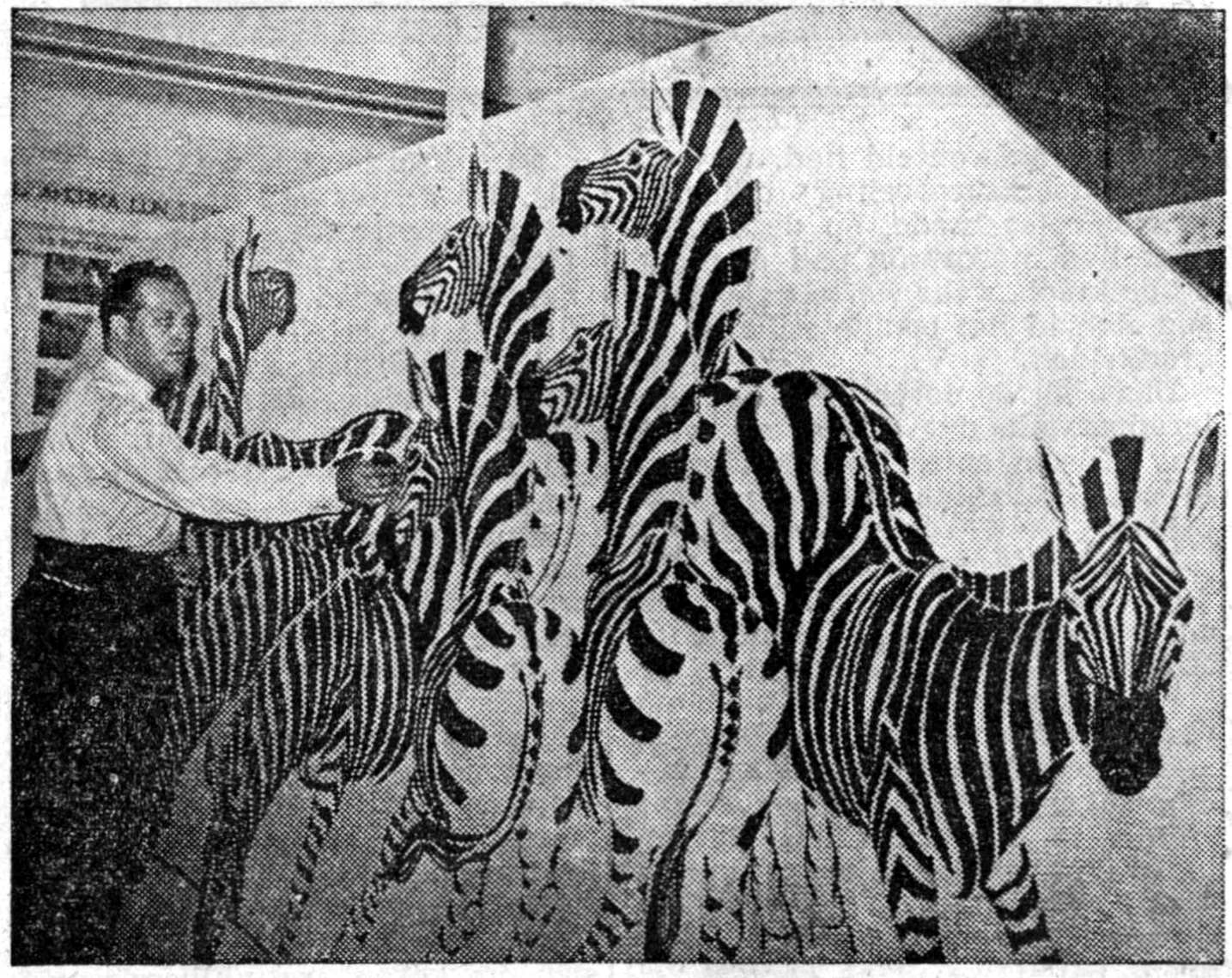
Smith Le Roux, 1949

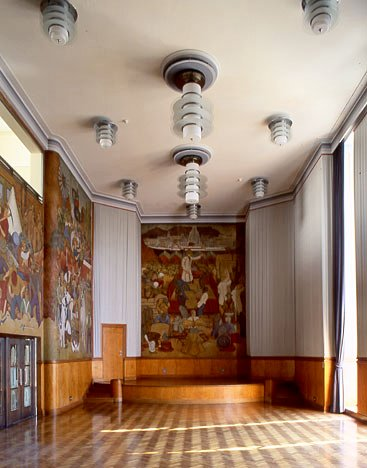
The Assembly Room in the Mutual Building Cape Town

Le Roux Smith Le Roux (1914–1963), sometimes rendered LeRoux Smith LeRoux, was a South African artist, actor, broadcaster, art critic and art dealer, considered to be the most distinguished specialist muralist the country has produced. Le Roux was infamous for his involvement in the Great Tate Affair.

== Early life and career ==
Le Roux Smith Le Roux was born in Cape Town, the son of Johannes Anthonie Smith (1886–1954), journalist, painter and art critic, who had joined the Ossewabrandwag, a pro-Nazi movement, during the Second World War and became its leader in the Cape Province. Le Roux's brother Anthonie Smith, was an architect, primarily of Dutch Reformed Church buildings. They collaborated when Le Roux did paintings for one of the churches in Ladismith in 1942.

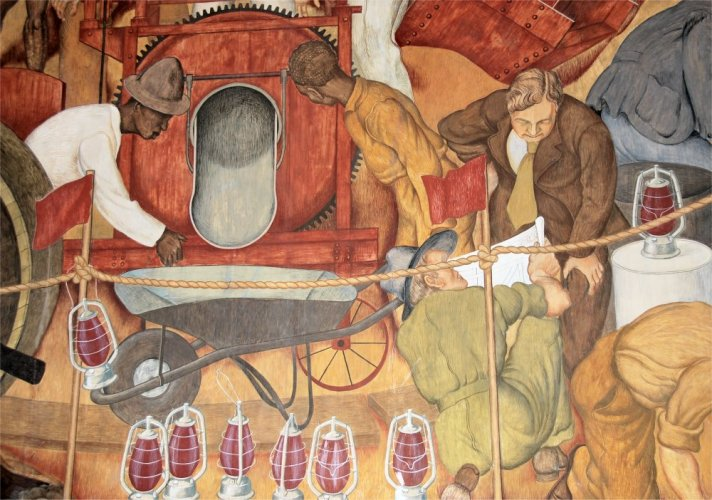
Detail of Mutual Building murals

In 1930 Le Roux matriculated from a prominent Afrikaans school in Cape Town, Jan van Riebeeck High School. Le Roux displayed precocious talent, completing his degree at the University of Cape Town Michaelis School under John Wheatley at the age of 17. He received a government bursary to study mural-painting in Italy and was commissioned in 1938, with fellow student Eleanor Esmonde-White, to create murals for the South Africa House Mural Room. Later in that year, the two artists received a commission to provide murals for the Cunard Liner Queen Elizabeth.

On his return to South Africa, he joined the New Group of artists and busied himself with several large commissions in Cape Town and Johannesburg, most notably the murals of the Mutual Building in Darling Street, Cape Town, completed in 1942. His versatility was also on display in his illustrations of Die vlammende Fez, a book by Afrikaans poet I.D. du Plessis (1900–1981) published in 1944.

Between 1943 and 1949 he was Director of the Pretoria Art Center and curator of the Pretoria Art Collection. He served on the War Art Advisory Committee and was a member of the International Art Club, South Africa.

== The Great Tate Gallery Affair ==
John Rothenstein was appointed Director of the Tate in 1938. He was challenged to find curators willing to work for the low salary of £300. While on a trip to South Africa in 1950, he met Le Roux Smith Le Roux. Le Roux convinced Rothenstein that he held views on race that were out of place in the Apartheid state, and that he would suffer for these. Already charmed by the young South African, Rothenstein offered him the position of Deputy Keeper at the Tate.

Le Roux Smith Le Roux immediately embarked on a campaign to effect the ouster of Rothenstein as Director. He used his access to archival material to find and leak information that would put the director in a bad light, among other misdemeanours, allowing the sale of a Renoir from the Courtauld Fund without proper procedures being followed. It was, however, his neglect of important European art movements like Fauvism, Cubism, Futurism and Surrealism that raised the ire of collectors like Douglas Cooper, an art historian and collector of Cubist works. Cooper's close friend Graham Sutherland, the painter, was a Trustee of the Tate and supported Le Roux.

Le Roux found another ally in Max Aitken, Lord Beaverbrook, whose newspapers, Evening Standard and Daily Express published his leaks. As a public servant, Rothenstein was unable to comment on the press reports. With allegations left unanswered, Le Roux's campaign gained support from scholars (Denis Mahon), art critics (Denys Sutton of the Financial Times), members of parliament, and the press (Kingsley Martin of the New Statesman).

The sensationalised resignation of Graham Sutherland from the board of trustees and venomous public letters from Douglas Cooper eventually gave the critics pause. Then, at the opening of Richard Buckle's Diaghilev exhibition, an exasperated Rothenstein, taunted by Cooper, lashed out and knocked the man's glasses off. The incident might have been a crisis for Rothenstein (he was nearly dismissed), but persuaded critics that the matter had gone too far. Le Roux's leaks attracted scrutiny and he was dismissed in 1954. Questions were asked of Rothenstein in the House of Lords however he would remain Director until 1964.

== After the Tate ==
Le Roux was employed by Lord Beaverbrook, sitting on a panel of judges of the Daily Express exhibition of pictures in 1955. Fellow judges were Graham Sutherland, art philosopher Herbert Read and Anthony Blunt, later identified as a member of the Cambridge Five.
