= Lionel Davis =

Visual artist and teacher

- Born: 1936 (age 89–90); Cape Town, South Africa
- Education: BA Fine Art degree with the University of Cape Town in 1994
- Known for: Artist of the anti-apartheid movement

Lionel Davis is a visual artist, teacher, and public speaker from South Africa. He was born in Cape Town, South Africa, in 1936 in the infamous District Six neighborhood. He was a prominent figure in the anti-apartheid movement, and was incarcerated for seven years on Robben Island, an infamous prison for political prisoners under the apartheid regime. It was here that Davis met Nelson Mandela.

== Life ==
Growing up in District Six, Davis was exposed to the excessive police violence that characterized the racist apartheid regime. In 2003, Davis shares with the Contemporary Africa Database that these experiences of abuse and injustice often involved his intervention. His personal disputes with police revealed to him a need to be more informed about society, so Davis sought out higher educational opportunities. Night school introduced Davis to the Non European Unity Movement (NEUM), African Peoples Democratic Union of South Africa (APDUSA), and the National Liberation Front, an APDUSA faction led by Neville Alexander.

In 1964, Davis was arrested and sentenced to seven years on Robben Island for "conspiring to commit sabotage." Four years into his incarceration, Davis received a school-leaving Senior Certificate by completing his work via correspondence. After his release in 1971, he was put under house arrest for five years. Once his time was complete, 1978 and 1990 he worked as assistant organiser at the Community Arts Project (CAP) in Cape Town. At the Evangelical Art and Craft Centre at Rorke's Drift in 1980 he worked toward a Diploma in Fine Arts. His interest in art led him to complete a BA Fine Art degree with the University of Cape Town in 1994.

Davis has contributed to literary magazines, books on education, poetry anthologies and calendars. He produced cartoons for a children's magazine and taught screen-printing at CAP. He participated in the Triangle Workshop in New York City and the Thupelo Workshop in Johannesburg. In 1988 he was deeply involved in community-based children's education. He exhibited several times from 1981 to 1987, also in Gaborone, Botswana and Pine Plains, New York, United States. In 1995 he worked for the South African National Art Gallery as a part-time art educator. Lionel held his first solo exhibition at The Gill Allderman Gallery in April 2008.

After spending seven years imprisoned on Robben Island, Davis lived there with his family as an employee of the Robben Island Museum until 2006. He first worked as a tour guide and later moved to the Island Education Department as an Education Officer. His work includes developing education materials on prisoners and political imprisonment on the Island. On the Island he is better known as 'uncle' Lionel.

After leaving the island Lionel continues to do his art, participate in many community projects, gives talks on and as well as guides private tours of the Island

He is married to Barbara Davis and they have three children, Sandra, Basil and Leon.

== Work ==
Awakenings: The Art of Lionel Davis (2017)

== Exhibitions ==
Title	Institution(s)	Start date	End date
Lionel Davis: Gathering Strands	Iziko South African National Gallery; District Six Museum	22 June 2017	1 October 2017

== See also ==
- List of people subject to banning orders under apartheid
