= Phyllis McCarthy =

Phyllis McCarthy with champions Glenaholm Claire and Glenaholm Gazelle

1950 McCarthy twins at dog show with ch Glenaholm Dido and Glenaholm Cleopatra

Phyllis McCarthy with Ch Glenaholm Gay, Glenaholm Adelle, Ch Glenaholm Claire and Glenaholm Gazelle

Phyllis and Victor McCarthy at Glenaholm

Phyllis McCarthy (12 March 1903 – 16 February 1986) was a South African breeder of and authority on Rhodesian Ridgeback dogs. She established the Glenaholm Kennels in 1949 in Pietermaritzburg, South Africa, played a seminal role in the Ridgeback community and produced a long line of Ridgebacks featuring prominently in the ancestry of almost all modern members of the breed.

== Biography ==
Phyllis was born on 12 March 1903, in Johannesburg, South Africa, the second of four children born to George Scarlet Abinger Keeling and Mabel Lydia Moorby, an accomplished painter, poet and composer. Her parents moved to Durban when she was quite young and it was here that she grew to early womanhood and married Victor McCarthy in 1925. They moved onto a large citrus farm (which they named Glenaholm) in Town Bush Valley just out of Pietermaritzburg and turned to raising poultry and a family of five children.

Her eldest son, Cuan McCarthy, became one of South Africa's best fast-bowlers and distinguished himself in Test matches against England.

McCarthy died on 16 February 1986, in Johannesburg, at the age of 82.

== Breeding practice ==
Abandoning the Doberman Pinschers with which she had started, Phyllis McCarthy bought her first 2 RRs, Cleopatra of Efabe and Sheba of Efabe (SA3089 born 10.12.1948) and found they had most of the physical and temperamental qualities she sought. She next brought to bear her extensive knowledge of selective breeding acquired from her program of producing world-class poultry, and soon moulded her distinctive type of Ridgeback. During the 1960s she made use of an experienced geneticist flown in from England. She spent much time and effort attending dog shows throughout South Africa in order to study the top dogs that were available and to win champion status for her own dogs.

When Phyllis retired Glenaholm kennels were taken over by her daughter, Lauri Venter, and Norah Reid. Norah Reid Ormerod went to the USA and still breeds Glenaholm Rhodesian Ridgebacks there. Laurie Venter died in 2013 and the South African Glenaholm kennels went back into the McCarthy name under Litia, Phyllis's daughter in law.

== Champions from Glenaholm ==
- Glenaholm Asaad 7.4.2000 dog
- Glenaholm Asa Songai Of The South 6.29.2007 dog [USA]
- Glenaholm Attis of Pamparidge KUSA 374194 10.11.1976 dog
- Glenaholm Balubageera
- Glenaholm Cara KUSA247480 28.4.1971 bitch
- Glenaholm Champagne KUSA 0556750 3.12.1981 bitch
- Glenaholm Character of Isimangamanga KUSA 343515
- Glenaholm Charme of Mushana KUSA 500030
- Glenaholm Chipfupi of Mushana KUSA 315060
- Glenaholm Claire KUSA 124726 31.1.1956 bitch
- Glenaholm Copper of Gazeley KUSA 243391
- Glenaholm Dizani of Kyaphatsha KUSA 349853
- Glenaholm Dlomluka KUSA 495173 2.11.1979 dog
- Glenaholm Fundi's Friend bitch
- Glenaholm Gadla KUSA 333977 25.7.1975 bitch
- Glenaholm Galore of Rydgeway KUSA 580607 03.05.1982
- Glenaholm Gasa KUSA 333971 25.7.1975 dog
- Glenaholm Gawain KUSA 391487 22.5.1977 dog
- Glenaholm Gay KUSA 3049 bitch
- Glenaholm Gazelle KUSA 162244 14.8.1962 bitch
- Glenaholm Giya KUSA 285904 27.7.1973 bitch
- Glenaholm Greta KUSA 104720 3.12.1951 bitch
- Glenaholm Gwandana of Langley KUSA 296611
- Glenaholm Habela of Ezulwini 21.9.1977
- Glenaholm Inyosi KUSA 270870 bitch
- Glenaholm Jacobus AKC HB154876 27.09.1965 dog
- Glenaholm Jahzara Kabusha HP135291/01 24.4.2004
- Glenaholm Jessalyn bitch CKC
- Glenaholm Jila KUSA 311850 25.1.1975 bitch
- Glenaholm Jolly Jinx KUSA BQ 000203 19.04.1998
- Glenaholm Joybelle 23.10.1954 bitch
- Glenaholm Judge
- Glenaholm Juliette H652671 31.01.1956 bitch
- Glenaholm Juma KUSA 311842 25.1.1975 dog
- Glenaholm Justa Crown Jewel
- Glenaholm Kalayo Duke of Diwa 10.13.19 AKC HP58631403 dog
- Glenaholm Kazoo of Isibindi KUSA 631636 dog
- Glenaholm Kruger Rand KUSA 444610 dog
- Glenaholm Lady Muck of Mushana KUSA 315062 bitch
- Glenaholm Lalela KUSA 270871 15.3.1973 bitch
- Glenaholm Markgraf Julius van de Pfalz KUSA 116955 23.8.1954 dog
- Glenaholm Mignonne of Beauridge AKC HA186522 20.11.1960 bitch
- Glenaholm Naomi KUSA 247478 28.4.1971 bitch
- Glenaholm Pamba KUSA 327119
- Glenaholm Pollux of Yggdrasil KUSA 390163 dog
- Glenaholm Sakaza KUSA 285896 18.12.1973 dog
- Glenaholm Sasazela SHSB 248560
- Glenaholm Satebbe 18.12.1973 1s Ch of Brazil
- Glenaholm Shona of Shangara KUSA 349851
- Glenaholm Silala KUSA 495193 7.11.1979 bitch
- Glenaholm Siyabonga of Shangani HB544751
- Glenaholm Skipper of Everton KUSA 144696
- Glenaholm Strauss of Inkabusi KUSA 160302 dog
- Glenaholm Taariq SPKP 1476/11 10.12.2009 dog
- Glenaholm Tandiwe KUSA 236109 bitch
- Glenaholm Tanya of Chienneill KUSA 160300 bitch
- Glenaholm Uhuru of Ulundi KUSA 374557
- Glenaholm Vlyt of Cartouche KUSA BA008226
- Isimanga's Zima of Glenaholm KUSA 485635 9.4.1980 dog
- Lord Sam KUSA 264768 14.10.1972 dog
- Owlsmoor Glenaholm Adonis 09.11.1958 dog

== Southern African breeders of note (1900-1970) ==
- Avondale Mr T Kedie-Law, Salisbury
- Ballyboden Mr Francis Lane-Joynt, Rhodesia
- Between Rivers Commander & Mrs RMG Knight, Rhodesia
- Bo Mrs BG Clotworthy, Bulawayo
- Bresward Mr Brian S Reynolds, Johannesburg
- Bulala Mr Charlie Gauche, Bulawayo
- Cartouche Richard & Debbie van Aken, Johannesburg
- Cherlyn Mr Dick Wait, Johannesburg
- Chienneill Penny & Bill Neill, Johannesburg
- Chipiri Hubert Tremlett, Mashonaland
- Chucklenook Mrs Laurie Venter, Honeydew
- Clonmore Stephen Martin Lanigan O'Keeffe, Rhodesia
- Collace John Fisher Jock Fleming, Rhodesia
- De Holi Major Tom C Hawley, Aliwal North
- Dewsbury Graham Stacey, Bulawayo
- Drumbuck Mrs LM Dickson/Mrs. A.M. Smithwick, Bulawayo
- Ealing Jan du Preez, Mashonaland
- Efabe Mr AD Carbutt
- Eskdale Mr Francis Richard Barnes, Bulawayo
- Everton DE Small, South Africa
- Formona Miss Dorothy Mona Brooke-Popham, Bulawayo
- Gazeley Jack C & Helen Bocock, Johannesburg
- Glenaholm Mrs Phyllis McCarthy, Pietermaritzburg
- Glenaholm Laurie Venter & Norah Reid, Honeydew
- Groombridge Capt BC Waller, Salisbury
- Grootedam Louis Herring, Kimberley
- Hope Fountain Rev Charles Helm, Bulawayo
- Inkabusi Mrs I Kingcome, Salisbury
- Isimangamanga Mrs J Brenda S Yeates, Cape Town
- Khami Graham Stacey, Bulawayo
- Kumalo Mabel Josephine Stacey Vigne, Bulawayo
- Kyaphatsha Mrs Kay Miller, Johannesburg
- Langley Mr Errol Hepker, Johannesburg
- Leeridge Mr P Evans, Rhodesia
- Leo Kop Miss Mabel Wellings, Rhodesia
- Lions Den Mrs Dorothy Enid Strickland, Shamva, Rhodesia
- Marandellas Mrs Seager, Rhodesia
- Marquardsingel Mr Steph Potgieter, Bloemfontein
- Maxwood Mr Sid Cawood, Honeydew, Transvaal
- Merriwa Mr Rob Thompson
- Meyendell Mrs M Mooiman, Johannesburg
- Mindemoya Mrs FHA Pritchard, Bulawayo
- Mpani Mrs Mylda Arsenis, Salisbury>Honeydew
- Muneni Captain Bevis Basil L Miles, Rhodesia
- Mushana Margaret & Sammy Wallace, Rhodesia
- Pronkberg Mr Steph Potgieter, Bloemfontein
- Revelston Mr DR Keith, Swaziland
- Robanton Mr Neville Venter, Johannesburg
- Rockridge Miss Josephine Howard, Johannesburg
- Sandford Edward Selby Ferguson Chance, Mashonaland
- Shangara Liz & Brian Megginson, Johannesburg
- Shipley Major HG Mundy, Rhodesia
- Sipolilo Mr Arthur Tracker Smith (born Clowes), Rhodesia
- Thornbury Mr & Mrs C P Green, Johannesburg
- Thornby Mrs WE Heydeman, Hartley, Mashonaland
- Ulundi Miss Janet Murray, Johannesburg>Australia
- Umvukwe Major Eustace & Audrey Ainslie, Mashonaland
- Viking Mr Vernon H Brisley, Salisbury
- Weltevreden Johannes Cornelius van Rooyen, Tati, Botswana
- Weltevreden Mr & Mrs DA Blumberg, Bulawayo
- Yaligimba Mr David Haywood, Johannesburg
- No Kennel Name Mrs Phyllis M Archdale, Marandellas

== Bibliography ==
- Rhodesian Ridgeback Pioneers Linda Costa (Kantara investments, Australia 2004) ISBN 0-646-43501-9
- The Complete Rhodesian Ridgeback Peter Nicholson & Janet Parker (Macmillan Publishing, New York 1991) ISBN 0-87605-295-2
- The Rhodesian Ridgeback Indaba JN Murray (Privately published, Australia 1989) ISBN 0-9588874-1-1
- The Rhodesian Ridgeback Today Stig C Carlson (Ringpress Books, UK 1999) ISBN 1-86054-089-9
- De Rhodesian Ridgeback in Nederland 1945-1991 PCR Geurts & JG Coppens (Rhodesian Ridgeback Club Nederland 1995) ISBN 90-802595-1-9
- The Rhodesian Ridgeback - The Origin, History and Standard TC Hawley (Privately published, South Africa 1957-80)
- Rhodesian Ridgeback Ann Woodrow (Privately published, England 1986) ISBN 0-9511408-0-9
- A Rhodesian Ridgeback Handbook JN Murray (Privately published, Australia 1996) ISBN 0-9588873-3-0
