= Zwelethu Mthethwa =

South African painter and photographer

- Born: 1960 (age 65–66); Durban, South Africa
- Education: Michaelis School of Fine Art, Rochester Institute of Technology
- Known for: Painter and photographer

Zwelethu Mthethwa (born 1960) is a South African painter and photographer. He was convicted of murder in 2017 and was incarcerated at Pollsmoor Prison.

== Biography ==
Mthethwa, a native of Durban, graduated from the Michaelis School of Fine Art, University of Cape Town. In 1985 he received a Fulbright Scholarship to study at the Rochester Institute of Technology, where he received a Master of Fine Arts degree in imaging arts in 1989. Upon returning home, he worked for some years in business, and then became a lecturer on photography and drawing at the Michaelis School in 1994. He left the post in 1999 to devote himself full-time to his art. Mthethwa is known for his large format color photographs, but also works in paint and pastel; he has had over 50 solo exhibitions in galleries around the world. His work was included in the 2005 Venice Biennale and the 2004 Gwangju Biennale.

== Murder conviction ==
In 2014, Mthethwa was charged with the murder of a 23-year-old woman named Nokuphila Kumalo. According to Jillian Steinhauer, "The murder took place on April 13, 2013 when a man brutally hit and kicked Kumalo, who's believed to have been a sex worker, to death on a street in Woodstock, a suburb of Cape Town. Closed-circuit cameras captured the assault and led police to Mthethwa. There is also reportedly an eye witness. The artist denies the charges and claims innocence."

The trial was postponed several times, after the initial allegations. Sentencing proceedings began as expected on 24 May 2014. According to Ashleigh Furlong, "The defence's two witnesses, clinical psychologist Martin Yodaiken and social worker Anne Cawood, testified today in the Western Cape High Court on the first day of sentencing proceedings. Both emphasised that if sent to prison, Mthethwa would be unable to support family members and would not be able to contribute to society." She goes on to state, "The maximum non-custodial sentence is five years. The minimum sentence for murder with intent, in the form of dolus eventualis, which Mthethwa was convicted of, is 15 years. However, this can be reduced if there are mitigating circumstances." The witnesses brought up previous explanations of memory loss due to intoxication from alcohol as mitigating factors. However, Xolani Koyana, explained that the "prosecutor Christenus van der Vijver put it to Yodaiken that the court had rejected Mthethwa's memory loss argument as fabrication. He told him he found it strange that someone could stomp another person 62 times and not recall such a violent act. The prosecutor told the court a non-custodial sentence would be a slap on the wrist and send the wrong message to the public."

Mthethwa's trial was postponed again on 1 June 2015. The postponement was approved so additional evidence could be collected. Apparently, Mthethwa's lawyer William Booth had trouble gaining access to private properties to gather verbal evidence. The trial continued on 2 June 2015. Mthethwa plead not guilty, and the court was set to continue on 8 June 2015.

According to Ashley Furlong, as of 3 February 2016, Mthethwa's case was again delayed. Furlong stated, "The reason for [the] delay was twofold—the Shona interpreter for a Zimbabwean man who was set to take the stand was very sick, and there was a need to compile a 'working document' of the papers that forensic pathologist Dr Linda Liebenberg might refer to."

As of 16 March 2017 (almost 4 years after Nokuphila Kumalo's murder and 3 years since the beginning of the trial), Mthethwa was found guilty of murder. "According to ArtThrob, who reported from inside the courtroom, Mthethwa's bail has been withdrawn. His sentencing will be delivered on March 29, 2017... The verdict was met with jubilation, on site and on social media channels. Outside the courthouse, activists from Sex Workers Education and Advocacy Taskforce (SWEAT) and Sonke Gender Justice were celebrating the guilty verdict."

On 29 March 2017, he requested bail. According to Jenna Ethridge, Mthethwa requested bail to be with his family and make arrangements for his art. She went on to state, "Mthethwa wanted to personally inform his 15-year-old daughter in England of his conviction. He [also intends] to sort out her tertiary education and funding for the next few years... The court [will] rule on Mthethwa's bail on Friday [31 March 2017]. Sentencing arguments [were] postponed until April 20." As expected, Mthethwa's bail was denied on 31 March 2017. Yet another delay, as of 20 April 2017, Mthethwa's sentencing was postponed by Judge Patricia Goliath until 24 May 2017.

Sentencing proceedings were slated to resume on Wednesday 31 May 2017 at 9 am. On 7 June 2017 he was sentenced to 18 years imprisonment for the murder of Nokuphiwa Kumalo. As stated in the Daily Maverick, "The accused's standing as an international acclaimed artist does not earn him a special sentence," said Western Cape High Court Judge Patricia Goliath.

On the 8 July 2026, Mthethwa was released from prison and placed on parole after serving half of his 18 year sentence.

== Solo exhibitions ==
- 2009: Zwelethu Mthethwa: New Works, Jack Shainman Gallery, New York
- 2010: Zwelethu Mthethwa, iArt Gallery, Cape Town
- 2010: Zwelethu Mthethwa: Is it our goal…? And Other Related Issues, Circa on Jellicoe, Johannesburg, South Africa
- 2010: Zwelethu Mthethwa: Brick workers & Contemporary Gladiators, Galeria Oliva Arauna, Madrid, Spain
- 2010: Zwelethu Mthethwa: Inner Views, Studio Museum in Harlem, New York
- 2011: New Works, iArt Gallery (now Brundyn + Gonsalves), Cape Town
- 2012: Zwelethu Mthethwa: Sugar Cane (2003–2007), curated by Diego Cortez. John Hope Franklin Center, Duke University, Durham, North Carolina.
- 2012: Zwelethu Mthethwa, curated by Kirsten Hileman, The Baltimore Museum of Art, Maryland
- 2013: Zwelethu Mthethwa: New Works, Jack Shainman Gallery
