= Billy Mandindi =

South African activist-artist

Buysile "Billy" Mandindi (1967–2005) was a black South African activist-artist who participated in a landmark protest in Cape Town in 1989, the so-called Purple Rain Protest. Later, still covered with the purple dye that riot police sprayed on protesters, Mandindi created a linocut celebrating the spirit of freedom.

== History ==
Born in Cape Town on 24 February 1967, Billy Mandindi was educated in King William’s Town, in the Ciskei region of the Eastern Province. Mandindi mostly taught himself art, although he did take classes at the Community Arts Project (1985–1986), and at the Michaelis School of Fine Art of the University of Cape Town for one year (1987-1988). He also regularly attended the Visual Arts Group workshops between 1988 and 1989.

Mandindi was associated with Hardground Printmakers for 4 years, which produced his prints and portfolios of linocut. He also drew, painted, and sculptured.

During the 1980s and 1990s, Mandindi participated in group and solo exhibitions in Cape Town, Durban, Johannesburg, and Stellenbosch. Mandindi's work featured in a Museum of Modern Art Exhibition in London (1990) and in the South African National Gallery in Cape Town (1994).

The Belgian curators of the 1995 Africus Biennale in Johannesburg invited him to show his work. In 1996 Mandindi was invited to Denmark, Copenhagen as part of the “Container 96-Art Across the Oceans” exhibition. He collaborated with Gavin Younge on "Umkrweli/House," which referred to issues of housing and access to land. Mandindi next participated in the “Fault Lines” exhibition at the Castle of Good Hope in Cape Town by invitation. The exhibition commemorated the uprising of black students in 1976 against the implementation of Afrikaans as a medium of instruction for certain subjects in black schools.

== Art ==
Mandindi's earlier art reflected the struggle for political liberation. For example, in the print triptych "Prophecy" (1985) and again in the oil painting "African Madonna" (1986) Mandindi reinterpreted the fateful Xhosa prophetess Nonqawuse in relation to the experience of economic exploitation of migrant labourers under apartheid. In 1988 Mandindi participated in the "Palette of Oppression" group exhibition with Rodger Meintjies and Fuad Adams. His works can be found all over the world

Mandindi's art combined warm colours and comic figures with serious political issues to create unsettling results. One of the best examples is "The Death of Township Art" (1989), in which two demonic angels hold a burning a tire around a giraffe's neck. Mandindi refers here to the method used by township vigilantes to kill suspected collaborators by means of the so-called "necklace". He continued to use warm colours in his later, non-political work, such as the geometrically shaped series "Matters Arising".

Renowned South African artist and curator David Koloane hailed Mandindi as one of South Africa's most versatile multi-media practitioners. For example, he used tin, paint, wire and wood for "Fire Games" (1985). Mandindi also worked with more traditional media, such as oil pastels (for example, in "The Death of Township Art"), and his use of charcoal (in a self-portrait, for instance).

== Public collections which include Mandindi's art ==
- Caltex Collection
- South African National Gallery, Cape Town
- Truworths Collection
- University of South Africa, Pretoria
- University of Stellenbosch
- University of the Witwatersrand, Johannesburg
- SOAS University of London

== See also ==
- The purple shall govern
- Purple Rain Protest

The University of the Western Cape also houses several of Billy Mandindi's prints as part of its massive Community Arts Project collection housed in the Centre for Humanities Research.
