= Stanley Pinker =

- Born: Stanley Pinker; 1924; Windhoek, South-West Africa
- Died: 16 June 2012 (aged 87); Cape Town, South Africa
- Education: Continental Art School, Cape Town (under Maurice van Essche); Hammersmith School of Art, London (under Alistair Grant)
- Known for: Painting, Drawing,, Printmaking
- Notable work: Night (1964), oil, 152.5 x 91.5 cm Death of a Shepherd, oil, 136 x 136 cm, South African National Gallery
- Awards: Molteno Medal (2001)

Stanley Pinker (1924 – 16 June 2012) was a South African painter and printmaker.

== Early life and education ==
Pinker was born in 1924 in Windhoek, South-West Africa (present-day Namibia). He served as a soldier with the Allied Forces during the Second World War and began painting in Europe after the war. Returning to southern Africa, he studied art in Cape Town and subsequently spent several years in Europe.

== Career ==
In 1969, Pinker returned to South Africa to take up a lecturing post at the Michaelis School of Fine Art at the University of Cape Town, where he taught until 1986. He is considered one of South Africa's leading modernist painters, alongside contemporaries such as Alexis Preller and Cecil Skotnes. In 2001 he was awarded the Molteno Medal for lifetime achievement in painting.

In 2014, his painting 'Love' (c.1965-68) was sold for ZAR R3.4m on auction.

== Awards and recognition ==
- 2001: Molteno Medal
