= Kagiso Patrick Mautloa =

South African visual artist (born 1952)

- Born: September 24, 1952 (age 73); Ventersdorp, North West

Kagiso Patrick "Pat" Mautloa (September 24, 1952, Ventersdorp, Western Transvaal) is a multi-media visual artist based in Johannesburg, South Africa.

== Early life and education ==
At the age of two Mautloa's family relocated to Soweto and later attended Morris Isaacson High School. In 1969, while in High School, he began studying visual arts at Jubilee Art Center and the following year at Mofolo Park Arts Centre where he continued his studies for the next five years. He was awarded a bursary which he accepted, after his involvement in the Soweto Uprisings, to study at ELC Rorke's Drift Art and Craft Centre in 1978 for two years and studied under Dan Rakgoathe. Following his education he worked as a graphic designer and a professor at Mofolo Park Arts Centre and at Federated Union of Black Artists Arts Centre (FUBA). In 1981 Mautloa started as a banker and worked for SABC, but quit to become an artist.

== Career ==
In 1985, the year of South African State of Emergency, Mautloa formed the artist's residency, Thupelo Workshops, in Cape Town with David Koloane and Bill Ainslie, supported by Triangle Network, FUBA, FUNDA and the Johannesburg Art Foundation.

Although Mautloa lives in and is inspired by Alexandra, his studio is at The Bag Factory, the Johannesburg member of The Triangle Network. He and Sam Nhlengethwa were invited to be the first residents of the Bag Factory when David Koloane and Robert Loder created it in an area not strictly black or white during Apartheid segregation in 1991. Some of Mautloa's other studio mates were William Kentridge, Helen Sebidi, Penny Siopis, Wayne Barker, Benon Lutaaya and Deborah Bell. Mautloa is now a board member for Bag Factory.

Mautloa was awarded a residency as part of the Triangle Workshop, which hosts international artists in an intensive two week program based in upstate New York founded by sculptor, Sir Anthony Caro. In 1991 he won the Vita Art award. In 2008 he was an artist in residence at Nirox Arts. In 2012 he was an artist in residence at National School of the Arts in Johannesburg where he led a multi-media mural workshop. In 2014 Mashumi Art Projects and -Eyethu Centre in Soweto featured a retrospective of his work.

He works both figuratively and abstractly, using not only traditional painting, drawing and print materials but often integrates found objects as substrates and sculptural and assemblage elements for his work as well, having made numerous sculptural monuments. He made a series of masks in 2016 inspired by the diversity of people in South Africa for a public installation at the 1:54 Art Fair, an exhibition that draws from fifty-four countries in a contemporary dialogue.

Mautloa's work is owned by numerous public collections including Iziko South African National Gallery, Johannesburg Art Gallery, Pretoria Art Museum, International Bank for Development and Reconstruction, University of Zululand, University of Fort Hare, Sasol Corporate Collection, The Spier Art Collection, SABC Collection and Reader's Digest amongst others. Mautloa has shown at Goodman Gallery. He said, "the good thing about this [being an artist] is that you don't retire. You paint up until the last mark you can ever make in your life."

== Personal life ==
Mautloa is married to visual artist Bongiwe Dhlomo.
