= Bill Ainslie =

South African artist, teacher and activist

- Born: William Ainslie; 10 April 1934; Bedford, Eastern Cape, South Africa
- Died: 1989 (aged 54–55)
- Education: University of Natal, Pietermaritzburg
- Spouse: Sophia Jansen-Schottell

William “Bill” Ainslie (10 April 1934 – 1989) was a South African artist, teacher, activist, as well as the founder of several art projects.

== Early life ==
Ainslie was born on 10 April 1934 in Bedford, Eastern Cape, where his family farmed a parcel of land called Spring Grove”. His family moved to the Karoo when he was a young boy, but subsequently left for Johannesburg because of a drought. His father died when he was eight years old.

Ainslie had intended to become a priest, until art claimed his imagination when he was a student. He studied at the University of Natal, Pietermaritzburg from 1952–1955. In 1958, he completed his honours degree in Fine Art. On completion of his studies he taught at Michael house, a school in KwaZulu Natal. He also taught art at Cyrene Mission in Zimbabwe and King Edward VII School in Johannesburg, his alma mater.

In 1960, Bill married Sophia Jansen-Schottell (known as Fieka). He died in a car accident in August 1989 returning from an international workshop at the Cyrene Mission in Zimbabwe.

== Career ==
Ainslie's paintings transitioned from monumental African figures featuring mothers and children, and farm labourers to abstract expressionism. He was renowned for his use of striking and vibrant colours.

His painting found connections with American abstract expressionism and as a result, Ainslie tended to teach abstraction.

His work has been exhibited at the Goodman Gallery, the Johannesburg Art Gallery and the National Gallery of Zimbabwe.

== Legacy ==
Bill Ainslie founded the Johannesburg Art Foundation in 1982. He trained artists such as Helen Sebidi, William Kentridge, Dumile Feni and David Koloane. The studio was a non-profit organization began informally, operating from fellow artist Cecily Sash's home before Ainslie eventually, in 1977, bought a house that came to be the Johannesburg Art Foundation. Ainslie's art foundation maintained a teaching philosophy which opposed any form of discrimination and stressed that art education should be a possibility for everyone.

The Johannesburg Art Foundation made a significant contribution to South African art and more particularly the progressive development of black South African artists.

Ainslie helped start FUBA (the Federated Union of Black Artists), FUNDA (which means learn in Xhosa) and the Alexandra Arts Centre.

In 1985, the year of South African State of Emergency, Ainslie formed the artist's residency, Thupelo Workshops, in Cape Town with David Koloane and Kagiso Patrick Mautloa, supported by Triangle Network, FUBA, FUNDA and the Johannesburg Art Foundation.

Between 1964 and 1988 he held several exhibitions and received three Art SA Today awards.

On 29 August 1999, The Bill Ainslie Gallery was opened at the Johannesburg Art Foundation to coincide with the 10th anniversary of his death. The Foundation closed in 2001 due to a lack of support.
