= Allina Ndebele =

South African artist

- Born: Allina Khumalo; 10 December 1939 (age 86); Swart Mfolozi
- Occupation: Artist
- Years active: 1962–present
- Awards: The Order of Ikhamanga in Silver (2005)

Allina Ndebele (née Khumalo) (born 10 December 1939) is a South African artist and weaver known for her tapestries. She was born in Swart Mfolozi in KwaZulu Natal Province and after training to be a nurse se she secured a job as a translator for Peder and Ulla Gowenius who were in the process of setting up what was to be Rorke's Drift Art and Craft Centre. She quickly picked up weaving and studied in Sweden to become a teacher-weaver. She later went on to establish her own weaving studio, Khumalo's Kraal and obtained the Order of Ikhamanga in Silver in 2005. She still lives at Khumalo's Kraal today.

== Early life ==
Allina Ndebele was born at Ekuhlengeni Mission, on the Swart Mfolozi near Vryheid, in what is now known as KwaZulu Natal Province. One of six children, Allina Ndebele was raised primarily by her mother, as her father worked in Johannesburg as a migrant labourer. She obtained her Junior Certificate (Standard 9), and applied to do nursing training at Ceza Mission Hospital in KwaZulu Natal. Opportunities to study further for Ndebele were limited not only by financial constraints, but also as a result of the Extension of University Education Act, 1959 which made it a criminal offence for non-white students to register at formally open universities without formal permission from the Minister of Internal Affairs.

== Career ==
In 1961, whilst working as a trainee at the hospital, she was employed as an interpreter by Swedish Lutheran Missionaries Peder and Ulla Gowenius who were attempting to set up an occupational therapy project at the hospital. Ndebele began to participate in the occupational therapy teaching as well as the translation, encouraging women at the hospital with various handicrafts. Asked how she came about this approach towards occupational therapy, she responded:

"I followed my intuition and started to learn all kinds of art techniques to assist the patients by art therapy. Weaving I liked best. I felt very little satisfaction when following fixed patterns or working out of the themes that teachers provided me with. I could feel that was not my thing."(156)

The success of this influenced the Goweniuses to set up the Arts and Crafts Advisors course, a formal crafts-driven occupational therapy course which was implemented in other local mission hospitals and focused on training black women as crafts teachers and later became the Rorke's Drift Art and Craft Centre. Ndebele, who initially learnt weaving, spinning and design, formally enrolled in the first intake of the training course at the Centre, and received a year long scholarship to train at Steneby Folkshögskola in Dals Långed, Sweden as a teacher-weaver, which she pursued from 1964 to 1965. The course taught not only weaving, but also spinning and dyeing of wool – skills which Ndebele would later use in her own weaving centre. The technique of free weaving – which is a more improvised and challenging style as opposed to following geometric patterns – was central to Ndebele's development as an artist and developing her own style and subject matter. In an interview, she reflects:

"When I work I see the picture and my hand will go over the wool and I know where I will have the image. Sometimes I change it again and take out all the wool, start over till I am happy with it. It is a slow process, for painters it must be easier." (155)

She taught and worked as a workshop supervisor for the weaving course at Rorke's Drift until 1977, but her time for her own work was mostly limited to the evenings. In 1978, after running the workshop at Rorke's Drift and mastering her craft, Allina Ndebele left the Centre and established Khumalo's Kraal Weaving Workshop, where she would go on to produce over 100 unique narrative works until she retired in 2005. Khumalo's Kraal was Ndebele's father's home, and she received support from both her parents in setting up her new workshop.

== Work ==
Allina Ndebele addresses a range of topics in her tapestries, often drawing on the oral storytelling tradition inherited from her grandmother. Whilst Rorke's Drift had its foundations as a Christian Missionary exercise, the Goweniuses encouraged artists and weavers to explore other ideologies and stories, from personal or historical to folk stories. Ndebele's work encompasses all three, and often features interpretations of Zulu stories told to her by her grandmother, Zihudele MaZulu Mhlongo. Mpisi and the Lion (1992) in the collection of the Johannesburg Art Gallery explores one of these stories. After her departure to Khumalo's Kraal, a strong Zulu iconography emerged in her work, with themes such as water as a life giving force and the structure of the Zulu homestead.

Ndebele also engaged in personal storytelling The Tree of Life or Isihlahla Sempilo in Zulu, is one such example, which was commissioned in 1985. The Mantis Wedding is a piece about Allina Ndebele's separation from her husband, and tells the story of a legend about the romance between a praying mantis and a bird, who eats the mantis after their wedding. Her largest piece, Nqakamatshe and His Muti Magics [sic] (1999), was commissioned for the MTN Art Collection and measures 200 x 450 cm.

== Collections ==
Allina Ndebele's work is held in permanent collections of almost every major South African art museum, as well as internationally, among others in the USA, Sweden, the United Kingdom, the Netherlands, Germany, Switzerland and Australia:

- Durban Art Gallery
- Pretoria Art Gallery
- Nelson Mandela Metropolitan Art Museum (Port Elizabeth)
- Tatham Art Gallery (Pietermaritzburg)
- Unisa Art Gallery (Pretoria)
- Johannesburg Art Gallery
- Iziko South African National Gallery (Cape Town)
- William Humphreys Art Gallery (Kimberley)

== Exhibitions ==
- 2018 Johannesburg Art Gallery, Johannesburg
- 1998 Thami Mnyele Institute, Amsterdam
- 1998 Allina Ndebele; de draad van het verhaal, Museum De Stadshof, Zwolle
- 1993 Standard Bank Gallery, Johannesburg
- 1990 Developing Art Exhibition, Development Bank of South Africa
- 1985 Pretoria Art Museum, Pretoria (Solo Exhibition)
- 1985 Nelson Mandela Metropolitan Art Museum, Port Elizabeth
- 1985 William Humphreys Art Gallery, Kimberley

== Awards ==
First National Bank Vita Award (1994)

Thami Mnyele Institute residence (1998)

MTN SA Foundation residence (2001)

Order of Ikhamanga in Silver (2005)
