= Sue Williamson =

South African artist (born 1941)

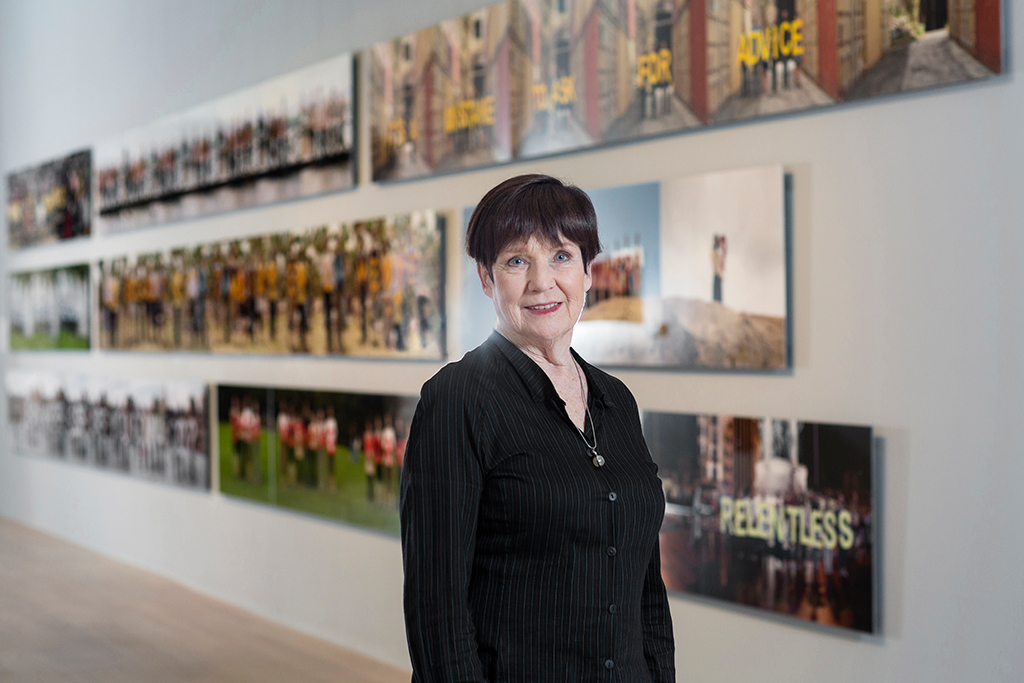
- Born: 21 January 1941 (age 85); Lichfield, England
- Education: Art Students League of New York and Michaelis School of Fine Arts at the University of Cape Town
- Known for: installation art, photography, video art
- Awards: Visual Arts Research Award, Smithsonian Institution (2007)

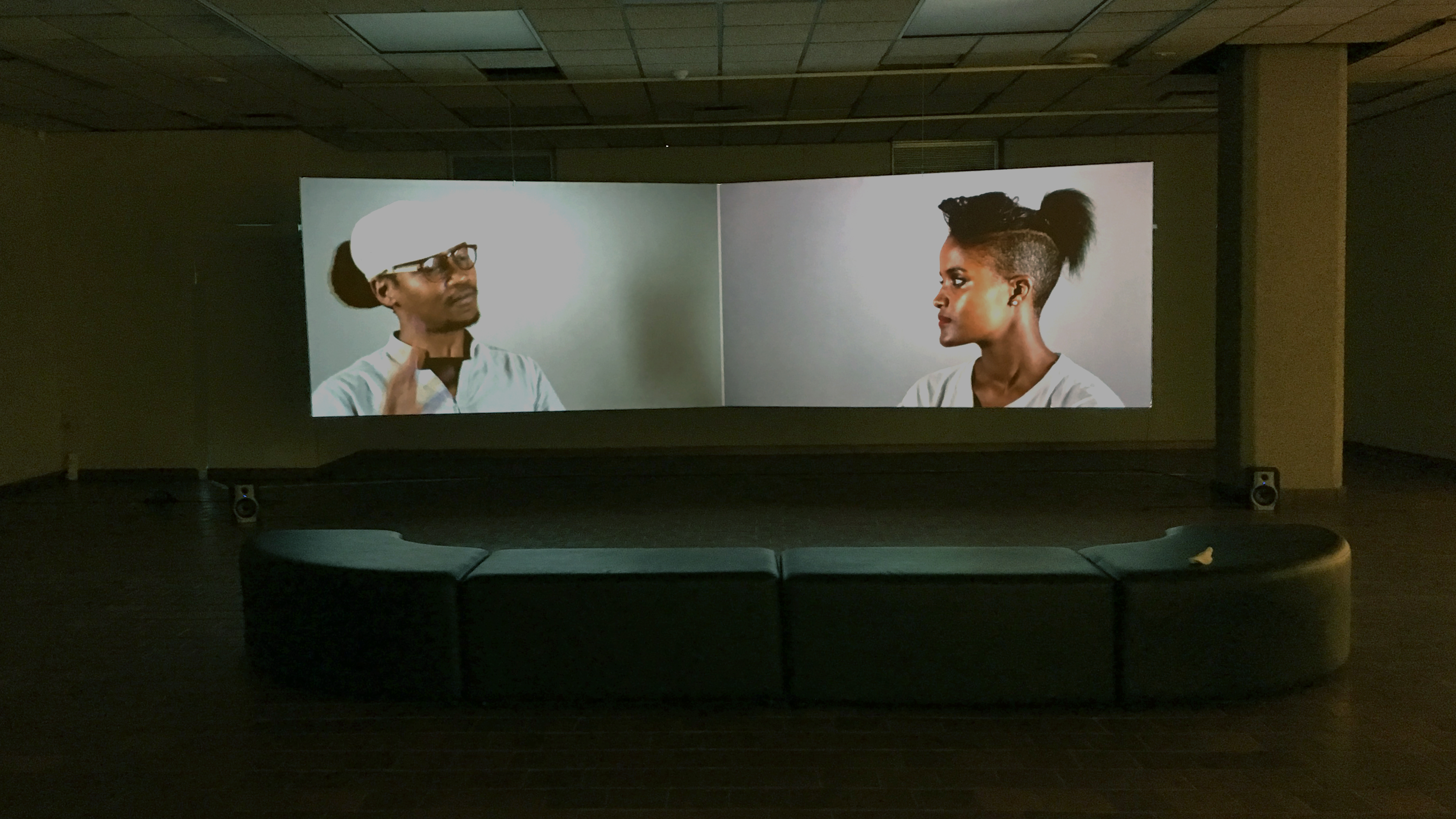
It's a pleasure to meet you (2016) from No More Fairy Tales Two-channel video, playing time 24.4mins

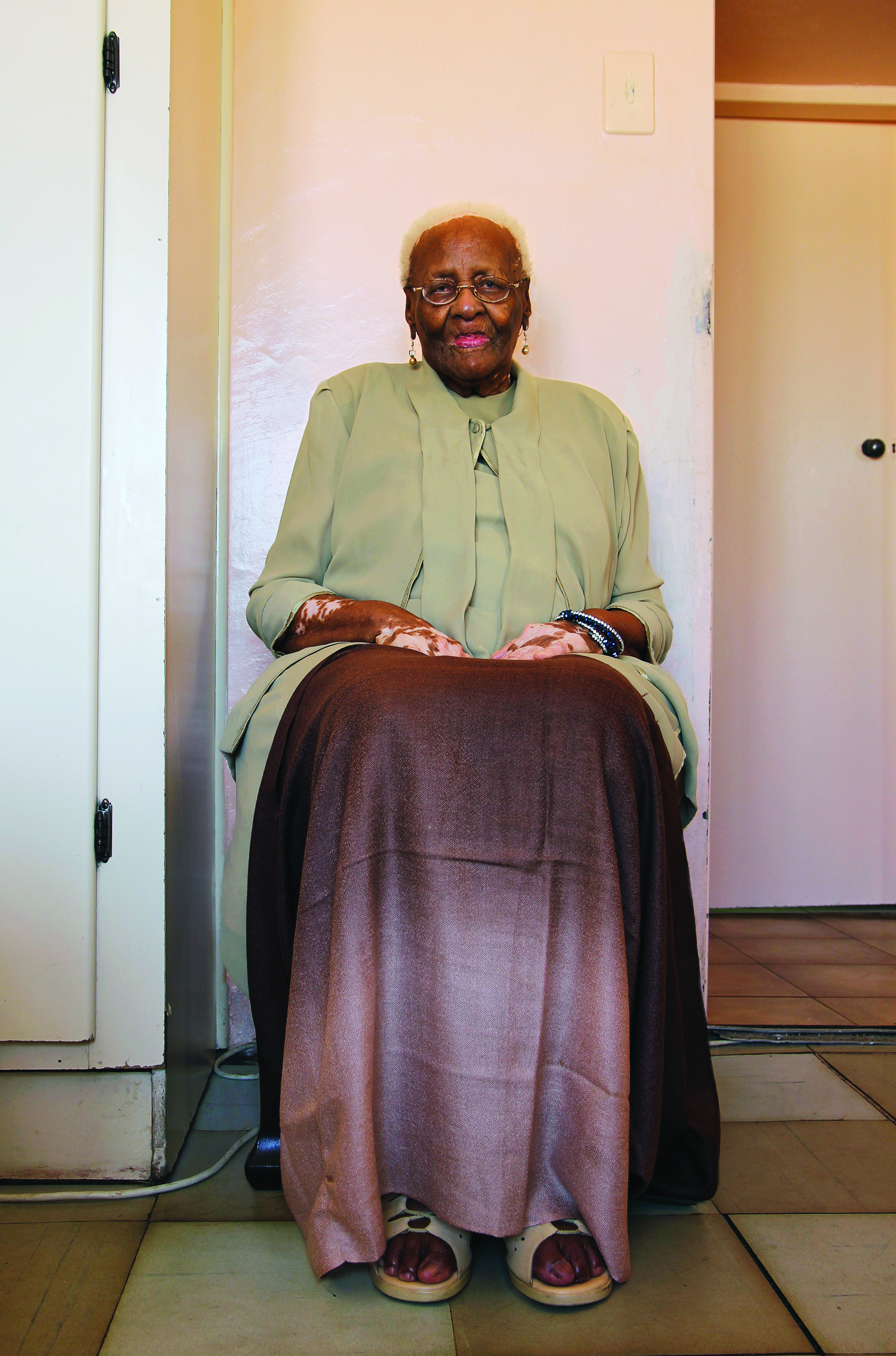
Rebecca Kotane, Soweto (2013) from All Our Mothers - an ongoing series of photo portraits of women dating from 1983.

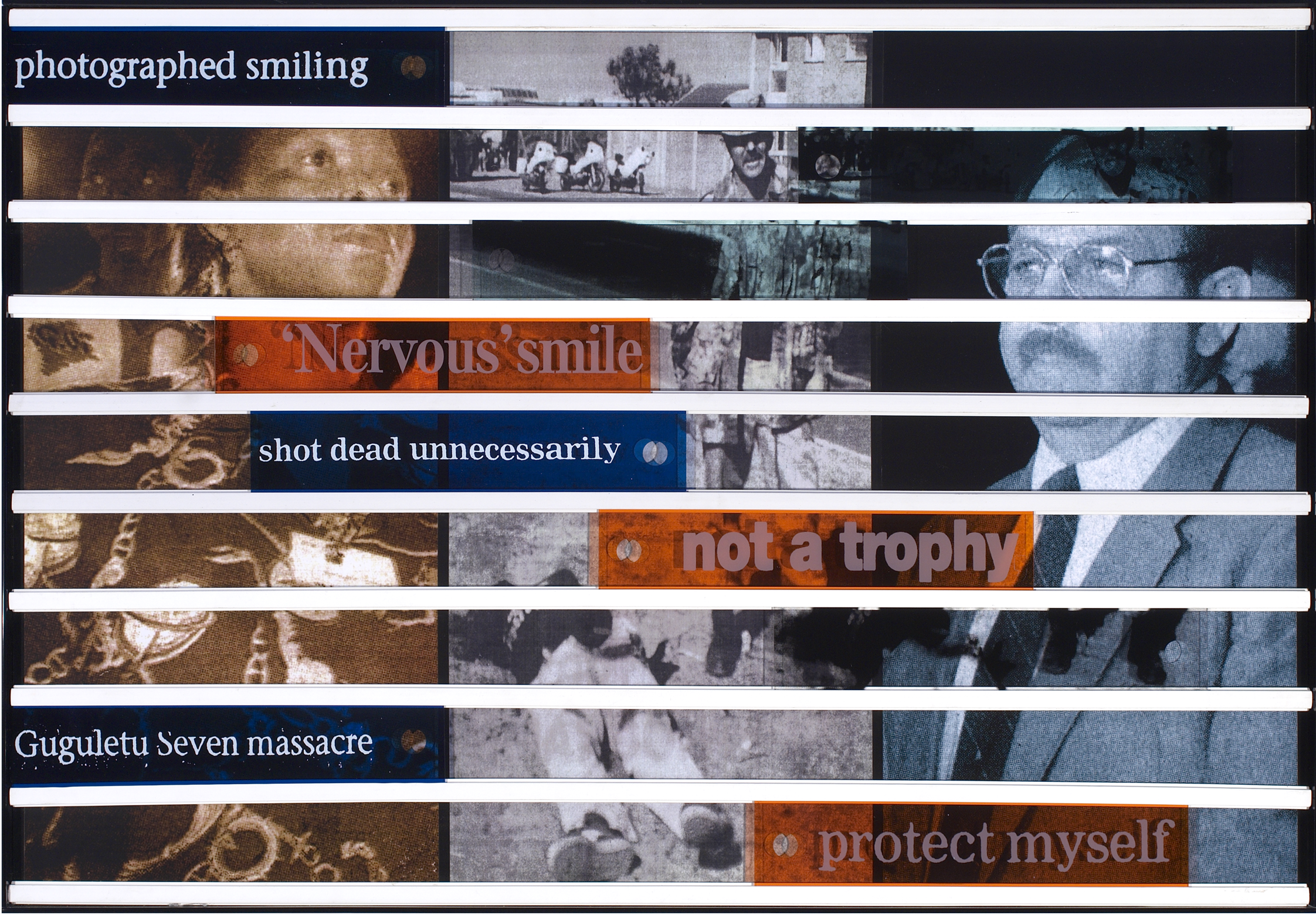
Truth Games(1998), Family of Guguletu Seven - why were you smiling – Capt. John Sterrenberg

Sue Williamson (born 1941) is an artist and writer based in Cape Town, South Africa.

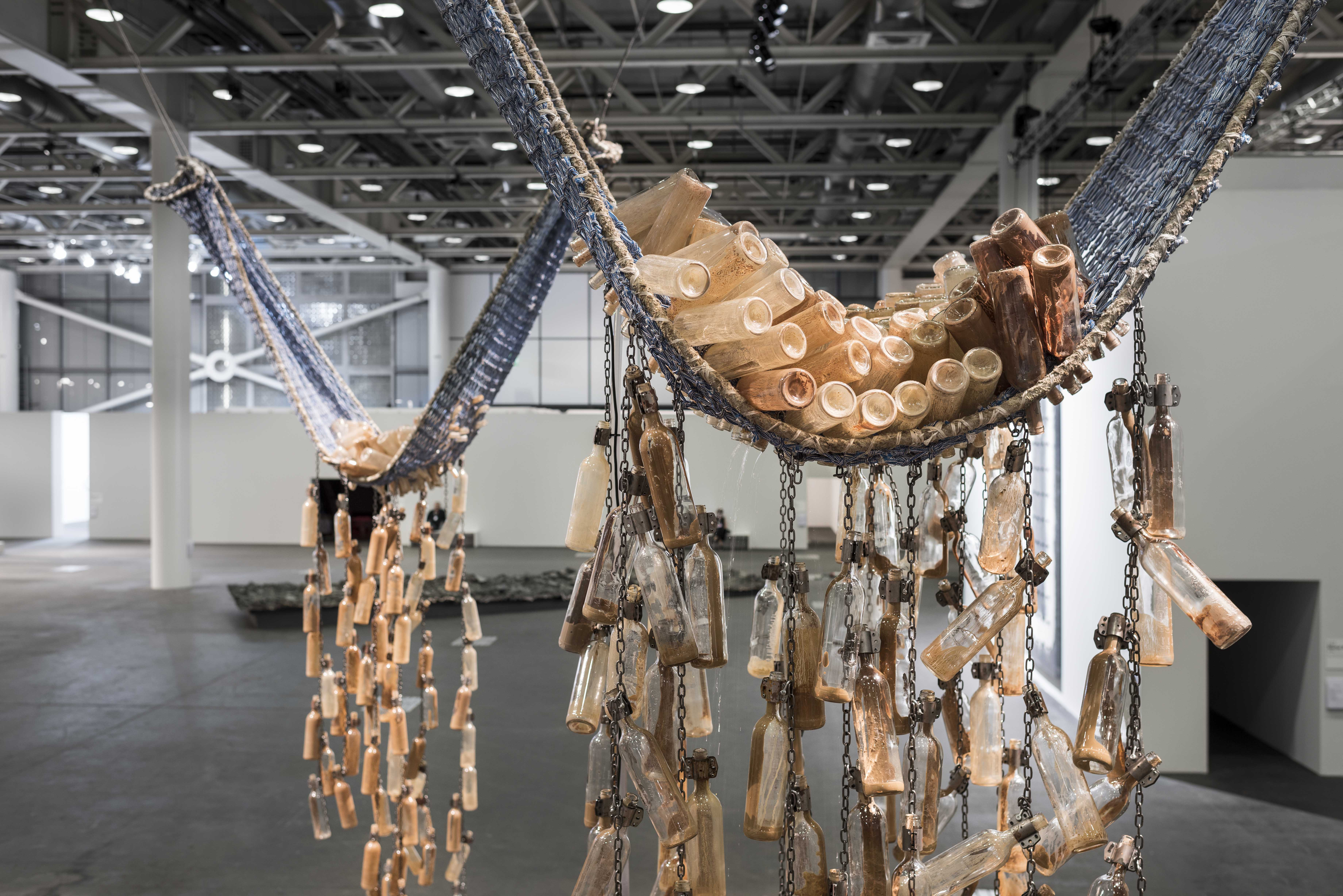
Messages from the Atlantic Passage, Installation, Basel Unlimited 2017, Switzerland

== Life ==
Sue Williamson was born in Lichfield, England in 1941. In 1948 she immigrated with her family to South Africa. Between 1963 and 1965 she studied at the Art Students League of New York. In 1983 she earned her Advanced Diploma in Fine Art from the Michaelis School of Fine Art, Cape Town. In 2007, she received the Visual Arts Research Award from the Smithsonian Institution in Washington D.C and in 2011 the Rockefeller Foundation Bellagio Creative Arts Fellowship. In 2013, she was a guest curator of the summer academy at the Zentrum Paul Klee in Bern.

== Work ==
Williamson's work engages with themes related to memory and identity formation. Trained as a printmaker, Williamson has worked across a variety of media including archival photography, video, mixed media installations, and constructed objects.

In One Hundred and Nineteen Deeds of Sale (2018), the names given by slave masters, ages, sexes, and places of birth, along with the names of buyers and sellers, prices paid, and the date of purchase of people from the slave trade in India are written in black ink on cotton shirts. The shirts are imported from India, dipped into muddy waters drawn from the Cape Coast Castle, and hung around the grounds until Heritage Day, September 24, 2019. They are then taken down and returned to India, where they are washed clean and rehung as an installation at the Aspinwall House in Kochi. These people were transported by Dutch East India Company to work at the Cape Town Castle and the Company's Gardens. One Hundred and Nineteen Deeds of Sale Williamson incorporates the history and memory of the slave trade in order to transform the stigmatizing history into a history that can address and combat global inequalities. Upon opening the exhibition, Williamson read extracts of historical accounts while a woman picked up each shirt, read out the information on it, and then took it inside to be dipped in mud and hung on a washing line. Art brings history of slave trade to life The installation tells a story of loss and symbolizes the essence of a person that is floating in the wind, but all that remains is their memory.

Williamson’s 2016 work, The Lost District, is an homage to South Africa’s District Six. Like much of her other work, The Lost District addresses the effects of apartheid on South Africans. District Six was culturally and ethnically diverse until more than 60,000 of its non-white residents were forced to relocate by the South African government during apartheid. This installation consists of plexiglass engravings of street-view images of what district six used to look like based on archival images. Steel bars cover the engravings, representing the actions of the South African government. During the exhibition, Williamson engraved a window in the gallery that overlooks the remains of District Six with a reconstruction of what District Six may have looked like in the 1960s. With this engraving, Williamson aimed to “record the old buildings which still stood, mainly churches and mosques and schools, along with those hundreds of cottages and terrace houses which had been destroyed.”

Williamson has produced many forms of resistance art that examines the history of South Africa. and in 2009 set her artistic view to exploring globalization with her ongoing piece, Other Voices, Other Cities, which was included in Push the Limits. exhibition, of February 2021, in Italy. She is the founding editor of “Artthrob.co.za”.

== Public collections ==
Williamson's work is in the collection of a variety of museums, including the Museum of Modern Art in New York, the National Museum of African Art - Smithsonian Institution in Washington D.C., the Iziko South African National Gallery in Cape Town, and the Victoria and Albert Museum in London. Williamson has also participated in group exhibitions including The Short Century (2001), Liberated Voices (1999), the Johannesburg Art Biennale (in 1997 and 1995), the Havana Biennale (1994), and the Venice Biennale (1993).

== Selected exhibitions ==
- 2000: Messages from the Moat, Archive Building, Den Haag, the Netherlands
- 2001: Can't forget, can't remember, Iziko South African National Gallery, Cape Town, South Africa
- 2002: The Last Supper Revisited, National Museum of African Art, Smithsonian Institution, Washington D.C., USA
- 2003: Sue Williamson: Selected Work, Centre d’Art Contemporain, Brussels, Belgium*
- 2004: Messages from the Moat, Castle of Good Hope, Cape Town
- 2009: The Truth is on the Walls, Wifredo Lam Centre, Havana, 10th Havana Biennale, Cuba*
- 2012: The Mothers: a 31 Year Chronicle, Castle of Good Hope, Cape Town
- 2014: There's something I must tell you, Iziko Slave Lodge, Cape Town
- 2015: Other Voices, Other Cities, SCAD Museum, Savannah, Georgia, USA
- 2016: Other Voices, Other Cities, SCAD Atlanta: Gallery 1600, Georgia, USA
- 2017: Can't Forget, Can't Remember, Apartheid Museum, Johannesburg, South Africa
- 2017: Being There: South Africa, a contemporary scene, Foundation Louis Vuitton, Paris, France
- 2017: Messages from the Atlantic Passage, Installation, Basel Unlimited, Basel, Switzerland
- 2025: There’s something I must tell you: a retrospective exhibition, Iziko South African National Gallery, Cape Town, South Africa

== Publications ==
In 1997, Williamson established ArtThrob, an online publication that features the work of contemporary South African artists.

- South African Art Now. New York: Collins Design. 2009. ISBN 978-0061343513.
- Fabienne Dumont; Linda Givon, eds. (2003). Sue Williamson: Selected Work. Juta. ISBN 978-1-919930-24-4.
- Art in South Africa: The Future Present. Cape Town: David Philip. 1996.
- Resistance Art in South Africa. Juta. 2010. ISBN 978-1-919930-69-5.

== General references ==
- Grania Ogilvy, Dictionary of South African Sculptors and Painters, Everard Read, 1989.
- Betty La Duke, Africa through the Eyes of Women Artists, Africa World Press, 1991.
- Richard J Powell, Black Art and Culture in the 20th Century, World of Art Series, Thames & Hudson, 1997.
- Philippa Hobbs & Elizabeth Rankin, Printmaking in a transforming South Africa, David Philip Publishers, Cape Town, 1997.
- Olu Oguibe & Okwui Enwezor, Reading the Contemporary: African Art from Theory to Marketplace, MIT Press, 1999.
- Sidney Littlefield, Contemporary African Art, Thames & Hudson, 1999.
- N'Gone Fall & Jean Pivin, Anthologie de l'Art Africain du Xxe Siecle, Revue Noir, 2001.
- Gurney, Kim (November 2003). "Sue Williamson". Artthrob (75).
- Nicholas M. Dawes, Sue Williamson: Selected Work, Juta and Company Ltd, 2003.
- Emma Bedford and Sophie Perryer, 10 Years 100 Artists: Art In A Democratic South Africa, Struik, 2004.
- Petra Stegmann, Sue Williamson in Culturebase, 2007.
- Jason, Stefanie (31 May 2013). "Sue Williamson celebrates an enduring female legacy". The M&G Online.
- Gevisser, Mark (2015). Sue Williamson: Life and Work. Skira. ISBN 978-88-572-2867-9.
