= Isabel Clarisa Millan Garcia =

Museum curator (1910–1990)

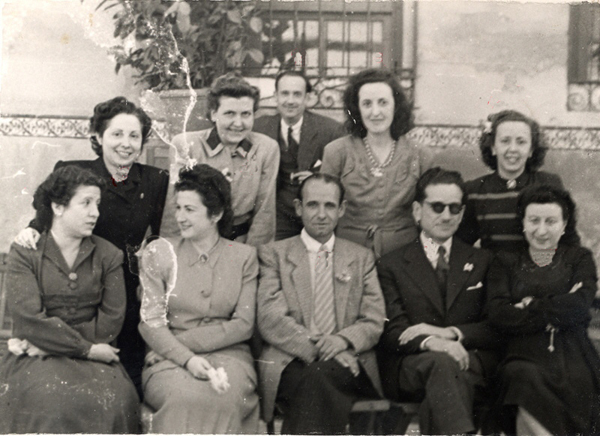
Isabel Garcia pictured with archaeologists during the 1933 Cruise through the Mediterranean

Isabel Clarisa Millan Garcia (18 February 1910-14 June 1990) was a Spanish archaeologist and museum curator from Madrid, Spain. She was born in Calatayud, Spain and died in Madrid, where she attended college and spent much of her career.

== Education and work ==
=== Education ===
Isabel Garcia attended college in Madrid, Spain at Universidad Central (Universidad de Madrid), which is since renamed Complutense University of Madrid. She graduated in 1936 with a degree in Philosophy and Letters. At Universidad Central, Garcia was hired by her professor of the Seminary of Primitive History, Julio Martinez Santa-Olalla, to work on archaeology exhibitions and in different museum positions. Julio Santa-Olalla was the head director of the General Comissariat for Archaeological Excavations (GCAE).

=== Work ===
Garcia spent most of her career at the National Archaeological Museum in Madrid (1941-1978.)

In 1940, Garcia worked with Santa-Olalla at the GCAE as a technical collaborator. In 1941, she began working for the National Archaeological Museum (MAN). That same year she briefly worked as a director for the Archaeological Museum of Soria, now renamed the Numantine Museum of Soria, before transferring back to the MAN in 1942. At MAN, Garcia worked primarily in the department for numismatics. In 1949, she was promoted to Head of the numismatics section. Between 1952 and 1954, she also worked for the Old Age department and the National Documentary and Bibliographic Information Service. As a curator, her job required research, cataloging, organizing and writing about museum installations and exhibitions, and writing reports and memoirs for different collections.

On 5 July 1978, Garcia left the MAN for the Museum of Artistic Reproductions (Reproductions Museum Bilbao).

== Personal life ==
Garcia worked as an archaeologist in the 1940s, after the Spanish Civil War. During this time, archaeology was slowly expanding its workforce. It was previously a difficult job to find as a woman, and often involved unpaid work. About 70% of all Spanish museum workers in the 1940s were women. However, this occupation slowly became less favorable, by the 1960s only 20% of Spanish museum workers were women.

Garcia never married, which was common for many female archaeologists and other University educated women during the period after the Spanish Civil War.

== Achievements ==
Garcia was recognized with the San Isidro Institute Foundation Award in October 1931.

Garcia was part of the Universidad Cruise through the Mediterranean on Ciudad de Cádiz, organized by the Spanish government. The excavation was a 48-day archaeological tour through the Mediterranean that took place through June and July in 1933. On the exhibition, about 200 students and teachers observed cultural differences, discussed the effects of colonialism, religion, and politics in the Mediterranean. They visited Tunisia, Malta, Egypt, Palestine, Jerusalem, Turkey, Greece, Italy, and Mallorca. During her time on the cruise, she wrote letters to her family and documented the trip through her writing.

During her time at the MAN, Garcia was also involved in international conventions including the Protohistory in Florence in 1950, the Numismatics in Rome in 1961, and the Anthropological and Ethnological Sciences in Moscow in 1964.

In 1977, she was recognized in a museum merit contest.
