= Bongiwe Dhlomo-Mautloa =

South African printmaker and arts administrator

Bongiwe or Bongi Dhlomo-Mautloa OIS, (born 1956) is a Zulu South African printmaker, arts administrator and activist.

She was born in Vryheid, KwaZulu-Natal, and educated at St Chad's School in Ladysmith and Inanda Seminary School. She furthered her studies at Rorke's Drift Art and Craft Centre studying printmaking and gained a diploma in fine arts. She worked at the African Art Centre in Durban (1980-1983), then at the Grassroots Gallery in the same city, before moving to Johannesburg where she curated exhibitions at the FUBA Gallery and the Goodman Gallery. She was a founder and project co-ordinator of the Alexandra Art Centre in Johannesburg. She was Outreach and Development Project Coordinator of the 1995 Johannesburg Biennale, which was called Africus, and was the administrator of the 1997 event, titled Trade Routes: History and Geography.

She has said that the Soweto uprising of 1976, when she was aged 20, politicised her, and her prints have been described as "always political, documenting such historical events as the 1976 Soweto uprising as well as less overtly political activities such as women working". Her work has appeared in Staffrider magazine.

She is married to visual artist Kagiso Mautloa.

In April 2023, Dhlomo-Mautloa was bestowed the National Order of Ikhamanga (Silver) by the South African Government for her contributions to arts.

== Exhibitions ==
2022: When Rain Clouds Gather: Black South African Women Artists, 1940–2000, The Norval Foundation, Cape Town. (Curated by Portia Malatjie and Nontobeko Ntombela) - Group exhibition

2022: Yakhalinkomo. Javett- UP Gallery, University of Pretoria, Tshwane. (Curated by Tumelo Mosaka with Sipho Mndanda as Co-Curator and Phumzile Twala as Research and Education Coordinator) - Group Exhibition

2018: FUBA: Preserving a Legacy, Keyes Art Mile, Johannesburg.

2017: A Labour of love, Johannesburg Art Gallery, Johannesburg.

2015: A Labour of Love, Weltkulturen Museum, Frankfurt, Germany.

2014: Impressions of Rorke’s Drift – The Jumuna Collection, Iziko South African National Gallery, Cape Town.

2012: A Fragile Archive, Johannesburg Art Gallery, Johannesburg.

2010: Strengths and Convictions: The Lives and times of South Africa’s Nobel Peace Prize Laureates, Iziko South African National Gallery, Cape Town; Nobel Peace Centre, Oslo.

2003: Rorke’s Drift: Empowering Prints 1962 – 1982, Iziko South African National Gallery, Cape Town; Durban Art Gallery, Durban.

2003: Time, Memory and Desire, Standard Bank Art Gallery, Johannesburg.

1999: [Rewind] Fast Forward.za, Van Reekum Museum of Modern Art, Apeldoorn, Netherlands.

1998: Trans Figurative, Association of Visual Arts Gallery, Cape Town.

1989 – 1990: Art/Images in Southern Africa, Kulturhuset, Stockholm.

1988: The Neglected Tradition, Johannesburg Art Gallery, Johannesburg.

1986: Images of South Africa (solo exhibition), Gaborone.

== Publications ==
2004: Dhlomo, B and Godby, M “Art and Politics in a Changing South Africa: Bongi Dhlomo in Conversation with Michael Godby."African Arts, vol. 37, no. 4.
