= Adam Madebe =

Zimbabwean artist

- Born: 1954 (age 71–72); Bulawayo
- Education: Mzilikazi Art & Craft Centre

Adam Madebe (born 1954) is a visual artist, frequently credited as one of Zimbabwe's most known sculptors working in metal. He lives and works in Johannesburg, South Africa.

== Early life and education ==
Adam Madebe was born in Bulawayo, Zimbabwe. While training at Mzilikazi Art & Craft Centre, he began sculpting figurines in clay. Around 1970, metal became his chosen medium to realise his desire to make larger works. He subsequently became an art instructor at Mzilikazi Art & Craft Centre, teaching ceramics from 1974 through 1992.

== Career ==
Madebe began sculpting in 1982 and has earned many awards for his works, including the notable President’s Award for Excellence in 1994. His sculptures, which are often life-size or larger, are part of prestigious collections across the world with some of his works such as his Fallen Warrior shown at the British Museum, still used as case studies for fine art students in Zimbabwe today.

He has received commissions for public sculptures in Zimbabwe, South Africa and Botswana, including a brass sculpture of Mahatma Gandhi (2015), unveiled in Rustenburg. The subject of an educational television programme made for Channel 4, he is known primarily for his figurative work, but has also achieved great acclaim for his semi-figurative and conceptual work such as 'Hot Seat' (1989). This and other works by this artist were shown at the 1:54 Contemporary African Art Fair in Somerset House in London in October 2015.

== Workshops ==
Adam Madebe participated in the 1989 Pachipamwe II Workshop held at Cyrene Mission outside Bulawayo, Zimbabwe alongside the successful artists Joram Mariga, Bernard Matemera, Bill Ainslie, Voti Thebe, Sokari Douglas Camp and David Koloane.

He was then invited by the Triangle Arts Trust to attend their annual workshop in Pine Plains, New York State in 1990 and in 1995 attended an International Artists Workshop at the Yorkshire Sculpture Park.

== Controversy ==
In 1985, Adam Madebe won the Tower Gardens Sculpture Competition in Bulawayo with his figurative 3.5-metre-tall (11 ft) sculpture, 'Looking To The Future'. This male nude work generated significant local discussion about its suitability for public display in a somewhat conservative country. It was summarily removed from the Gardens. Later displayed within the internal Gallery courtyard of the magnificent fully renovated National Gallery of Zimbabwe at Douslin House, it again fell foul of local governmental censorship in 2010 and once again remains hidden with a storeroom.

== Awards ==
- 1st prize Tower Gardens Sculpture Competition, Bulawayo, Zimbabwe with 'Looking To The Future'
- 1st Prize, WeldArt 87, Harare, Zimbabwe, with 'Jacket'
- Award Of Merit, Zimbabwe Heritage Exhibition 1988, Harare, Zimbabwe with ' Contemplation'
- 2nd Prize, WeldArt 89, Harare, Zimbabwe, with 'Togetherness'
- Award Of Merit, Zimbabwe Heritage Exhibition, Harare, Zimbabwe with 'Hot Seat'
- President's Award Of Honour, Zimbabwe Heritage, Harare, Zimbabwe 1994
