= Sam Nhlengethwa =

South African artist (born 1955)

- Born: Jabulani Sam Nhlengethwa; January 9, 1955; Payneville Township, Springs, Gauteng
- Education: Art and Craft Centre, Rorke’s Drift; Johannesburg Art Foundation
- Occupations: Artist, educator
- Organization: Bag Factory Artists’ Studio
- Known for: Collage art
- Style: Photogravure and lithographs

Sam Nhlengethwa is a South African creative collage artist and the co-founder of Bag Factory Artists' Studio.

== Early life and education ==
Born in Payneville township of Springs in Gauteng, he relocated early with his family to Kwa-Thema and spent his childhood with his grandmother in Ratanda. Being born into a family of jazz lovers, Nhlengethwa's work was inspired by jazz and townships he grew up in. He began collecting jazz records from the age of 17 and started assembling his art collection in 1977 while in school and swapped his own work for those of his schoolmates. In his own art, he drew inspiration from the townships where he grew up. He attended the Rorke's Drift and studied at the Johannesburg Art Foundation and the Mofolo Art Centre in Soweto.

== Work and career ==
Nhlengethwa began his career in 1976 and later taught part-time at the Johannesburg-based Federative Union of Black Artists (FUBA). While studying at the Mofolo Art Centre in Soweto, he participated in Thupelo and Triangle workshops. He co-founded the Bag Factory Artists’ Studio in Johannesburg in 1991 to provide studio space and artistic resources to black artists. He won the Standard Bank Young Artist award in 1994, and worked as a television technician for South African Broadcasting Corporation for 13 years.

His works are exhibited throughout globally with collections at the Johannesburg Art Gallery, the Iziko South African National Gallery, the Durban Art Gallery and numerous others. He is represented by the Goodman Gallery in South Africa.

== Style ==
Jazz is rhythmic and it emphasizes interpretation rather than composition. There are deliberate tonal distortions that contribute to its uniqueness. My jazz collages, with their distorted patterns, attempt to communicate all of this.

— Sam Nhlengethwa

Nhlengethwa collage style niche uses hard-edge cut out and cut up shapes of ready-made images from selected reproductions and juxtaposed to make new images, often combined with other media to create new forms. He also work with photogravure and lithographs. In his prints and paintings, he uses overlays of techniques such as collage painting, drawing and photography.

== Artworks ==
Sam Nhlengethwa had created 277 artworks which includes:

- 2018 Inspired by Romare Bearden and Ernest Cole
- 2018 Waiting for Green
- 2018 ...to be rescued I & II
- 2019 The Market Square
- 2019 Park Station
- 2019 JSE in Winter
- 2019 South side of Constitution Hill
- 2013 Stand Accused
- 2014 Tribute to Ephraim Ngatane

=== Galleries ===
- Goodman Gallery, Johannesburg
- Goodman Gallery, Cape Town
- Goodman Gallery, London

=== Exhibitions ===
He had been featured in 23 exhibitions globally including:

- 2020 Interiors continued, Goodman Gallery, London
- 2019 Joburg Selected, Goodman Gallery, Johannesburg
- 2018 Feedback: Art, Africa and the 1980s, Iwalewahaus, Bayreuth, Germany
- 2014 Earth Matters: Land as Material and Metaphor in the Arts of Africa, Fowler Museum at UCLA, Los Angeles, California, USA
- 2013 Group Exhibition: My Joburg, La Maison Rouge, 12e, Paris, France
- 2010 12th International Cairo Biennale, Cairo Biennale, Cairo, Egypt
- 2009 Abstract South African Art from the Isolation Years: Part 3, SMAC Art Gallery, Stellenbosch, South Africa

=== Selected solo exhibitions ===
He had been featured in 6 solo exhibitions including:

- 2018 Sam Nhlengethwa: Waiting, Goodman Gallery, Cape Town, South Africa.
- 2017 In Focus: Sam Nhlengethwa, University of Michigan Museum of Art, Ann Arbor, Michigan, USA.
- 2014 Sam Nhlengethwa: Some Final Tributes, Goodman Gallery, Johannesburg, South Africa.

=== Selected works at auction ===
Sam Nhlengethwa's work has realized prices ranging from $81 USD to $66,202 USD in auctions (for Glimpses of the Fifties and Sixties in 2019). He has 276 works at auction including:

- 2018 Definitely Waiting for Someone
- 2012 The Launch
- 1988 Bus Stop
- 2006 Brandfort
- 1974 Dedicated to Victor Ndlazilwana
- 1996 Rehearsing
- 2006 Church Street, Kwa Guqa II

=== Art fairs ===
- Frieze New York Online

== Collaborations with printmaking studios ==
In the course of his career, Nhlengethwa had collaborated with various South African printmaking studios namely:

- The Artists’ Press
- Artist Proof Studio
- David Krut Print Workshop
- LL Editions Fine Art Lithography Studio
- MK & Artists Print Workshop
- Mo Editions Printmaking Studio
- Sguzu Printmaker's Workshop
