= Ceza (disambiguation) =

Ceza is a Turkish rapper.

Ceza or CEZA may also refer to:

- the town in South Africa, Ceza, KwaZulu-Natal
- CEZA, the corporation controlling the Cagayan Special Economic Zone
- Miodrag Stojanović "Čeza" of Supernaut (Serbian band)
