= Dals-Långed Church =

- Location of Dals-Långed Church in Västra Götaland County
- 58°55′49.2″N 12°17′43.8″E
- Location: Dals Långed, Västra Götaland County
- Country: Sweden
- Denomination: Church of Sweden
- Website: Dals-Långed Church

History
- Consecrated: 1972

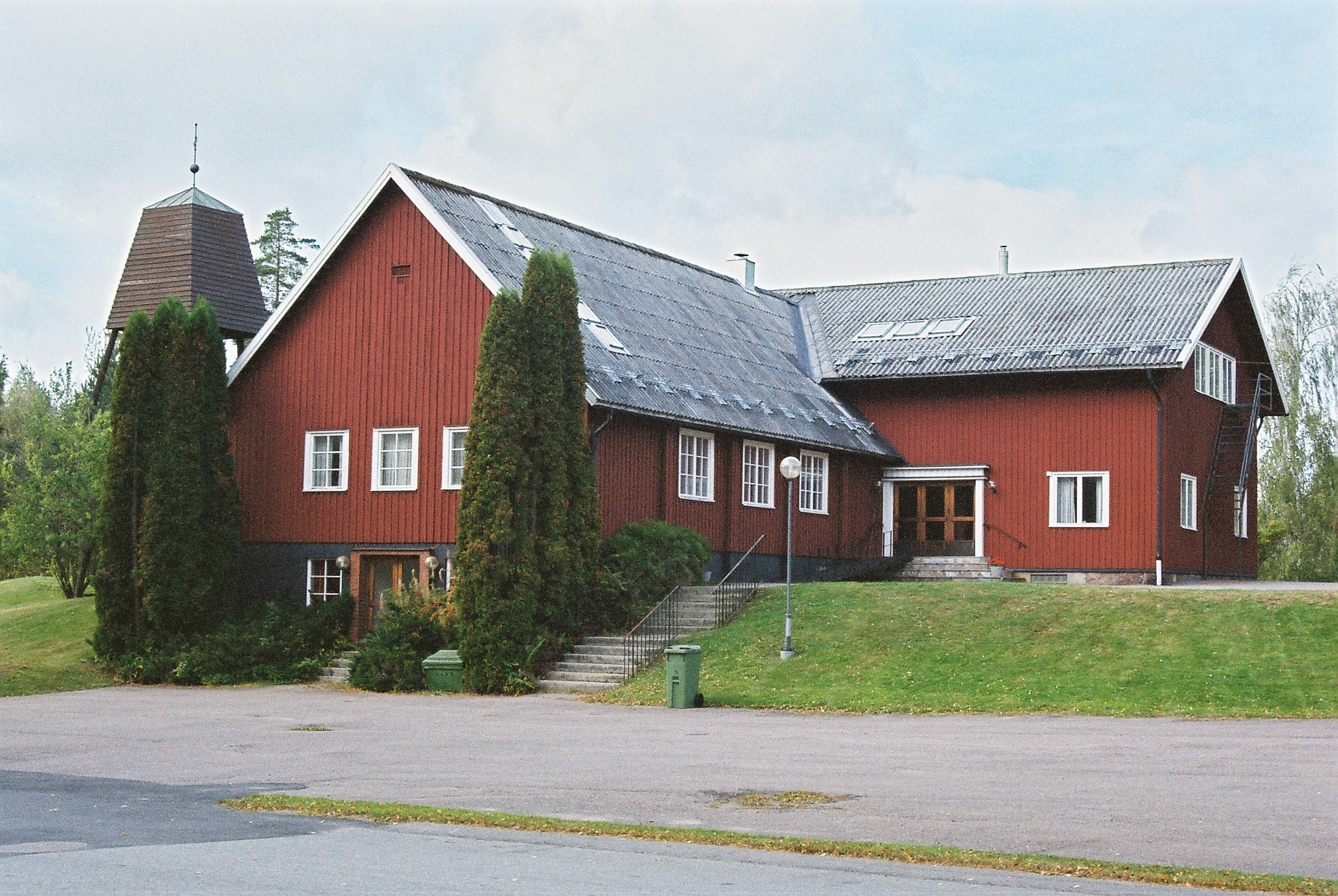
DalsLångedskyrka21500001452171.jpg

Dals-Långed Church (Swedish: Dals-Långeds kyrka) belongs to the Steneby-Tisselskogs parish in the Diocese of Karlstad, Sweden. The church is in the locality of Dals Långed in the Bengtsfors Municipality.

== History ==
Since 1916, the sermons for the people in Dals Långed had been held in a church hall, previously owned by the Mission Covenant Church of Sweden, in Mustadfors. When the church hall was demolished in 1969, the Steneby parish received one of the houses from the disused Långeds school as a gift from Steneby municipality. The school house was originally built in 1880, and was comprehensively renovated, rebuilt and added to under the supervision of architect Verner Johnsson in Bengtsfors. A new extension to the house was made into a church hall. The new church was inaugurated by bishop Gert Borgenstierna in 1972.

The church combined with the parish house is an L-shaped wooden building. The façade is covered with panelling painted with Falu red. The building has a dual-pitched roof covered with eternit. The church hall has an elevated choir in the southeast end. In the northwest end is a folding wall that can be opened and connect the church hall with the parish house. The construction of the hall, based on glued laminated timber is visible on the interior walls and ceiling. A separate wooden bell tower was built in 1976. The tower is an open construction made of tarred beams with a copper-clad roof.

== Furnishings ==
The organ has seven stops and a front made of varnished pine. It was made by Lindegrens orgelbyggeri from Gothenburg in 1973. The organ is placed on the right side in the choir. The altarpiece is a tapestry made in 1978, by Christina Westman in Gothenburg. The baptismal font is a bowl placed in a stand of varnished wood. The font is designed by principle Erik Rudman at the Steneby design school. Instead of a pulpit there is an ambon of varnished wood. The altar is placed versus populum and consists of table made of varnished wood with a light-colored marble top.
