= Sokari Douglas Camp =

London-based Nigerian artist (born 1958)

Sokari Douglas Camp CBE
- Born: 1958 (age 67–68); Buguma, Nigeria
- Education: Central School of Art and Design; Royal College of Art
- Known for: Steel sculpture
- Spouse: Alan Camp
- Awards: 1981: Amy Sadur Friedlander Prize 1982: Saatchi & Saatchi Award 1983: Princess of Wales Scholarship and Henry Moore Foundation bursary 2000: Commonwealth Grant 2005: Commander of the Order of the British Empire (CBE) 2006: Honorary Fellow of the University of the Arts London 2008: Governor, University of the Arts[11] 2017: Honorary Fellowship of SOAS, University of London
- Website: sokari.co.uk

Sokari Douglas Camp CBE (born 1958 in Nigeria) is a London-based artist who has had exhibitions all over the world and was the recipient of a bursary from the Henry Moore Foundation. She was honoured as a Commander of the Order of the British Empire (CBE) in the 2005 Birthday Honours list.

== Biography ==
=== Early years and education ===
Camp was born in Buguma, Nigeria, a Kalabari town in the Niger Delta. She was raised by her brother-in-law, the anthropologist Robin Horton. She studied art at the California College of Arts and Crafts in Oakland, California (1979–80), earned her BA degree at the Central School of Art and Design (1980–83), London, and her MA from the Royal College of Art (1983–86).

She participated in the 1989 Pachipamwe II Workshop held at Cyrene Mission outside Bulawayo, Zimbabwe along with Joram Mariga, Bernard Matemera, Bill Ainslie, Voti Thebe, Adam Madebe and David Koloane.

=== Work and career ===
Her work is predominantly sculpted in steel and takes inspiration from her Kalabari heritage, Nigerian cultures and her life in the UK. She has worked with the Smithsonian and the British Museum and her work is in their permanent collections. Her sculptures are held in other museum collections in Europe, Britain and Japan and private collections throughout the world. She has exhibited internationally in galleries, including in Austria, Great Britain, Cuba, France, Germany, the Netherlands, Japan, Sicily, South Africa, Spain, the United States.

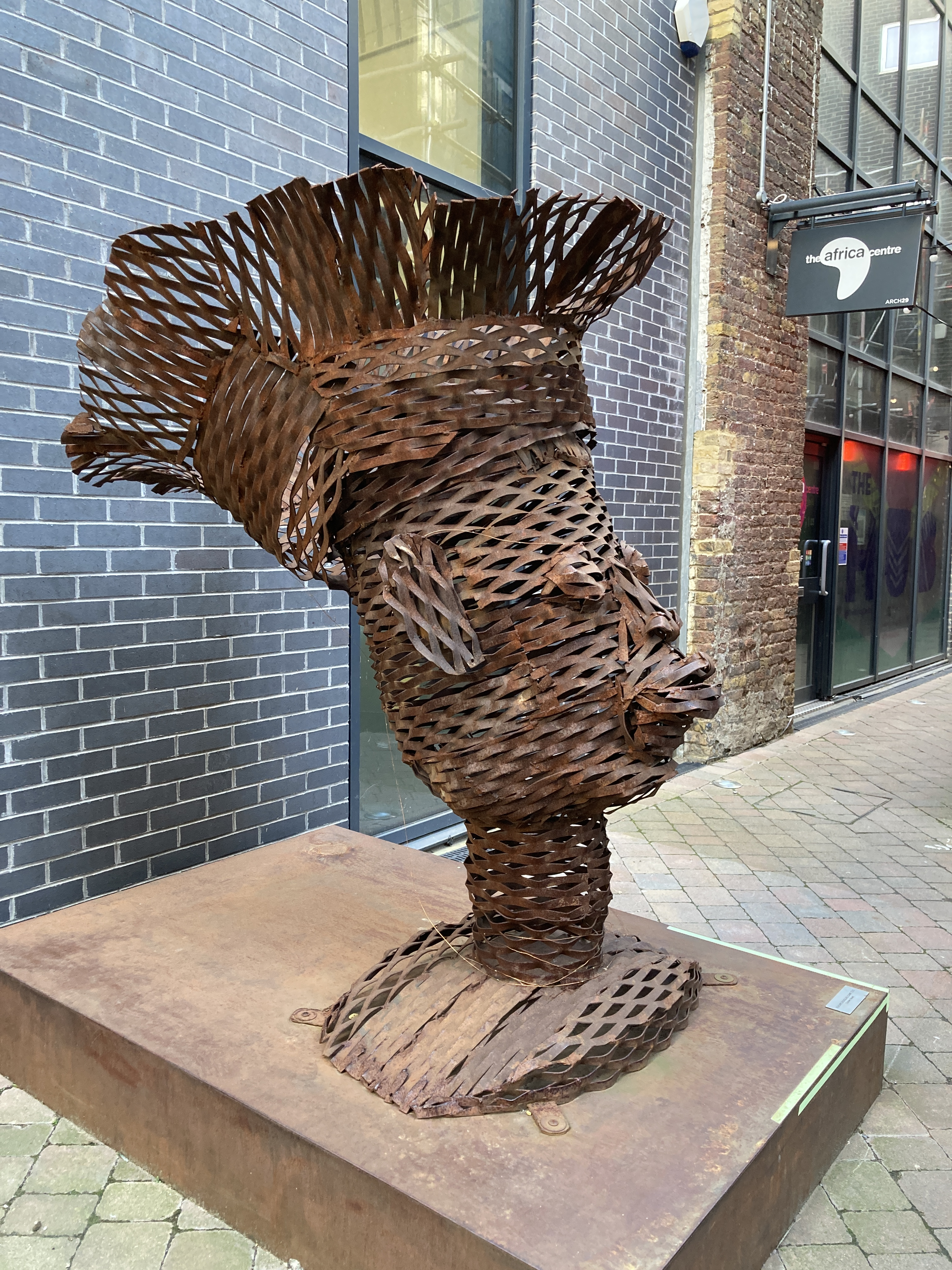
Corten Head sculpture by Camp

Among her notable solo shows are Spirits in Steel – The Art of the Kalabari Masquerade at the American Museum of Natural History, New York (1998–99); and Imagined Steel at The Lowry Arts Centre, Manchester, which toured to the Oriel Mostyn Gallery, Llandudno; Brewery Art Centre, Cirencester; and Derby Museum and Art Gallery (2002–03). In 2005, she collaborated with Ground Force to create work for the Africa Garden at the British Museum, as part of the UK-wide Africa 05 Festival.

In 2003, her proposal NO-O-War No-O-War-R was shortlisted for Trafalgar Square's fourth plinth. She was honoured with a CBE in 2005. She has been awarded many commissions for public memorial sculptures, most notably Battle Bus: The Living Memorial to Ken Saro-Wiwa (2006). In 2012, her sculpture memorial to commemorate slavery, All the World is Now Richer, was exhibited in The House of Commons.

Her piece Green Leaf Barrel (2014) was inspired by the fact that her home, Niger Delta, was struggling because of insignificant jobs and a significant amount of pollution. The figure of the woman represents a woman god who is creating growth from an oil barrel split in two. While creating this piece, she wanted to focus on the positive as she felt that the negatives are often so big that they take up more of our conversation. Her work was featured in the 2015 exhibition No Colour Bar: Black British Art in Action 1960–1990 at the Guildhall Art Gallery. In 2016, her work Primavera was shown at the October Gallery (7 April – 14 May 2016).

More recent shows include Sokari Douglas Camp CBE: Jonkonnu - Masquerade, shown at the October Gallery 23 June–3 July 2022, a solo exhibition of new work exploring the art of masquerade within Africa and its diaspora.

=== Personal life ===
Camp is married to the architect Alan Camp and has lived in London for many years.

== Awards ==
- 1981: Amy Sadur Friedlander Prize
- 1982: Saatchi & Saatchi Award
- 1983: Princess of Wales Scholarship and Henry Moore Foundation bursary
- 2000: Commonwealth Grant
- 2005: Commander of the Order of the British Empire (CBE)
- 2006: Honorary Fellow of the University of the Arts London
- 2008: Governor, University of the Arts
- 2017: Honorary Fellowship of SOAS, University of London

== Solo exhibitions (pre-1996) ==
- Sokari Douglas Camp: Alali, Ikon Gallery, Birmingham (1985)
- Echoes of the Kalabari: sculpture by Sokari Douglas Camp, National Museum of African Art, (The Smithsonian Institution) Washington (1988)
- Sokari Douglas Camp: new work, Sue Williams Gallery, London (1991)
- Play and Display, Museum of Mankind, London (1995)

== Group exhibitions (pre-1996) ==
- New Horizons, South Bank Centre, London (1985)
- Conceptual Clothing, Ikon Gallery, Birmingham (1986)
- From Two Worlds, Whitechapel Art Gallery, London (1986)
- Influences, South London Art Gallery, London (1988)
- Time & Motion, Laing Art Gallery, Newcastle-Upon-Tyne (1989)
- Art for Amnesty: A Contemporary Art Auction, Bonhams, London (1991)

== Portraits ==
A 2006 photograph of Sokari Douglas Camp by Sal Idriss is part of the National Portrait Gallery collection. A 2009 terracotta was exhibited at Yorkshire Sculpture Park in 2013 as part of the Sculpture Series Heads – Contributors to British Sculpture.

Forty-one photographs taken by Phil Polglaze at the South London Art Gallery on 8 September 1988 during the private view of the exhibition Influences: The Art of Sokari Douglas Camp, Keith Piper, Lubaina Himid, Simone Alexander, Joseph Olubo, Brenda Agard. Several photographs are of the artists with his or her artwork, including Douglas Camp.
