= David Koloane =

South African artist (1938–2019)

David Nthubu Koloane
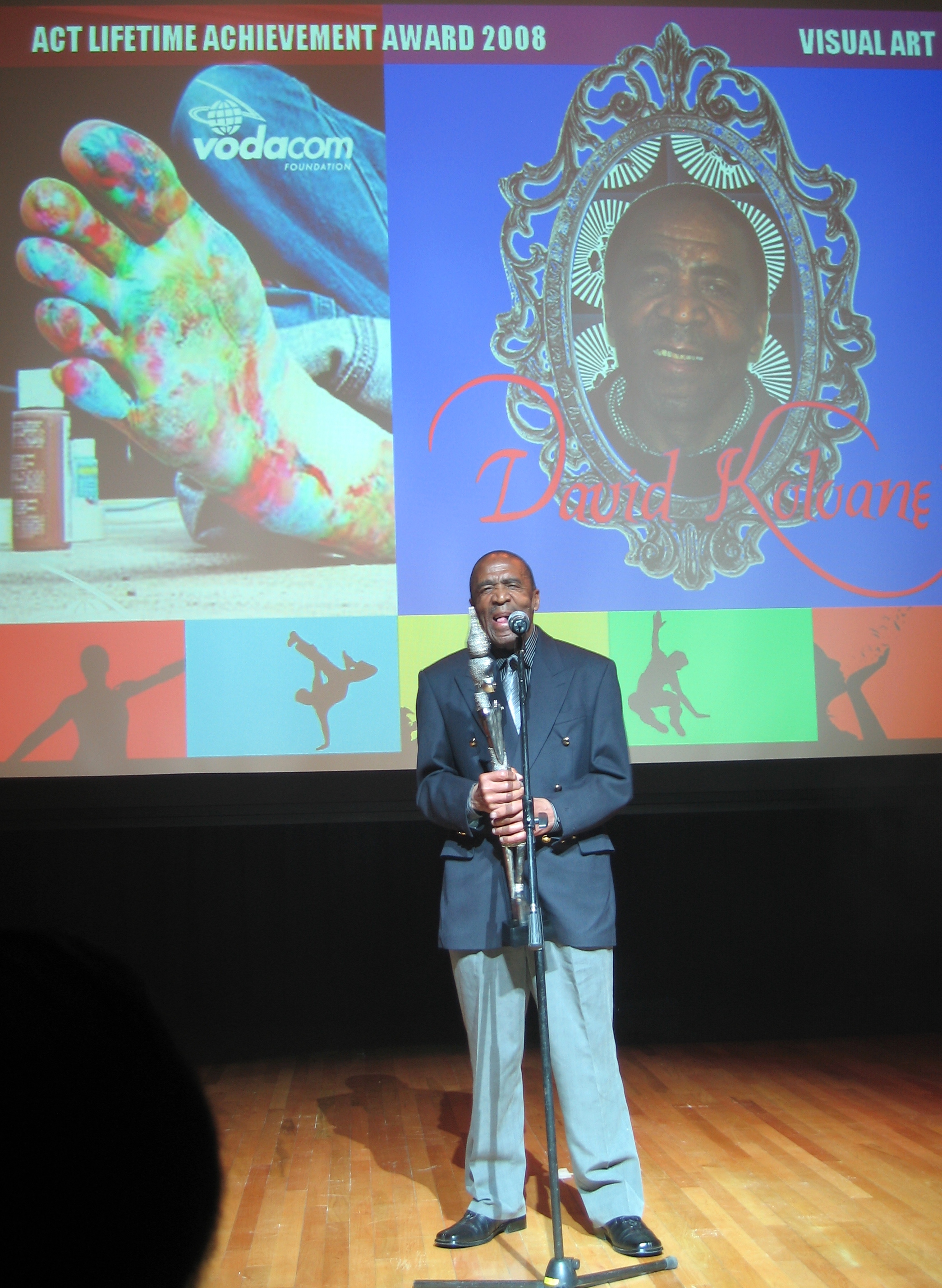
- Koloane at the ACT Lifetime Achievement Award ceremony
- Born: 5 June 1938; Alexandra, South Africa
- Died: 30 June 2019 (aged 81); Johannesburg, South Africa
- Education: Johannesburg Art Foundation (previously Bill Ainslie Studios)
- Known for: Drawings, Paintings, Collages
- Awards: PhD in art, Rhodes University

David Nthubu Koloane (5 June 1938 – 30 June 2019) was a South African artist. In his drawings, paintings and collages he explored questions about political injustice and human rights. Koloane is considered to have been "an influential artist and writer of the apartheid years" in South Africa.

== Life ==
David Koloane was born on June 5th,1938, in the township of Alexandra, a suburb of Johannesburg in South Africa. His passion for arts began developing early during his high school years in Soweto, where he met an artist by the name of Louis Maqhubela. Louis gave Koloane his first art lessons, sparking his initial interest in the field. Around this time Koloane's father suffered from a stroke, and was left unable to work. As a direct result, Koloane dropped out of high school to support his family. From then on, Koloane spent his leisure time creating art, as a hobby. These events establish the beginning of David Koloane's visual arts career, which spanned over 60 years.

Between the years 1974-1977, Koloane attended art classes at the Bill Ainslie Studios, which later became the Johannesburg Art Foundation. In 1977, Koloane was one of the founding members of the first black gallery in South Africa, located in Johannesburg. His ever-increasing dedication to art led him to start teaching part-time at a high school in a township, which eventually transitioned to full-time teaching. In the following years, Koloane remained active and committed to his craft.

In 1982, he co-curated the Culture and Resistance Arts Festival in Botswana. Koloane studied at the University of London from 1984 to 1985 and earned a diploma in museology. From 1986 through 1988, he served as the first curator for the Federated Union of Black Artists (FUBA) Art Gallery in Johannesburg. In 1998, the government of The Netherlands honored David with The Prince Claus Fund Award for his devotion to aiding the development of South African visual arts. Shortly after these events, he co-ordinated and co-curated the Zabalaza Festivals in London, England in 1990. Koloane also created an artist residency called Bag Factory with collector Robert Loder in an area not strictly black or white during Apartheid segregation in 1991. Artists Sam Nhlengethwa and Kagiso Patrick Mautloa were the first resident artists and it went on to host William Kentridge, Helen Sebidi, Penny Siopis, Wayne Barker, Benon Lutaaya and Deborah Bell among many.

He participated in the 1989 Pachipamwe II Workshop held at Cyrene Mission outside Bulawayo, Zimbabwe alongside prominent artists including Joram Mariga, Bernard Matemera, Bill Ainslie, Voti Thebe, Sokari Douglas Camp and Adam Madebe.

David Koloane's works are part of many collections worldwide, including the collections of the Johannesburg Art Gallery, The Contemporary African Art Collection (CAAC) of Jean Pigozzi, the South African National Gallery in Cape Town and the Botswana National Museum.

The David Koloane Award was established in 2010 to celebrate the life and career of Dr. David Koloane as the respected artist, curator, writer, and founding member of the Bag Factory Artists' Studios. The award honors Dr. Koloane's contributions to the arts industry and supports emerging artists who share his passion and dedication.

Recipients of the award are offered a three-month residency at the Bag Factory Artists' Studios, which includes a studio space, a materials stipend, mentorship from the Bag Factory and established artists, and culminates in a solo exhibition of a new body of work in the Bag Factory gallery. This award has provided valuable opportunities for artists to develop their skills and showcase their work, and has paved the way for numerous artists over the last few years.

== Work philosophy ==
Koloane had a wide-ranging work area: as an artist, he always connected his own works to respective social controversies; furthermore, he contributed to various catalogues, curated exhibitions, was part of jury boards several times – amongst others in the advisory board of the National Arts Council, and published many articles both in South Africa and internationally. In 1998, Koloane was honored with a Prince Claus Award for his contribution to the development of art in South Africa.

He states about his work: "My concern in socio-political matters and contributions to the furtherance of disadvantaged black South African artists during and after the apartheid era is evident. My work can be said to reflect the socio-political landscape of South Africa both past and present. The socio political conditions created by the apartheid system of government have to a large extent transfixed the human condition as the axis around which my work evolves. The human figure has become the icon of creative expression".

== Exhibitions (selection) ==
- 1977 Nedbank Gallery Killarney, Johannesburg, South Africa
- 1977 The Gallery, Johannesburg, South Africa
- 1978 Black Expo ‘78, Johannesburg, South Africa
- 1979 Gallery 101, Johannesburg, South Africa
- 1979 Bill Ainslie Studios, Gallery, Johannesburg, South Africa
- 1982 Art towards social development, National Gallery and Museum, Gaborone, Botswana
- 1984 Stockwell Studio exhibition, London, UK
- 1985 Gallery 198, London, UK
- 1985 Fuba Gallery, Johannesburg, South Africa
- 1986 Historical perspective of Black South African artists French Alliance, Pretoria, South Africa
- 1987 Portraits: UNISA Art Gallery, Pretoria, South Africa
- 1987 Contemporary Black artists Academy Art Gallery, Paris, France
- 1988 Pachipamwe international artists workshop Zimbabwe National Gallery Harare, Zimbabwe
- 1989 The Neglected Tradition Exhibition, Johannesburg Art Gallery, Johannesburg, South Africa
- 1989 African encounter, Dome Gallery, New York City
- 1990 Art from South Africa Museum of Modern Art, Oxford, UK
- 1990 South African Mural Exhibition, I.C.A. Gallery London, UK
- 1990 Gallery on the Market, with Michael Zondi, Johannesburg, South Africa
- 1999/2000 Galerie Seippel, Cologne, Germany, Global Art - South African Contemporary Art (group)
- 2000 Liberated Voices Exhibition, Museum of African Art, New York City
- 2001 Goodman Gallery, Johannesburg, South Africa
- 2002 Goodman Gallery, Johannesburg, South Africa
- 2002 Kunstraum Sylt-Quelle, Rantum/Sylt, Germany, Tracing the Rainbow (group)
- 2002 Galerie Seippel, Cologne, Germany, Johannesburg Blues
- 2003 Galerie Seippel, Cologne, Germany, Tracing the Rainbow (group)
- 2003 Goodman Gallery, Johannesburg, South Africa
- 2004 "The ID of South African Artists", Amsterdam, Netherlands
- 2004 Museum Bochum Deutschland, New Identities (group)
- 2008 Museum Goch, Goch, Germany, Works on Paper, hommage to David Kolane's 70th birthday

== Literature ==
- Schamp, Matthias, David Koloane, und Stephan Mann. David Koloane: Arbeiten Auf Papier. Hommage Zum 70. Geburtstag. Kerber Christof Verlag, 2008.
- Kröner, Magdalena, Der Rhythmus der Stadt, Die Malerei David Koloanes, in: Museum Bochum, New Identities - Zeitgenössische Kunst aus Südafrika, S.82ff, 2004, HatjeCantz Verlag ISBN 3-7757-1489-8
- Tadjo, Véronique, und David Koloane, David Koloane (David Krut Pub., 2002).
- Ralf-P. Seippel, Indra Wussow: David Koloane, S. 32 f, in: Tracing the Rainbow, 2002, Seippel Verlag, ISBN 3-9807161-6-3
- Bogatzke, H., R. Brockmann, und C. Ludszuweit. Ondambo: African art forum. Gamsberg Macmillan, 2000. (S. 30–49, S. 174–177)
- Ralf-P. Seippel, David Koloane, Art Dialogue, South Africa - Germany, 1999, ISBN 3-9804967-8-3
- Berman, Esmé. Painting in South Africa. Southern Book Publishers, 1993. (S. 363)
- Deliss, Clémentine, Whitechapel Art Gallery, Malmö konsthall, und Guggenheim Museum Soho. 7 stories about modern art in Africa. Flammarion, 1995. (S. 140–156, S. 261–265)
- Herreman, Frank and D’Amato, Mark. Liberated voices: contemporary art from South Africa. The Museum for African Art, 1999. (S. 27)
- Kasfir, Sidney Littlefield, and Gus Gordon. Contemporary African Art. Paw Prints, 2008. (S. 159–161)

== Awards ==
- 2015 – Doctor of Fine Art (honoris causa), Rhodes University
