= Dals Långed =

- Location within Västra Götaland Location within Sweden
- Coordinates: 58°55′N 12°19′E
- Country: Sweden
- Province: Dalsland
- County: Västra Götaland County
- Municipality: Bengtsfors Municipality

Area
  - Total: 2.57 km^{2} (0.99 sq mi)

Population (31 December 2010)
  - Total: 1,520
  - Density: 590/km^{2} (1,500/sq mi)
- Time zone: UTC+1 (CET)
  - Summer (DST): UTC+2 (CEST)
- Climate: Dfb

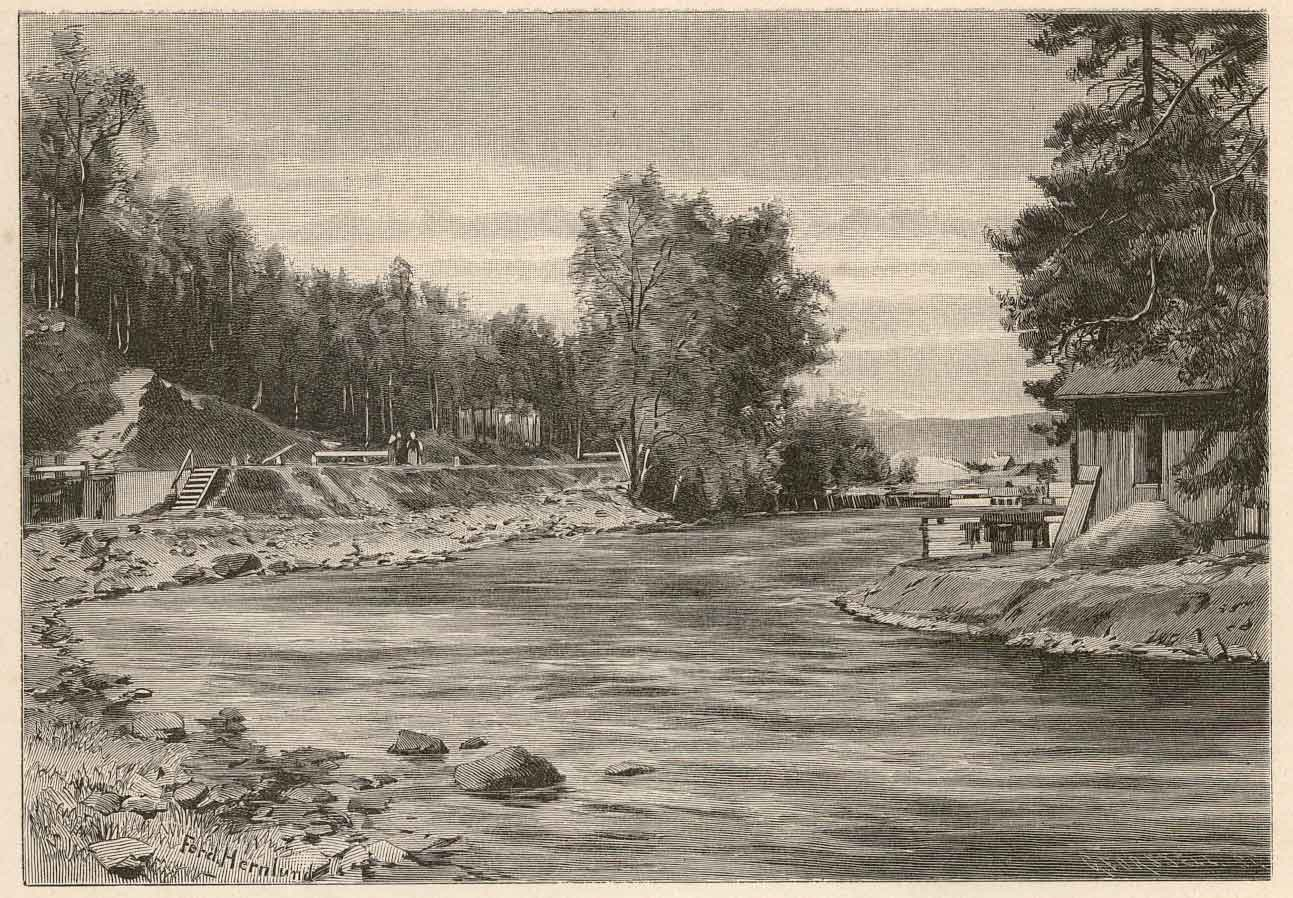
Xylography by G. Forssell based on a painting by Carl Ferdinand Hernlund (1837-1902)

Dals Långed (meaning "passage between or along the water") is a locality situated in Bengtsfors Municipality, Västra Götaland County, Sweden. It had 1,520 inhabitants in 2010.

== History ==
Dals Långed was founded in the 1850s. Later, a mill was built, which however was replaced, on the initiative of future Minister of Finance Carl Fredrik Wærn, by a pulp mill built by a subsidiary of Baldersnäs manor. When completed, Långed factory was one of Sweden's largest wood mills. A subsequent recession decreased the provision of paper pulp, and the managing director Alexander Hall Ings founded Dalsland's first paper mill in 1884. The need for pulp soon exceeded that which the sawmill could provide, and a sulphite mill was built in 1888. When the Baldersnäs company was dissolved in 1897 Långeds became an independent company. The sulphite mill burned down in 1902. Since the factory's capacity was at that time considered too low and production costs too high it was not rebuilt until 1906, whereafter production ceased after a few years. A hydroelectric plant was built during 1909-10. In 1918 Långed merged with Billingsfors bruk to form Billingsfors-Långed AB: Götabanken received a majority shareholding. The depression of the early 1930s meant financial hardship for the mill, which was forced to shift production from newsprint to glossy paper of various kinds.

During World War II, when there was a shortage of metal plate, the factory began to produce various forms of packaging paper to replace metal cans. Later paper cups became an important product. A new bleach plant was built in 1943.

A contributing factor to the company's growth was the Dalsland Canal. The canal reached Långed in the 1860s and a terminal was constructed. Dalslands Kanal AB had its office here.

The factory was mothballed in 2015 but production restarted in 2017.

== Society ==
In Dals Långed there are several marinas.

There are two small supermarkets, a physiotherapist, dentist, café, library, art gallery.

Dals-Långed Church is housed in a wooden building, originally constructed as a school house in 1880 and converted into a church in 1972.

Dals Långed has a rich cultural life which can mainly be explained by the arts programs offered in the resort. These are Steneby - School of Craft and Design related Gothenburg University and Steneby Foundation - A preparatory arts education.

== Famous people ==
Pelle and Erik Gustafsson, known from the band Nifelheim and as "brothers hard rock" comes from the Dals Långed. [ 6 ]
