= Deborah Bell =

South African painter and sculptor

- Born: 1957 (age 68–69); Johannesburg, South Africa
- Known for: Painter, sculptor

Deborah Bell (1957, Johannesburg) is a South African painter and sculptor whose works are known internationally.

== Biography ==
Bell earned fine arts degree from the University of Witwatersrand in 1975 and in 1986 she earned Master of Arts at the same university.

Bell has had many solo and group exhibitions in South Africa and abroad. From 1983 to 1989 she lectured at various institutions, including the University of the Witwatersrand and the University of South Africa. She has traveled extensively in Africa, North America and Europe and in 1986 she spent two months working at the Cité Internationale des Arts in Paris. From 1986 to 1997 she collaborated with South African artists William Kentridge and Robert Hodgins on different projects. In 1997, they produced a series of images of Alfred Jarry and William Hogarth works. Together, the three artists have also created works of computer animation.

Deborah Bell is a winner of several awards, her works can be found in public and private collections around the world.

== Solo exhibitions ==
- Alchemy, David Krut, Johannesburg, 2010
- Flux, Goodman Gallery, Cape, 2009
- Objects of Power: memory of metal, memory of wood, Goodman Gallery, Johannesburg, 2007
- Crossings and Monuments, Oliewenhuis Museum, Bloemfontein, 2005
- Crossings and Monuments, Aardklop Festival Potchefstroom University Library Gallery, 2005
- Sentinels, Goodman Gallery, Johannesburg, 2004
- Unearthed, Joao Ferreira Gallery, Cape Town, 2003
- Unearthed, Goodman Gallery, Johannesburg, 2001
- The Journey Home, Art First, London, 2000
- Displacements, Goodman Gallery, Johannesburg, 1998
- Muses and Lamentations, Goodman Gallery, Johannesburg, 1995
- Deborah Bell, Potchesfstroom Museum, 1989
- Deborah Bell, Market Gallery, Johannesburg, 1982

== Group exhibitions ==
2009

- Contemporary Sculpture in the Landscape, Nirox Foundation.
- Collaborations, David Krut, Johannesburg.

2007

- Lift Off II, Goodman Gallery Cape, Cape Town.
- David Krut print workshop, UNISA Art Gallery, Pretoria.

2005

- ART BASEL MIAMI BEACH, Miami Beach, USA, in collaboration with Goodman Gallery.
- Works on Paper, Collaborative prints from David Krut Print Workshop, Franchise Gallery, Johannesburg.
- David Krut Collaborations: 25 Years of Prints and Multiples, National Arts Festival, Grahamstown.

2004

- Earthworks/Claybodies, Sasol Museum Stellenbosch University, Stellenbosch.

2003

- Earthworks/Claybodies, Pretoria Art Museum.
- Earthworks/Claybodies, Standard Bank Centre Gallery, Johannesburg.

2000

- Icons for the Millennium, Atlanta, USA.

1999

- The Paper Show, Goodman Gallery, Johannesburg.
- Emergence, Group Show, National Arts Festival, Grahamstown.
- Artery, A.V.A Gallery, Cape Town – in conjunction with the Goodman Gallery, Johannesburg.
- Artists in residence, Standard Bank National Arts Festival, 25th Anniversary, Grahamstown.

1998

- Earth Hues – Contemporary African Art, Group Show, World Space, Washington DC, USA.
- 4 UNISA Lecturers, Bloemfontein .
- UNISA Art Lecturers, Pretoria Art Museum.

1997

- Images and Form: Prints, drawings and sculpture from Southern Africa and Nigeria, Brunei Gallery, University of London and Edinburgh College of Art, U.K.
- The Gencor Collection, Sandton Art Gallery, and The Grahamstown Festival.
- Kempton Park Metropolitan Substructure Fine Arts Award Show, Kempton Park.
- New Art from South Africa, Talbot Rice Gallery, Edinburgh, U.K.
- Les Arts de la Resistance, (Fin de Siècle a Johannesburg), Galerie Convergence, Galerie Jean-Christian Fradin, Galerie Michel Luneau, Galerie les Petit Murs, Nantes, France.
- Not Quite a Christmas Exhibition, Goodman Gallery, Johannesburg
- CRAM, A.V.A Gallery, Cape Town – in conjunction with Goodman Gallery, Johannesburg
- Collaborations 1986–1997 (11 years of collaborative projects between artists Kentridge, Hodgins and Bell) at the Johannesburg Art Gallery, in association with the FNB Vita Awards.
- ‘UB101:' A portfolio of etchings done in conjunction with Kentridge and Hodgins. Exhibited at the Grahamstown Festival and at the Gertrude Posel Gallery. Exhibition curated by Fiona Rankin-Smith.

1996

- Gay Rights: Rites, Re-writes, Travelling Exhibition, South Africa.
- Group Salon, Rose Korber representing artists at the Bay Hotel, Cape Town.
- Common and Uncommon Ground: South African Art to Atlanta, City Gallery East, Atlanta, USA.
- Vita Awards, Johannesburg Art Gallery.
- Tomorrow is Now, First Canadian Place and Knights Galleries International, Toronto, Canada.
- Barber Signs, The Standard Bank Gallery, Johannesburg.
- Recent Drawings, Gallery on Tyrone, Johannesburg.
- Ceramics Biennal, Sandton Art Gallery

1995

- The Bag Factory: The First Five Years, the Civic Theatre Gallery, Johannesburg.
- The Art of Tea, Kim Sacks Gallery, Johannesburg.

Group Salon, Rose Korber representing artists at the Bay Hotel, Cape Town.

1994

- Group Show, Newtown, Johannesburg.
- Anything Boxed, Group Show, Goodman Gallery, Johannesburg.
- South African works on Paper, Northwestern University, Chicago, United States.
- Memo, installation with video at the Grahamstown festival in collaboration with William Kentridge and Robert Hodgins
- Lamentations, Art First, Cork Street. London.

1993

- Gallery on Tyrone, Johannesburg.
- Vita Awards, Johannesburg Art Gallery, Johannesburg.
- Momentum Life Exhibition, Pretoria.
- Internations of Millennium, Newtown Gallery, Johannesburg.
- Easing the Passing (of the hours), Goodman Gallery, Johannesburg.
- Portraits in the round, ceramic exhibition in collaboration with William Kentridge and Retief van Wyk, Goodman Gallery, Johannesburg.

1992

- ICA, 50 Johannesburg Artists, Johannesburg
- Paris: The Catalyst, Alliance Francaise, Durban.
- Looking at Art: Looking at Watercolours, Goodman Gallery, Johannesburg.
- Vita Awards, Johannesburg Art Gallery, Johannesburg.
- Works made in August, Newtown Gallery, Johannesburg.
- 1992 Easing the Passing (of the hours), Waterfront, Cape Town. Computer Animation, laser prints and drawings in collaboration with William Kentridge and Robert Hodgins.

1991

- Cape Town Triennal.
- Painted People: Painted Spaces, Newtown Galleries, Johannesburg.
- Hand Coloured Graphics, Goodman Gallery, Johannesburg.
- Tiny Tapestry Show, Goodman Gallery, Johannesburg.
- Little Morals, a portfolio of etchings done in conjunction with Hodgins and Kentridge, exhibited at the Cassierer Gallery, Johannesburg, Gallery International Cape Town, Taking Liberties, Durban

1990

- Women choose Women, University of the Witwatersrand, Johannesburg.
- Art from South Africa, MOMA, Oxford, UK.
- Standard Bank Drawing Competition, Johannesburg.

1989

- Volkskas Atelier Award Exhibition, South African Vita Awards, Johannesburg Art Gallery.
- African Encounters, Dome Gallery, New York and Washington, USA.
- The Little Big Show, Goodman Gallery, Johannesburg.

1988

- CASA (Culture for Another South Africa), conference in Amsterdam, Holland.
- Volkskas Atelier Award exhibition, South African Association of the Arts, Pretoria.
- 100 Artists Protest detention without trial, in aid of DPSC, Market Theatre, Johannesburg.
- Artists for Human Rights Exhibition, Durban Exhibition Centre.
- Exhibited with Jenny Stadler and Nagel at the Goodman Gallery, Johannesburg.

1987

- Hogarth in Johannesburg, a portfolio of etchings done in conjunction with Hodgins and Kentridge. This exhibition travelled to all the major centres in South Africa.

1986

- Volkskas Atelier Award Exhibition, South African Association of Arts, Pretoria.

1985

- Cape Town Triennal New Visions, market Gallery, Johannesburg.
- 11 Figurative Artists, Market Gallery, Johannesburg.
- MAFA exhibition, Rembrandt Gallery, Milner Park, Johannesburg.

1983

- Exhibited with Hodgins and Sassoon, Carriage House Gallery.

== Awards ==
- Merit Prize Winner, Volkskas Atelier (1986)
- Life Quarterly Award, Runner-up for the main award (1991)
- Mamba Award for "the Most Sustained Artist" (1991)
- APSA Award for Best New Signature, Ceramics Biennial (1997)

== Bibliography ==
- Pippa Stein, Deborah Bell, Ruth Sack, Deborah Bell, Volume 10 of Taxi Art Series, David Krut Publishing, 2004. ISBN 0958468826
- Deborah Bell, Juliet White, Deborah Bell's Alchemy, David Krut Publishing, 2010. ISBN 0954975243
