= Elizabeth Rankin =

South African emeritus professor of art history in New Zealand

- Born: 23 January 1943

Academic background
- Education: University of the Witwatersrand
- Thesis: Englishmen on the Acropolis: an historiography of the Parthenon, c. 1750-1850 (1978)

Academic work
- Institutions: University of Auckland, University of the Witwatersrand

Elizabeth Anne Rankin is a South African–New Zealand art history academic, and is an emeritus professor at the University of Auckland, specialising in neglected South African artists, and printmaking and sculpture.

== Academic career ==
Rankin completed a PhD titled Englishmen on the Acropolis: an historiography of the Parthenon, c. 1750-1850 at the University of the Witwatersrand in 1978. It was the first PhD in art history awarded by the university. Rankin was appointed as Chair of the History of Art at Witwatersrand in 1982, and later served three years as Dean of Arts.

Rankin was elected Chair of the South African Association of Art Historians in 1985.

Rankin joined the faculty of the University of Auckland in 1998 as professor of art history. She was head of the department, and chair of the exhibitions committee for the university's Gus Fisher Gallery. Rankin's research focuses on neglected South African artists, and sculpture and print-making. Rankin published a history of Rorke's Drift printmakers with Philippa Hobbs in 2003. Rankin and Hobbs have written a biography of South African artist Peter Clarke, published in 2011, along with retrospective exhibitions at the South African National Gallery in Cape Town, and in Johannesburg. Rankin has also written about New Zealand photographers Fiona Pardington, and Neil Pardington. In 2018 she curated an exhibition and catalogue at the Waikato Museum of the work of Michael Shepherd, Reinventing History Painting, and has contributed to catalogues on the work of Marian Maguire, such as The Labours of Herakles and Titokowaru's Dilemma.

In 2012, Rankin was a visiting fellow at the Center for Advanced Studies at LMU Munich, where she worked with Prof. Dr. Rolf Schneider on the design of the frieze of the Voortrekker Monument. Together they published From Memory to Marble: The Historical Frieze of the Voortrekker Monument in 2020.Rankin retired in 2016 and was appointed Professor Emerita at Auckland.

== Selected works ==
=== Books ===
- Baker, Kriselle; Rankin, Elizabeth (2015). Neil Pardington: The Order of Things. Baker + Douglas.
- Hobbs, Philippa; Rankin, Elizabeth (2014). Listening to distant thunder: The art of Peter Clarke. Fernwood.
- Rankin, Elizabeth (2011). Baker, Kriselle (ed.). Fiona Pardington: the pressure of sunlight falling. Otago University Press.
- Rankin, Elizabeth; Hobbs, Phillippa (2003). Rorke's Drift: Empowering prints. Double Storey.
- Rankin, Elizabeth (1994). Images of metal: Post-war sculptures and assemblages in South Africa. Witwatersrand University Press.
- Rankin, Elizabeth; Dell, E; Meintjes, J (1989). Images of wood: Aspects of the history of sculpture in 20th-century South Africa. Johannesburg Art Gallery.
- Hobbs, Philippa; Rankin, Elizabeth (1997). Printmaking in a Transforming South Africa. David Philip Publishers. ISBN 0-86486334-9.

=== Other works ===
- Elizabeth Rankin; Nessa Leibhammer (1996). "Scrambling (for) Africa". African Studies. 55 (2): 182–198. doi:10.1080/00020189608707855. Wikidata Q58174768.
- Elizabeth Rankin (2009). "Mission madonnas imaging an african mother of god". Material Religion: The Journal of Objects, Art and Belief. 5 (1): 111–114. doi:10.2752/175183409x418793. Wikidata Q57095265.
- Elizabeth Rankin; Carolyn Hamilton (1999). "REVISION; REACTION; RE‐VISION; The role of museums in (a) transforming South Africa". Museum Anthropology. 22 (3): 3–13. doi:10.1525/mua.1999.22.3.3. Wikidata Q130300740.
- Elizabeth Rankin; Robert Hodgins (1979). "The Concept of Truth to Material". De Arte. 14 (23): 3–11. doi:10.1080/00043389.1979.11760931. Wikidata Q130300763.
- Elizabeth Rankin (2013). "Creating/Curating Cultural Capital: Monuments and Museums for Post-Apartheid South Africa". Humanities. 2 (1): 72–98. doi:10.3390/h2010072. Wikidata Q130300820.
