= Helen Sebidi =

South African artist (born 1943)

Mmakgabo Mmapula Mmangankato Helen Sebidi
- Born: Mmakgabo Mmapula Mmangankato Helen Sebidi; 5 March 1943 (age 83); Marapyane (Skilpadfontein) near Hammanskraal, South Africa
- Occupation: Artist
- Years active: 1960–present
- Notable work: Tears of Africa (1988)
- Awards: Standard Bank Young Artist Award (1989); The Order of Ikhamanga in Silver (2004); ACT Lifetime Achievement Award (2011); Mbokodo Award (2015)

Mmakgabo Mmapula Mmangankato Helen Sebidi (born 5 March 1943) is a South African artist born in Marapyane (Skilpadfontein) near Hammanskraal, Pretoria, who lives and works in Johannesburg. Sebidi's work has been represented in private and public collections, including at the National Museum of Women in the Arts, Washington and New York, the Smithsonian National Museum of African Art, New York, and the World Bank. Her work has been recognised internationally and locally. In 1989, she won the Standard Bank Young Artist award, becoming the first black woman to win the award. In 2004, President Thabo Mbeki awarded her the Order of Ikhamanga in Silver – which is the highest honor given to those considered a "national treasure". In 2011, she was awarded the Arts and Culture Trust (ACT) Lifetime Achievement Award for Visual Art, while in 2015 she received the Mbokodo Award. In September 2018, Sebidi was honoured with one of the first solo presentations at the Norval Foundation in Cape Town – a retrospective entitled Batlhaping Ba Re.

Her work represents a mode of African modernist painting and sculpture, wherein she depicts her experience of having grown up and living in the South African countryside, and later her experiences as a black artist, living and working under an apartheid regime. Sebidi's portraits often depict abstracted African subjects in bright colours and a rich palette. She is often associated with the realist and quasi-expressionist schools, with her vivid paintings of life in both rural and urban South Africa and similarly striking clay sculptures.

== Early life ==
Mmakgabo Mmapula Helen Sebidi was born in Marapyane, outside Hammanskraal, South Africa. She learned the crafts of murals, knitting and sewing, embroidery and beadwork, and calabash decoration from her grandmother. Sebidi's name, "Mmakgabo", which means "keeper of the flame", refers to her grandmother's work ethic and belief in vocational labor's role in creating community.

Sebidi was born to a working class mother, who was a domestic worker in the city of Johannesburg. As was typical of children born to migrant labourers, Helen was raised in the country side by her grandmother who taught her mural painting and pyroengraving of calabashes. In an interview, the artist speaks about the relevance of seTswana storytelling as imagination and art education:

The old people told us stories...about how people live and...about how to see. They "read" the clouds. We used to sit outside in the courtyard, and especially in the very bright moonlight when there were a lot of clouds they used to read the stories for us and tell us: look at that, look at the soldiers, look at this! And they would tell us: you're going to have to see other life that's coming.

As a teenager, Sebidi became a domestic worker and estranged from her mother and step-father. Sebidi sewed and knitted and decided to pursue her art in her off-time with encouragement from the wife of her employer, who also pushed Sebidi towards formal training. Sebidi exchanged artistic techniques with her employer who in turn demonstrated the application of artistic media such as batik, tie-dye, and oil paintings.

== Career ==
Sebidi took classes at Dorkay House after meeting Jonathan Koenakeefe Mohl by chance. She studied drawing with him, progressing from plants to landscapes to local architecture. Sebidi returned her hometown when her grandmother grew ill in the mid-1970s. She made art about her lineage at the encouragement of Mohl, through her grandmother's death in the early 1980s. Her grandmother let her work in secret and offered historical stories for Sebidi. She made connections with multiple arts organizations and artists Bill Ainslie and David Koloane.

Sebidi explored a number of the limited art training options that were available to her at the time. Sebidi met John Koenakeefe Mohl, a fellow artist and director of the White Studio. Mohl served as Sebidi's mentor and is credited for having encouraged Sebidi to pursue a career as an artist, and urging her to develop an individual idiom, establish an independent style and practice as opposed to emulating that of her peers. In 1980, Sebidi furthered her training by spending eighteen months at the Katlehong Art Centre in the east of Johannesburg. She also spent time at the Johannesburg Art Foundation-a multi cultural centre for art education, under the tutelage of fine artist and director Bill Ainslie. In 1985, she took up a teaching position at the Katlehong Art Centre near Germiston. Between 1986 and 1988 she worked for the Johannesburg Art Foundation while teaching at the Alexandra Art Centre. Her work was part of the group exhibition "Bild/konst i södra Afrika (Art/Images in Southern Africa)" which was shown at the Culture House in Stockholm from 19 May to 19 September 1989 and toured the Nordic countries until May 1990.

In the late 1980s, her works became more abstracted without losing their figurative content. Miracle (1987) and Tears of Africa (1988) were two of her seminal works from this era, both in mixed-media charcoal and depicting "contorted, cramped figures with distorted or multiplied features and faces sometimes meeting at right angles". She received the 1989 Standard Bank Young Artist Award. Her work Don't Let It Go was published in the Decade of Young Artists portfolio.

A common theme in Sebidi's artwork is the return of moral values, especially those associated with precolonial Africa.

== Exhibitions ==
- 2017:

- Batlhaping Ba Re!, Norval Foundation, Cape Town
- They Are Greeting, Standard Bank Gallery, Albany Museum, National Arts Festival, Makhanda, South Africa

- 2016:

- Fundação Bienal de São Paulo, Brazil
- "Mmakgabo Helen Sebidi – An exhibition of paintings and prints", Michaelis Galleries, University of Cape Town, 2016
- "They Are Greeting", Everard Read Gallery, Johannesburg, 2016

- 2013:

- Centenary Exhibition, Everard Read, Johannesburg

- 2010:

- Spier Contemporary 2010, Africa Centre, Cape Town

- 2009:

- Great South African Nude Exhibition, Everard Read, Johannesburg

- 2008:

- Joburg Art Fair 2008 with Everard Read, Johannesburg

- 2004:

- Visible Visions (travelling exhibition): Germany: Hagen, Essen, Berlin and Osnabrueck; Tilburg, the Netherlands

- 2003:

- The Artificial Shelter Foundation, Tilburg, the Netherlands

- 2002:

- Head North: Views from the South African National Gallery Permanent Collection, Iziko South African National Gallery, Sweden
- International world summit exhibition: Tilburg, Netherlands
- International travelling exhibition, 'World Women, Visible Visions from 'International Women', Johannesburg
- Art in the context of the World Earth Summit on sustainable development

- 2001:

- The Markers' exhibition, Venice Biennale, Italy

- 2000:

- Axis Gallery, New York
- University of Illinois, Urbana Champaign, Krannert Art Museum and Kinkead Pavilion

- 1999:

- Changing Screens Exhibition, The Firs, Rosebank, Johannesburg
- Human Rights Institute Exhibition, National Gallery, Durban

- 1994:

- Six women from Southern Africa, Civic Gallery, Johannesburg

- 1993:

- Venice Biennale, Italy
- Graphics Exhibition, Jyväskylä, Finland
- African Hei-ti-@e, Uranienborgveien, Norway
- Women From Africa, Savannah Gallery of Modern Art, Bethnal Green, London, UK
- Standard Bank Young Artists Award Winners Exhibition, Zimbabwe National Gallery, Harare, Zimbabwe

- 1992:

- Art from South Africa, Iziko South African National Gallery, Cape Town
- Future Realisms, The Afrika Futuristic Gallery, Johannesburg
- The Challenge to Colonisation, 4th Havana Biennial, Cuba
- Standard Bank Young Artists Award Winners Exhibition, Namibia

- 1991:

- A Grain of Wheat, Common Wealth Institute, London, UK

- 1990:

- Zabalaza Arts Festival, Institute of Contemporary Arts, London, UK
- Art From South Africa, Museum of Modern Art, Oxford UK

- 1989:

- 1989 Standard Bank National Festival of the Arts, Makhanda
- Cape Town Triennial, toured South Africa

- 1988:

- Art Images in Southern Africa, Stockholm, Sweden
- The Neglected Tradition
- Detainees Parents' Support Committee
- South African Potter's Association

- 1987:

- Standard Bank National Drawing Competition which toured South Africa
- Thupelo Workshop Exhibition, toured to the Johannesburg Art Centre and the National South African Gallery in Durban
- Delfiri/ FUBA Creative Quest Exhibition, Johannesburg
- Vita Art Now, Johannesburg

- 1986:

- Thupelo Workshop Exhibition, Johannesburg
- Art For Alexandra, Sotheby's, Johannesburg
- FUBA, Johannesburg

- 1980-88:

- Washington, D.C.

- 1980-88:

- Brush and Chisel Club

- 1977-88:

- Artists Under the Sun, Parkview, Johannesburg

== Bibliography ==
- Sosibo, Kwaneie (September 23, 2016). "Ancestors and Women Steer Sebidi's Art". Mail and Guardian. Johannesburg. p. 5.
- Leeb-du Toit, Juliette (February 23, 2009). "Mmakgabo Mmapula Mmankgato Helen Sebidi". David Krut. Johannesburg. Archived from the original on July 2, 2013.
