= Philippa Hobbs =

South African art historian, artist, and art collector

- Born: 1955 (age 70–71)
- Citizenship: South African
- Education: University of South Africa Technikon Witwatersrand University of the Arts (Philadelphia) Johannesburg College of Art
- Occupations: Art historian, Artist, Art collector
- Notable work: Three published books

Philippa Hobbs is a South African art historian, artist, and art collector. She was born in 1955 and matriculated at St Andrew's School in 1972. She studied art at the Johannesburg College of Art before finishing a post-graduate printmaking course at the University of the Arts (Philadelphia). She then furthered her studies through University of South Africa (UNISA) and the Technikon Witwatersrand in Johannesburg. Hobbs was a professor of art at the Technikon Witwatersrand from 1979 to 1993, and also the Head of Printmaking there. She has been noted for her contribution to the practice of art (with national and international exhibitions), art education, research, and community development through art. As of 2006, Hobbs has worked as Curator of the MTN Art Collection, a private, corporate art collection in Johannesburg.

== Art ==
Hobbs was invited to contribute to the Images of Human Rights project in 1996, which involved artists making visual representation of each clause of South Africa's Bill of Rights. Hobbs' designated clause was Clause 8: Freedom of Expression, where her woodcut – Received by the Tongue – shows the precarious balance between rights of expression and the subsequent consequences.

Other works by Hobbs include Dracunculus and Cat's Cradle, a woodcut produced in 1993, and Spiritus Candelabrae, a two-colour woodcut produced in 1992.

== Teaching ==
Hobbs established her own printmaking studio, Footprint Studio. There she took classes and workshops. She started the studio in order to offer visual training and printmaking guidance to beginners and advanced artists.

== Publications ==
Hobbs co-published Printmaking in a Transforming South Africa with Elizabeth Rankin in 1997 (David Philip Publishers), which discusses how printmaking has "traversed the divisions of South African art" and describes the technical and expressive components of printmaking, while also exploring the role it played as a form of resistance during the liberation struggle.

In 2003, Hobbs and Rankin published Rorke’s Drift Empowering Prints, which looks at the Evangelical Lutheran Church Art and Craft Centre, more popularly known as Rorke's Drift Art and Craft Centre. Their article reviews the art produced by the black artists who studied at the workshop, including its first-enrolled student Allina Ndebele, whom Hobbs has researched extensively in other publications such as her 2011 Water and Space, 2014 Allina Ndebele’s Tree of Life, and 2018 Mantis Wedding: Performing Power in the Loom.

Hobbs' 2006 publication, Messages and Meaning, is a catalog for the MTN Art Collection of which she is curator. It is a collection of essays by writers such as Nessa Leibhammer, Elizabeth Rankin, Wilma Cruise and other prominent authors. It explores how the collection is "a tool for social investment, an educational resource, a means of inspiring in-house communication and debate, and a showcase of South African and African art to visitors".

Hobbs has also contributed to a well-known South African art publication, Taxi and frequently writes the corresponding Taxi Art Education Supplement for school teachers and learners, allowing the information to be easily accessible. These supplements contain worksheets, information boxes about otherwise challenging art concepts.
