= Goodman Gallery =

Art gallery founded in Johannesburg, South Africa

Coordinates: 26.1493°S 28.0341°E

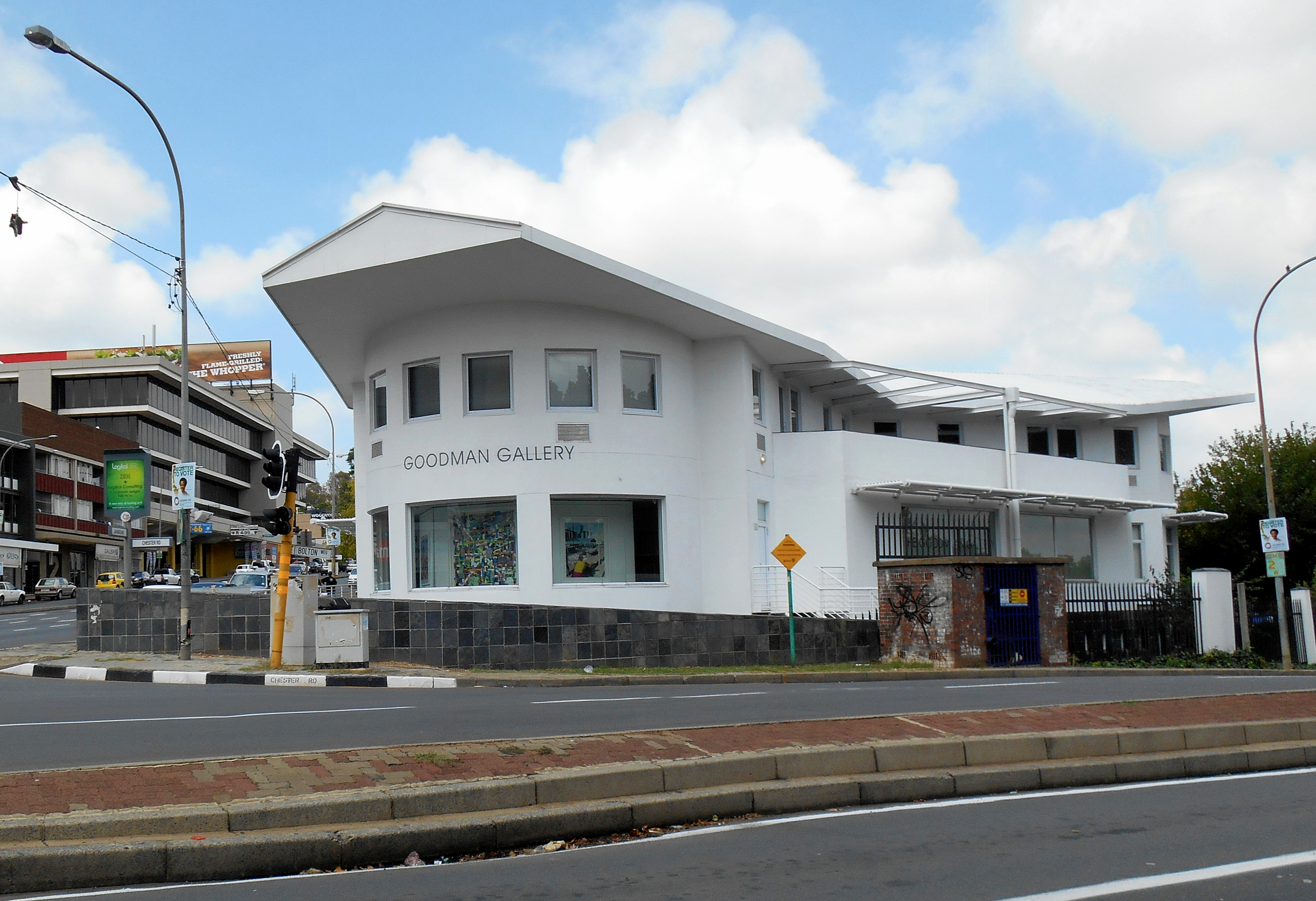
Goodman Gallery, Johannesburg

Goodman Gallery is an art gallery founded in Johannesburg, South Africa by Linda Givon (previously Goodman) in 1966. The gallery operates spaces in Johannesburg, Cape Town, London and New York. It represents both established and emerging artists who are regarded as having helped shape the landscape of contemporary art in Southern Africa.

== History ==
Founded during apartheid, the gallery opened with a show of 30 artists, mostly leading European modernists. It remained a "resolutely non-discriminatory space", protecting its artists and freedom of expression during the political tumult.

Goodman Gallery focuses on collaborating with southern African artists, both established and emerging; those from the greater African continent; and international artists who engage with the African context. South African artists such as David Koloane, David Goldblatt, Sue Williamson and Sam Nhlengethwa have exhibited there.

In 2008, Liza Essers purchased the gallery.

In 2012, South Africa's governing party, the African National Congress, went to court to try to force Goodman Gallery to remove The Spear, a painting by Brett Murray that appeared to depict South Africa's president Jacob Zuma with his genitals exposed. On the morning of 22 May 2012, two men entered the gallery during visiting hours and defaced the painting—first by painting a red cross over the depiction of Zuma's face and genitals and then by smearing black paint over the canvas. The two—Barend la Grange and Lowie Mabokela—were arrested. In exchange for the ANC's agreeing to drop a lawsuit, the gallery agreed to remove the work from the exhibition.

In 2016, Goodman Gallery was named one of 500 best galleries worldwide by Modern Painters. It also celebrated its 50th anniversary the same year with the two-part curatorial mission, In Context, co-curated by Essers and artist Hank Willis Thomas that explored notions of African identity in both the United States and Africa. The gallery hosted the seventh international conference on African and African American art, Black Portraiture[s] III: Reinventions, Strains of Histories and Culture.

Also in 2016, Goodman Gallery signed a permanent lease for Pollen Estate in London.

== Artists ==
Goodman Gallery represents living artists including:

- Ruby Onyinyechi Amanze
- Ghada Amer
- Candice Breitz
- Adam Broomberg & Oliver Chanarin
- Kudzanai Chiurai (since 2011)
- Mounir Fatmi
- David Goldblatt
- Alfredo Jaar
- Samson Kambalu (since 2017)
- William Kentridge
- Grada Kilomba (since 2017)
- Moshekwa Langa
- Liza Lou
- Paulo Nazareth (since 2017)
- Shirin Neshat
- Tabita Rezaire
- Yinka Shonibare (since 2017)
- The Brother Moves On
- Hank Willis Thomas

In addition, the gallery manages various artist estates, including:

- David Koloane

In the past, the gallery has worked with the following artists and estates:

- El Anatsui
- Sydney Kumalo
- Tracey Rose
- Carrie Mae Weems
