= Ceza, KwaZulu-Natal =

Ceza KwaCeza
- Location within KwaZulu-Natal Location within South Africa
- Coordinates: 27.986°S 31.374°E
- Country: South Africa
- Province: KwaZulu-Natal
- District: Zululand
- Municipality: Ulundi
  - Councillor: (IFP)

Area
  - Total: 4.26 km^{2} (1.64 sq mi)

Population (2011)
  - Total: 449
  - Density: 105/km^{2} (273/sq mi)

Racial makeup (2011)
  - Black African: 100.0%

First languages (2011)
  - Zulu: 98.2%
  - Tswana: 1.6%
  - Other: 0.2%
- Time zone: UTC+2 (SAST)
- Postal code (street): 3866
- PO box: 3866
- Area code: 035

Ceza is a town in Zululand District Municipality in the KwaZulu-Natal province of South Africa.

Ceza Hospital is located in this town. It was founded as a mission clinic in 1910. The first doctor arrived in 1938. By the late 1950s there were 135 beds, a school for nurses, and several doctors. Ceza is also the home of Ceza Mission Station.

== History ==
The Ceza caves, on Ceza Mountain, were the scene of the final act in Dinuzulu’s resistance against the British annexation of Zululand. After the Anglo-Zulu War of 1879, Zululand had been partitioned into 13 sections which were parceled out to individual chiefs. To stem the chaos which erupted, Hlatshwayo was restored as Paramount Chief, but civil war broke out in Zululand and his son Siwelile the first, succeeded him after his death 1884. The young king was placed in the care of the Usuthu faction who established a refuge for him in caves located in the Ceza Forest. Dinuzulu eventually defeated his rival Zibhebhu with Boer aid and was installed as king The Boers then claimed the land they had been promised for their services and, Dinuzulu believing they wanted too much, appealed to the British for help. Instead, the British annexed the whole of Zululand and Dinuzulu retaliated in 1887 by mounting attacks against Zulus loyal to Britain and trying to drive white traders and missionaries out of Zululand.

The authorities in Natal appealed to the Cape for help and, in 1888, 2000 British troops were sent to Eshowe to mount operations against Dinuzulu, who was besieging a fort at the mouth of the iMfolozi River. Six hundred men under the command of Major McKean, of the 6th Royal Dragoons, and a young officer called Robert Baden-Powell, marched to relieve the fort, which occurred with little trouble. Baden-Powell was detailed to track down Dinuzulu and eventually found him and his followers sheltering in caves on Ceza mountain. The Zulus managed to escape during the night before the attack and fled into the Transvaal Republic. Dinuzulu realised that he could not win against the British and surrendered to them some time later.

== Hospitals ==
Ceza hospital is a Level 1, District Hospital. It is in a local hospital - central Ceza, has a nursing school training enrolled categories and a bridging course. Ceza Hospital has 160 usable beds plus 12 lodger mother beds. There are nine fixed clinics and one mobile clinic with 30 visiting points. There is no clinic offering a 24-hour service but Ceza hospital provides this service. The hospital serves a population of about 40,353. The Ceza area is deeply rural with very poor gravel roads. It is also marked by high unemployment and poverty rates.

Thulasizwe hospital was officially opened on 27 November 1965 as the Ceza Hospital TB wing under Swedish missionaries.
