= Reproductions Museum Bilbao =

Coordinates: 43.2555°N 2.9264°W

Museo Reproducciones Bilbao
- Museo Reproducciones Bilbao
- Established: 1927
- Location: Bilbao, Basque Country, Spain
- Type: Art museum
- Website: http://www.museoreproduccionesbilbao.org

The Reproductions Museum Bilbao, was created in 1927, the purpose of the museum is to compile classic pieces of art for the enjoyment of the local people. Among the works reproduced faithfully from museums like the Louvre, Vatican or British Museum: the Panathenaic Frieze of the Parthenon, the Slaves and the Moses of Michelangelo, the Venus de Milo, the Winged Victory, the Laocoön Group, the Apoxyomenos, Gabies's Diana and Apollo Belvedere, among others.

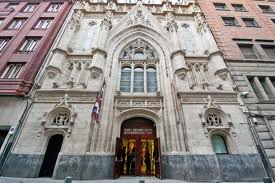
Façade

== History ==
=== Backgrounds ===
Since the sixteenth century there has been a large tradition of copying works of classical art using the traditional technique of plaster cast. France and Italy will be in those early days the main countries where the art reproduction will be used. From the nineteenth century several museums gradually opened, generally tied to universities and academies of fine arts with the goal of teaching art history in a practical and dynamic way. One of the first fine arts museum was opened in Britain in 1857. The aim of the governments of that time, was to show to the common people the "culture of humanity." The reproduction of works of art, has been useful to teach art, but apart from that it gives the chance to have testimonies of many [works that during the Second World War were destroyed. However, during the twentieth century, museums of reproductions suffered a great decline, surpassed only now, with the modernization of some of them like the Berlin museum, the Trocadero, the Victoria & Albert Museum, etc.

=== Foundation and beginning ===
The Reproductions Museum Bilbao was founded in 1927, after an intense campaign done by various institutions at a time when in the rest of Europe, the reproduction of artistic works was in decline. The museum focused its activity on artistic and cultural offerings of the town and on improving student learning of the Section of Fine Arts, School of Arts and Crafts. Manuel Ramírez Escudero was one of the main promoters of the museum. Since 1928, he has chaired the Board of Trustees of the same, a position that he held until 1967. Following the proposal by Ramírez Escudero in 1922 to the Board of Basque Culture, on October 1, 1927, approved the creation of the museum, once the council and the city of Bilbao gave their approval to the project. It is therefore one of the oldest museums in Bilbao. The Board of Trustees was constructed by distinguished figures from the artistic world, professionals such as: Ángel Larroque, Ricardo Bastida, and Higinio Basterra. The museum has been located in different venues throughout its history. First, and as of 1957, it was located in the basement of Berastegi School. It later moved to a local rehabilitated Conde Mirasol Street (where it is currently the administrative headquarters and didactic). Since the enlargement of the Church of the Sacred Heart of Jesus in the neighborhood of San Francisco in 2006, the museum houses the temple main exposure.

== Reproductions ==
From the beginning, the museum officials prevailed above all the quality of the work that they loved playing, rather than quantity. Thus, efforts were made to acquire works directly from the British Museum. Shipments of parts to play had the invaluable help of the illustrious businessman from Biscay called Ramón de la Sota. At the same time, taking into account the proximity of the Museum of Fine Arts in Bilbao, it was asked to give some works. The earliest works come from the workshop to the Museum of Benito Madrid Bertolozzi: Leda, the David of Verrochio, "The Boy of the Thorn", "The Belvedere Torso", "Slave", "Torso of Subiaco", "Torso" by Phidias, "Apollonius". Later, also in Madrid, reach other famous works as "Discobole" or "Venus of Horses". On the other hand, unsuccessfully raised basement house the works of the Madrid Museum of Reproductions. From foreign museums reach of museums like Munich, works like Hercules or Hurt Warrior. Berlín: "Hermes" of Praxiteles. London will be acquired "Injured Lioness or "Three Fates". Louvre "Charioteer of Delphi", Venus de Milo or Winged Victory. From the Vatican Museum arrived Apollo, Laocoon and a portrait of Demosthenes.

== Collection ==
The museum collection consists of replicas of classical art. His works stand out for their accuracy as they are direct copies of the originals.

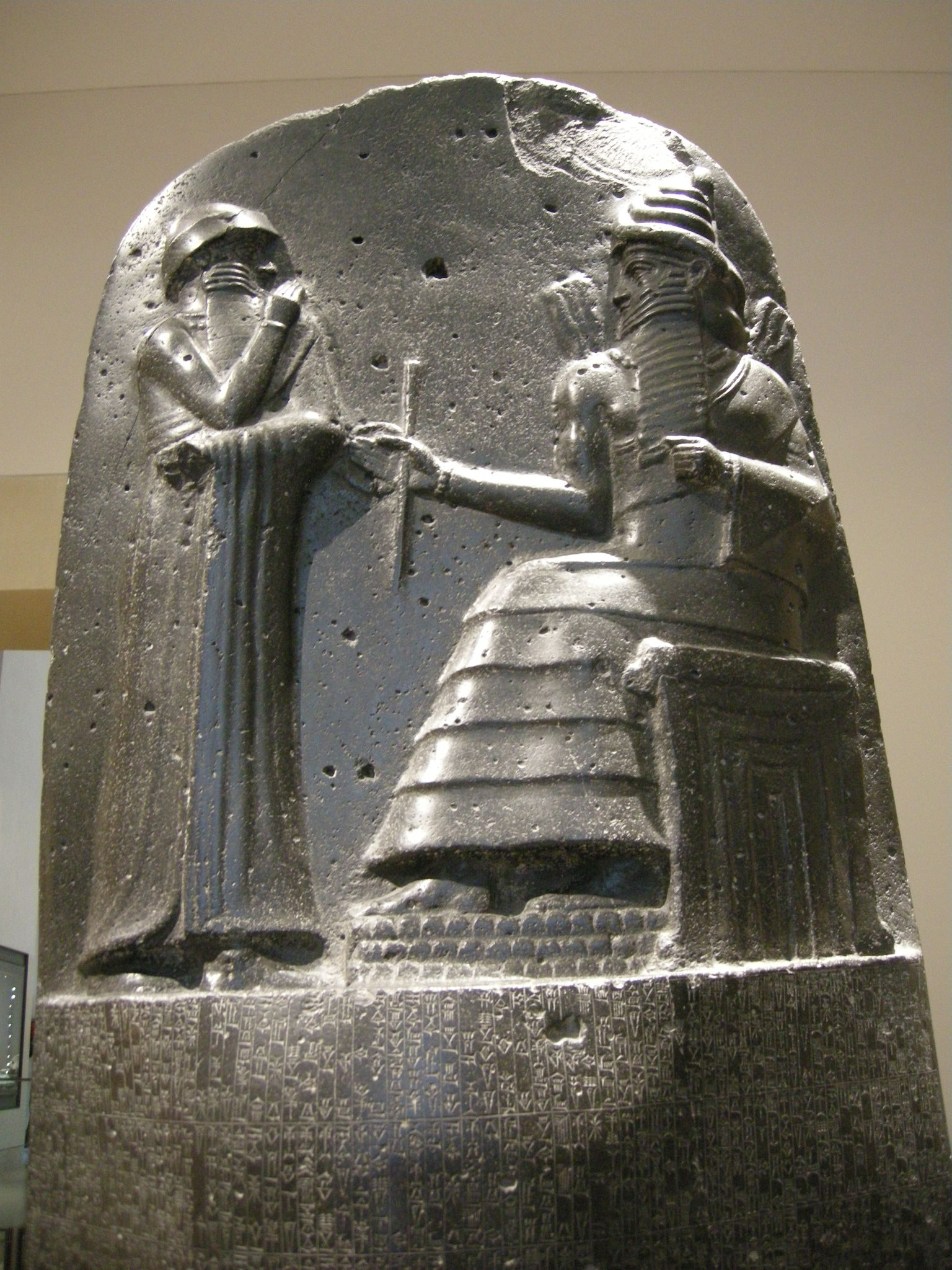
Codice di hammurabi 03

=== Exhibited works ===
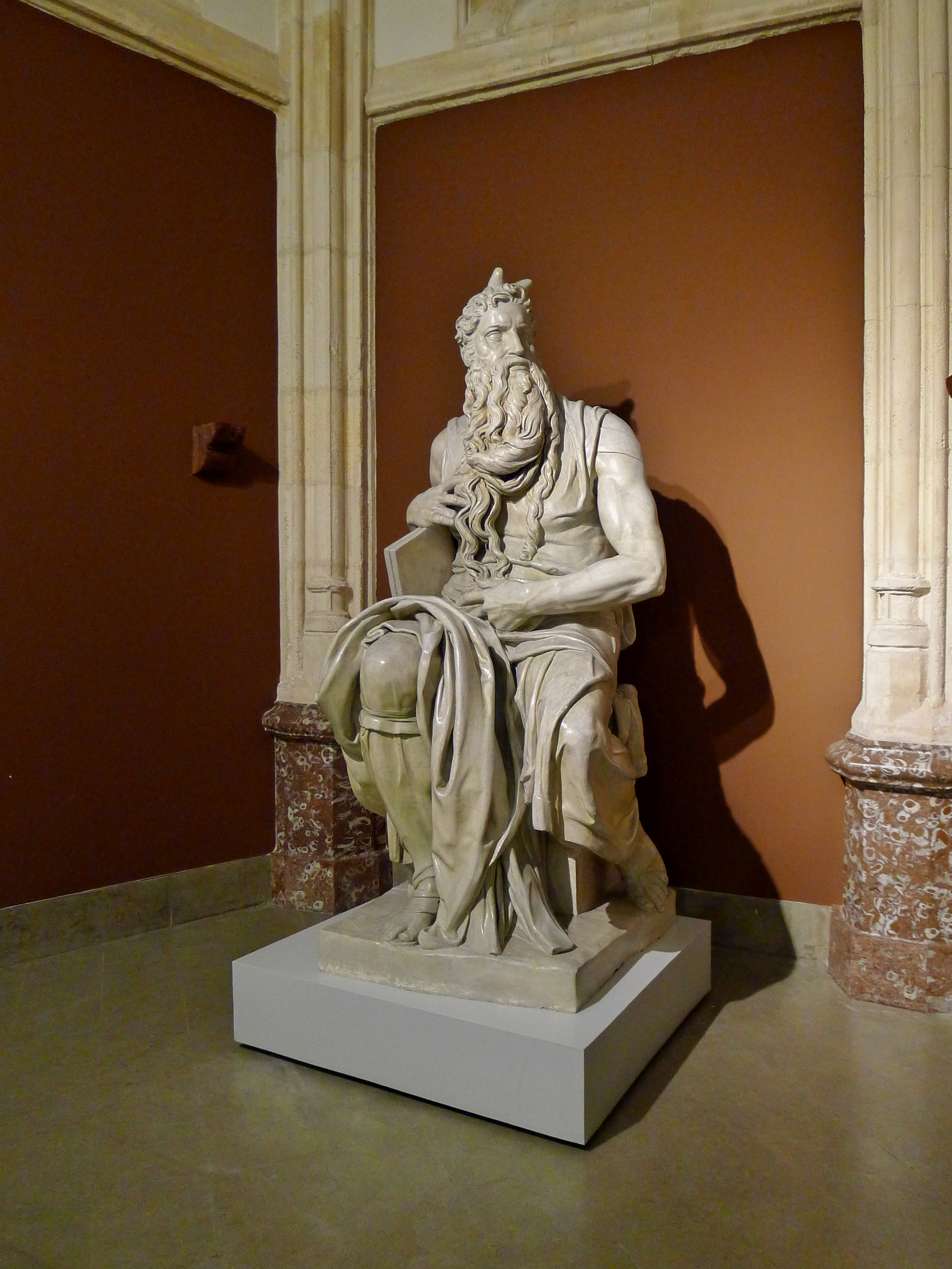
Replica of the Moses (originally sculpted by Michelangelo Buonarroti).

- Lorenzo de' Medici
- Laocoön and His Sons
- Charioteer of Delphi
- Hermes and the Infant Dionysos
- Aphrodite and Dione from the East Pediment of the Parthenon
- The Winged Victory of Samothrace
- Esquiline Venus
- The Fighters
- Zeus and Athena from the Pergamon Altar.
- Silenus and Dionysus
- Moses
- Apollo Belvedere
- Diana of Versailles
- Boy with thorn
- Belvedere Torso
- Borghese Gladiator
- Diana of Gabii
- Venus of Cnidus
- Discobolus

== Exposures ==
=== Permanent exposure ===
See: Collection

=== Temporary exposure ===
The temporary exhibition has varied over the history of the museum. Other stand out the days of "the work in context" which have seen contextualization of such famous works as Cnidian Aphrodite of Praxiteles, the Apoxyomenos of Lysippus, Gabies's Diana, The Acropolis, the box and the frieze of Phidias Parthenon, The Judgement of Paris by Rubens. Other temporary exhibitions that focused on "the art to play" or "Naked beauty. Greek symmetry." In addition, there have been exhibitions of classical art farther as those relating to historic bridges of Bilbao, or the San Antón Bridge.

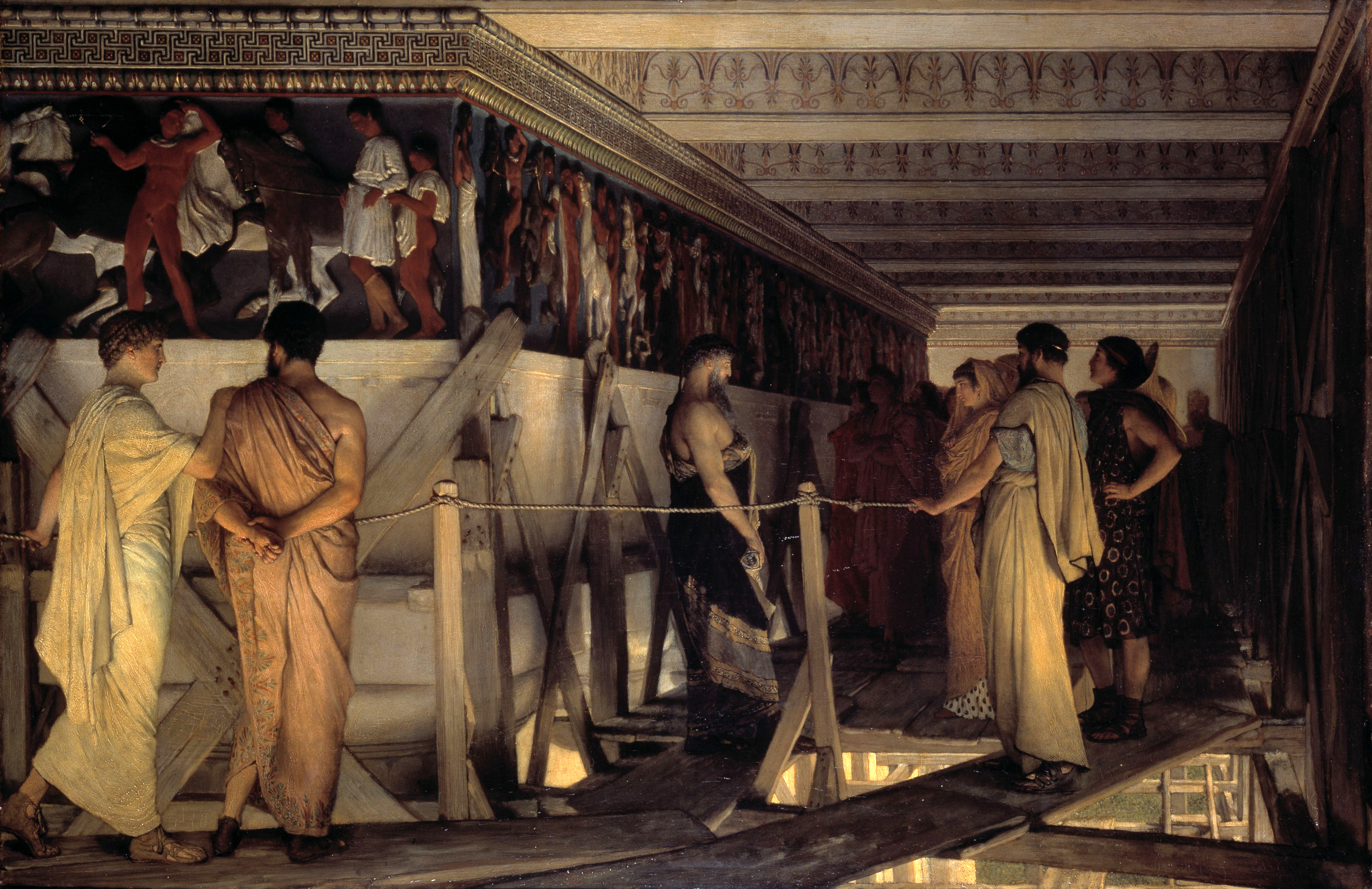
Phidias showing the Frieze of the Parthenon to his Friends, Lawrence Alma-Tadema, 1868.

== Headquarters ==
- Former Headquarters Berástegui schools

Were totally inadequate when the whole house sculptures.

- Headquarter at the Heart of Mary Church

In 2006 the church underwent a thorough restoration to accommodate the expansion of the Museum of Artistic Reproductions of Bilbao. It intervened level facades, indoor and indoor units. also developed within the Church a four-level structure. Among the objectives of the museum responsible for the new seat, not the preservation of books, but rather the continuation of its work teaching about art history.

- Administration and Teaching headquarter

Located at Conde Mirasol 2 of Bilbao.

== Events ==
The museum often organizes educational activities, designed to teach the most representative works, students of Fine Arts as well as the most profane. Among the purely artistic events include guided tours, exhibitions of the work in context, artistic practices with children and families. They give classes in drawing and painting, also offered programs to bring art to schools or conferences and talks are held. In addition, the museum will also organize other events such as concerts, fashion shows...always aimed to streamline the often conflicting Bilbao neighborhood of San Francisco.
