= Rorke's Drift Art and Craft Centre =

South African arts and crafts center

Rorke's Drift Art and Craft Centre is a center for arts and crafts, including fine art, printmaking, pottery and weaving, in KwaZulu-Natal, South Africa. It has been described as "the most famous indigenous art centre in South Africa".

== History ==
Founded by the Church of Sweden Mission, Rorke's Drift Art and Craft Centre started producing weaving in 1965. It was originally intended to teach crafts such as weaving to female nurses who would then pass it down to their patients as a form of occupational therapy. The workshop's first Swedish directors were Ulla Gowenius (an artist and weaver) and her husband, Peder Gowenius (an art teacher), both graduates of Konstfackskolan in Stockholm. The first student to enroll in their classes was Allina Ndebele, who then went on to form her own weaving workshop and is now an internationally recognized artist. During the 1960s the three main production studios were established at Rorke's Drift (as it is known worldwide), and its staff continue to design and create tapestries and woven rugs, printed fabrics and stoneware ceramics to the present.

The Pottery Workshop started in 1968 with Danish supervisors (first Peter Tybjerg, then later Ole and Anne Nielsen) with founding throwers Gordon Mbatha, Ephraim Ziqubu, Bhekisani Manyoni and Joel Sibisi. Already expert ceramists from the neighbouring Shiyane-Nqutu region, Dinah Molefe and several women of her family joined the Pottery Workshop from the start as skilled hand-builders, accustomed to using traditional Zulu and Sotho coiling methods in the making of domestic izinkamba (beer pots). The gendered work-division in the studio's ceramics —women coiling, men throwing— has been maintained to the present.

Through his consultations as intergroup mediator in the late 1960s, H.W. van der Merwe was alerted to the presence of Rorke's Drift Art and Craft Centre in KwaZulu-Natal, South Africa and a need for assistance in its newly established Pottery Workshop. His wife Marietjie was an MFA (Ceramics) graduate of UCLA and a practicing South African ceramist who was able to offer her support to the studio at Rorke's Drift. Marietjie was appointed Advisor to the Pottery Workshop in 1971, and having designed and built a large oil-firing kiln in 1973, she continued to mentor the studio's ceramists and to help with technical problems until her death in 1992.

In the era when apartheid policies denied a formal education to black artists and crafters, under the Directorship of Jules and Ada van de Vijver, Rorkes Drift also established a Fine Art School. The van de Vijvers introduced printmaking, photography and weaving to the centre that produced some of southern Africa's most renowned artists and printmakers, including Azaria Mbatha, John Muafangejo, Dan Rakgoathe, and Bongiwe Dhlomo.

The authoritative publication about Rorke's Drift printmakers, most of whom were trained at its Fine Art School, was written by Philippa Hobbs and Elizabeth Rankin in 2003.

A comprehensive article on the Rorke's Drift Art and Craft Centre is available on South African History Online (SAHO).

== Location ==
Rorke's Drift is also the location of the battlefield of the Battle of Rorke's Drift (1879), a historic site in the Anglo-Zulu War where British troops defeated a large Zulu army. The nearby battlefield is a major draw for tourists.
