= Woodford (surname) =

Woodford is a surname originally referring to places located near a river crossing in a forest. The surname Woodforde is pronounced similarly. Notable people with these surnames include:

== Woodford ==
- Adolphus Frederick Alexander Woodford (1821–1887), British historian of Freemasonry
- Arthur B. Woodford (1861–1946), American economist, university professor, grammar school rector, and football coach
- Field Marshal Sir Alexander George Woodford (1782–1870), senior British Army officer and colonial administrator
- Charles Woodford (disambiguation), several people
- Chauncey Woodford (1783–1841), American merchant
- George Woodford (1915–1966), English footballer with Norwich City and Southampton
- Howard E. Woodford (1921–1945), United States Army soldier, Medal of Honor recipient
- Jake Woodford (born 1996), American baseball player
- James Woodford (bishop) (1820–1885), Bishop of Ely from 1873
- James Woodford (1893–1976), English sculptor
- Jeanne Woodford, American former prison officer, executive director of Death Penalty Focus
- John Woodford several people
- Kevin Woodford (born 1950), British TV chef and actor
- Larry Woodford, member of the Ohio House of Representatives (2010)
- Les Woodford (1897–1965), Australian rules footballer
- Matthew Woodford (1738–1807), Archdeacon of Winchester 1795–1807
- Neil Woodford (born 1960), British fund manager
- Nina Woodford, Swedish songwriter
- Sir Ralph Woodford (1784–1828), Governor of Trinidad 1813–1828
- Oswald Langdon Woodford (1827–1870), American Congregationalist minister, teacher, and politician
- Rick Woodford (1948–2006), member of the Newfoundland and Labrador House of Assembly (1985–2003), mayor of Cormack
- Robert Woodford (diarist) (1606–1654), English lawyer
- Robert J. Woodford (1936–2019), American expert on the Latter Day Saint movement
- Stewart L. Woodford (1835–1913), American politician
- William Woodford (politician) (1858–1944), Canadian politician from Newfoundland
- William Woodford (1734–1780), American general
- Edith Woodford-Grimes (also known as Dafo; 1887–1975), one of the earliest known English Wiccan
- Sue Woodford-Hollick (born 1945), British businesswoman and campaigner
- Eluned Woodford-Williams (1913–1984), British geriatrician
- Helen Woodford Ruth (1897–1929), American socialite, first wife of Babe Ruth

== Woodforde ==
- Anna Maria Woodforde (1757–1830), English housekeeper and diarist
- Christopher Woodforde (1907–1962), Anglican priest, Dean of Wells 1959–1962
- James Woodforde (1740–1803), English author of The Diary of a Country Parson, published posthumously
- Dr John Woodforde (1808–1866), early British settler of Adelaide, South Australia
- Mark Woodforde (born 1965), Australian professional tennis player
- Samuel Woodforde (1763–1817), English painter
- Amy Woodforde-Finden (1860–1919), Chilean composer

== See also ==
- The Woodford baronets
- Woodford (disambiguation)
