= Castle Cary Market House =

Municipal building in Castle Cary, Somerset, England

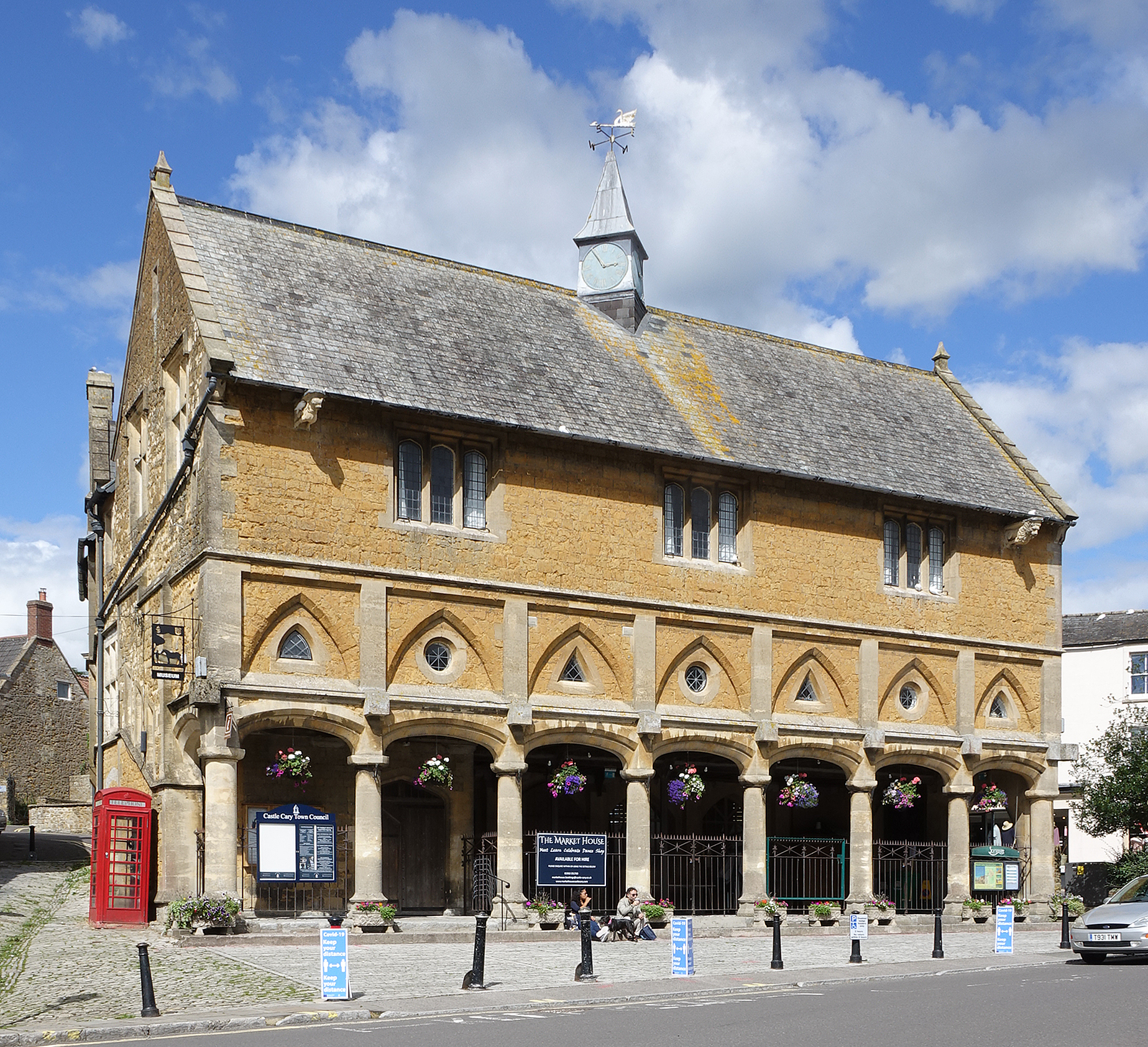
- The building in August 2020

- Shown in Somerset
- 51.0896°N 2.5140°W
- Location: Market Place, Castle Cary

History
- Built: 1855

Site notes
- Architect: Francis Penrose
- Architectural style: Neoclassical style

Listed Building – Grade II*
- Official name: The Market House
- Designated: 4 February 1974
- Reference no.: 1056254

Castle Cary Market House, also known as Castle Cary Town Hall, is a municipal building in the Market Place in Castle Cary, Somerset, England. The structure, which accommodates the offices of Castle Cary Town council as well as the Castle Cary and District Museum, is a Grade II* listed building.

== History ==
The town received a royal charter, allowing it to hold markets, from Edward IV in 1468. The market took the form of a series of stalls in the Market Place for over a century until the first market house was completed in 1616. After the old building became dilapidated, and in anticipation of increased trade associated with a new railway station, a group of local businessmen decided to form a company, to be known as the "Castle Cary Market House Company" to finance and commission a new market house.

The building was designed by Francis Penrose in the neoclassical style, built in yellow sandstone at a cost of £3,000 and was completed in 1855. The design involved a symmetrical main frontage of seven bays facing southeast onto the Market Place. On the ground floor there was a colonnade, formed by columns surmounted by imposts and segmental arches. Over the colonnade, at mezzanine level was a series of pointed recesses with alternating triangular and rounded windows, separated by short pilasters. Above this, the first floor was fenestrated by three tri-partite mullioned windows. The building also featured a slate roof and a central roof lantern. The arcaded ground floor was used for corn markets (and on certain days cheese markets). The mezzanine floor above served as a granary and cheese store for the market; (because the building backed on to a hill, delivery carts had street-level access to the mezzanine from the rear, by way of a ramp). The upper floor contained a large assembly room, with a gallery for an orchestra at the western end. On the west side, a wing extended behind the main structure containing reading rooms (and accommodation for a porter) on the upper floors, and space for a poultry and vegetable market on the lower level. A triangular courtyard filled the rest of the space between the two wings of the complex, in which butchers' stalls were laid out along the northern boundary wall. By 1859 a clock had been installed within the turret on top of the roof.

The use of the ground floor as a corn exchange declined significantly in the wake of the Great depression of British agriculture in the late 19th century. The floor was used instead as a furniture store from the 1880s, and as a store for agricultural implements and tombstones by the turn of the century.

When parish and district councils were established under the Local Government Act 1894, the building became the meeting place for Castle Cary Parish Council. At this time the building became known as the "Town Hall".

The Castle Cary and District Museum was established at the back of a baker's shop in 1974, and then moved into the first floor of the market house a few years later. A room in the museum was subsequently dedicated to the life and work of Parson James Woodforde who was born at the Parsonage in nearby Ansford in 1740. He was later curate at Thurloxton before moving to Norfolk. For nearly 45 years he kept a diary recording an existence the very ordinariness of which provides a unique insight into the everyday routines and concerns of 18th century rural England.

Unable to meet its commitment to keep the building in good state of repair, the Castle Cary Market House Company sold the building to South Somerset District Council in 1991.

== See also ==
- Grade II* listed buildings in South Somerset
