= Church of All Saints, Castle Cary =

Church in Somerset, England

Church of All Saints
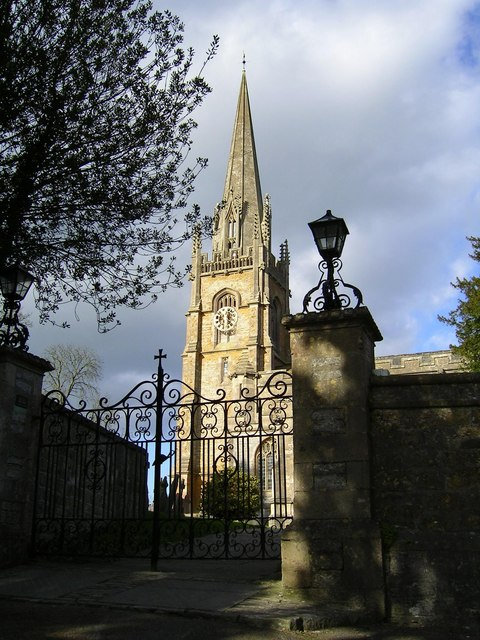

- Location within Somerset
- 51°05′12″N 2°31′00″W
- Location: Castle Cary, Somerset
- Country: England
- Denomination: Church of England

Architecture
- Heritage designation: Grade II* listed
- Designated: 24 March 1961
- Completed: c. 1470

Administration
- Diocese: Bath and Wells
- Archdeaconry: Wells
- Deanery: Bruton and Cary
- Parish: Castle Cary and Ansford

All Saints Church in Castle Cary in the English county of Somerset dates from 1470 and is notable for its high steeple. It is a Grade II* listed building.

The parish is within the benefice of Castle Cary with Ansford which is part of the archdeaconry of Wells.

== History ==
The church has Saxon origins, however none of the fabric from the wooden building survive. The current Perpendicular Gothic building was constructed around 1470.

During the English Civil War the church was damaged and the organ destroyed.

The life of the local church was described by James Woodforde in his The Diary of a Country Parson. He was born in Ansford where his father was the vicar. A display about his life and writings is available in the Castle Cary and District Museum.

It was restored by Benjamin Ferrey in the 1850s. This work increased the number of "free" or unreserved seats, by increasing the length of the nave. He also raised the height of the tower.

== Architecture ==
The building is made of local stone with dressings from Doulting Stone Quarry. It has a slate roof with battlemented parapets.

The three-stage tower contains six bells dating from 1760 and made by Thomas Bilbie of the Bilbie family.

== Interior ==
The church contains a font and wooden pulpit which both date from the 15th century.

== Churchyard ==
The Cosenes monument in the churchyard, which dates from the 16th century, is on the Heritage at Risk Register.

== See also ==
- List of ecclesiastical parishes in the Diocese of Bath and Wells
