= Church of St Andrew, Ansford =

Church in Somerset, England

Church of St Andrew
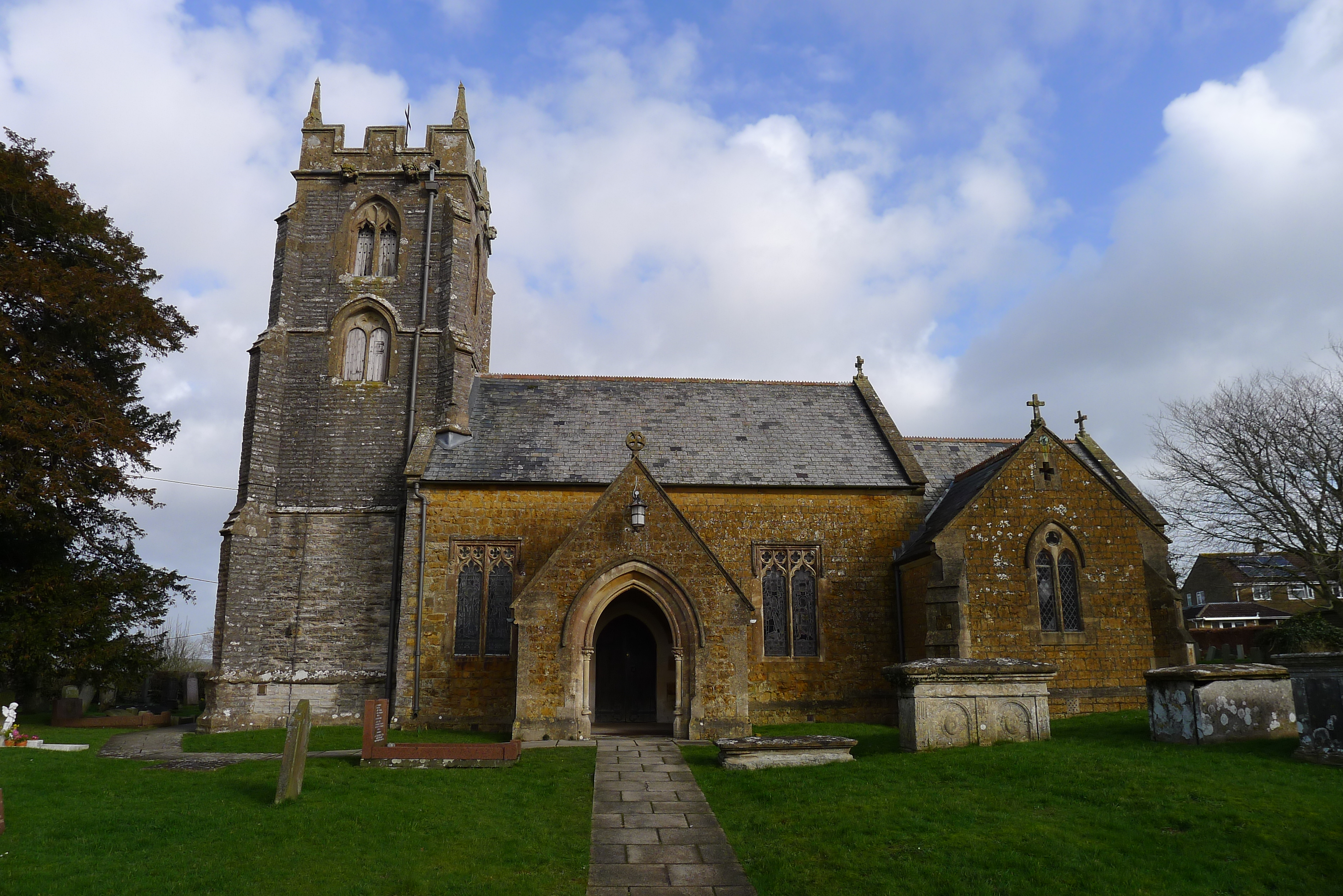

- Location within Somerset
- 51.0943°N 2.5180°W
- Location: Ansford, Somerset, England

History
- Built: 15th century

Listed Building – Grade II*
- Official name: Church of St. Andrew
- Designated: 24 March 1961
- Reference no.: 1307553

The Church of St Andrew in Ansford, Somerset, England, was built in the 15th century. It is a Grade II* listed building.

== History ==
The tower remains from the 15th-century building; however, the rest of the church was rebuilt in 1861 by Charles Edmund Giles.

In the 18th century the living was held by the family of James Woodforde the author of The Diary of a Country Parson.

The parish was combined with All Saints in Castle Cary in 2017 to form a single benefice.

== Architecture ==
The stone building has Doulting stone dressings and slate roofs. It consists of a two-bay chancel, three-bay nave and a north aisle. There is a vestry to the north-east and organ chamber to the south-east. The three-stage west tower is supported by corner buttresses. The tower holds six bells, having been increased from four in the 1990s.

The interior has 19th-century fittings except the 17th-century pulpit, a chest from the 16th century and a 12th- or 13th-century font. The font is made of yellow/grey stone has a circumference of 1.94 metres (6 ft 4 in).

== See also ==
- List of ecclesiastical parishes in the Diocese of Bath and Wells
