= General Woodford =

General Woodford may refer to:

- Alexander George Woodford (1782–1870), British Army general
- John George Woodford (1785–1879), British Army major general
- William Woodford (1734–1780), Continental Army brigadier general
