= Governor Woodford =

Governor Woodford may refer to:

- Alexander George Woodford (1782–1870), Governor of Gibraltar from 1836 to 1842
- Ralph Woodford (1784–1828), Governor of Trinidad from 1813 to 1828
