= Woodford =

Woodford may refer to:

== Places ==
=== Australia ===
- Woodford, New South Wales
- Woodford, Queensland, a town in the Moreton Bay Region
- Woodford, Victoria

=== Canada ===
- Woodford, Ontario

=== England ===
- Woodford, Cornwall
- Woodford, Gloucestershire
- Woodford, Greater Manchester
- Woodford, London, a suburb of London
  - Woodford (constituency), a former constituency
  - Woodford (ward), a former Redbridge London Borough Council electoral ward
- Woodford, Northamptonshire
- Woodford, Somerset
- Woodford, Wiltshire

=== Ireland ===
- Woodford, County Galway
- Woodford River, a tributary of the River Shannon

=== United States ===
- Woodford, California, Kern County
- Woodford, former name of Woodfords, California, Alpine County
- Woodford, Oklahoma
- Woodford, South Carolina
- Woodford, Wisconsin
- Woodford, Vermont
- Woodford, Virginia
- Woodford (Simons Corner, Virginia), listed on the NRHP in Virginia
- Woodford (mansion), Philadelphia

== People ==
- Woodford (surname)

== Football clubs ==
- Woodford Town F.C. (1937)
- Woodford Town F.C. (2007)
- Woodford United F.C.

== Transport ==
- Woodford tube station
- Woodford (ship)

== See also ==
- Woodford County (disambiguation)
- Woodforde
- Woodford Folk Festival, Queensland, Australia
- Woodford Island, Australia
- Woodford Reserve, a brand of bourbon whiskey
- Woodford Stakes, horse race, Kentucky
