= Church of St Giles, Thurloxton =

Church in Somerset, England

Church of St Giles
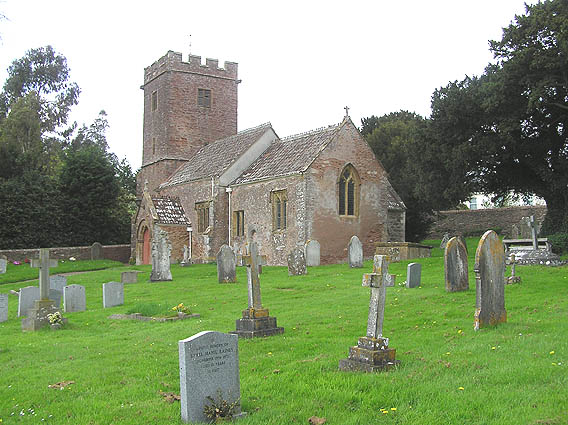

- Location within Somerset
- 51.0685°N 3.0367°W
- Location: Thurloxton, Somerset, England

Listed Building – Grade II*
- Official name: Church of St Giles
- Designated: 29 March 1963
- Reference no.: 1295089

The Norman Anglican Church of St Giles in Thurloxton dates from the 14th century but is predominantly from the 15th century with 19th-century restoration including the addition of the north aisle in 1868. It has been designated by English Heritage as a Grade II* listed building.

== History ==
From October 1763 to January 1764 the vicar was the diarist James Woodforde. He was followed by the Rev William Boone. who was curate of the parish for 43 years, but was outlasted by his rector, the Rev Charles Russell, who was appointed in 1768 and held the living for 65 years.

The parish is part of the Alfred Jewel benefice within the Diocese of Bath and Wells.

== Architecture ==
The church consists of a two-bay nave which has a south porch and three-bay north aisle, and a two-bay chancel with vestry. The two-stage west tower is supported by diagonal buttresses. The interior includes an octagonal Norman font and 18th century rood screen.

== See also ==
- List of ecclesiastical parishes in the Diocese of Bath and Wells
