= John Woodford =

John or Jack Woodford may refer to:

- John Woodford (Australian cricketer) (1881–1949), Australian cricketer
- John Woodford (English cricketer) (born 1943), English cricketer
- John George Woodford (1785–1879), British Army officer
- Jack Woodford (1894–1971), American writer
- John Woodford (MP) (1586-1625), MP for Tamworth and Bury St. Edmund's

== See also ==
- John Woodforde (c. 1808–1866), a medical professional and one of the earliest settlers to the British colony of South Australia
