= Hermione Hobhouse =

British architectural historian (1934–2014)

- Born: Mary Hermione Hobhouse; 2 February 1934; Castle Cary, United Kingdom
- Died: 17 October 2014 (aged 80)
- Known for: Architectural history; architectural preservation
- Spouse: Harry Graham
- Children: 2

Academic background
- Education: Lady Margaret Hall, Oxford University

Academic work
- Discipline: Architectural history
- Institutions: Victorian Society; Survey of London

Mary Hermione Hobhouse MBE FSA (2 February 1934 – 17 October 2014) was a British architectural historian and prominent preservation campaigner.

== Family and early life ==
Hobhouse was born on 2 February 1934 to Sir Arthur Hobhouse and Konradin Huth Jackson at Hadspen House, Castle Cary in Somerset. She was educated at Cheltenham Ladies' College and at Lady Margaret Hall, Oxford, where she read Modern History. Her sister believed Hermione's exposure to Victorian Gothic architecture in this period ignited her interest. On 2 July 1955, Lady Hobhouse held a small "coming-of-age" dance for Hermione and her sister Virginia at Hadspen.

== Career ==
After a short spell in the United States, Hobhouse took a job as a researcher with Granada Television. After this she began working as a freelance writer. Her first book, published in 1959, was a history of the Ward of Cheap in the City of London.

She was the author of Lost London (1971), in whose introduction she wrote:

London is threatened with the grim prospect of a Manhattan-like future, becoming a city of the very rich and the very poor, a city unattainable and increasingly unattractive to the middle classes and to the younger families with children to bring up…

— Hermione Hobhouse, Lost London

Between 1973 and 1978 she gave lectures in architectural history at the Architectural Association as well as in the United States into the 1980s. In 1976 Hobhouse succeeded Jane Fawcett as secretary of the Victorian Society, a group that campaigns to conserve Victorian and Edwardian buildings. A later chair, Peter Howell, said of her in this period:

Her academic credentials, and her networking skills (she was never one to miss a party), helped raise the Society's profile.

— Peter Howell

Her assistant at the Victorian Society, Louise Nicholson, recalled:

On Mondays, she would often arrive at the Vic Soc's offices [in Bedford Park] direct from Somerset, wearing Wellington boots and carrying wicker baskets of home-grown fruit and vegetables. When we joint-hosted Vic Soc dinners, her unlikely skill was to skin, carve and bone out a large chicken, then put the flesh together inside its skin, a party piece to make any Edwardian celebrity chef proud.

— Louise Nicholson

It was a post she held until leaving in 1983 to work as general editor of the Survey of London. During her tenure she oversaw publication of survey volumes on part of Kensington and the challenging prospect of covering the Docklands area of East London at a time when it was dramatically changing and developing. She also edited a monograph for the survey on the former GLC County Hall.

== Honours and external interests ==
In 1981 Hobhouse was appointed MBE. She was also made a fellow of the Society of Antiquaries of London, where she served as a council member between 1984 and 1987. She served on the council of the National Trust (1983–2001) and of the Royal Albert Hall (1988–2004). In the late 20th century the Royal Albert Hall underwent a five-year programme of refurbishment, and she was reported as having supervised the reinstatement of stencilling in the public areas. She supported the Clapham Society and the Somerset Buildings Preservation Trust.

When the Reform Club allowed female members for the first time Hobhouse was one of the first to join. She was a keen supporter of the campaign to restore the club's home in Pall Mall, an Italianate palazzo by Charles Barry.

== Death ==
Hobhouse died on 17 October 2014, aged 80.

== Personal life ==
Hobhouse married architect Harry Graham in 1958. The marriage produced two children – a son, Francis, and daughter, Harriet – before being amicably dissolved. Hobhouse was survived by her children.

== Partial bibliography ==
- The Ward of Cheap in the City of London: A Short History (1959)
- Lost London: A Century of Demolition and Decay (1971)
- Thomas Cubitt: Master Builder (1971, revised 1995)
- A History of Regent Street (1975)
- Oxford and Cambridge with Richard Gloucester (1980)
- Prince Albert: His Life and Work (1983)
- Survey of London Volume XLII: Southern Kensington: Kensington Square to Earl's Court (as editor) (1986)
- Good and Proper Materials: Fabric of London Since the Great Fire with Ann Saunders (1989)
- County Hall: Survey Of London Monograph 17 (as editor) (1991)
- Survey of London Volumes XLIII and XLIV: Poplar, Blackwall and the Isle of Dogs (as editor) (1994)
- London Survey'd: The Work Of The Survey Of London 1894–1994 (1994)
- Crystal Palace and the Great Exhibition: Science, Art, and Productive Industry: The History of the Royal Commission of the Exhibition of 1851 (2002)
- History of Regent Street: A Mile of Style (2008)
