= Koos Bekker =

South African businessman (born 1952)

- Born: 14 December 1952 (age 73); Potchefstroom, North West, South Africa
- Education: University of the Witwatersrand; Columbia University
- Occupation: Chair of Naspers
- Spouse: Karen Roos
- Children: 4

Jacobus Petrus "Koos" Bekker (born 14 December 1952) is a South African billionaire businessman, and the chairman of Prosus, and Naspers, a global consumer internet group and one of the largest technology investors and operators in the world. The company operates in 130 countries and is listed on the London Stock Exchange and Johannesburg Stock Exchange. It has the largest market capitalization of any media company outside the United States and China. As of January 2025, his net worth was estimated at US$2.9 billion.

== Early life ==
Koos Bekker was born in Potchefstroom, South Africa in 1952. He attended Hoër Volkskool Heidelberg and completed degrees at Stellenbosch University, in law and literature, and at Wits University, in law. He holds an MBA from Columbia Business School, New York and an honorary doctorate from Stellenbosch University.

== Career ==
After a few years in advertising, he received an MBA degree from Columbia Business School, graduating in 1984. As a result of a project paper, he, with a few young colleagues, founded one of the first two pay-television services outside of the United States. M-Net and its sister companies, such as Multichoice, eventually expanded to 48 countries across Africa. In the 1990s, he was a founding director of mobile communication company MTN. In 1997 Bekker became CEO of Naspers, one of the initial investors in the M-Net/Multichoice group. Naspers bought out the other shareholders. During his tenure, the market capitalization of Naspers grew from about $1.2 billion to $45 billion. His compensation package was unusual in that for fifteen years as CEO he earned no salary, bonus or perks. He was compensated solely via stock option grants that vested over time.

Under Bekker, Naspers invested in pay television, mobile telephony and various internet services, which included buying part of the Chinese Internet firm Tencent as an anchor shareholder from 2001, with a current stake of 23%. Over time, the Naspers Prosus group expanded into various sectors of the consumer internet including classified services, food delivery and payment systems. The group conducts business in Europe, Africa, Latin America, India and South Africa with a group market capitalization of US$124 billion.

In 2020, former South African Minister for Communications, Yunus Carrim testified to the Zondo Commission into State Capture that Bekker had played a significant role in irregularly pressuring government officials to protect MultiChoice's effective monopoly over South Africa's pay-TV sector. The Zondo Commission found no wrongdoing on the part of MultiChoice.

The Constitutional Court has held that Government's digital migration policy is not centered around individual players in the broadcasting industry and that the policy decision to dump decryption capability in government subsidized DTT set top boxes was in the best interests of the poor and the broader public. [Electronic Media Network Limited and Others v e.tv (Pty) Limited and Others 2017 (9) BCLR 1108 (CC).

== Personal life ==
Bekker is married to Karen Roos, has two children and resides in Cape Town, South Africa. The couple have been responsible for developing Hadspen House near Castle Cary in Somerset, England, as The Newt in Somerset, a luxury hotel and visitor attraction in extensive grounds. He has also by 2026 built up landholdings in the area of over 2,700 acres (1,100 ha), around Bruton and Castle Cary, through his company Emily Estate (UK) Limited which trades as The Newt, according to The Guardian. The Newt was the primary sponsor of the Chelsea Flower Show from 2022 to 2025.

Bekker has also owned Babylonstoren, a wine estate in the Drakenstein Valley in the Cape Winelands, South Africa, since 2007. As one of the oldest Cape Dutch houses in South Africa, the estate is a popular tourist attraction and hotel with its garden inspired by the historic Company's Garden in Cape Town.
