= Castle Cary and District Museum =

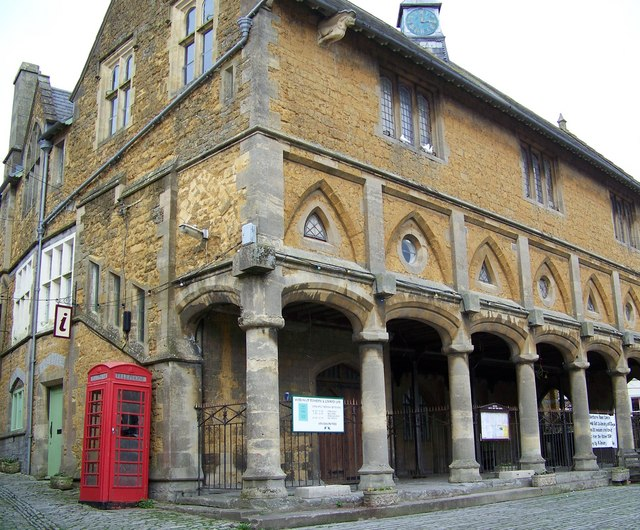
- Market House

- Location within Somerset
- Location: Castle Cary, Somerset, England, United Kingdom
- Coordinates: 51.0896°N 2.5141°W
- Type: Local museum
- Website: Museum website

Castle Cary and District Museum is a small local museum in Castle Cary, Somerset, England.

The museum is housed in the Market House, a grade II* listed building built in 1855 in anticipation of increased trade after the projected arrival of the railway in 1856, by F.C. Penrose. It replaced the former house on the site which had stood since 1616, and incorporating some features from the earlier building. The building also contains two old prison cells, and the Information Centre.

== Collections ==
There is a varied collection of exhibits spread over the two floors of the building. The earliest are local fossils including ammonites and a display about the discovery of an Ichthyosaurus skeleton at Alford. Local industry and agriculture are represented with displays on the production of rope and hemp, particularly John Boyd Textiles and Donne & Sons who were rope makers in the town between 1797 and the 1960s. There is also a collection of agricultural implements, tools and relics, and geology of the local area. Information is also provided about Cary Castle, a motte and bailey castle which was built either by Walter of Douai or by the following owners, the Perceval family, after the Norman conquest. It was besieged by King Stephen in 1138, and again in 1153. By 1468 the castle had been abandoned in favour of a manor house which was built beside it. The site was excavated in 1890 and demonstrated the foundations of a 24 metres (79 ft) square tower.

A room is dedicated to the live and work of Parson James Woodforde who was born at the Parsonage in nearby Ansford in 1740. He was later curate at Thurloxton before moving to Norfolk. For nearly 45 years he kept a diary recording an existence the very ordinariness of which provides a unique insight into the everyday routines and concerns of 18th century rural England.
