= Anna Maria Woodforde =

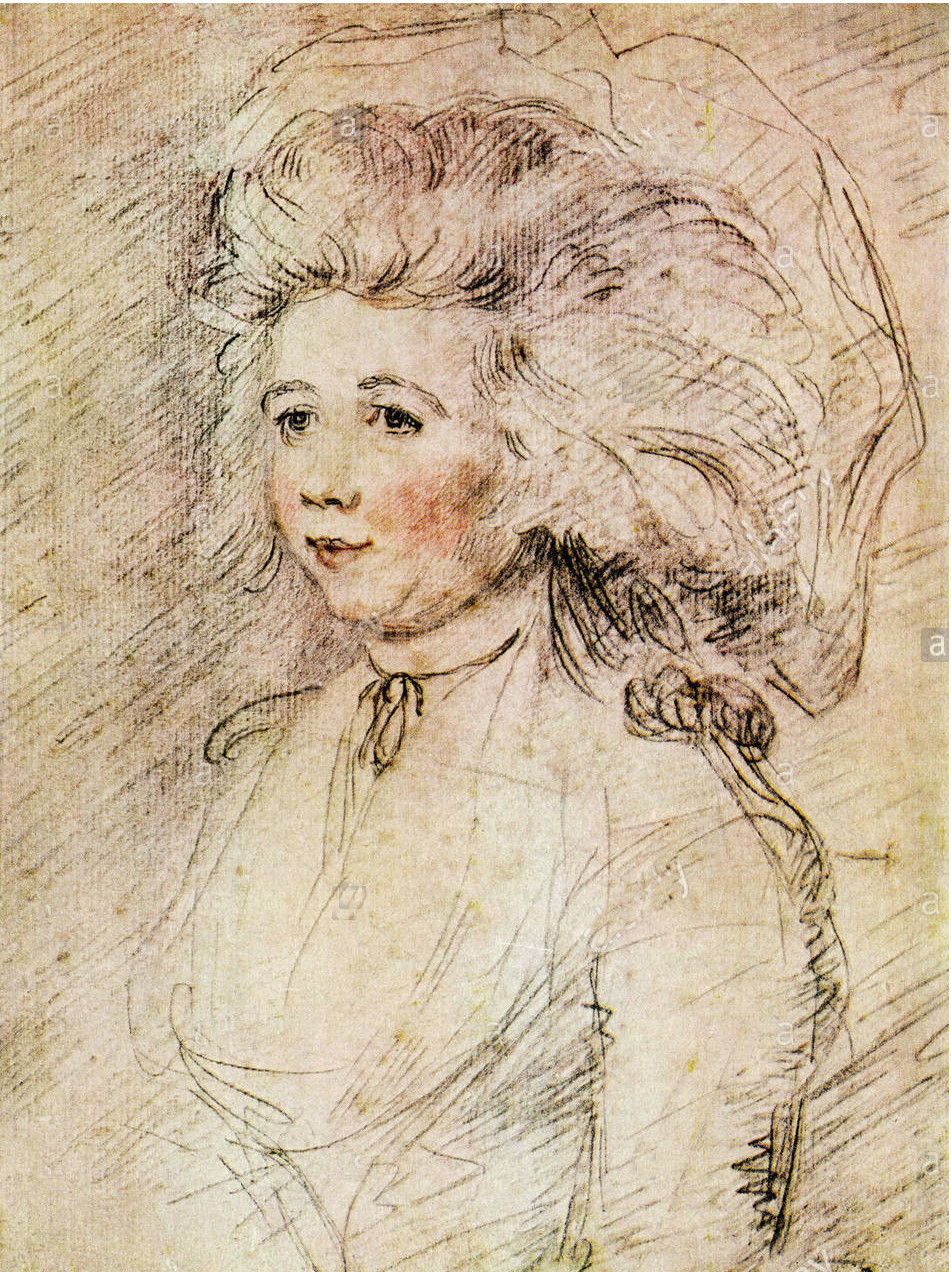
- Nancy after Samuel Woodforde
- Born: 8 March 1757; Alhampton Court, Ditcheat, Somerset
- Died: 13 January 1830 (aged 72); Castle Cary
- Occupation: housekeeper
- Employer: James Woodforde
- Known for: her diary
- Parent(s): Heighes and Anne (born Dorville) Woodforde

Anna Maria Woodforde known as "Nancy"' (8 March 1757 – 13 January 1830) was an English housekeeper and diarist.

== Life ==
Woodforde was born in Alhampton Court in Ditcheat, Somerset, in 1757. In 1780, she was taken in by her uncle as a companion and housekeeper. She was single and grateful for this opportunity to live in Weston Longville. Her uncle, James Woodforde, was a cleric who achieved fame posthumously when his edited diary was published as The Diary of a Country Parson. In the diary, he refers to her as "Nancy" but switches to "Miss Woodforde" as she gets older and their relationship becomes less friendly. She is remembered for her correspondence and for producing a detailed diary for the year of 1792. She looked after her uncle until his death in 1803. She died in 1830.

Woodforde died in Castle Cary in 1830 and her death was reported in the Gentleman's Magazine. Her papers including some verse and her accounts are in the Bodleian Library.
