= Babylonstoren =

Wine farm in South Africa

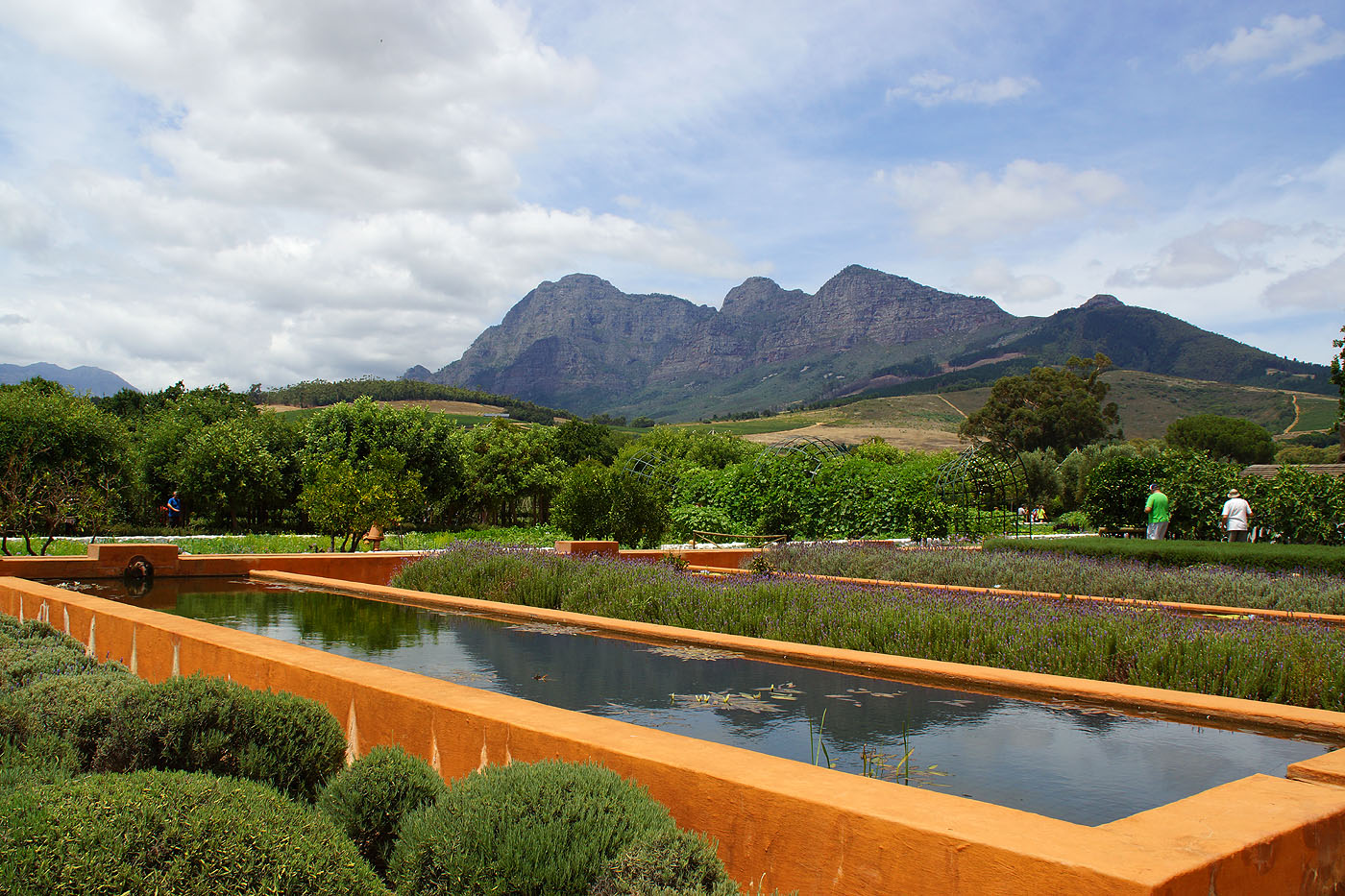

Babylonstoren is a wine estate in the Drakenstein Valley in the Cape Winelands, South Africa. As one of the oldest Cape Dutch houses in South Africa, the estate is a popular tourist attraction, particularly because of its garden, designed by Patrice Taravella, inspired by the historic Company's Garden in Cape Town, and was described as "the Versailles of vegetable gardens" by the Sunday Times. The garden contains over 300 tree varieties and thousands of plant species.

The estate was founded in 1692 and has been owned by billionaire Koos Bekker and his wife Karen Roos since 2007.
