= Francis Sheppard =

British historian and topographical writer

Francis Henry Wollaston Sheppard (10 September 1921 – 22 January 2018) was a historian of London and topographical writer who was responsible for many of the volumes in the Survey of London. He was described by Andrew Saint as "London's greatest topographical writer since John Stow".

== Selected publications ==
- Local Government in Marylebone 1688–1835 (1958)
- London 1808–1870: The Infernal Wen (1971)
- The Treasury of London's Past (1991)
- London: A History (1998)

== See also ==
- Harold James Dyos
