= Survey of London =

Architectural survey of central London and its suburbs

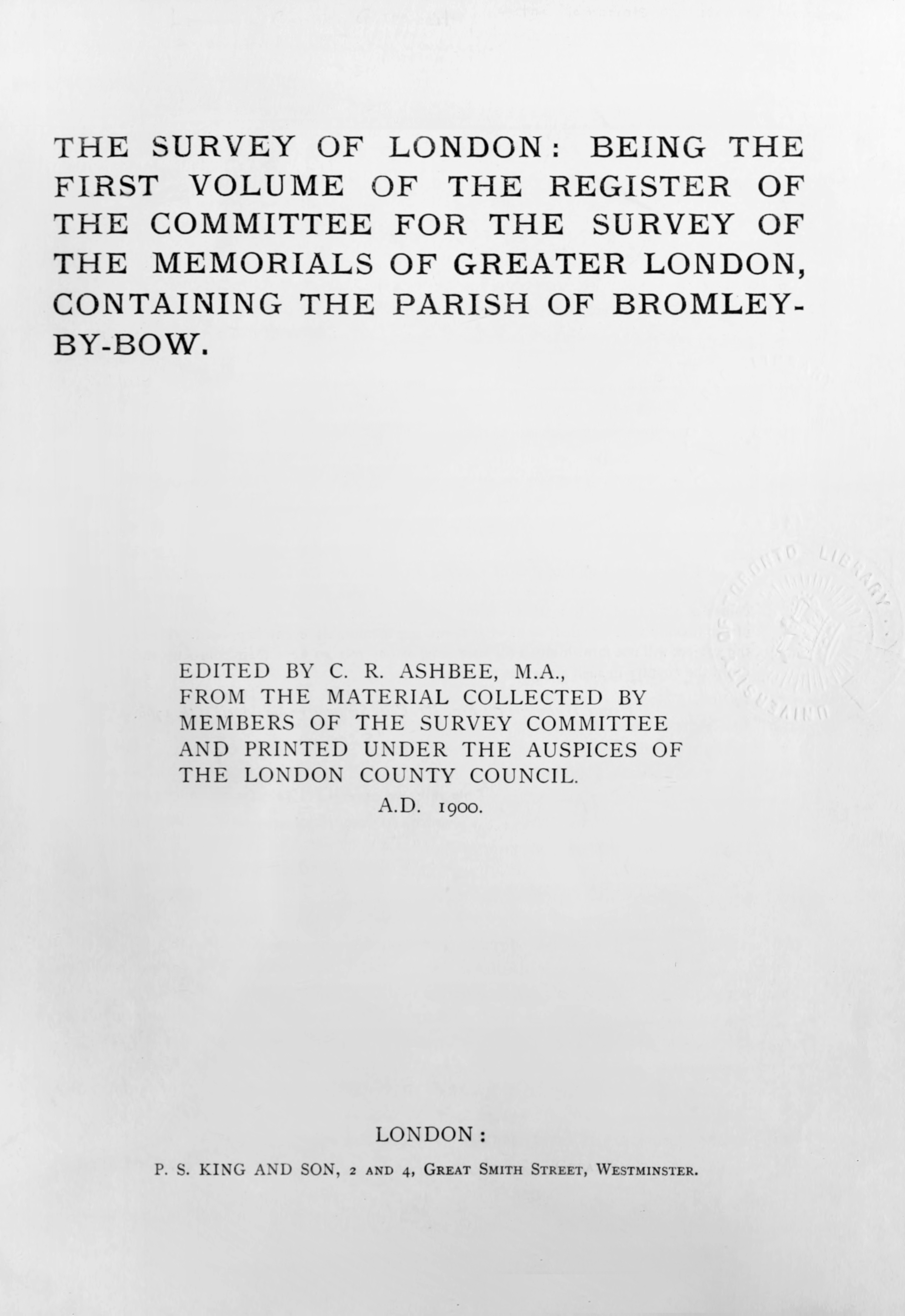
Title page of the first volume, covering Bromley-by-Bow, 1900

The Survey of London is a research project to produce a comprehensive architectural survey of central London and its suburbs, or the area formerly administered by the London County Council. It was founded in 1894 by Charles Robert Ashbee, an Arts-and-Crafts designer, architect and social reformer and was motivated by a desire to record and preserve London's ancient monuments. The first volume was published in 1900, but the completion of the series remains far in the future.

The London Survey Committee was initially a volunteer effort, but from 1910 published the surveys jointly with the London County Council (later the Greater London Council, GLC). From 1952, the voluntary committee was disbanded, and all survey work was wholly council-run. Following the abolition of the GLC in 1986, responsibility for the survey was taken over by the Royal Commission on the Historical Monuments of England (RCHME). Since 2013, it has been administered by The Bartlett School of Architecture, University College London.

The series borrows its title from John Stow's A Survay of London (first edition 1598; revised edition 1603).

== Scope ==
The Survey consists of a series of volumes based mainly on the historical parish system. Each volume gives an account of the area, with sufficient general history to put the architecture in context, and then proceeds to describe the notable streets and individual buildings one by one. The accounts are exhaustive, reviewing all available primary sources in detail. The Survey devotes thousands of words to some buildings that receive the briefest of mentions in the Buildings of England series (itself a vast and detailed reference work by most standards). However, the earlier volumes largely ignored buildings built after 1800.

Due to the scale of the existing endeavour, there are no current plans to extend the project to take in the whole of Greater London. As of 2020, 53 volumes in the main series have been published. Separately, 18 monographs on individual buildings have been published. Most of the volumes have not been updated since publication, but those published online (up to Vol. 47) have received a limited amount of updating.

Since 2008, the Survey of London has been published by Yale University Press. With the publication of the volumes on Clerkenwell in 2008, colour photography was used for the first time, and the images incorporated in the text – previously they had been grouped separately as plates. A further volume on Woolwich was published in 2012, and two on Battersea appeared in late 2013. Two volumes on the eastern part of Marylebone, south of Marylebone Road, were issued in late 2017. Work has begun on Whitechapel, the historically rich and complex area on the eastern fringe of the City of London.

The British History Online digital library project of the Institute of Historical Research published all volumes up to 47 (Northern Clerkenwell and Pentonville) online, sponsored by English Heritage. Later volumes are published on the website of The Bartlett School of Architecture at University College London.

== Volumes ==
1. Bromley-by-Bow – C. R. Ashbee (editor) (1900) (LSC)
2. Chelsea, pt I – Walter H. Godfrey (1909) (LSC)
3. St Giles-in-the-Fields, pt I: Lincoln's Inn Fields – W. Edward Riley and Sir Laurence Gomme (editors) (1912) (LCC)
4. Chelsea, pt II – Walter H. Godfrey (1913) (LSC)
5. St Giles-in-the-Fields, pt II – W. Edward Riley and Sir Laurence Gomme (editors) (1914) (LSC)
6. Hammersmith – James Bird and Philip Norman (general editors) (1915) (LSC)
7. Chelsea, part III: The Old Church – Walter H. Godfrey (editor) (1921) (LSC)
8. Shoreditch – Sir James Bird (editor) (1922) (LCC)
9. The parish of St Helen, Bishopsgate, part I – Minnie Reddan and Alfred W. Clapham (1924) (LSC)
10. St. Margaret, Westminster, part I: Queen Anne's Gate area – Montague H. Cox (editor) (1926) (LCC)
11. Chelsea, part IV: The Royal Hospital – Walter H. Godfrey (editor) (1927) (LSC)
12. The parish of All Hallows Barking, part I: The Church of All Hallows – Lilian J. Redstone (1929) (LSC)
13. St Margaret, Westminster, part II: Whitehall I – Montagu H. Cox and Philip Norman (editors) (1930) (LCC)
14. St Margaret, Westminster, part III: Whitehall II – Montague H. Cox and G. Topham Forrest (editors) (1931) (LCC)
15. All Hallows, Barking-by-the-Tower, pt II – G. H. Gater and Walter H. Godfrey (general editors) (1934) (LSC)
16. St Martin-in-the-Fields I: Charing Cross – G. H. Gater and E. P. Wheeler (editors) (1935) (LCC)
17. The parish of St Pancras part 1: The village of Highgate – Percy Lovell and William McB. Marcham (editors) (1936) (LSC)
18. St Martin-in-the-Fields II: The Strand – G. H. Gater and E. P. Wheeler (editors) (1937) (LCC)
19. The parish of St Pancras part 2: Old St Pancras and Kentish Town – Percy Lovell and William McB. Marcham (editors) (1938) (LSC)
20. St Martin-in-the-Fields, pt III: Trafalgar Square & Neighbourhood – G. H. Gater and F. R. Hiorns (editor) (1940) (LCC)
21. The parish of St Pancras part 3: Tottenham Court Road & neighbourhood – J. R. Howard Roberts and Walter H. Godfrey (editors) (1949) (LSC)
22. Bankside (the parishes of St. Saviour and Christchurch Southwark) – Sir Howard Roberts and Walter H. Godfrey (editors) (1950) (LCC)
23. Lambeth: South Bank and Vauxhall – Sir Howard Roberts and Walter H. Godfrey (editors) (1951) (LCC)
24. The parish of St Pancras part 4: King's Cross Neighbourhood – Walter H. Godfrey and W. McB. Marcham (editors) (1952) (LSC)
25. St George's Fields (The parishes of St. George the Martyr Southwark and St. Mary Newington) – Ida Darlington (editor) (1955) (LCC)
26. Lambeth: Southern area – F. H. W. Sheppard (General Editor) (1956) (Athlone Press for the LCC)
27. Spitalfields and Mile End New Town – F. H. W. Sheppard (General Editor) (1957) (Athlone Press for the LCC)
28. Brooke House, Hackney – W. A. Eden, Marie P. G. Draper, W. F. Grimes and Audrey Williams (1960) (Athlone Press for the LCC)
29. St James Westminster, Part 1 (Vol I) – F. H. W. Sheppard (General Editor) (1960) (Athlone Press for the LCC)
30. St James Westminster, Part 1 (Vol II) – F. H. W. Sheppard (General Editor) (1960) (Athlone Press for the LCC)
31. St James Westminster, Part 2 (Vol I) – F. H. W. Sheppard (General Editor) (1963) (Athlone Press for the LCC)
32. St James Westminster, Part 2 (Vol II) – F. H. W. Sheppard (General Editor) (1963) (Athlone Press for the LCC)
33. St Anne Soho (Vol I) – F. H. W. Sheppard (General Editor) (1966) (Athlone Press for the GLC)
34. St Anne Soho (Vol II) – F. H. W. Sheppard (General Editor) (1966) (Athlone Press for the GLC)
35. The Theatre Royal, Drury Lane, and the Royal Opera House, Covent Garden – F. H. W. Sheppard (General Editor) (1970) ISBN 0-485-48235-5 (Athlone Press for the GLC)
36. The Parish of St. Paul Covent Garden – F. H. W. Sheppard (General Editor) (1970) ISBN 978-0-485-48236-2 (Athlone Press for the GLC)
37. Northern Kensington – F. H. W. Sheppard (General Editor) (1973) ISBN 978-0-485-48237-9 (Athlone Press for the GLC)
38. The Museums Area of South Kensington and Westminster – F. H. W. Sheppard (General Editor) (1975) ISBN 0-485-48238-X (Athlone Press for the GLC)
39. The Grosvenor Estate in Mayfair, Part 1 (General History) – F. H. W. Sheppard (General Editor) (1977) ISBN 978-0-485-48239-3 (Athlone Press for the GLC)
40. The Grosvenor Estate in Mayfair, Part 2 (The Buildings) – F. H. W. Sheppard (General Editor) (1980) ISBN 978-0-485-48240-9 (Athlone Press for the GLC)
41. Brompton – F. H. W. Sheppard (General Editor) (1983) ISBN 0-485-48241-X (Athlone Press for the GLC)
42. Kensington Square to Earl's Court – Hermione Hobhouse (General Editor) (1986) ISBN 0-485-48242-8 (Athlone Press for the GLC)
43. Poplar, Blackwall and Isle of Dogs (Vol I) – Hermione Hobhouse (General Editor) (1994) ISBN 0-485-48244-4 (Athlone Press for the RCHME)
44. Poplar, Blackwall and Isle of Dogs (Vol II) – Hermione Hobhouse (General Editor) (1994) ISBN 0-485-48244-4 (Athlone Press for the RCHME)
  (A supplement to Volumes 43 and 44 entitled Docklands in the Making: The Redevelopment of the Isle of Dogs, 1981–1995 by Alan Cox (ISBN 978-0-485-48500-4) was issued in 1995 in an attempt to keep up with the pace of redevelopment in the area)
45. Knightsbridge – John Greenacombe (General Editor) (2000) ISBN 0-485-48245-2 (Continuum Publishing for English Heritage)
46. South and East Clerkenwell – Philip Temple (Editor) (2008) ISBN 978-0-300-13727-9 (Yale University Press)
47. Northern Clerkenwell and Pentonville – Philip Temple (Editor) (2008) ISBN 978-0-300-13937-2 (Yale University Press)
48. Woolwich – Peter Guillery (Editor) (2012) ISBN 978-0-300-18722-9 (Yale University Press)
49. Battersea: Public, Commercial and Cultural – Andrew Saint (Editor) (2013) ISBN 978-0-300-19616-0 (Yale University Press)
50. Battersea: Houses and Housing – Colin Thom (Editor) (2013) ISBN 978-0-300-19617-7 (Yale University Press)
51. South-East Marylebone: Part 1 – Andrew Saint (General Editor) (2017) ISBN 978-0-300-22197-8 (Yale University Press)
52. South-East Marylebone: Part 2 – Andrew Saint (General Editor) (2017) ISBN 978-0-300-22197-8 (Yale University Press)
53. Oxford Street – Andrew Saint (General Editor) (2020) ISBN 978-1-913107-08-6 (Yale University Press)
54. Whitechapel Part 1 - Peter Guillery (editor) (2022) ISBN 978-1-913107-25-3 (Yale University Press)
55. Whitechapel Part 2 - Peter Guillery (editor) (2022) ISBN 978-1-913107-25-3 (Yale University Press)

As of 2026, research is ongoing for South-West Marylebone.

=== Monographs ===
Monographs, focusing only on one structure, were published during the existence of the voluntary survey committee. The first monograph predated the first Survey volume, and work on the subsequent publications was always outside the auspices of the LCC. The original sequence ended with the disbanding of the voluntary committee; the sixteenth volume represented work which had started under the committee's governance.

Almost thirty years later, a further monograph (No. 17) was published, focusing on County Hall and written by Hermione Hobhouse (1991). It was intended as a tribute to the LCC/GLC which, until its abolition in 1986, had responsibility for the Survey. Nearly twenty years after that, an eighteenth volume was issued, describing the Charterhouse in Smithfield and written by Philip Temple (2010).

1. Trinity Hospital, Mile End – C. R. Ashbee (1896)
2. Saint Mary, Stratford Bow – Osborn C. Hills (1900)
3. Old Palace, Bromley-by-Bow – Ernest Godman (1902)
4. The Great House, Leyton – Edwin Gunn (1903)
5. Brooke House, Hackney – Ernest A. Mann (1904)
6. St Dunstan's Church, Stepney – W. Pepys and Ernest Godman (1905)
7. East Acton Manor House – no author listed
8. Sandford Manor, Fulham – W. Arthur Webb (1907)
9. Crosby Place – Philip Norman (1908)
10. Morden College, Blackheath – Frank T. Green (1916)
11. Eastbury Manor House, Barking – Hubert Curtis (1917)
12. Cromwell House, Highgate – Philip Norman (1926)
13. Swakeleys, Ickenham – Walter H. Godfrey (1933)
14. The Queen's House, Greenwich – George H. Chettle (1937)
15. St. Bride's Church, Fleet Street – Walter H. Godfrey (1944)
16. College of Arms, Queen Victoria Street – Walter H. Godfrey and Anthony Wagner (1963)
17. County Hall – Hermione Hobhouse (1991)
18. The Charterhouse – Philip Temple (2010)
19. University College London: The Bloomsbury Campus - Amy Spencer and Colin Thom (editors) (2026)

== Presidents of the Committee ==
The voluntary Committee that began the project had a series of Honorary Presidents:

- Lord Leighton
- Right Rev. Dr. Mandell Creighton, Bishop of London
- George Curzon, 1st Marquess Curzon of Kedleston
- David Lindsay, 27th Earl of Crawford.

== See also ==
- Victoria County History
