= Hadspen Quarry =

Limestone quarry in Somerset, England

Coordinates: 51°04′53″N 2°29′40″W

Hadspen Quarry is a stone quarry in Somerset, England. It is shown on Ordnance Survey maps for 1888–90, and may have been in operation for a considerable period before that.

It supplies natural stone walling throughout the West Country. The products include coursed, coursed random and random rubble walling. The stone is still split and dressed at the quarry located close to Hadspen house and garden in the small village of Hadspen, within the parish of Pitcombe just outside Castle Cary.

This golden colour limestone is seen in buildings in western Dorset and the surrounding areas, as can be seen at the Fleet Street site in Beaminster. Other products include name plaques, sawn ashlar quoins and capping stones. The stone is an Inferior Oolite of the Garantiana Beds, dating back to the Middle Jurassic.

In 2003 Hadspen Quarry Limited was formed to extract and manufacture the stone that is known locally as Cary Stone

In 2007 Somerset County Council agreed a proposal to extend the size of the quarry by 0.3 hectares (0.74 acres).

in 2023 the business further diversified and opened a small glamping site known at Hadspen Glamping
