= Ansford Academy =

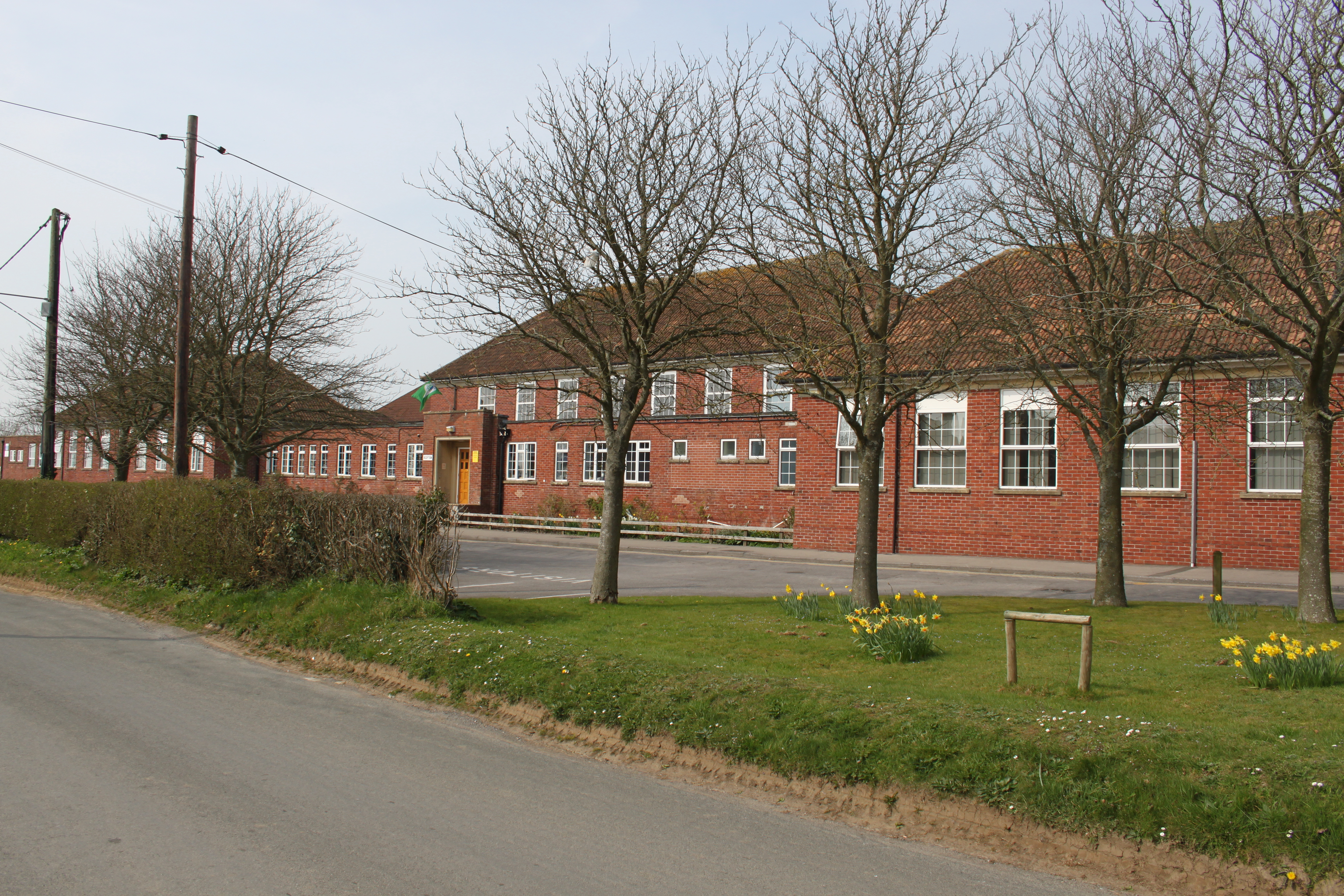

Location
- Maggs Lane; Castle Cary, Somerset, BA7 7JJ; England; 51.0960°N 2.5116°W

Information
- Former name: Ansford School
- Type: Secondary Academy
- Motto: 'Learning together to lead our lives'
- Established: 1940; 86 years ago
- Department for Education URN: 136839 Tables
- Ofsted: Reports
- Gender: Mixed
- Age: 11 to 16
- Enrolment: 575 (Data from January 2017)
- Capacity: 760 (Data from January 2017)
- Website: www.ansford.org.uk

Ansford Academy, previously known as Ansford School, is a school located in Ansford, which lies on the northern edge of Castle Cary in Somerset, England. The current head teacher is Karl Musson. In July 2011, the school became an Academy.

The main school building was completed in 1940 in a Neo-Georgian style. Additional classrooms for Science, Technology, Modern Languages, Art, ICT and a block for mathematics were added between the 70s-90s. A new £1.7 million Sports Centre was completed in 2005.

In the school's most recent Ofsted inspection, which took place between the 2 and 3 March 2022, a 'good' rating was given for every assessed category including overall effectiveness.

The associated sixth form college for Ansford Academy is Strode College.
