= Weston Longville =

Civil parish in Norfolk, England

Coordinates: 52.7°N 1.125°E

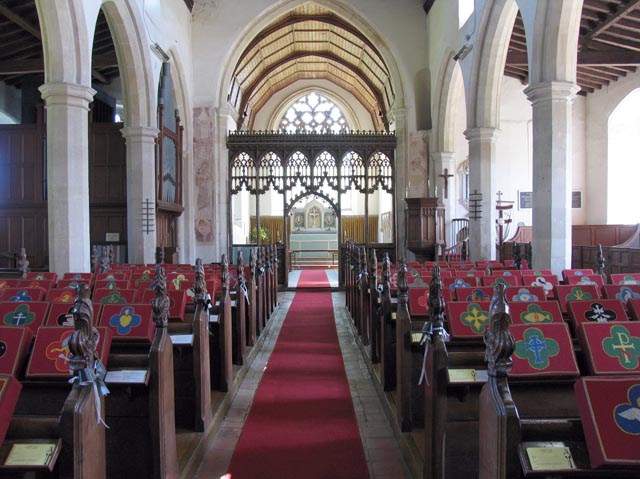
- Inside All Saints’ Church

- Location within Norfolk
- Area: 11.24 km^{2} (4.34 sq mi)
- Population: 339 (2011)
  - Density: 30/km^{2} (78/sq mi)
- OS grid reference: TG112159
- Civil parish: Weston Longville
- District: Broadland
- Shire county: Norfolk
- Region: East
- Country: England
- Sovereign state: United Kingdom
- Post town: NORWICH
- Postcode district: NR9
- Dialling code: 01603
- Police: Norfolk
- Fire: Norfolk
- Ambulance: East of England
- UK Parliament: Broadland and Fakenham

Weston Longville is a civil parish in the English county of Norfolk, approximately 8 miles (13 km) north-west of Norwich. Its name is derived from the Manor of Longaville in Normandy, France, which owned the local land in the 12th century. It covers an area of 11.24 km^{2} (4.34 sq mi) and had a population of 303 in 127 households at the 2001 census, increasing to a population of 339 in 144 households at the 2011 Census. For the purposes of local government, it falls within the district of Broadland.

== History ==
The village’s name means 'West farm/settlement'. 'Longville' is named after Longueville-sur-Scie, Normandy.

The Domesday Book of 1096 recorded that this manor was under the ownership of the Bishop of Bayeux, who may have commissioned the Domesday Book.

In Weston Longville, Stigand held one berewick TRE of fifty acres of land and twenty acres of meadow. There have always been six bordars and half a plough although it is i the valuation of Snettisham."

The village was home to the 18th-century clergyman and diarists, James Woodforde and his niece Anna Maria Woodforde. The village pub is named for James. He has a reputation as a man with a fondness for food which comes from the much edited published versions of his diaries; the originals provide a rich and unique insight into 18th-century rural English life. A complete and unabridged edition of his diary has been published in 17 volumes.

A World War II airfield located in the parish is now a turkey farm. Weston Hall and Park, also in the parish, have a golf course and a tourist attraction, the Dinosaur Adventure Park.
