= Pole baronets of Wolverton (1791) =

British hereditary dignities

Escutcheon of the Pole Baronets of Wolverton

The Pole (later van Notten-Pole) baronetcy, of Wolverton in the County of Southampton, was created in the Baronetage of Great Britain on 28 July 1791 for Charles Pole, a London merchant. Born Charles Van Notten, he was the son of Charles Van Notten, a merchant, of Amsterdam and London, (who was a descendant of Charles Van-Notten, who was created Lord of Ath and Van der Notten by Emperor Charles V, only son of Henry Van Notten, who was ennobled by Emperor Maximilian I in 1499) and his wife, Susanna Bosanquet. He married in 1769, Millicent, daughter of Charles Pole, of Holcroft, a scion of an ancient family of Radbourne Hall, Derbyshire and in 1787 changed his surname to Pole.

The baronetcy was created with remainder to the heirs male of his body, failing which to the heirs male of his daughter Susannah, wife of Isaac Minet (however, her male line is understood to have become extinct on the death of her son). His son, the second Baronet, sat as Tory Member of Parliament for Yarmouth and sold Wolverton House to the Duke of Wellington in 1837.

The third Baronet of Todenham House, Gloucestershire, was High Sheriff of Warwickshire in 1856. He assumed in 1853 by Royal licence the additional surname of Van Notten. This line of the family failed on the death of the fourth Baronet in 1948. He was succeeded by the fifth Baronet, a descendant of General Edward Pole, fourth son of the second Baronet. He uses the surname of Pole only.

== Pole (later van Notten-Pole) baronets, of Wolverton (1791) ==
- Sir Charles Pole, 1st Baronet (1735–1813)
- Sir Peter Pole, 2nd Baronet (1770–1850)
- Sir Peter van Notten-Pole, 3rd Baronet (1801–1887)
- Sir Cecil Pery van Notten-Pole, 4th Baronet (1863–1948)
- Sir Peter van Notten Pole, 5th Baronet (1921–2010)
- Sir (Peter) John Chandos Pole, 6th Baronet (born 1952)

The heir apparent is the present holder's son Michael van Notten Pole.

== Notes ==
Baronetage of Great Britain
| Preceded by Woodford baronets | Pole baronets of Wolverton; 28 July 1791 | Succeeded by Vaughan baronets |
