= Woodford baronets =

Escutcheon of the Woodford baronets of Carleby

The Woodford baronetcy, of Carleby in the County of Lincoln, was a title in the Baronetage of Great Britain. It was created on 28 July 1791 for Ralph Woodford, the former Ambassador to Denmark. During the period from the Peace of Paris of 1783, which included an Anglo-Spanish treaty, and the Nootka Sound Convention of 1790, he had been engaged in efforts to negotiate a commercial treaty with the Spanish Empire, under the Marquess of Carmarthen; which were terminated, however, by the Nootka Crisis.

The 2nd Baronet was Governor of Trinidad between 1813 and 1828. The title became extinct on his death the latter year.

== Woodford baronets, of Carleby (1791) ==
- Sir Ralph Woodford, 1st Baronet (c. 1735–1810)
- Sir Ralph James Woodford, 2nd Baronet (c. 1784–1828)

Baronetage of Great Britain
Preceded by Jackson baronets	Woodford baronets of Carleby; 28 July 1791	Succeeded by Pole baronets
