= Pitcombe =

Village and civil parish in Somerset, England

Coordinates: 51.100°N 2.466°W

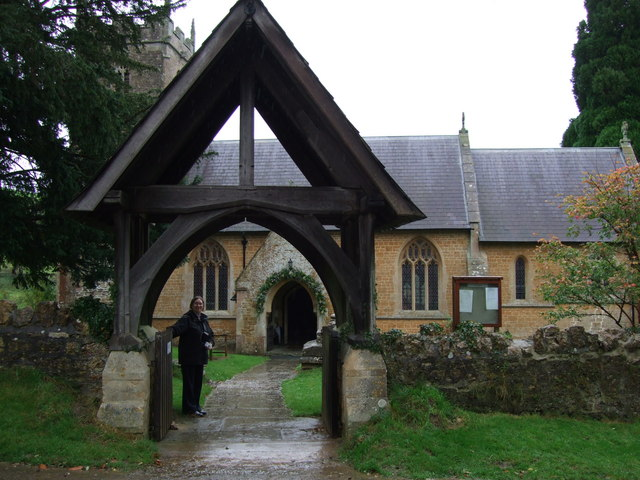
- St Leonard's Church

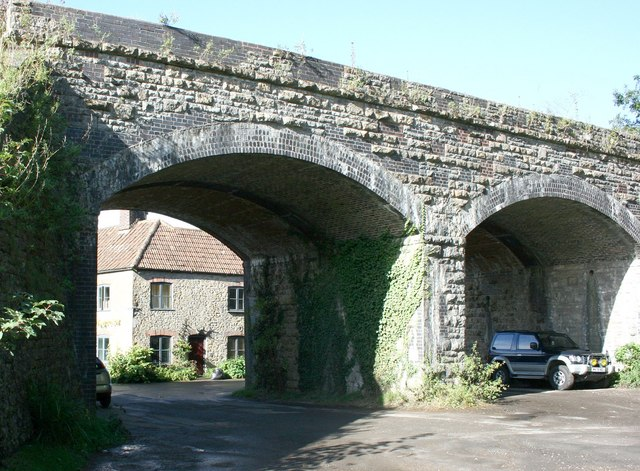
- Railway viaduct

- Location within Somerset
- Population: 342 (in 2021)
- OS grid reference: ST675335
- Unitary authority: Somerset Council
- Ceremonial county: Somerset
- Region: South West
- Country: England
- Sovereign state: United Kingdom
- Post town: Bruton
- Postcode district: BA10
- Police: Avon and Somerset
- Fire: Devon and Somerset
- Ambulance: South Western
- UK Parliament: Glastonbury and Somerton
- Website: Parish Council

Pitcombe is a village and civil parish 1 mile (2 km) south-west of Bruton and 5 miles (8 km) from Wincanton in Somerset, England. The parish includes the hamlets of Cole, Godminster and Hadspen, and had a population of 342 at the 2021 census.

The village lies on the River Pitt and other streams that flow into the River Brue.

Godminster Lane Quarry and Railway Cutting is a geological Site of Special Scientific Interest important for study of the Inferior Oolite limestones of Middle Jurassic age. The rocks contain a rich assemblage of fossil ammonites typical of the north Dorset/south Somerset area. It is also important as a reference site for three sub-divisions (zones) of the Inferior Oolite – the laeviscula, discites and concavum zones.

== History ==
The name Pitcombe means "the marshy valley".

Evidence of prehistoric activity has been found near Godminster Farm, where a Roman coin hoard was also discovered.

In the Domesday Book of 1086 the manor was held by Turstin FitzRolf and already had two watermills.

Pitcombe was part of the hundred of Bruton.

It was on the Somerset and Dorset Joint Railway, now disused.

== Governance ==
The parish council has responsibility for local issues, including setting an annual precept (local rate) to cover the council's operating costs and producing annual accounts for public scrutiny. The parish council evaluates local planning applications and works with the local police, district council officers, and neighbourhood watch groups on matters of crime, security, and traffic. The parish council's role also includes initiating projects for the maintenance and repair of parish facilities, as well as consulting with the district council on the maintenance, repair, and improvement of highways, drainage, footpaths, public transport, and street cleaning. Conservation matters (including trees and listed buildings) and environmental issues are also the responsibility of the council.

For local government purposes, since 1 April 2023, the parish comes under the unitary authority of Somerset Council. Prior to this, it was part of the non-metropolitan district of South Somerset (established under the Local Government Act 1972). It was part of Wincanton Rural District before 1974.

It is also part of a county constituency represented in the House of Commons of the Parliament of the United Kingdom. It elects one Member of Parliament (MP) by the first past the post system of election.

== Landmarks ==
Hadspen house and garden is within the parish. The house was built for William Player in the late 17th century, but has undergone several major restorations. It is built of Cary stone ashlar, with a hipped Welsh slate roof behind parapets and stone chimney stacks. It has been designated by English Heritage as a grade II* listed building. It has been converted into a luxury hotel, and the grounds into the attraction, named The Newt in Somerset, which opened in 2019.

There is still a working quarry within the parish of Pitcombe, notably Hadspen Quarry Ltd located in Higher Hadspen. They provide the stone to the locality which gives this area in South Somerset its local unique characteristics of honey coloured buildings.

Gants Mill is an 18th-century watermill with 13th-century origins. It is a Grade II* listed building and now has a turbine producing hydroelectricity.

Godminster Manor is a 15th-century manor house which underwent extensive restoration following a fire in 1924.

Cole Manor dates from the 17th century.

The dismantled Somerset and Dorset Joint Railway passes through the village over a viaduct. At the north of the village is the old Cole Railway Station.

The village is the home of Bruton School for Girls.

The Newt Estate is a working estate that produces cider.

== Religious sites ==
The church, dedicated to St Leonard, has a 15th-century tower at the west end containing six bells. The church was rebuilt, with the exception of its tower, in 1858. It has been designated by English Heritage as a Grade II listed building.

== Notable residents ==
- Herbert John "Bert" Pitman (1877–1961), Third Officer on board the Titanic
- Henry Hobhouse (1854–1937) Justice of the Peace and Liberal Member of Parliament from 1885 until 1906
