= Charles Woodford =

Charles Woodford may refer to:

- Charles Morris Woodford (1852–1927), British naturalist and government minister
- Charles W. Woodford (1931–2009), American businessman and Illinois Treasurer
