= Woodford (ship) =

Several ships have been named Woodford:

- Woodford (1790 EIC ship) was launched in 1790 and made nine voyages as an East Indiaman for the British East India Company (EIC). In 1797 her captain was commodore of a small group of East Indiamen that managed to bluff a French squadron of warships into sailing away to avoid an engagement. In 1812 Woodford was sold for breaking up.
- Woodford (1815 ship) was launched at Whitby as a West Indiaman. Between 1816 and 1817 she made two voyages to the Indian Ocean or the East Indies. She was wrecked at Laeso in November 1837.
- Woodford (1819 ship) was launched at Bristol in 1819. She made one voyage as an "extra ship" for the EIC. She also made two voyages transporting convicts from England to Van Diemen's Land. She sank in February 1829 off Madagascar.
