= Samuel Woodforde =

English painter

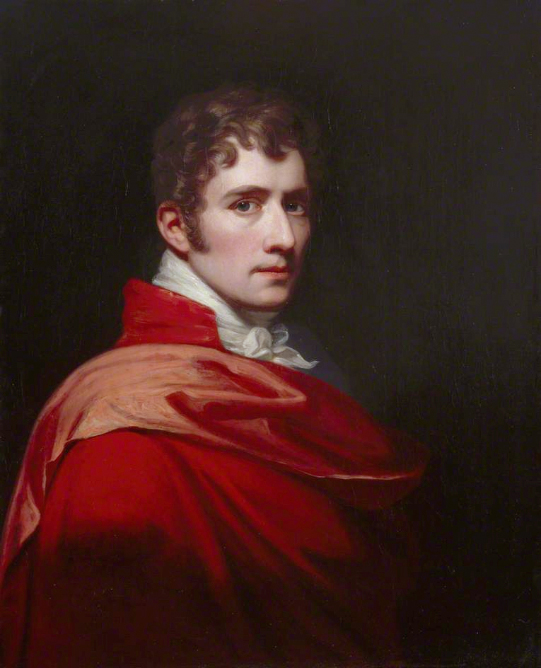
1805 self-portrait of Woodforde

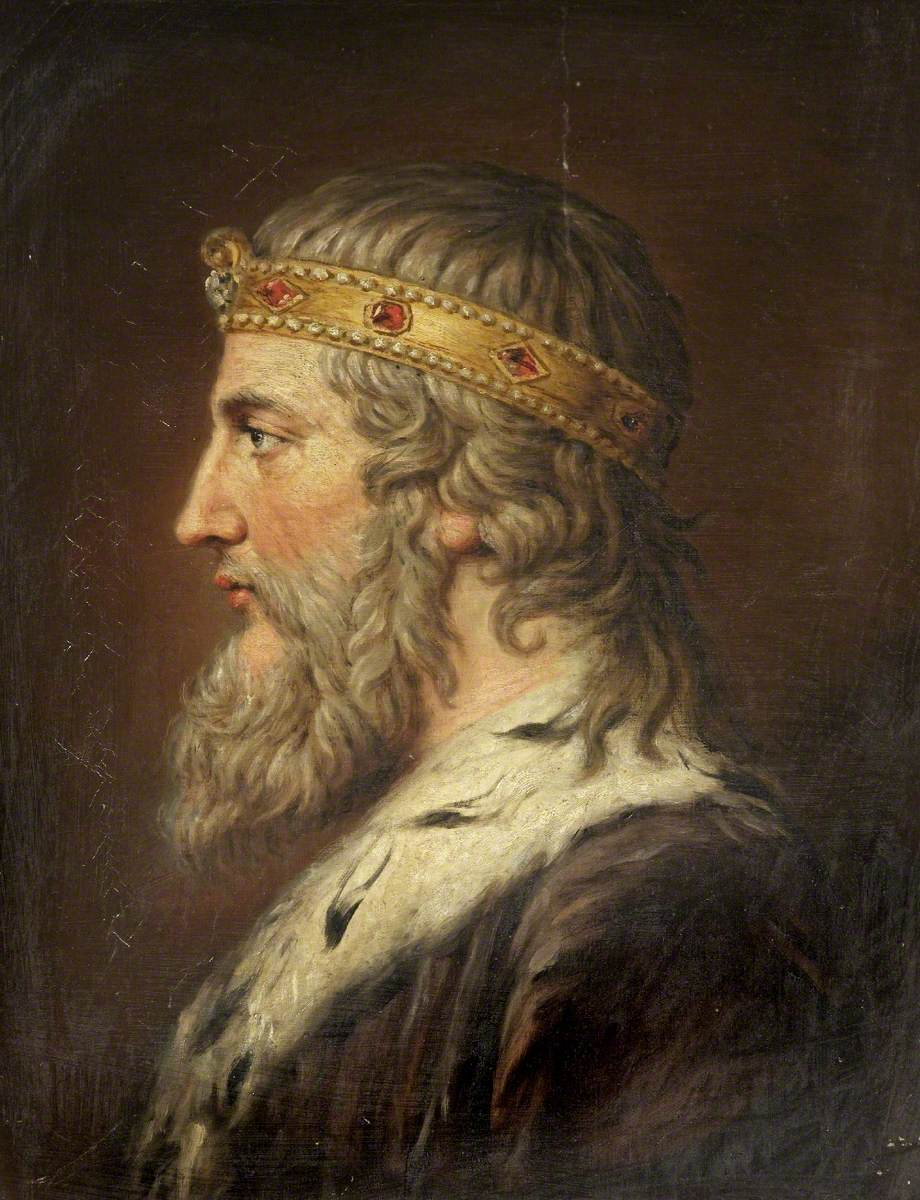
1800–1815 portrait of Alfred the Great attributed to Woodforde

The Cottage Window, 1814

Samuel Woodforde RA (29 March 1763 – 27 July 1817) was an English painter.

== Life ==
Woodforde was born at Castle Cary, Somerset. He was the second son of Heighes Woodforde, an accountant of Ansford, and his wife Anne. He was a lineal descendant of the painter Samuel Woodford, and nephew of the diarist, James Woodforde. He was supported by the banker Henry Hoare of Stourhead, Wiltshire and his family. On 8 March 1782, he became a student at the Royal Academy Schools and started exhibiting pictures in 1784. He contributed no less than 133 pictures to the Royal Academy and 39 at the British Institution.

Richard Hoare granted Woodforde £100 a year, which allowed him to travel to Italy in 1786. He spent most of his time in Rome, studying the works of Raphael, Michelangelo, and Paolo Veronese. He also visited Venice and Florence before returning to London in 1791. Between 1792 and 1815, "he exhibited constantly, showing portraits, scenes of Italian life, historical pictures, and subjects from literature". Many of his literary pictures were engraved, such as a scene from Titus Andronicus by Anker Smith for the Boydell Shakespeare edition (1805) and several other scenes for Longmans Shakespeare (1805–7). Woodforde became an associate of the Royal Academy in 1800 and a full member in 1807.

On 7 October 1815 he married Jane Gardner; that year the couple left for Italy. Two years later, Woodforde died of fever at Bologna where he is buried in the cemetery of La Certosa.
