= Hadspen House =

Building in Hadspen, Somerset, England

- Ornamental pond and Hadspen House in 2023

- Location within Somerset

General information
- Location: Pitcombe, England
- Coordinates: 51.0776°N 2.4864°W
- Completed: 18th century

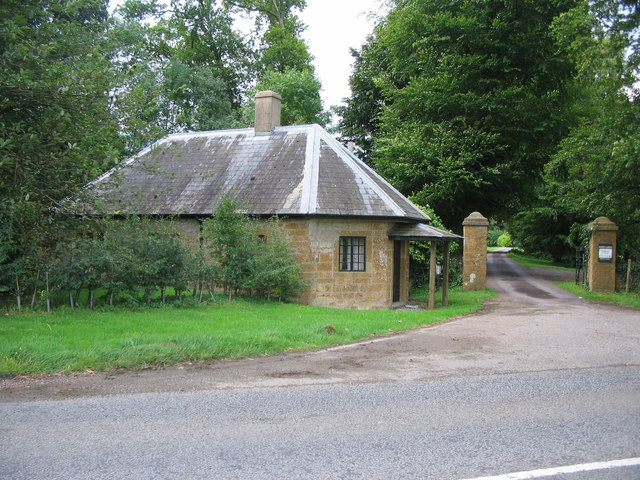
The entrance to Hadspen House in 2007

Hadspen House of Hadspen, Somerset, England is built of Cary stone, mined from Hadspen Quarry. The stone is a soft limestone known for its deep burnt-orange colour. It is an inferior oolite of the Garantiana Beds and dates to the Middle Jurassic. The house has been designated by English Heritage as a grade II* listed building.

In 2013, the property was sold to South Africans, Karen Roos and her billionaire husband Koos Bekker, who converted the house into a luxury hotel, and the grounds into the attraction, The Newt in Somerset, which opened in 2019.

== House ==
Hadspen House is said to have begun as a farmhouse, purchased by the London lawyer William Player in 1687 on the Hadspen estate,[1] Player "built the forefront of a gentleman's house in Byfleet Close, a barn, two stables and ox house." Player's expansion continued for 10–12 years. It included building walls around a court, adding a service wing, "a stall for 24 cattle, a farm baliff's house, a brewhouse" and modern plumbing, with a lead pipe water supply. Player also began the garden, planting extensively on both sides of the house and trees, behind, south and north of the house, that included beeches, elms, poplars, ashes and cherries.

Hadspen is noted as Hatch-been on John Ward's map around 1650. Yet Hadspen House and Hadspen are located on maps as early as 1736, as a gentleman's seat on the eastern edge of Castle Cary Manor. By 1822, Hadspen House and Hadspen are shown as a significant landed estate on C. & J. Greenwood's 1820-21 survey, the Nobility Clergy and Gentry of Somersetshire.

Player sold Hadspen House to Vickris Dickinson 60 years later, in 1747. Twenty years later, in 1767, Vickris Dickinson sold it to Charles Medows and it was then sold to John Ford. Medows began its expansion and improvement in 1767, which Ford continued.

In 1785 Henry Hobhouse II, a lawyer and head of the Bristol Bar, purchased Hadspen and Hadspen House, significantly expanding the Hobhouse land ownership in Somersetshire and establishing the Hobhouse family seat. "The Hobhouses were Bristol merchants who had recently established themselves as country gentlemen." Henry Hobhouse I and his brother Isaac made their fortune as Bristol merchants in the slave, sugar and tobacco trades between Bristol, Africa, the West Indies and Virginia in the early and mid-18th century.

At the time of purchase in 1785, the Hadspen estate comprised 717 acres. Hadspen House was "a modern stone-built House of Six rooms on a floor with marble chimney-pieces, stabling for 20 horses, a good garden and extensive woodland." In 1786 and 1786, Henry Hobhouse II continued to expand the house and the furnishings. His alterations in 1786-87 included "raising the ceilings of the front rooms, adding a new dining room to the north-east, three reception rooms, the drawing and library rooms and reroofing the house in grey Welsh slate." His alterations turned Hadspen House into the grand 18th century Georgian manor house which it is known as today.

Major alterations to the rear were made by his heir, the Right Honourable Henry Hobhouse, in 1828. His son Henry, a landowner, again made major alterations to the rear in 1886, as did the latter's son, Sir Arthur Lawrence, liberal politician and architect of national parks of England and Wales, in 1909.

Within the original grounds are a coachhouse, cottage, granary, southwest lodge, stables summerhouse and a number of modern follies. The clock house barn was converted into a five-bedroom dwelling in 2000.

== Landscape garden ==
In the early 18th century, William Player created gardens a la française with geometric plantings with courts, fountains and three axes in the 300 acres surrounding the house. At the height of the landscape garden movement, Henry Hobhouse had Player's strict geometry cut with picturesque vistas and rolling hills. In the 1960s, Penelope Hobhouse transformed the walled parabola vegetable garden, planting within and around it a 20th-century Arts and Crafts garden. It opened to visitors in 1970 and appeared in Penelope Hobhouse's 1976 publication The Country Gardener.

In 1987 the garden was leased to Canadian gardeners and authors Nori and Sandra Pope. In 2007 Niall Hobhouse sponsored a competition for its redesign.
