= John Woodford (British Army officer) =

British Army officer

Major-General Sir John Woodfood KCB KCH
- Born: 28 February 1785; Chartham Deanery, Canterbury
- Died: 22 March 1879 (aged 94); Keswick
- Relatives: Sir Alexander Woodford (brother)
- Military career
- Allegiance: United Kingdom
- Branch: British Army
- Service years: 1800–1841
- Rank: Major-General
- Unit: Grenadier Guards
- Conflicts: Napoleonic Wars; Battle of Copenhagen; Peninsular War; Battle of Corunna (WIA); Battle of Nivelle; Battle of the Nive; Battle of Orthez; Battle of Toulouse; Hundred Days; Battle of Waterloo
- Awards: Army Gold Cross; Military General Service Medal

Major-General Sir John George Woodford KCB KCH (28 February 1785 – 22 March 1879) was a British Army officer who has been called "possibly the first battlefield archaeologist". He served in the Napoleonic Wars, and in 1818, did archaeological work in the area surrounding the Battle of Agincourt.

Woodford played a large role in military reform before his retirement in 1841. Battlefield archaeologist Tim Sutherland called him the last living British officer to have served at the Battle of Waterloo.

== Life ==
=== Early life and family ===
Born the son of Lieutenant-Colonel John Woodford and Lady Susan Gordan (daughter of Cosmo Gordon, 3rd Duke of Gordon), Woodford was the younger brother of his fellow officer Field-Marshal Sir Alexander George Woodford. Woodford also had three half-sisters: Susan Drummond, Elizabeth Lowther, and Lady Mary Fludyer. He was educated at Harrow under Joseph Drury. The foundations of his military career started in 1800, when he was sent to Brunswick, which was at the time in a personal union with the Kingdom of Great Britain, due to the accession of the Elector of Hanover as King George I in 1714.

=== Military career ===
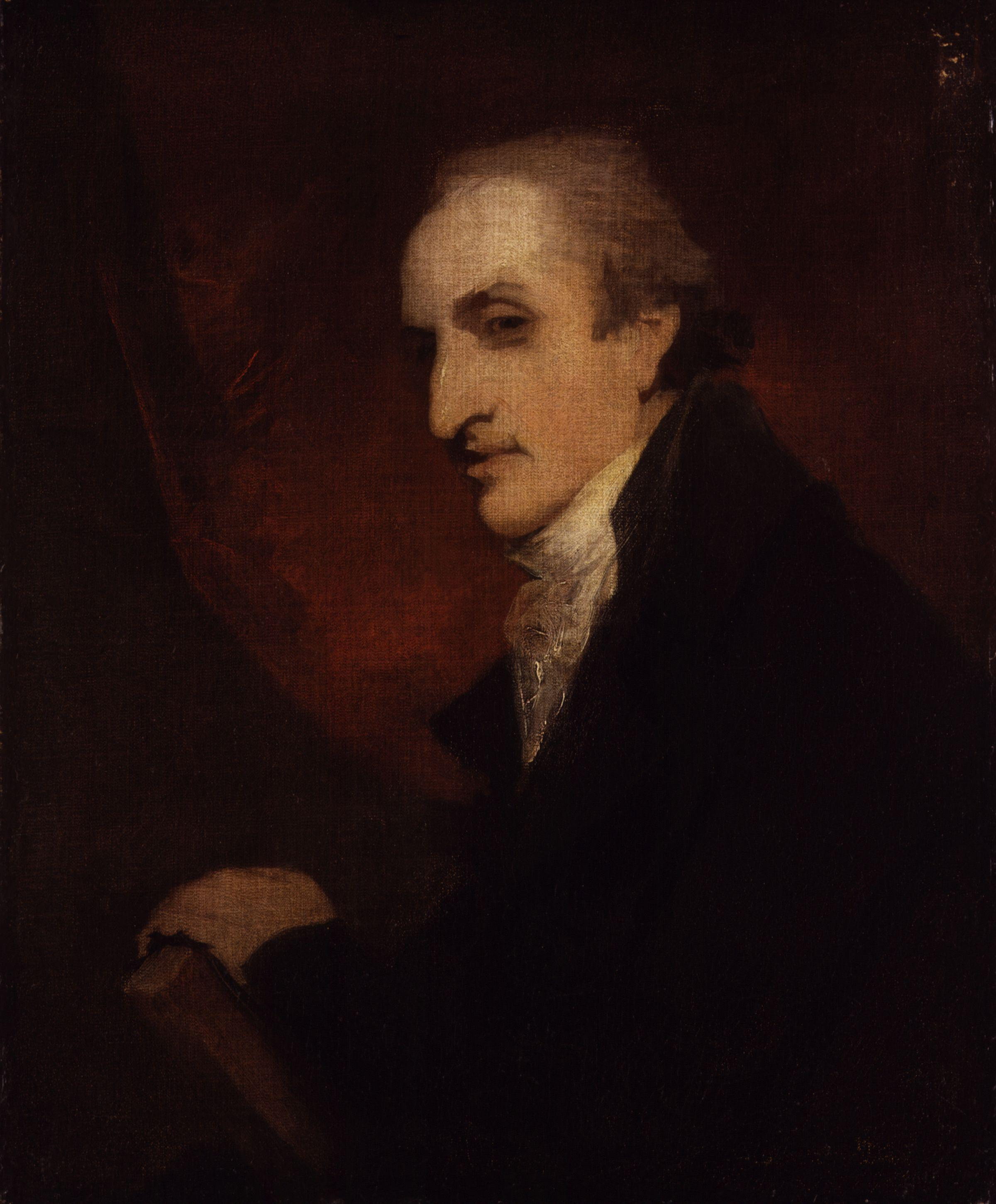
William Douglas, 4th Duke of Queensberry, who befriended Woodford

Granted a commission as an ensign in the first regiment of the Grenadier Guards by the Duke of Gloucester in May 1800, Woodford finished his time training in Brunswick before his return to Great Britain to join his regiment in 1801. Upon his return, he was befriended by William Douglas, 4th Duke of Queensberry, who presented him with a fine horse and led him to the King at Windsor. This friendship proved fortunate, as Douglas left him £10,000 in 1810. Although Woodford joined the regiment in 1801, he did not see active service until 1807, when he was involved in the Battle of Copenhagen. Following this, in 1808, he was sent to the Peninsula under the command of Sir David Baird to join with the forces of Sir John Moore. Here, Woodford was appointed deputy-assistant quartermaster-general and aide-de-camp to Moore. Involved in the retreat to Corunna, it is said that Woodford's heel was injured by the last shot fired in the Battle of Corunna at dusk. As a result of this, Woodford was unfit for military service for eighteen months until he was able to join the Duke of Wellington's army, which had just crossed the Ebro. Woodford continued his previous roles and was a participant in numerous battles, including Nivelle, Nive, Orthez, and Toulouse.

In 1813, Woodford had purchased a captaincy in the first regiment of the Grenadier Guards. Upon the return of Napoleon in 1815, Woodford served in the fourth division under Lieutenant-General Sir Charles Colville as a lieutenant-colonel in the 1st Foot Guards. This division was detailed to support Prince Frederick of the Netherlands on the road to Halle. However, Woodford was dispatched by Colville to Wellington for orders. Arriving in the early morning, Wellington ordered Woodford to remain by his side as an aide-de-camp due to the imminence of the battle. Tim Sutherland, in his TV series Medieval Dead, stated that Woodford was the last living British officer to have fought at Waterloo. Following the battle, Woodford continued to serve under Colville and assisted in the occupation of Cambrai. In 1818, Woodford was appointed to the command of the Army of the Occupation in France until its withdrawal in October of that year. Woodford was made a C.B. in 1815.

==== Archaeological work at Agincourt ====
Map of the Battle of Agincourt

During his time as the commander of the Army of the Occupation in France, Woodford engaged in archaeological excavations on the supposed site of the Battle of Agincourt. During these excavations, Woodford found numerous artifacts, and these finds were reported by newspapers at the times, including the Caledonian Mercury on 25 May 1818 and The Morning Chronicle on 20 April 1818. They included bones, arrow-heads and upwards of sixty coins. One such coin was in a high state of preservation, on the one side the arms of France and the inscription Karolus Dei Gracia Francorum Rex (translated from Latin as Charles, by God's Grace, King of the French) and on the reverse PC Regnat, PC Imperat ('PC' standing for the Latin per Christum, 'regnat' for 'reign' or 'rule' and 'imperat' for 'command', 'rule' or 'impose'). Fragments of iron, two lance-heads (one six, the other eight inches long), a spur, buckles, 'other insignia of the fray' and several rings. These rings, some of which were gold, had inscriptions on them, and were thought to be pledges, which were 'given to the Knights by their fair Dames, on departing to the wars'. One ring is enamelled and on the outside has the words pleine amitie (roughly translated from French as 'solid friendship') and inside a flower like a rose, with 'belle' after it. It is thought this could create the name of a lady, Rosabelle. Another ring, made of brass, was found with a finger bone sticking in it. Unfortunately, the present-day locations of these finds are unknown.

Records of the excavations and the finds exist in Woodford's letters to his brother, Alexander, which was preserved in the Nachlaß of the English politician Roger Newdigate (1719–1806). These letters also include illustrations of certain finds, namely a coin and an arrow-head. Alongside the discoveries, there is also thought to have existed a diary, although it is suspected this may have been lost in a fire at an establishment on Belgrave Square called the Pantechnicon, which gave its name to the van, in 1874 or 1876. Whilst excavating, Woodford received considerable hostility from the local French, who considered Woodford to be desecrating the graves of the war-dead to conduct a celebration commemorating the English victory. This appears to have been little but spin, as the letters highlight Woodford's intention to re-bury any dead which he found in consecrated ground – this he did, as there is reported to be several dead from Azincourt buried in the local church under an etching in the wall that reads '1838'.

==== Military reform ====
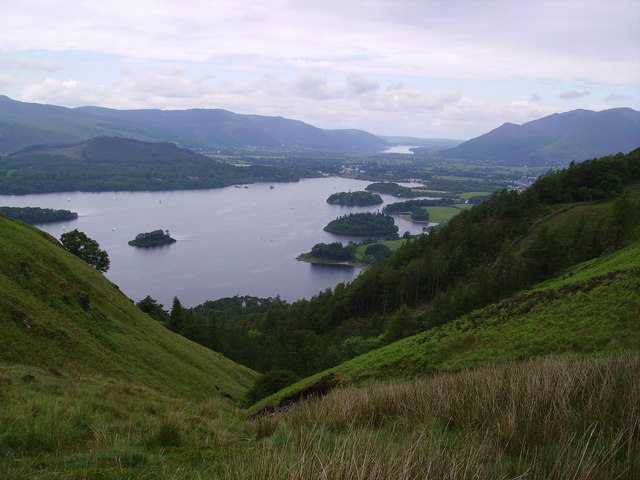
Derwent Water, the retirement destination of Woodford

Following the Napoleonic Wars and the excavations at Azincourt, Woodford returned home and in 1821 was given command of the third battalion of the Grenadier Guards in Dublin. He became a colonel on 23 November 1823. Under his command, he forbade flogging in the battalion and on 26 May 1830, banned standing under arms as a punishment. In 1835, Woodford published a pamphlet entitled Remarks on Military Flogging: its Causes and Effects, with some Considerations on the Propriety of its entire Abolition. In this, he recommended recreation for soldiers in barracks, the establishment of carpenters' shops, et cetera, to teach the men useful trades in addition to the establishment of regimental libraries. These reforms met the disapproval of Wellington and the King, William IV, although they remained in place. In part due to Woodford's advocacy, the purchase of commissions and the stock were abolished in 1871 (Cardwell Reforms) and 1855 respectively.

=== Retirement and later life ===
In 1841, in the will of his aunt, Lady Frances Gordon, wife of Lord William Gordon and daughter of Charles Ingram, 9th Viscount of Irvine, Woodford received an estate on the western bank of Derwent Water, which included Waterend House. Issuing his last regimental order on 10 January 1837, he was promoted to the rank of major-general and retired from service in October 1841. Woodford was made a K.C.B. in 1838. Due to his belief that the purchase of commissions should be abolished, Woodford sold his commission to the government for £4,500, half of its market value. Throughout the rest of his long retirement, Woodford surrounded himself with rare books and curiosities in addition to antiquarian research. He was said to have been a good linguist and lived life in retirement in a soldierly-manner as if still in camp. He died on 22 March 1879 in Keswick.

== Sources ==
- Crosthwaite, J. Fisher (2010). Brief Memoir of Major-General Sir John George Woodford. Kessinger Publishing. ISBN 978-1165331253.
