= John Woodforde =

English settler in Adelaide

Dr John Woodforde (c. 1808 – April 1866) was a medical professional, one of the earliest settlers to the British colony of South Australia and its capital, Adelaide.

== History ==
Woodforde was born in Somerset, a son of Dr John Woodforde and his wife Harriet. He gained his medical qualifications in 1832 and sailed for South Australia aboard Rapid, one of the "First Fleet of South Australia", as surgeon to the survey party brought out by Colonel Light, arriving in August, 1836. He continued to practice after the survey party dissolved, with his surgery on Hindley Street "opposite the old Blenheim Hotel". He succeeded to the post of City Coroner with the death of George Stevenson JP (c. 1799 – 19 October 1856). He remained Light's personal physician, and with Dr. Edward Wright attended him in his final illness, and was one of his pallbearers.

In 1844, he was one of the founding members of the Medical Board of South Australia, and from 1849 to 1852 a medical officer at the Adelaide Hospital, resigning to concentrate on his private practice.

In 1847, he was one of the 65 proprietors of what became St Peter's College. At least two of his sons, however, were students at J. L. Young's Adelaide Educational Institution (AEI).

He died aged around 57, leaving a widow Caroline and five children.

It is not likely that the Adelaide suburb of Woodforde was named in his honour.

== Family ==
Woodforde married Caroline Carter (c. 1813 – 29 August 1878) on 18 August 1837. Carter arrived aboard Isabella in February 1837, having befriended the Hack family on the voyage. Their eight children included:

- William John (or John William) Woodforde (20 January 1841 – 4 June 1910) married Margaret Theresa Lennon on 20 July 1868. He was a member of Stuart's 1862 expedition but was dismissed for insubordination on account of his refusal to be parted with his greatcoat. Another issue was Woodforde's keeping a personal diary, contrary to Stuart's instructions.
- Harriet Julia Woodforde (23 April 1842 – 24 November 1912) married Thomas Joseph Shuldham O'Halloran (c. 1836 – 9 January 1922), eldest son of Thomas Shuldham O'Halloran, on 23 April 1862
- Caroline Annie Woodforde (c. 1844 – 22 August 1863)
- Frank Dudley Woodforde (6 April 1846 – 1 March 1907) was a prize-winning student at AEI 1854–1862 and was employed by the National Bank, later practiced as accountant. He married Jane Beckett in 1873, had five sons.
- Meliora Woodforde (12 February 1848 – 27 December 1933) married Robert Cussen on 10 January 1872
- George Woodforde (c. 1850 – 19 January 1933) was a prize-winning student at AEI 1860–1864. He moved to Victoria, married Elizabeth Ann Forman in 1893, died at St Kilda
- Arthur Woodforde (10 February 1854 - 18 June 1854)

Further genealogical information may be found at the First Eight Ships website

Woodforde had a home on Hindley Street before moving to his property (Town acres 747 and 900) in North Adelaide.

== Journal ==
Extensive extracts from Dr. Woodforde's "Rapid" Journal (May 1836 – April 1837) were published in 1894 by the Port Augusta Dispatch

- Echoes from the Past. (1894, July 13). The Port Augusta Dispatch, Newcastle and Flinders Chronicle (SA : 1885 - 1916), p. 4. Retrieved 19 January 2021 - via National Library of Australia.
- Echoes from the Past. (1894, July 20). The Port Augusta Dispatch, Newcastle and Flinders Chronicle (SA : 1885 - 1916), p. 4. Retrieved 19 January 2021 - via National Library of Australia.
- District Council of Kanyaka. (1894, July 20). The Port Augusta Dispatch, Newcastle and Flinders Chronicle (SA : 1885 - 1916), p. 4. Retrieved 19 January 2021 - via National Library of Australia.
- Echoes from the Past. (1894, August 3). The Port Augusta Dispatch, Newcastle and Flinders Chronicle (SA : 1885 - 1916), p. 4. Retrieved 19 January 2021 - via National Library of Australia.
- Echoes from the Past. (1894, August 10). The Port Augusta Dispatch, Newcastle and Flinders Chronicle (SA : 1885 - 1916), p. 4. Retrieved 19 January 2021 - via National Library of Australia.
- “Paving the Way.” (1894, August 10). The Port Augusta Dispatch, Newcastle and Flinders Chronicle (SA : 1885 - 1916), p. 2. Retrieved 19 January 2021 - via National Library of Australia.
