= Ansford =

Village in Somerset, England

Coordinates: 51.0938°N 2.5143°W

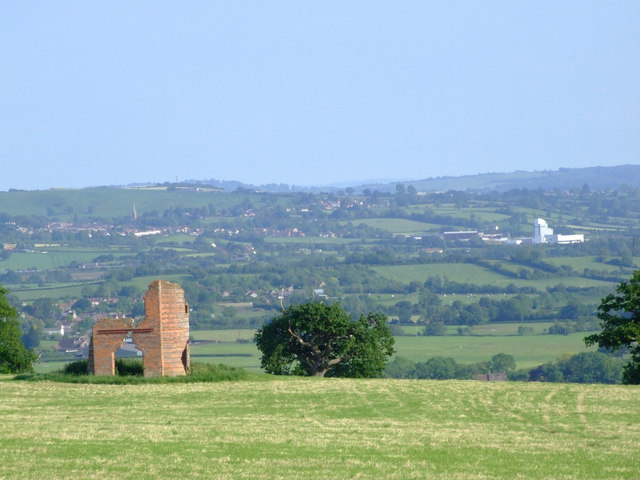
- Ansford from Ditcheat Hill

- Location within Somerset
- Population: 1,175 (2021)
- OS grid reference: ST640328
- Civil parish: Ansford
- Unitary authority: Somerset Council
- Ceremonial county: Somerset
- Region: South West
- Country: England
- Sovereign state: United Kingdom
- Post town: Castle Cary
- Postcode district: BA7
- Dialling code: 01963
- Police: Avon and Somerset
- Fire: Devon and Somerset
- Ambulance: South Western
- UK Parliament: Glastonbury and Somerton

Ansford is a village and civil parish in Somerset, England, on the northern edge of Castle Cary, with a population of 1,175.

The village lies on the A371, close to Castle Cary railway station and the River Brue, where the bridge dates from 1823.

== Governance ==
The parish council has responsibility for local issues, including setting an annual precept (local rate) to cover the council's operating costs and producing annual accounts for public scrutiny. The parish council evaluates local planning applications and works with the local police, district council officers, and neighbourhood watch groups on matters of crime, security, and traffic. The parish council's role also includes initiating projects for the maintenance and repair of parish facilities, as well as consulting with the district council on the maintenance, repair, and improvement of highways, drainage, footpaths, public transport, and street cleaning. Conservation matters (including trees and listed buildings) and environmental issues are also the responsibility of the council.

For local government purposes, since 1 April 2023, the village comes under the unitary authority of Somerset Council. Prior to this, it was part of the non-metropolitan district of South Somerset, which was formed on 1 April 1974 under the Local Government Act 1972, having previously been part of Wincanton Rural District.

It is also part of the Glastonbury and Somerton county constituency represented in the House of Commons of the Parliament of the United Kingdom. It elects one Member of Parliament (MP) by the first past the post system of election, and was part of the South West England constituency of the European Parliament prior to Britain leaving the European Union in January 2020, which elected seven MEPs using the d'Hondt method of party-list proportional representation.

== Landmarks ==
The nearby Hadspen house and garden includes the house which is a grade II* listed building, and a private park with formal gardens created by William Player.

== Education ==
There is a Secondary School called Ansford Academy which has over 700 students aged 11–16.

== Religious sites ==
There is a Methodist church and the Church of England St Andrew's, which has a 15th-century tower, with the remainder of the church being rebuilt by Charles Edmund Giles in 1861.

== Notable residents ==
It was the birthplace of clergyman and diarist James Woodforde and, in 1763, his nephew Samuel Woodforde.
