= Ralph Woodford =

Governor of Trinidad and Tobago

Sir Ralph James Woodford Bt
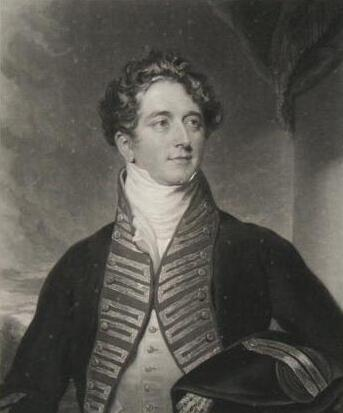
- Engraving by Charles Turner made in 1829, after Woodford's death
- Born: 1784
- Died: 17 May 1828 (aged 43–44)
- Occupation: Diplomat
- Known for: Governor of Trinidad

Sir Ralph James Woodford, 2nd Baronet (1784–17 May 1828), was a British colonial administrator who was the longest-serving governor of Trinidad. Young and energetic, from 1813 he sought to bring order to Trinidad society and greatly improved the public infrastructure, especially in Port of Spain. At the same time, he institutionalised class and racial divisions and was not in favour of emancipation. His governorship was cut short by his death at sea.

== Early life ==
Ralph James Woodford, born in 1784, was the son of the 1st Baronet of Carleby, the diplomat Sir Ralph Woodford, and Gertrude Reessen, of Dutch extraction.

Between 1809 and 1811 Woodford was in Madeira, caring for his invalid sister, Elizabeth. Their parents both died in 1810 and on his return he sought an appointment.

== Governor of Trinidad ==
After declining the offer of the new post of Registrar of Slaves in Trinidad, Woodford secured the governorship of Trinidad under the patronage of Lord Bathurst, then Secretary of State for War and the Colonies. Appointed on 31 October 1812, he succeeded Hector William Munro on 14 June 1813 on his arrival in Port of Spain.

Much of the capital had been destroyed in a major fire in 1808, and under Woodford's direction much of what is now the old centre of Port of Spain was redeveloped. In view of the recent fire, only stone buildings were permitted. Land was reclaimed to provide the first proper wharfage giving access to trading ships. He arranged the purchase of an abandoned sugar estate and laid it out as The Savannah for the people's recreation and as a cattle pasture. Purchasing also the nearby Hollandais Estate as his residence, he also established there botanical gardens and had ornamental trees planted in the town's main squares (including Brunswick Square, renamed Woodford Square in his honour). He had the streets paved, Both of the current cathedrals in Port of Spain have their origins in the churches he had built for the Anglican and Roman Catholic communities. In all, he oversaw the development of Port of Spain into an attractive town; in the words of Henry Coleridge in 1825:

"Port of Spain is by far the finest town I saw in the West Indies. The streets are wide, long, and laid out at right angles; no house is now allowed to be built of wood, and no erection of any sort can be made except in a prescribed line. There is a public walk embowered in trees (...), and a spacious market place with a market house or shambles in excellent order and cleanliness."

Supervising many of the works personally, protected from the sun and on his horse; he became popularly known among the creole as "gouverneur chapeau paille" (Governor straw hat).

In addition to the paving of roads, Woodford introduced steam navigation to link Port of Spain with San Fernando and other settlements around the island. In 1818, the 71-foot wood-hulled Woodford was built by William Denny at Dumbarton, Scotland, and was the first paddle steamer operating in Caribbean waters.

In addition to public works, he was strongly motivated to promote the civic good, not only supporting the development of both the Roman Catholic and Protestant communities, but bringing all schools under Government supervision with a code of "Rules for Schools".

Woodford was personally against the abolition of slavery, and tended to favour the sugar planters with regard to emancipation when disputes came before him. Underlying much of his social policy was a desire to bring order to the newly British colony, but based on a strong class structure. Woodford was particularly concerned about the position of free blacks and whose rights dating back to the period of Spanish control he sought to restrict, for example by seeking to prevent marriages between white and black residents (unlike some of his predecessors, he did not keep a black mistress).

In contrast to his attitude to slaves and free blacks, he was supportive of the indigenous Amerindians and encouraged their ethnic pride and the revival of their festivals, especially around the town of Arima.

== Death ==
In April 1828, Woodford was seriously ill and departed Trinidad for England for treatment. He died en route, off the coast of Jamaica, on 17 May 1828. He did not marry.

== Legacy ==
- Woodford Square in Port of Spain, Trinidad is named in his honour.

Baronetage of Great Britain
Preceded by Ralph Woodford	Baronet (of Carleby); 1810–1828	Extinct
