= Alexander George Woodford =

British Army officer

Field Marshal Sir Alexander Woodford GCB KCMG
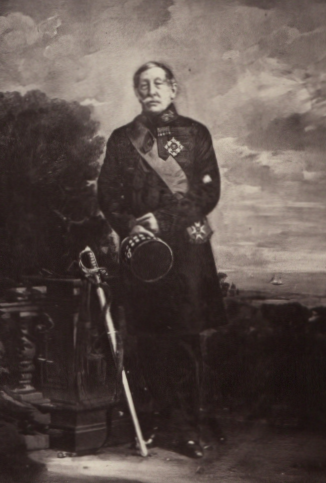
- Sir Alexander Woodford
- Born: 15 June 1782; Welbeck Street, London
- Died: 26 August 1870 (aged 88); Royal Hospital Chelsea, London
- Burial place: Kensal Green Cemetery
- Military career
- Allegiance: United Kingdom
- Branch: British Army
- Service years: 1794–1843
- Rank: Field Marshal
- Commands: 1st battalion Coldstream Guards; 2nd battalion Coldstream Guards
- Conflicts: French Revolutionary Wars; Napoleonic Wars
- Awards: Knight Grand Cross of the Order of the Bath; Knight Commander of the Order of St Michael and St George

Field Marshal Sir Alexander George Woodford, GCB, KCMG (15 June 1782 – 26 August 1870), was a British Army officer. After taking part in the Anglo-Russian invasion of Holland, he served in most of the battles of the Napoleonic Wars. During the Hundred Days he commanded the 2nd battalion of the Coldstream Guards at the Battle of Quatre Bras, the Battle of Waterloo and the storming of Cambrai. He went on to become lieutenant governor and brigade commander at Malta, lieutenant governor and brigade commander at Corfu and then commander of the British garrison on the Ionian Islands before being appointed Governor and Commander-in-Chief of Gibraltar.

== Military career ==
Born at 30 Welbeck Street, London, the son of Lieutenant-Colonel John Woodford and Lady Susan Gordon (daughter of Cosmo Gordon, 3rd Duke of Gordon), Woodford was educated at Winchester College and Royal Military Academy, Woolwich before being commissioned as an ensign in the 9th (East Norfolk) Regiment of Foot on 6 December 1794. He was promoted to lieutenant in the 22nd (the Cheshire) Regiment of Foot on 15 July 1795 and transferred back to the 9th (East Norfolk) Regiment of Foot in September 1799 before seeing action at the Battle of Alkmaar in October 1799 (where he was wounded) during the Anglo-Russian invasion of Holland. Promoted to captain lieutenant on 14 December 1799, he transferred to the Coldstream Guards on 28 December 1799 and became aide-de-camp to Major-General Sir James Forbes in Sicily in 1803. He took part in the Battle of Copenhagen in August 1807 before rejoining Lord Forbes' staff in Sicily in March 1808. After returning London, he was promoted to lieutenant colonel on 8 March 1810.

Woodford was deployed to Spain in early 1811 and, after arriving at Isla de León, he took part in the Siege of Cádiz in March 1811, the Siege of Ciudad Rodrigo in January 1812 and the Siege of Badajoz in March 1812 before also fighting at the Battle of Salamanca in July 1812 and the Siege of Burgos in September 1812 during the Peninsular War. He commanded the 1st battalion of the Coldstream Guards at the Battle of Vitoria in June 1813, the Siege of San Sebastián in August 1813 and the Battle of Nivelle in November 1813 as well as the Battle of the Nive in December 1813 and the Battle of Bayonne in April 1814. He was appointed an aide-de-camp to the Prince Regent with the rank of colonel on 4 June 1814.

During the Hundred Days, Woodford commanded the 2nd battalion of the Coldstream Guards at the Battle of Quatre Bras, the Battle of Waterloo and the storming of Cambrai in June 1815. During the closing stages of the Battle of Waterloo, Woodford fought his way into the Château d'Hougoumont, one of the key landmarks on the battlefield, and then took command of it as the Duke of Wellington ordered a general advance on the French. Woodford was appointed a Companion of the Order of the Bath on 4 June 1815 and a Knight of the Austrian Military Order of Maria Theresa on 2 August 1815. He remained in command of his battalion when it formed part of the Army of Occupation of France.

Promoted to major general on 27 May 1825, Woodford became lieutenant governor and brigade commander at Malta in 1825 and lieutenant governor and brigade commander at Corfu in 1827. Advanced to Knight Commander of the Order of the Bath on 13 September 1831 and appointed a Knight Commander of the Order of St Michael and St George on 30 June 1832, he became commander of the British garrison on the Ionian Islands (where he also briefly served as acting Lord High Commissioner) in 1832. He went on to be Lieutenant-Governor of Gibraltar in February 1835 and Governor and Commander-in-Chief of Gibraltar in September 1836.

Promoted to lieutenant general on 28 June 1838, Woodford retired from active military service in 1843. Advanced to Knight Grand Cross of the Order of the Bath on 6 April 1852 and having been promoted to full general on 20 June 1854, he became Lieutenant-Governor of the Royal Hospital Chelsea in September 1856 and was appointed to a Royal Commission to inquire into the system of Promotion and Retirement in the higher ranks of the Army in May 1863. Promoted to field marshal on 1 January 1868, he was raised to the office of Governor of the Royal Hospital Chelsea in August 1868. He also served as colonel of the 40th Regiment of Foot and then as colonel of the Scots Fusilier Guards. He died at the governor's residence at the Royal Chelsea Hospital on 26 August 1870 and was buried at Kensal Green Cemetery.

== Family ==
Woodford's father was descended maternally from Ralph Brideoake, a 17th-century clergyman who became Dean of Salisbury.

In 1820 Woodford married Charlotte Mary Ann Fraser; they had two sons one of whom, Charles John Woodford, was killed at the Siege of Cawnpore during the Indian Mutiny and is commemorated by a memorial stone in the floor of the north transept of Westminster Abbey.

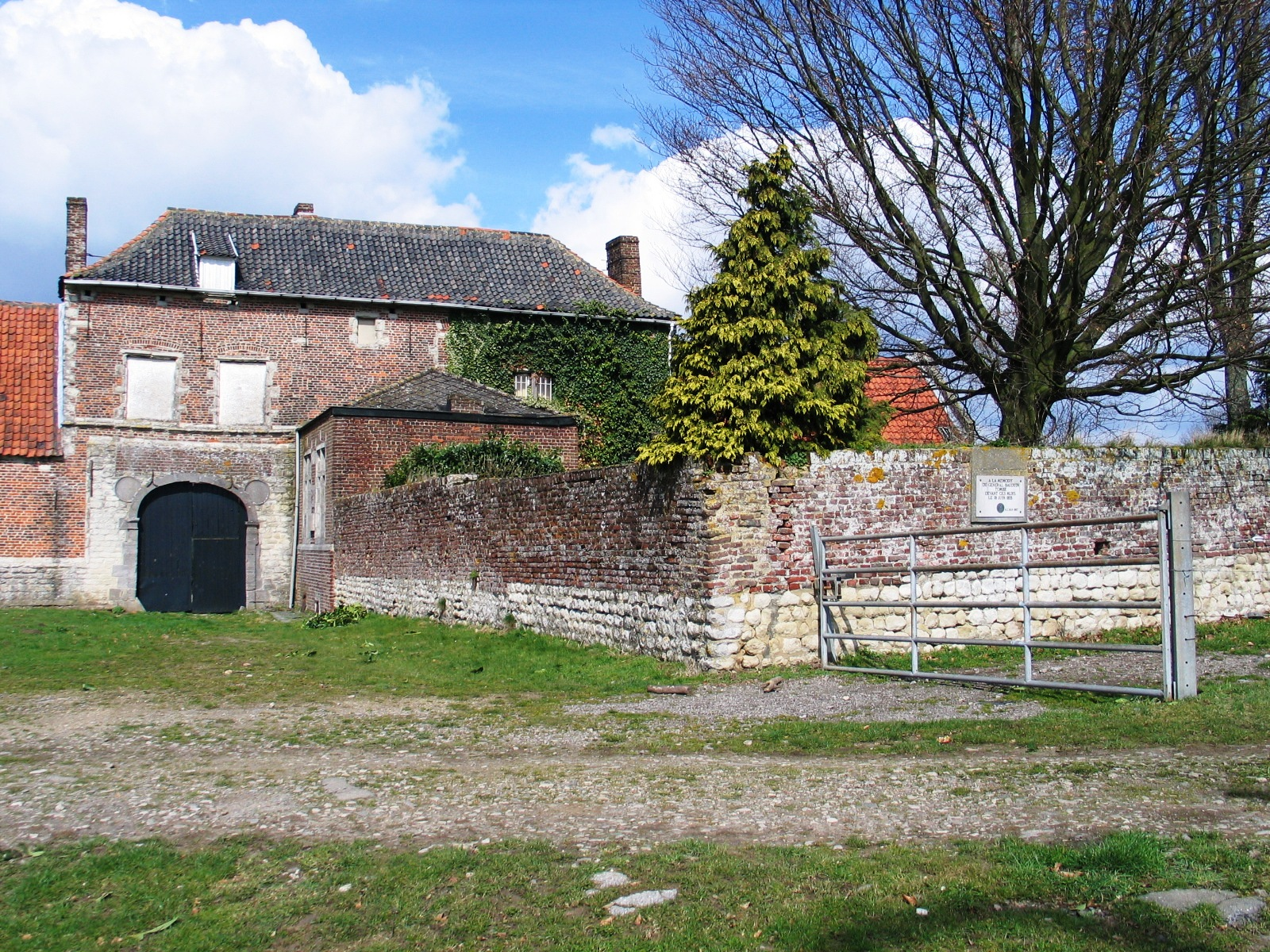
The Château d'Hougoumont held by Woodford during the closing stages of the Battle of Waterloo

The elder son, the Reverend Adolphus Frederick Alexander Woodford, left the Coldstream Guards for a career in the Anglican Church, later becoming a prominent historian of Freemasonry.

Woodford also had a younger brother, John George Woodford (1785–1879), who enjoyed a similarly respectable military career. During this career, he fought in numerous battles in the Napoleonic Wars, including Waterloo, where some sources (Medieval Dead with Tim Sutherland) state that he was the last living British officer to have served at the battle upon his death. He also contributed a large part to military reform in the nineteenth century, particularly such acts as the abolishment of the purchase of commissions and certain punishment methods. He is also noted for the archaeological excavations that he carried out at the supposed battle-field site of Azincourt. His brother died at the age of ninety-four in Keswick in 1879.

== Sources ==
- Heathcote, Tony (1999). The British Field Marshals, 1736–1997: A Biographical Dictionary. Barnsley: Leo Cooper. ISBN 0-85052-696-5.

Military offices
Preceded by Sir Lionel Smith, Bt	Colonel of the 40th Regiment of Foot; 1842–1861	Succeeded by Richard Greaves
Preceded by The Duke of Cambridge	Colonel of the Scots Fusilier Guards; 1861–1870	Succeeded by Sir John Aitchison
Government offices
Preceded by Sir Frederick Adam	Lord High Commissioner of the Ionian Islands (acting); 1832	Succeeded by The Lord Nugent
Preceded by Sir William Houston, Bt	Governor of Gibraltar; 1836–1842	Succeeded by Sir Robert Wilson
Honorary titles
Preceded by Sir Edward Blakeney	Governor, Royal Hospital Chelsea; 1868–1870	Succeeded by Sir John Pennefather
