= Castle Cary =

Town and civil parish in Somerset, England

Coordinates: 51°05′20″N 2°30′57″W

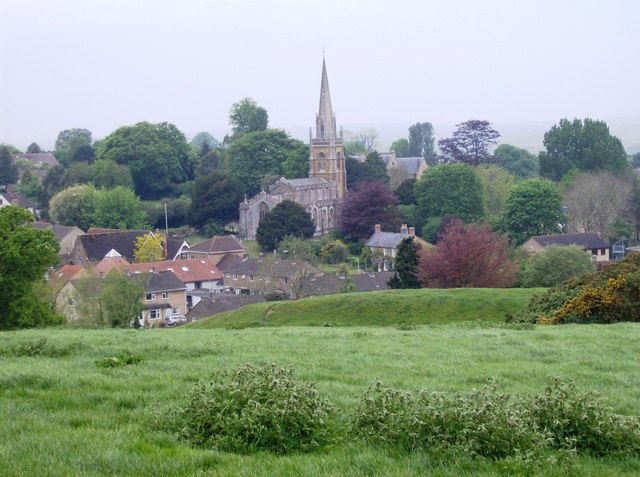
- In the foreground, the motte and bailey of the old castle. Behind is All Saints church

- Location within Somerset
- Population: 2,276 (2011)
- OS grid reference: ST641322
- Unitary authority: Somerset Council
- Ceremonial county: Somerset
- Region: South West
- Country: England
- Sovereign state: United Kingdom
- Post town: CASTLE CARY
- Postcode district: BA7
- Dialling code: 01963
- Police: Avon and Somerset
- Fire: Devon and Somerset
- Ambulance: South Western
- UK Parliament: Glastonbury and Somerton

Castle Cary (/ˌkɑːsəl ˈkɛəri/) is a market town and civil parish in south Somerset, England, 5 miles (8 km) north west of Wincanton and 8 miles (12.9 km) south of Shepton Mallet, at the foot of Lodge Hill and on the River Cary, a tributary of the Parrett.

== History ==
According to The Concise Oxford dictionary of English Place-Names Castle Cary derives its name from the River Cary. The river's name may itself be related to the Welsh word car- meaning "to love"; the name River Cary may mean "pleasant stream".

The first Cary Castle was besieged in 1138 and again in 1152. It was originally made with a timber frame, as it would have been built by the Normans, and inherited their building traditions in wood. Cary first appears in recorded history after the Norman Conquest in 1066, though according to a Castle Cary history there is evidence the site was occupied and fortified before this.

The castle was abandoned and slighted in the 12th century. It was replaced by a manor house, and the stones pillaged for other buildings in the town.

It would seem that the second castle was begun in the 13th century around 1250 and built in Cary stone, indicating that the Hadspen Quarry was in operation at this time. It suggests the Church of All Saints, Castle Cary was begun at a similar time and completed over centuries.

== Castle Cary Manor ==
Castle Cary Manor was given to the Lovels by King Stephen of Blois, who reigned from 22 December 1135 to 25 October 1154 (18 years 308 days). The castle was besieged by King Stephen of Blois in 1138 in his struggle for the throne of England with his cousin Matilda. When the Lovels failed to produce a male heir during the reign of King Edward III, it passed through marriage to Nicholas de S. Maure, a Baron. It passed again through female heir during the time of King Henry V to the Lord Zouches of Harringworth. King Henry VII attainting John Lord Zouch gave the Castle to Robert Willoughby Lord Brook and Lord Zouch's lands at Bridge-water to Lord Daubney. The Zouches had backed King Richard III, the wrong side of the struggle between Richard III and the Tudors.

Castle Cary was granted a formal market charter in 1468 from Edward V. It developed as a market town with a number of rural industries, wool flourishing. The Greene King George Hotel is said to have been constructed around this time, rebuilt after a fire and the Market House from Cary stone 150 years later, 1616. Cary flourished in the 16th century, as indicated by its muster roll when threatened by Spanish invasion late in the century. By 1700 Castle Cary was known for its cloth production, when linen weaving replaced wool at the end of the century. In 1837 John Boyd began making horse-hair textiles, for which he is still renowned today and produces on the original 1870 looms. The diary of Reverend James Woodforde born in Ansford in 1740 provides an insight into 18th century life in the Parish.

The manor was bought in the 1780s by the Hoares of Stourhead in Wiltshire. In 1785 Henry Hobhouse Esquire purchased Hadspen and Hadspen House as the Hobhouse family seat. In the 18th century Castle Cary changed. The Donnes established flax mills making twine, sail cloth, webbing still situated today in the 1877 Florida House. In 1837 the Cricket Club was founded winning the first and only Olympic medal in 1900, though the possibility of it being contested at the Olympics again has resurfaced. The Market House was rebuilt in 1855 in anticipation of increased trade influenced by the railway station. Today the Castle Cary station today is known as the main station to the Glastonbury Festival. In recent years the town has expanded northwards the centre changing little.

Its change starting in the late 18th century was due to the investments of the Hoares and the purchase of Hadpsen and Hadpsen House by Henry Hobhouse, once part of Castle Cary Manor. Henry Hobhouse made significant investments in Castle Cary Manor. Castle Cary now comprises a significant part of Hadspen.

On 19 June 2004, Castle Cary was granted Fairtrade Village status.

== Governance ==
The town is in the Castle Cary electoral division, which elects two councillors to Somerset Council. The electoral division is much larger than the town itself, including several neighbouring parishes to the southwest of the town. Castle Cary also has a Town Council with responsibility for some local issues.

The town was formerly part of South Somerset district from 1974 to 2023, and part of Wincanton Rural District from 1894 to 1974.

It is also part of the Glastonbury and Somerton constituency represented in the House of Commons.

== Transport ==
Castle Cary railway station is on the main Reading to Taunton line and the Heart of Wessex line. It is about 1 mile (1.6 km) north of the town. Every year around the time of the summer solstice this railway station is used by thousands of festival goers who travel to nearby Worthy Farm for the Glastonbury Festival (about 7 miles from Glastonbury) – a parade of free buses and coaches take ticket holders to and from the festival site.

Bus services operate from the town to Yeovil, Shepton Mallet, Street and Wincanton.

The town is on the Monarch's Way long-distance footpath.

== Media ==
Local news and television programmes are provided by BBC West and ITV West Country. Television signals are received from Mendip transmitting station. Local radio stations are BBC Radio Somerset, Heart West, Greatest Hits Radio South West, and Radio Ninesprings, a community based station which broadcast to the town. The town is served by the local newspaper, Western Gazette which publishes Thursdays.

== Landmarks ==
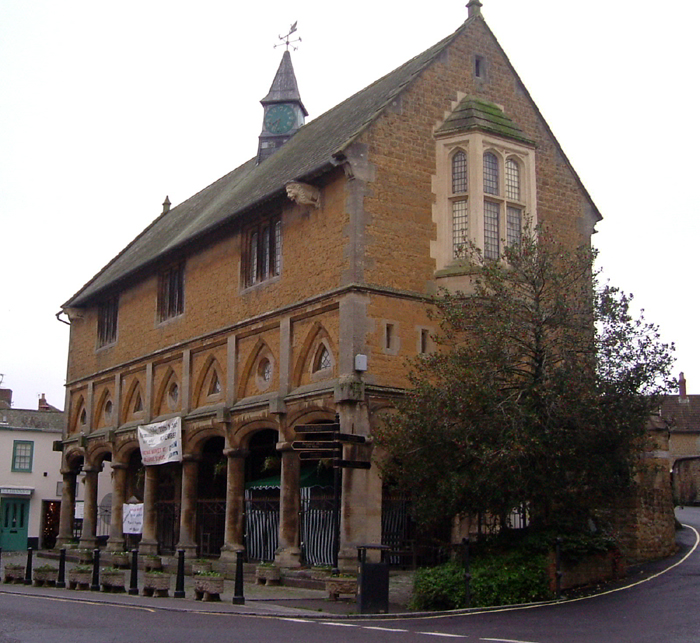
The Market House

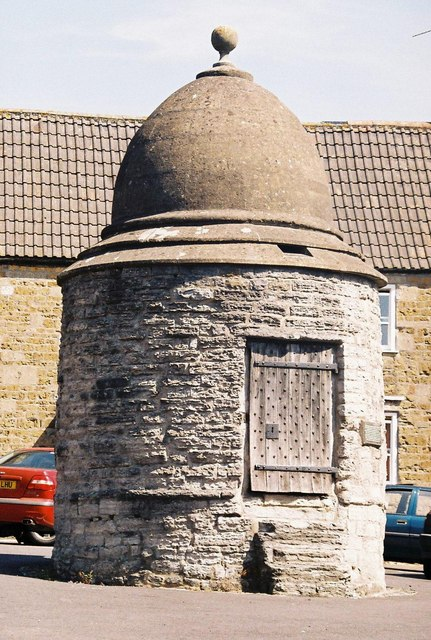
The Roundhouse

Attractions in Castle Cary include a small circular eighteenth-century prison called the roundhouse. This is a temporary prison, or village lock-up. It was built in 1779 by Mr WM Clark for £23, from money left to the poor of Castle Cary in 1605. The structure is circular, stone and has a domed roof. It is 7 feet (2.1 m) in diameter and 10 feet (3.0 m) high with two iron grills for ventilation. The building has an inner and outer door. The interior of the building has a single stone privy. In 1992, the Lord of the Manor, Sir Henry Hoare Bt., gave the building to the parish council.

The Market House is a grade II* listed building built in 1855 in anticipation of increased trade after the projected arrival of the railway in 1856, to a design by Francis Penrose. It replaced the former house on the site which had stood since 1616, and incorporating some features from the earlier building. The market house contains the local Castle Cary and District Museum. There is a varied collection of exhibits spread over the two floors of the building. The earliest are local fossils including ammonites and a display about the discovery of an ichthyosaurus at Alford. Local industry and agriculture are represented with displays on the production of rope and hemp and a collection of agricultural implements, tools and relics. A room is dedicated to the life and work of Parson James Woodforde who was born at the Parsonage in nearby Ansford in 1740. He was later curate at Thurloxton before moving to Norfolk. For nearly 45 years he kept a diary recording an existence the very ordinariness of which provides a unique insight into the everyday routines and concerns of 18th century rural England.

Hadspen House is Grade II* Listed manor house outside the town. The original farmhouse was built by William Player between 1687 and 1689; the Hobhouse family acquired the house in 1785, The gardens were restored by the garden writer and designer Penelope Hobhouse in the late 1960s.and owned by the Hobhouse family it until its sale in 2013 when it was sold to Karen Roos and Koos Bekker. They converted the house into a luxury hotel and the grounds into the attraction, The Newt in Somerset, which opened in 2019.

The Grade II* listed Top Mill Building at Higher Flax Mills which was built in the 19th century is on the Heritage at Risk Register.

== Religious sites ==
The largest church in the town is All Saints', which dates from 1470 and is notable for its high steeple, which contains six bells dating from 1760 and made by Thomas Bilbie of the Bilbie family. It has been designated by English Heritage as a Grade II* listed building. The Cosenes monument in the churchyard, which dates from the 16th century, is on the Heritage at Risk Register.

There is also a Methodist church and St Andrew's in the neighbouring parish of Ansford.

== Notable residents ==
Notable people from the town include:

- James Woodforde (1740–1803), the 18th-century diarist who was curate between 1765 and 1775
- Douglas Macmillan (1884–1969), founder of the Macmillan Cancer Relief charity. The Macmillan Way walking trail passes through the town
- Jane Wallas Penfold (1820–1884), author of Madeira: Flowers, Fruits and Ferns (1845)
- Herbert Pitman (1877–1961), third officer of RMS Titanic, lived in Castle Cary during his career
- Hermione Hobhouse (1934–2014), architectural historian and prominent preservation campaigner, born in Castle Cary

== Education ==
The town has a primary and a secondary school. Castle Cary Community Primary School dates from 1840, whereas Ansford Academy built in 1940 with additional rooms for science, technology, mathematics and modern languages being added in the 1970s. A new £1.7 million Sports Centre was completed in 2005.

== Twin towns – sister cities ==
Castle Cary is twinned with:

- Rémalard en Perche, France, since 1984
