= Thurloxton =

Coordinates: 51.069°N 3.036°W

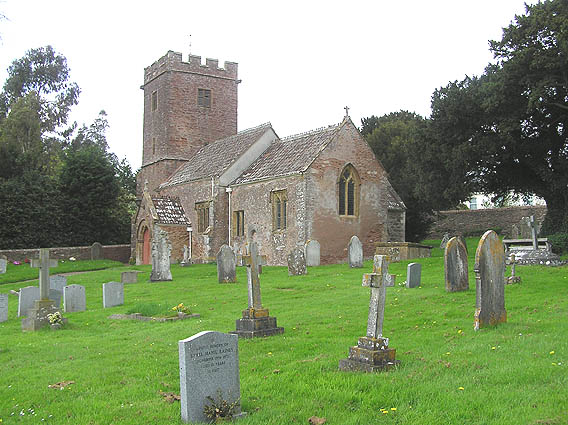
- St Giles church

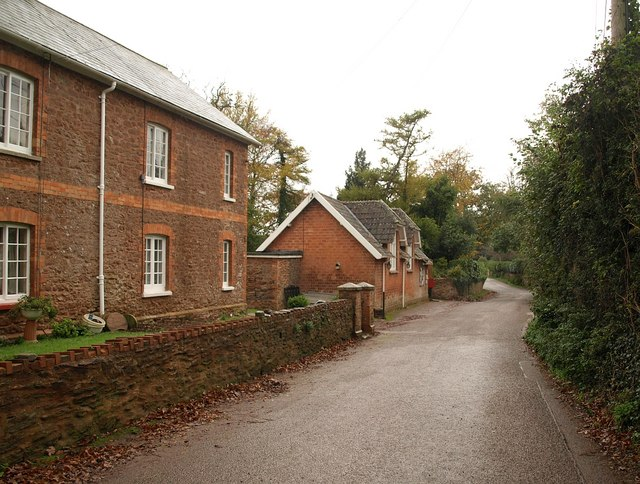
- Buildings in Thurloxton

- Location within Somerset
- Population: 153 (2011)
- OS grid reference: ST275305
- Unitary authority: Somerset Council
- Ceremonial county: Somerset
- Region: South West
- Country: England
- Sovereign state: United Kingdom
- Post town: Taunton
- Postcode district: TA2
- Dialling code: 01823
- Police: Avon and Somerset
- Fire: Devon and Somerset
- Ambulance: South Western
- UK Parliament: Bridgwater

Thurloxton is a village and civil parish 5 miles (8 km) north-east of Taunton, and 5 miles south-west of Bridgwater on the south-eastern slopes of the Quantock Hills in the county of Somerset, England.

== History ==
The name means 'Through the animal pen' from the Old English purh and locian, or alternatively "Thurlac's tun", the holding of the original Saxon owner Thurlac.

The manor and church were held by the monks of Taunton Priory until the dissolution of the monasteries and after that by the Portmans of Orchard Portman.

== Governance ==
The parish council has responsibility for local issues, including setting an annual precept (local rate) to cover the council’s operating costs and producing annual accounts for public scrutiny. The parish council evaluates local planning applications and works with the local police, district council officers, and neighbourhood watch groups on matters of crime, security and traffic. The parish council's role also includes initiating projects for the maintenance and repair of parish facilities, as well as consulting with the district council on the maintenance, repair, and improvement of highways, drainage, footpaths, public transport and street cleaning. Conservation matters (including trees and listed buildings) and environmental issues are also the responsibility of the council.

For local government purposes, since 1 April 2023, the village comes under the unitary authority of Somerset Council. Prior to this, it was part of the non-metropolitan district of Sedgemoor, which was formed on 1 April 1974 under the Local Government Act 1972, having previously been part of Bridgwater Rural District.

It is also part of the Bridgwater county constituency represented in the House of Commons of the Parliament of the United Kingdom. It elects one Member of Parliament (MP) by the first-past-the-post system of election.

== Religious sites ==
The originally Norman Church of St Giles dates from the 14th century but is predominantly from the 15th century with 19th-century restoration including the addition of the north aisle in 1868. It has been designated by English Heritage as a Grade II* listed building. From October 1763 to January 1764 the vicar was the diarist James Woodforde. He was followed by the Rev William Boone. who was curate of the parish for 43 years, but was outlasted by his rector, the Rev Charles Russell, who was appointed in 1768 and held the living for 65 years.
