= James Woodforde =

English diarist and cleric (1740–1803)

The Reverend James Woodforde
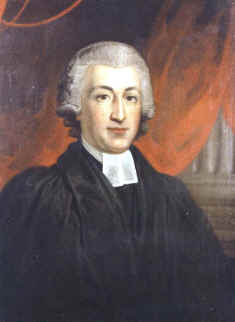
- James Woodforde by his nephew Samuel Woodforde
- Born: 27 June 1740; Ansford, Somerset
- Died: 1 January 1803 (aged 62); Weston Longville, Norfolk
- Education: Winchester College; Oriel & New College, Oxford
- Occupation: Clergyman
- Known for: Diarist
- Parent(s): Revd Samuel and Jane Woodforde

James Woodforde (27 June 1740 – 1 January 1803) was an English clergyman, mainly in Somerset and Norfolk, remembered as the author of The Diary of a Country Parson. This vivid account of parish life remained unpublished until the 20th century.

== Early life ==
James Woodforde was born at the Parsonage, Ansford, Somerset, England on 27 June 1740. In adulthood he led an uneventful, unambitious life as a clergyman of the Church of England: a life unremarkable except that for nearly 45 years, he kept a diary recording the everyday routines and concerns of 18th-century rural England.

A descendant of the noted 17th-century diarist, Robert Woodford of Northampton, he was the sixth child of the Reverend Samuel Woodforde, rector of Ansford and vicar of Castle Cary, and his wife Jane Collins. James was one of four brothers (one of whom died in infancy) and the only one to attend public school – Winchester College, and university – Oxford. He was admitted to Winchester as a scholar in 1752 and enrolled at Oriel College, Oxford in 1758, migrating to New College in the following year. His diary begins with the entry for 21 July 1759: "Made a Scholar of New College".

Woodforde was ordained and graduated BA in 1763, became MA in 1767 and BD in 1775. He appears to have been a competent but uninspired student, and the portrait he provides of Oxford during his two periods of residence as scholar and fellow (1758–1763 and 1773–1776) only confirm Edward Gibbon's famously damning opinion that it was a place where the dons' "dull and deep potations excuse the brisk intemperance of youth". The diary is a rich source of information on university life in 18th-century Oxford.

== Career ==
Upon leaving the university in 1763, Woodforde returned to Somerset where he worked as a curate, mostly for his father, for ten years. From October 1763 to January 1764 he was the curate at Thurloxton. This period of his life, under-represented in Beresford's abridged edition of the Diary, is thickly peopled with memorable characters from all strata of society, many of them immortalised with nicknames – Peter 'Cherry Ripe' Coles, 'Mumper' Clarke, 'Riddle' Tucker. The extended Woodforde family, including James's frequently drunken brothers, figure prominently in these Somerset years.

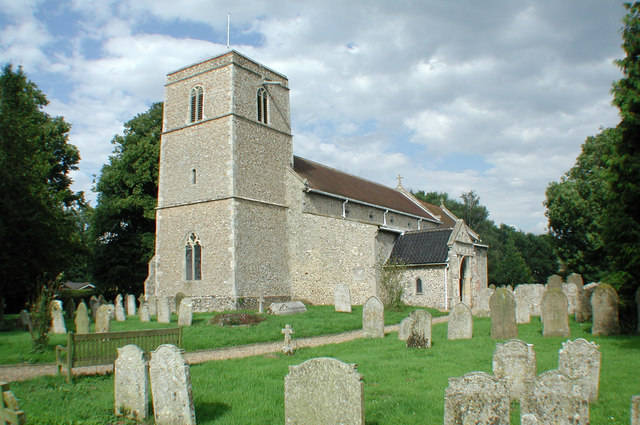
All Saints' Church, Weston Longville in 2001

On his father's death in 1771, James failed to succeed to his parishes, and likewise failed to win, or rather retain, the heart of Betsy White – "a mere Jilt". He returned to Oxford where he became sub-warden of his college and a pro-proctor of the university. He was unsuccessful in his application to become headmaster of Bedford School, but in 1774, he was presented to the living of Weston Longville in Norfolk, one of the best in the gift of the college, being worth £400 a year. He took up residence at Weston in May 1776.

Despite the wrench of leaving family and friends, he quickly settled down to a comfortable bachelor existence. He thought Norwich "the fairest City in England by far" and always enjoyed a trip to the "sweet beach" at Yarmouth. He was soon joined by his niece Nancy Woodforde as housekeeper and companion, who stayed with him until he died. She also was a diarist and correspondent.

In Norfolk, his social life was more limited, but he enjoyed the fellowship of the local clergy who took it in turns to entertain one another to dinner – "our Rotation Club". Because he always recorded what was provided for dinner, which very occasionally was an elaborate banquet, he is often wrongly characterised as a glutton. Among the gentry in the 18th century, it was a matter of pride to provide a variety of dishes. Because Woodforde recorded them all, does not mean that he ate from them all.

Allegedly advised to do so by his father, Woodforde also provides a meticulous record of his accounts. The daily entries are also accompanied by weather notes. The diary provides an account of the small community in which the diarist lived – of the births and deaths, comings and goings, illnesses and annual celebrations.

The diary not only covers "the Squire and his Relations", but also the rector's servants, the farmers and labourers, carpenter and innkeeper, parish clerk and many others. As a churchman, Woodforde himself was conscientious by the standards of his time, charitable and pious without being sanctimonious and again typical of his day, deeply suspicious of enthusiasm.

The value of the diary to the historian lies in the wealth of primary source material it provides, while the general reader can bring from it the authentic flavour of 18th-century English country life. A display about his life and writings is available in the Castle Cary and District Museum in Somerset.

== Writings ==
The Revd James Woodforde was one of several Woodforde diarists. His niece Nancy, and his nephew Bill's three daughters all kept diaries, as did a number of his predecessors, for instance his great-great-grandfather Robert Woodford of Northampton (1606–1654).

The diaries, along with sermons and other papers, were deposited in the Bodleian Library, Oxford in the mid-twentieth century.

The five-volume edition of the diary has one flaw: it is only a selection, and, unaware of how popular it would prove — with Virginia Woolf, Max Beerbohm and Siegfried Sassoon among many thousands more – Beresford selected his first volume from nearly half of the entire Diary. The subsequent volumes, each covering between four and six years, are more complete. A definitive edition has been published by the Parson Woodforde Society.

Whilst Woodforde's sermon style has been described by a leading authority as "formal, competent, thorough and scholarly with a wide vocabulary", his diary-writing style is simple, straightforward, informal and even homely. The following extracts give something of their flavour:

11 Jan. 1763 – Went on the River again this Morning a skating, and I have improved in the out Stroke a good deal, I was on the Ice from 12 this Morning, 'till 5 this Afternoon; and I gave a Fellow for putting on my Skates, and sometimes altering then – 0 : 0 : 2.

13 Nov. 1769 – We had News this Morning of Mr Wilkes gaining his Point against Lord Halifax and 400 Pounds Damages given him. Cary & Ansford Bells rung most part of the Day on the Occasion.

14 April 1775 – We breakfasted, dined, suppd & slept at Norwich. We took a Walk over the city in the morning & we both agreed it was the fairest City in England by far.

1 Jan. 1779 – This morning very early about 1. o'clock a most dreadful Storm of Wind with Hail & Snow happened here and the Wind did not quite abait till the Evening. – A little before 2. o'clock I got up, my bedstead rocking under me, and never in my Life that I know of, did I remember the Wind so high or of so long continuance – I expected every Moment that some Part or other of my House must have been blown down, but blessed be God the whole stood, only a few Tiles displaced... My Chancel received great Damage as did my Barn – the Leads from my Chancel were almost all blown up with some Parts of the Roof – the North West Window blown in & smashed all to pieces.

25 Dec. 1786 – It being Christmas Day, I had the following old men dine at my House on roast beef & plumb Pudding and after Dinner half a Pint of strong ale and a shilling to each to carry home to their Wives – Richd Buck, Thos Cushing, Thos Cary, Thos Carr, Nathaniel Heavers, John Buckman, and my Clerk J^{s} Smith.

25 Jan. 1795 – We breakfasted, dined &c. again at home. The frost this Morning more severe than Yesterday. It froze the Chamber Pots above Stairs.

== Personal life ==
Woodforde was a Freemason, being initiated in 1774 at the New Inn, Oxford, in the "Lodge of Alfred in the University of Oxford". Although this lodge has not survived, it is recognised as the progenitor of Oxford's two oldest extant masonic lodges, the Alfred Lodge (in the City of Oxford), and the Apollo University Lodge (in the University of Oxford). Woodforde records his initiation in his diaries, but declines to note any detail of the ceremonial.

== Simplified Woodforde family tree ==
This simplified tree is meant to help the reader of the Diary. It is mainly built up from the Brief Biographies added by D. Hughes at the end of his diary selection.

The artist Samuel Woodforde, one of James Woodforde's nephews, was a member of the Royal Academy.

Simplified Woodforde family tree
- Samuel Woodforde, divine, poet and founding member of the Royal Society (1636–1701) + Alice Beale (? – 1664)
  - Heighes Woodforde, rector of Epsom (Surrey) (1664–1724) + Mary Lamport, heiress to an estate in Sussex (? – 1742)
    - Anne Woodforde, paid companion of the Countess of Derby, unmarr. (1691–1773)
    - Samuel Woodforde, rector of Ansford and vicar of Castle Cary (Somerset) (1695–1771) +(1724)+ Jane Collins (1706–1766)
      - Sobieski Woodforde ("Sister Clarke") (1725–1821) + Richard Clarke ("Dr Clarke"), physician and inoculator (? – 1785)
        - Jane Clarke ("Jenny") (1754–1836) + Francis Woodforde ("Frank"), rector of Ansford (Somerset) (1748 – ?)
          - descent of Francis Woodforde
        - Samuel Clarke (“Sam”), kleptomaniac (1756 – ?)
        - Anna Maria Clarke (“Nanny”), mental invalid (1759–1794)
        - Sophia Clarke (“Sophy”), eloped with her cousin (1761–1839) +(1780)+ Robert White (? – 1831)
          - 10 children
      - Heighes Woodforde, attorney, often short of money, heir to the Sussex estate (1726–1789) +(1754)+ Ann Dorville (1734–1799)
        - Anna Maria Woodforde ("Nancy"), companion of JW at Weston Longville (Norfolk) (1757–1830)
        - William Woodforde ("Bill"), Navy officer (1758–1844) +(1788)+ Anne Dukes of Galhampton (Somerset) (1771–1829)
          - issue
        - Juliana Woodforde, died of tuberculosis (1760–1788)
        - Samuel Woodforde, artist, Royal Academy (1763–1817) +(1815)+ Jane Gardner
      - Mary Woodforde ("Sister White") (1729–1804) + Robert White, uncle of Betsy White, whom JW wished to marry
        - Molly White (1754–1761)
        - John White ("Little Jacky"), invalid, died of an incurable disease (1755–1773)
        - James White, lawyer (1763–1791)
        - Robert White, eloped with his cousin (? – 1831) +(1780)+ Sophia Clarke ("Sophy") (1761–1839)
          - 10 children
        - 3 other children
      - Jane Woodforde ("Jenny", "Sister Pounsett") (1734–1798) +(1774)+ John Pounsett of Cole (Somerset) (1733–1795)
        - Jane Pounsett ("Jenny") (1775–1820) + Frederick Grove, clergyman
      - James Woodforde, diarist, fellow of New College (Oxford), rector of Weston Longville (Norfolk), unmarr. (1740–1803)
      - John Woodforde ("Jack"), ironmonger and debauchee (1744–1799) +(1774)+ Melliora Clarke
    - Elizabeth Woodforde ("Aunt Parr") (1699–1771) + ? Parr
    - John Woodforde, rector of North Curry (Somerset) (1703 – ?) + Rebekah Hamilton
      - Robert Woodforde, apothecary in Bath (Somerset) (1738–1825)
      - Thomas Woodforde, physician in Taunton (Somerset) and bank partner (1743–1828)
    - Thomas Woodforde (“Uncle Tom”) (1706–1800) + Sarah Adams (“Aunt Tom”)
      - Francis Woodforde (“Frank”), rector of Ansford (Somerset) (1748 – ?) + Jane Clarke (“Jenny”) (1754–1836)
        - Frances Woodforde (“Fanny”)
        - Thomas Woodforde (“Tom”)
  - Robert Woodforde ("My uncle at Wells"), canon and treasurer of the Wells cathedral (Somerset) (1675–1762)

A remarkably detailed account of the Woodforde family exists, and is now documented online.

== See also ==
- Mary Hardy (diarist)
- Parson-naturalist

== Sources ==
- Beresford, John (ed.) The Diary of a Country Parson, 5 Vols. 1924–31
- Hughes, D. (ed.), The Diary of a Country Parson: The Revd James Woodforde, 2015, The Folio Society, London.
- Treasure, G. Who's Who in History, Vol. IV 1714–1789, 1969, ISBN 0-631-06190-8
- Winstanley, Roy, Parson Woodforde: the Life and Times of a Country Diarist, 1996, ISBN 0-948903-38-4
- Woodforde, Dorothy Heighes (ed) Woodforde Papers and Diaries, 1932, Peter Davies, London. Reprinted by Parson Woodforde Society, 1990
