= List of alumni of Stellenbosch University =

This is a list of notable alumni and staff of Stellenbosch University.

== Science ==
- James L Barnard, civil engineer and pioneer of biological nutrient removal in wastewater treatment
- Johannes Christiaan de Wet, legal scholar, professor, recognized as South Africa's most influential jurist.
- Friedel Sellschop, physicist and pioneer in the field of Nuclear physics.
- James Leonard Brierley Smith, ichthyologist, organic chemist and university professor. First to identify a taxidermied fish as a coelacanth, at the time thought long extinct.
- Leopoldt van Huyssteen, soil scientist.
- Lulu Latsky, first woman to earn a PhD at Stellenbosch (1930); zoologist and writer.
- Novel Njweipi Chegou, molecular biologist and winner of the Royal Society Africa Prize in 2022.
- Henda Swart, mathematician
- Taryn Young, physician and epidemiologist.

== Law ==
- Fritz Brand, judge of the Supreme Court of Appeal of South Africa.
- Baron Steyn, British Law Lord, Lord of Appeal in Ordinary.
- John Dugard, professor of international law at Leiden University former member of the International Law Commission ad hoc judge of the International Court of Justice.
- Lourens Ackermann, former justice of the Constitutional Court of South Africa.
- Edwin Cameron, Rhodes scholar and justice of the Constitutional Court of South Africa.
- Johan Froneman, lawyer and justice of the Constitutional Court of South Africa.
- Jacob de Villiers, judge, Chief Justice of South Africa from 1929 to 1932.
- Nicolaas Jacobus de Wet, politician, lawyer, and judge. Chief Justice of South Africa and acting Governor-General from 1943 to 1945.
- Henry Allan Fagan, judge, Chief Justice of South Africa from 1957 to 1959.
- Monique Nsanzabaganwa, economist, politician and Deputy Governor of the National Bank of Rwanda.
- Lucas Cornelius Steyn, judge, Chief Justice of South Africa from 1959 to 1971.
- Pieter Jacobus Rabie, judge, Chief Justice of South Africa from 1982 to 1989.
- Barend van Niekerk, lawyer and academic.
- Pierre de Vos, constitutional law scholar.
- Brian Currin, human rights lawyer.
- Billy Downer, public prosecutor.

== Politics ==
- Naledi Pandor, South African Minister of International Relations and Cooperation (South Africa).
- Sandra Botha, former Leader of the Opposition in the National Assembly for the Democratic Alliance (South Africa).
- James Barry Munnik Hertzog, former Prime Minister of the Union of South Africa.
- Magnus André De Merindol Malan, last Minister of defence during the Apartheid era.
- Gerhard Tötemeyer, former Namibian Deputy Minister of Local and Regional Government and Housing.
- Johannes Frederik Janse Van Rensburg, former leader of the Ossewabrandwag.
- Eben Dönges, South African politician who was elected State President of South Africa, but died before he could take office.
- Andries Treurnicht, politician, Minister of Education during the Soweto Riots, founded and led the Conservative Party of South Africa.
- Hendrik Frensch Verwoerd, former apartheid-era Prime Minister of South Africa.
- Balthazar Johannes Vorster, former apartheid-era Prime Minister of South Africa.
- Daniel François Malan, former apartheid-era Prime Minister of South Africa.
- Johannes Gerhardus Strijdom, former apartheid-era Prime Minister of South Africa.
- Frederik van Zyl Slabbert, former opposition politician who became chancellor of Stellenbosch University.
- Jan Smuts, former South African Prime Minister.

== Business ==
- Koos Bekker, businessman, billionaire chairman of Naspers.
- Sir David de Villiers Graaff, 3rd Baronet businessman.
- Markus Jooste, businessman and the former CEO of Steinhoff International.
- Christo Wiese, businessman, former billionaire, chairman of Shoprite (South Africa).
- Jan Steyn, judge and development leader.
- Jannie Mouton, businessman, founder and chairman of PSG Group.
- Mark Patterson, private equity investor and founder of MatlinPatterson Global Advisors
- Jan du Plessis, businessman
- Johann Rupert, businessman and founding trustee of the Nelson Mandela Children's Fund
- Japie van Zyl, deputy director of the Jet Propulsion Laboratory.
- Ntsiki Biyela, winemaker and businesswomen.
- Adii Pienaar, technology entrepreneur and software developer.

== Sport ==
- Stuart Abbott, rugby player.
- Mari Rabie, Rhodes scholar, triathlete.
- Danie Craven, prominent Rugby player and sport administrator.
- Ashley Burdett, Zimbabwean cricketer
- Craig Tiley, CEO of Tennis Australia and Director of the Australian Open.
- Attie van Heerden, Olympian, rugby union, and rugby league footballer.
- Jonathan Trott, England Cricketer.
- Max Howell, Australian educator and rugby union player
- Louis Schreuder, rugby union player

== Arts and music ==
- Etienne Leroux, writer and member of the South African Sestigers literary movement.
- Paul Cilliers, philosopher and complexity theorist.
- Casper de Vries, actor and comedian.
- Abraham H. de Vries, writer.
- Liza Grobler, artist.
- Elsa Joubert, novelist.
- Uys Krige, playwright, poet and translator.
- Cornelis Jacobus Langenhoven, poet who composed words of Afrikaner anthem Die Stem.
- Willim Welsyn, singer, songwriter, guitarist and podcaster.
- Rona Rupert, musician and author of 33 Afrikaans books.
- Johannes du Plessis Scholtz, philologist, art historian and art collector.
- Peet Pienaar, performance artist.
- Cromwell Everson, composer of the first Afrikaans opera.
- Zanne Stapelberg, opera singer.
- Tom Dreyer, novelist and poet writing in both English and Afrikaans.
- Deon van der Walt, opera singer.
- Ernst van Heerden, Afrikaans poet.
- Claudette Schreuders, sculptor and painter
- Karlien de Villiers, artist

== Academia ==
- Mark Nigrini, academic, accounting professor.
- Estian Calitz, economics professor.
- André du Pisani, political scientist and professor at University of Namibia.
- Sampie Terreblanche, former professor of economics at Stellenbosch and founder member of the Democratic Party.
- Hendrik W. (H.W.) van der Merwe founder of the Centre for Intergroup Studies, University of Cape Town.
- Marina Joubert, senior science communication researcher at Stellenbosch University
- Lydia Baumbach, classical scholar
- Gisela Sole, professor of physiotherapy at University of Otago in New Zealand

== Other ==
- Mike Horn, adventurer.
- Alfredo Tjiurimo Hengari, political scientist.
- John Laredo, anti-apartheid campaigner.
- Riaan Cruywagen, newsreader and voice artist.
- Johan Degenaar, philosopher.
- Beyers Naudé, theologian and anti-apartheid activist.
- Siegfried Ngubane, Anglican bishop.
- D. C. S. Oosthuizen, (Daantjie Oosthuizen), philosopher, Christian, critic of Apartheid.
- Vern Poythress, Calvinist philosopher and New Testament scholar.
- Martin Welz, investigative journalist and editor of South African investigative magazine Noseweek.
- Stefanus Gie, diplomat.
- Vuyokazi Mahlati, social entrepreneur, gender activist and global director of the International Women's Forum
- Max du Preez, author, columnist and the founding editor of Vrye Weekblad
