= Stellenbosch University =

University in Western Cape, South Africa

- Universiteit Stellenbosch or Stellenbosch Universiteit
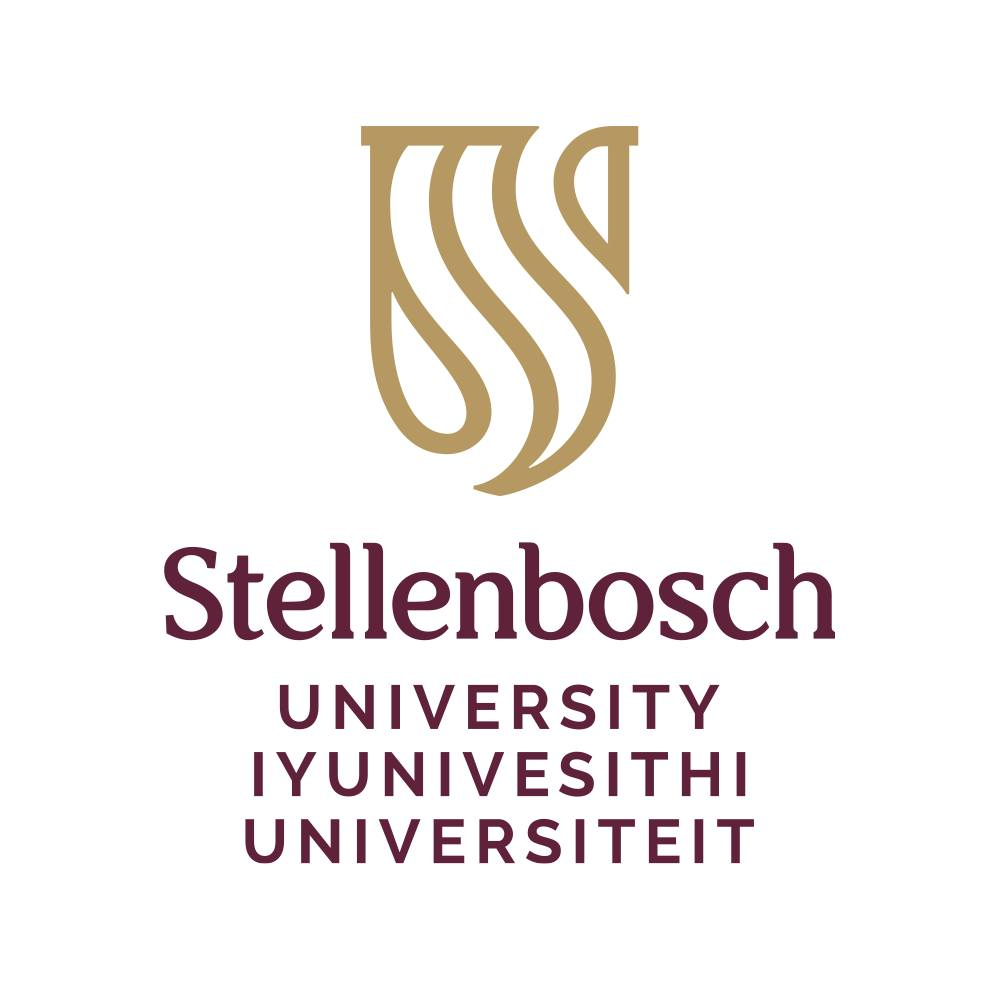
- Motto: Latin: Pectora roborant cultus recti
- Motto in English: "A sound education strengthens the spirit"
- Type: Public university
- Established: 2 April 1918; 108 years ago
- Affiliations: AAU; ACU; CHEC; HESA; IAU
- Endowment: ZAR 5.04 Billion
- Chancellor: Governor Lesetja Kganyago
- Vice-Chancellor: Professor Deresh Ramjugernath
- Academic staff: 1,028
- Administrative staff: 2,183
- Undergraduates: 25,042
- Postgraduates: 10,051
- Location: Stellenbosch, Western Cape, South Africa (SA); 33°55′58″S 18°51′51″E
- Campus: 2 suburban, 2 Urban area and 1 rural
- Colours: Confident Maroon & Brilliant Gold
- Nickname: Maties
- Mascot: Pokkel
- Website: www.su.ac.za

Stellenbosch University (SU) (Afrikaans: Universiteit Stellenbosch, Xhosa: iYunivesithi yaseStellenbosch) is a public research university situated in Stellenbosch, a town in the Western Cape province of South Africa. Stellenbosch University received full university status in 1918 and is known for designing and manufacturing Africa's first microsatellite, SUNSAT, launched in 1999.

Stellenbosch is organised in 139 departments across 10 faculties offering bachelor's (NQF 7) to doctoral degrees (NQF 10) in the English and Afrikaans languages. Across five campuses in the Western Cape, the university is home to 32,000 students.

The students of Stellenbosch University are nicknamed "Maties". Although the source of the term is unknown, it likely arises from the Afrikaans word "tamatie" (meaning tomato, and referring to the maroon sports uniforms and blazer colour). An alternative theory is that the term comes from the Afrikaans colloquialism maat (meaning "buddy" or "mate"), originally used diminutively ("maatjie") by the students of the University of Cape Town's precursor, the South African College.

== History ==
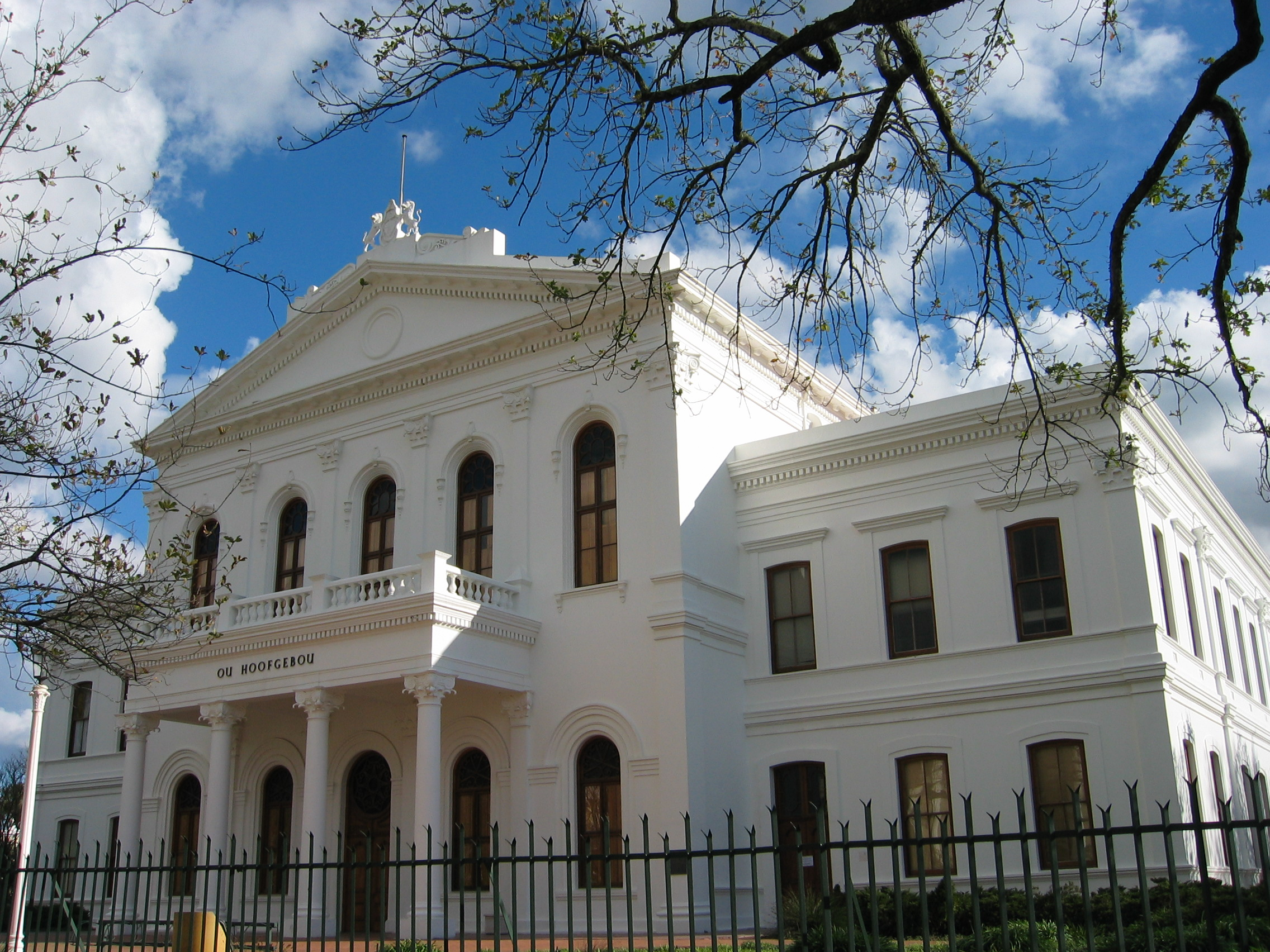
The Ou Hoofgebou (Former Main Administration building, now the Law Faculty) on Stellenbosch University campus

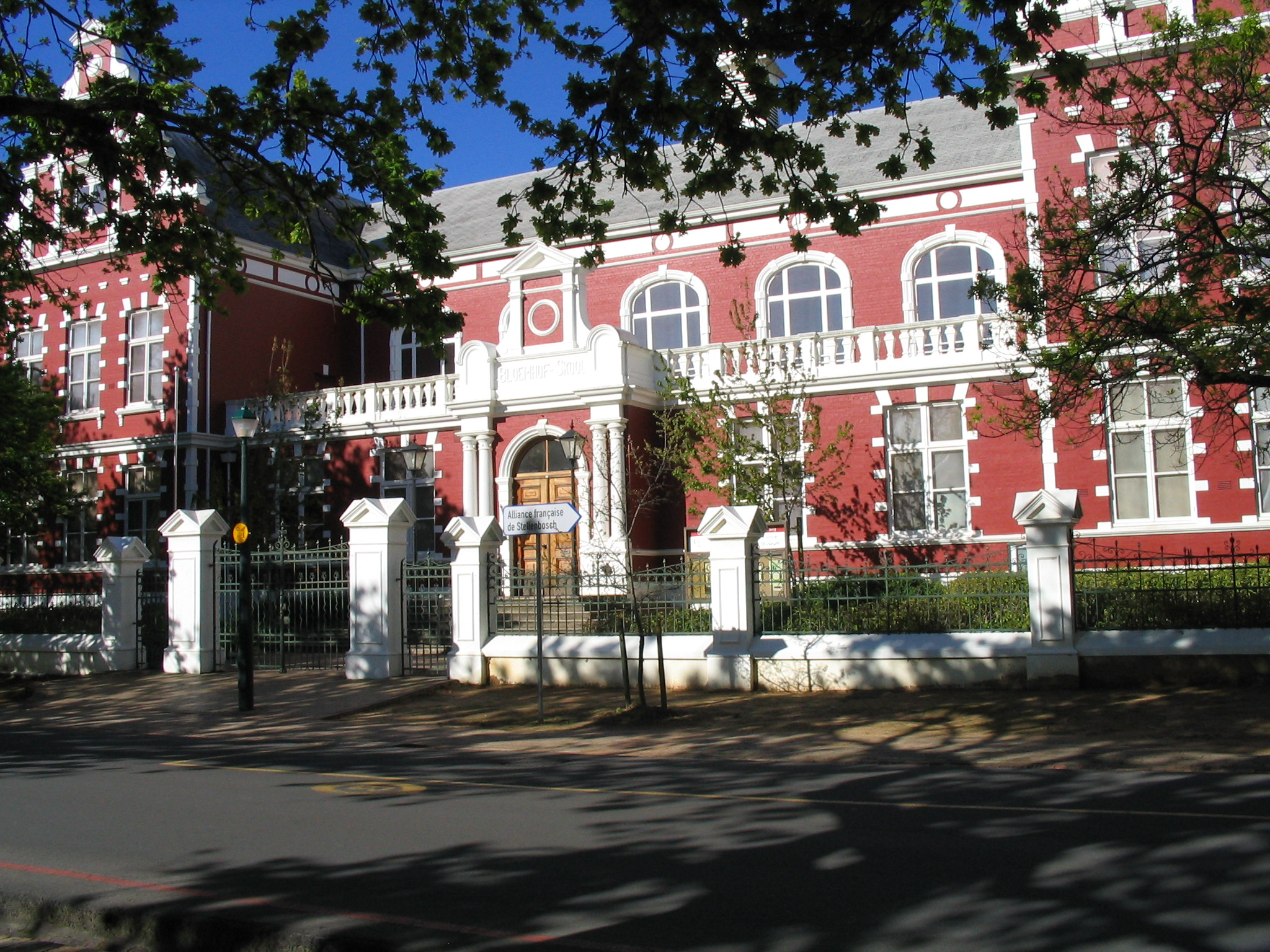
Stellenbosch University Museum

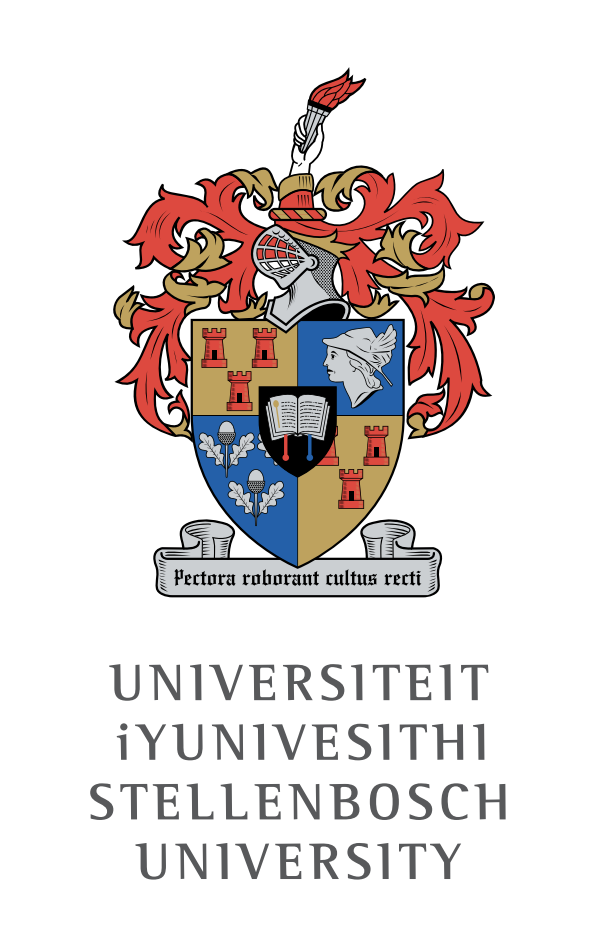
Old emblem, used until 2021, incorporating the coat of arms granted in 1918

The origin of the university can be traced back to the Stellenbosch Gymnasium, which was founded in 1864 and opened on 1 March 1866. The first five students matriculated in 1870, but capacity did not initially exist for any tertiary education. However, in the 1870s, the Cape Colony's first locally elected government took office and prioritised education. In 1873, four of the five 1870 matriculates became the institution's first graduates by attaining the "Second Class Certificate" through distance learning, and the gymnasium's student numbers rose to over a hundred.

In 1874, a series of government acts provided for colleges and universities, with generous subsidies and staff. A personal intervention by the Prime Minister in the same year ensured that Stellenbosch qualified, after initially being allocated to be purely a secondary school. Later in 1874, the institution acquired its first professor and, in the following few years, its capacity and staff grew rapidly. Its first academic senate was constituted at the beginning of 1876, when several new premises were also acquired. The first MA degree (in Stellenbosch and in South Africa) was completed in 1878. That same year, the Gymnasium's first four female students were enrolled.

The institution became the Stellenbosch College in 1881 and was located at the current Arts Department. In 1887, this college was renamed Victoria College; when it acquired university status on 2 April 1918 it was renamed once again, becoming Stellenbosch University. Initially, only one university was planned for the Cape, but after the government was visited by a delegation from the Victoria College, it was decided to allow the college to be a university if it could raise £100,000. Jannie Marais, a wealthy Stellenbosch farmer, bequeathed the money required before his death in 1915. There were certain conditions to his gift, including that Dutch/Afrikaans have equal status to English and that the lecturers teach at least half their lectures in Dutch/Afrikaans. By 1930, very little, if any, instruction was delivered in English.

In December 2014, specialists at the university performed the first successful penis transplantation on a 21-year-old man.

Stellenbosch University was the first African university to sign the Berlin Declaration on Open Access to Knowledge in the Sciences and Humanities.

=== Name ===
Although the university was originally named the University of Stellenbosch (Afrikaans: Universiteit van Stellenbosch), it nowadays uses two forms: the English version Stellenbosch University (abbreviated SU) and the Afrikaans version Universiteit Stellenbosch (abbreviated US).

== Facilities ==
=== Location ===
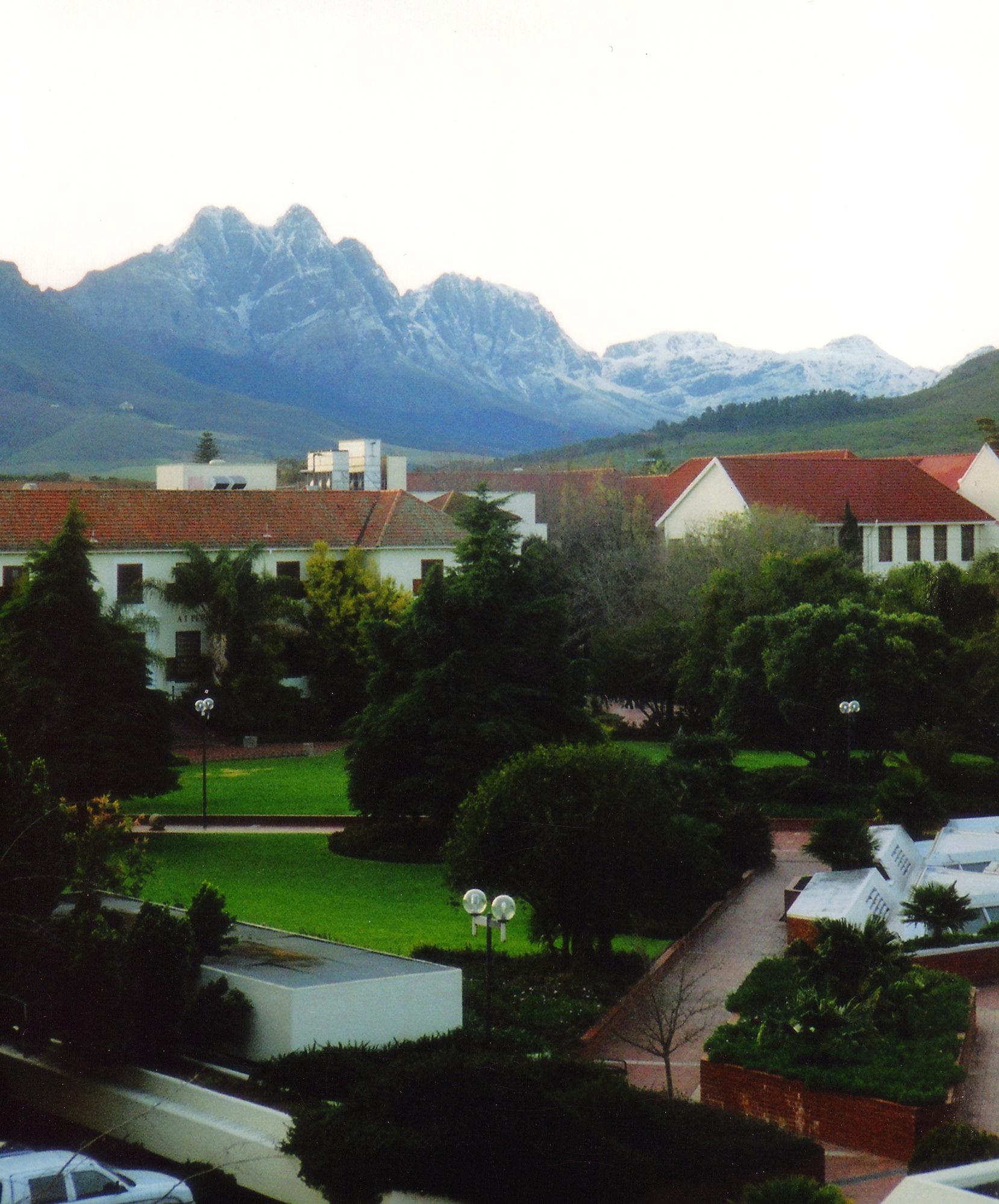
View over the "Red Square" of Stellenbosch University with the peak,"The Twins" beyond

Stellenbosch is located about 50 kilometres from Cape Town, and is situated on the banks of the Eersterivier ("First River") in the famous wine-growing region and is encircled by picturesque mountains. Teaching at Stellenbosch University is divided across five campuses.

- Main campus in Stellenbosch
- Bellville Park Campus (Business School)
- Saldanha Campus (Military Science)
- Tygerberg Campus (Medicine and Health Sciences)
- Ukwanda Rural Clinical (Medicine and Health Sciences)

=== Faculties ===
Stellenbosch University consists of 139 departments across 10 faculties.

- AgriSciences
- Arts and Social Sciences
- Economic and Management Sciences
- Education
- Engineering
- Law
- Medicine and Health Sciences (Tygerberg)
- Military Science (Saldanha Bay)
- Science
- Theology

This decision was connected with South Africa's bid to host the Square Kilometre Array of radio telescopes. In September 2009 Jean-Pierre Ezin, African Union commissioner for science, said the node at the University of Stellenbosch in South Africa was hoped to open in February 2010. According to University World News, however, "The PAU project continues in other regions although Southern Africa has been lagging behind."

=== Sports facilities ===
Stellenbosch University has the facilities for the more than 30 competitive and recreational sports that are supported by the university include Danie Craven Stadium, Indoor and Outdoor Swimming Pools, the Coetzenburg Centre, a multi-purpose center for ceremonies and indoor sports, playing fields, including two artificial hockey fields, a gymnasium, and a new football complex.

=== Sporting codes ===
The university offers several sports to its students. Some of them are athletics, bouldering, badminton, basketball, canoeing, cricket, cross country running, cycling, fencing, golf, gymnastics, field hockey, judo, kendo, netball, rowing, rugby union, soccer, squash, surfing, swimming, taekwondo, tennis, underwater hockey, volleyball, water polo, and yachting.

=== Facilities and services ===
==== Libraries ====
The Stellenbosch University Library has collections scattered around the campus outside of the main facility, and all of which are catalogued on a computerized database, using the university's original mainframe, a UNIVAC. There are several other satellite libraries servicing the different faculties, including the Theology Library, Law Library and Tygerberg Medical Library.

==== University facilities ====
Stellenbosch University also has a Conservatory, with two concert halls. The Conservatory is the home of the internationally acclaimed Stellenbosch University Choir, who, along with being the oldest South African choir have received numerous awards overseas. The university also has a 430-seat theatre, known as the HB Thom Theatre and an open-air amphitheatre. Accompanying these facilities is the university's own Drama Department, under the guidance of the Faculty of Arts and Social Sciences. The department regularly puts on plays, dramas, productions, cabarets and musicals.

==== Botanical garden ====
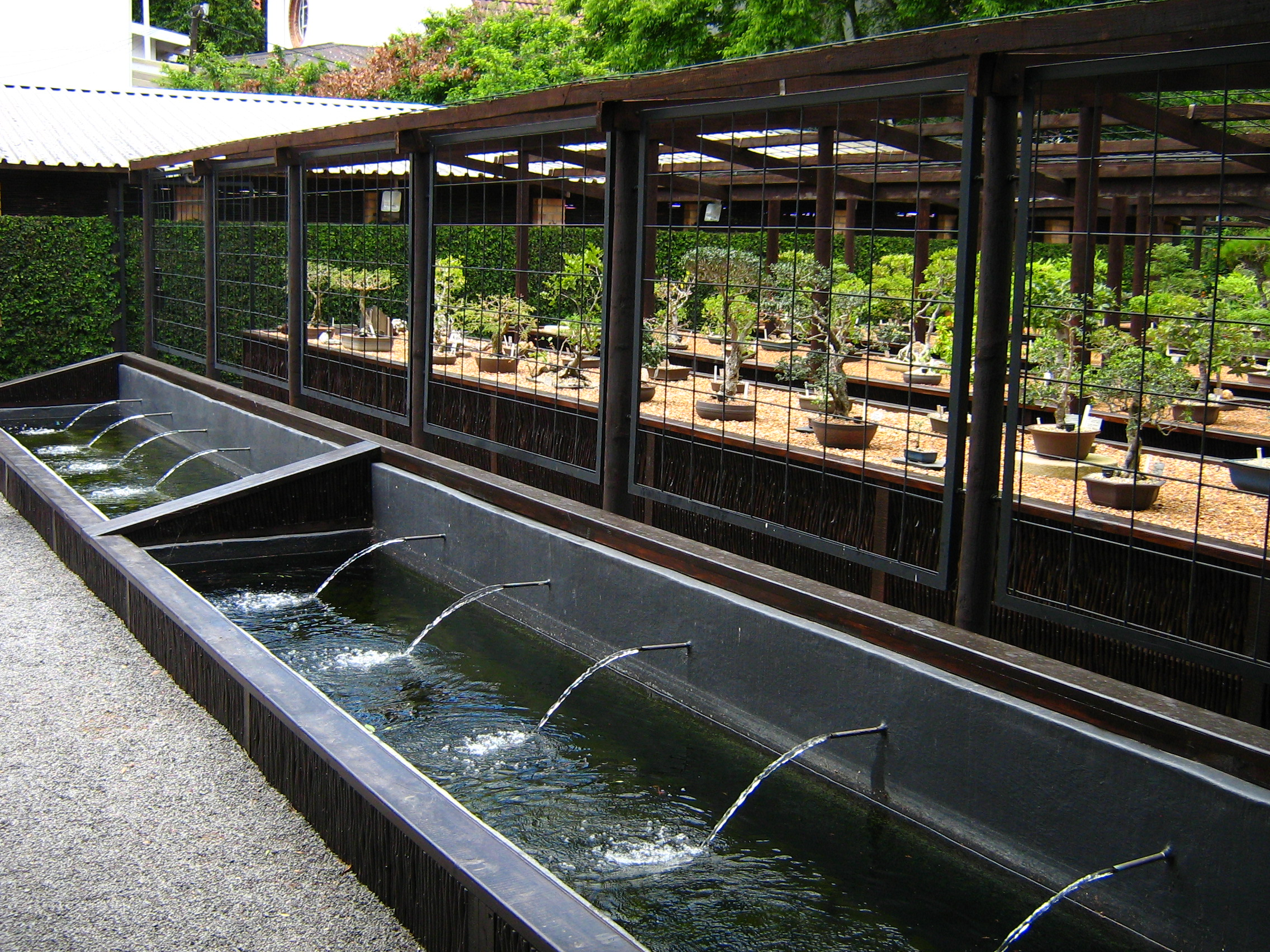
Botanical Garden – Bonsai Collection

The Stellenbosch University Botanical Garden is the oldest university botanical garden in South Africa.

==== Student center ====
The Langenhoven Students' Centre (Neelsie) houses the Student Representative Council, a food court, a cinema, a post office, a shopping centre, an advice office and all the student societies' offices. Student bands and various entertainment and activity promotions usually appear in the main food court during lunch hour.

==== Campus radio ====
The university has its own radio station known as MFM (Matie FM), situated in the Neelsie. It broadcasts a mix of music, news, entertainment and campus news over the entire Stellenbosch area at 92.6 FM.

==== Campus newspaper ====
The university also distributes regular publications, Die Matie (which is editorially independent and appears every fortnight) for its students and Kampusnuus (appearing monthly) for its staff. An official yearbook, Stellenbosch Student, is published annually and presented to all graduating students. Matieland is the name of the official alumni magazine. It is published twice a year and distributed to some 100 000 alumni and friends of the university.

== Language ==
Stellenbosch University has historically been a predominantly Afrikaans-medium university. However, as the student body grew more diverse, demand increased for more classes taught in English. Today, the university's language policy promotes multilingualism as a means to increase equitable access for all students and staff. Afrikaans, English and Xhosa are used in academic, administrative, professional and social contexts, and classes are offered in Afrikaans and English.

In 2021, the university reported that 48.7% of its students stated English as their home language, 37.4% stated Afrikaans, 6.8% stated another of South Africa's official languages, and 7.1% stated an international language as their home language. Between 2017 and 2021, the percentage of undergraduates who preferred English as the language of learning and instruction increased from 68.2% to 80.8%. At postgraduate level, the language of instruction is determined by the composition of the class, provided all students are suitably proficient in the chosen language. Most advanced postgraduate courses are taught in English.

The language policy is an ongoing issue for the university, since it is one of the few South African tertiary institutions offering instruction in Afrikaans. It is situated in the Western Cape province, where 41% of the population state Afrikaans is their home language per the 2022 census, and it is the only one of four universities in the province to offer degree courses in Afrikaans. The university annually hosts the SU Woordfees, a predominantly Afrikaans-language festival of the written and spoken word.

== Student profile ==
Student enrollment by race
Year	White (Number)	White (%)	Black African (Number)	Black African (%)	Coloured (Number)	Coloured (%)	Indian (Number)	Indian (%)	International (Number)	International (%)	Withheld (Number)	Withheld (%)	Total
2015	18,764	62.20%	5,355	17.80%	5,238	17.40%	793	2.63%	—	—	—	—	30,150
2016	18,907	61.30%	5,629	18.20%	5,443	17.60%	875	2.84%	—	—	—	—	30,854
2017	18,937	59.90%	6,018	19.00%	5,718	18.10%	952	3.01%	—	—	—	—	31,625
2018	18,447	58.10%	6,375	20.10%	5,757	18.10%	996	3.14%	—	—	136	0.43%	31,711
2019	17,935	56.60%	5,347	21.00%	5,677	18.10%	1,021	3.20%	—	—	244	0.77%	31,596
2020	17,607	55.50%	6,873	21.80%	5,679	18.00%	1,004	3.20%	—	—	370	1.17%	31,533
2021	16,616	51.50%	5,347	16.58%	5,677	17.60%	1,021	3.17%	3,143	9.74%	383	1.19%	32,447
2022	16,214	49.84%	5,852	18.00%	5,644	17.40%	1,049	3.22%	3,189	9.80%	494	1.52%	32,442
2023	15,933	47.30%	6,597	19.60%	5,646	16.78%	1,128	3.35%	3,644	10.83%	633	1.88%	33,581
2024	16,248	45.94%	7,568	21.40%	5,456	15.43%	1,137	3.21%	3,586	10.14%	1,283	3.63%	35,278
2025	16,188	44.70%	8,447	23.32%	5,342	14.75%	1,153	3.18%	3,529	9.74%	1,466	4.05%	36,125

== Student housing ==
Stellenbosch has 34 residence halls in configurations for women only, men only and mixed gender. Each residence is supervised by a resident head assisted by a House Committee of senior students. The House Committee assists students with security, maintenance, and social programs. Each first year student on campus gets access to a be-well mentor who assist them with their social-emotional transition from school to university. Each residence for undergrads incorporates a laundry room, a common living room and a dining hall where meals are provided for which students book beforehand on their student account.

The number of available rooms in university residences is limited, which requires some students to find private boarding. Students in private lodgings are assigned to one of 6 Commuter Student Organisations (CSO), also known as Private Wards. These CSOs give private students exposure to the same campus experience as students residing in residences. The oldest residence is Wilgenhof men's residence, established in 1903.

The CSO wards along with the Residence Halls are grouped into six clusters with nearby residences to form student communities (a seventh cluster is on the Tygerberg campus). For each of these clusters, a hub facility is being built, of which three have already been completed, namely amaMaties, Wimbledon and Victoria. In this way, commuter students can enjoy the same benefits as residence students, such as mentor support, meals and a well-appointed place to go to between classes.

== Rankings ==
University rankings

Global – Overall
- ARWU World: 401–500 (2023)
- CWUR World: 450
- CWTS World: 461
- QS World: 302 (2026)
- THE World: 301–350 (2024)
- USNWR Global: 304
- URAP World: 362

Regional – Overall
- QS BRICS: 51
- THE Africa: 2

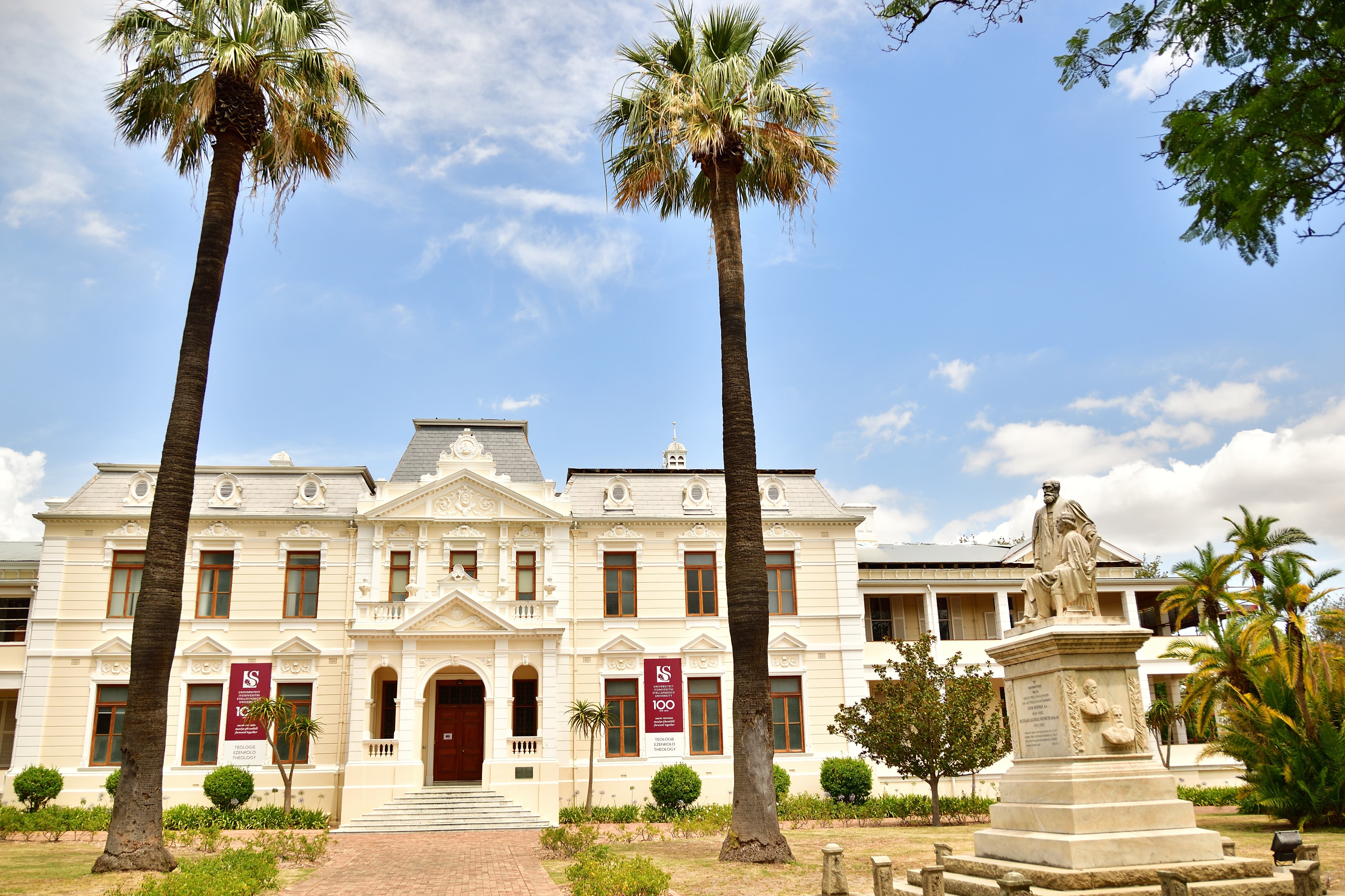
Theological Faculty with the statue to founders academics John Murray and Nicalaas Jacobus Hofmeyr

The university is one of three public universities in the Western Cape and one of about 20 universities in the country.

In the latest edition of the Times Higher Education World University Rankings, Stellenbosch University was ranked in the 251-275 category in the world and third in Africa. Another reputable ranking system, QS World University Rankings recently ranked the university at 390 in the world and also third in Africa.

Leiden University ranked Stellenbosch 395th out of the top 500 universities worldwide on its CWTS Leiden Ranking list of 2013. This list also ranked the university second in both South Africa and Africa, behind only the University of Cape Town.

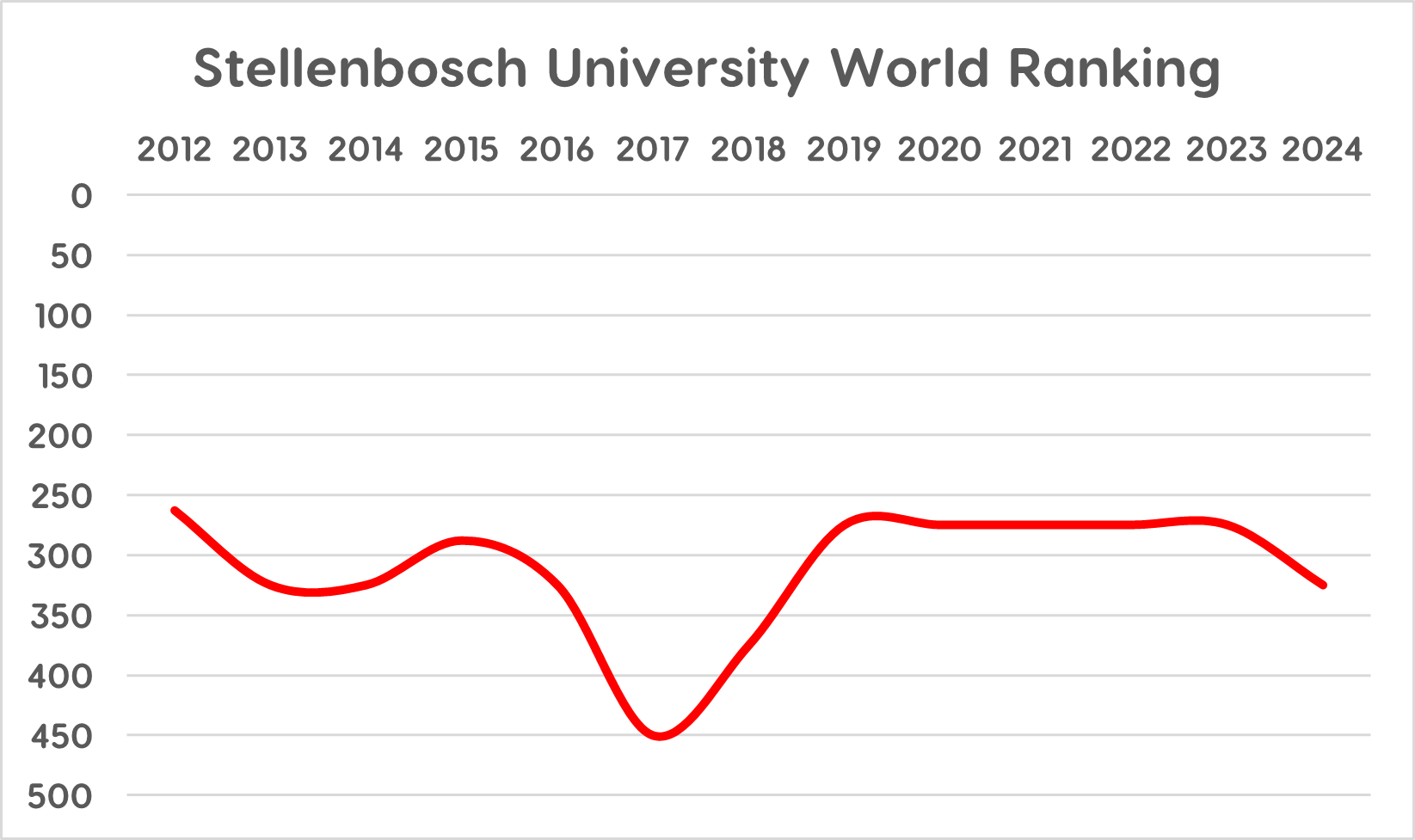
Stellenbosch University World Ranking

Stellenbosch University Times Higher Education Ranking 2012 to 2024
Year	World Rank
2024	301–350
2023	251–300
2022	251–300
2021	251–300
2020	251–300
2019	251–300
2018	351–400
2017	401-500
2016	301-350
2015	276-300
2014	301-350
2013	301-350
2012	251-275

Stellenbosch University consistently ranks in the top 200 worldwide in law, politics and geography.

Stellenbosch University is ranked in the top 100 worldwide in development studies, theology, agriculture and forestry.

In 2012, Webometrics ranked Stellenbosch's web footprint 2nd largest in Africa, again behind the University of Cape Town.

The University of Stellenbosch Business School's MBA program was ranked 65th out of 100 MBA programmes of the leading business schools in the world the Aspen Institute's 2011-12 edition of its Beyond Grey Pinstripes survey. The USB is also the only business school in South Africa, as well as the rest of the continent, to be included in the Top 100 list.

The University of Stellenbosch Business School has triple accreditation (AMBA, EQUIS and AACSB accreditation) and is ranked second in Africa by Eduniversal. The University of Stellenbosch Business School is ranked in the top 100 worldwide in executive education by Financial Times.

== Controversies ==
=== Vice-Chancellor nepotism case ===
In 2023, Vice-Chancellor Wim de Villiers was charged of nepotism. He allegedly used his discretionary right to secure a place for his wife's nephew at the university's medical school. An investigation into the case found that there was no misconduct that warranted his removal from office but that he would have to face financial consequences.

=== Wilgenhof residence scandal ===
In 2024, Wilgenhof Men's Residence faced scandal after concealed rooms were discovered containing artifacts tied to abusive initiation practices. An independent panel investigated the matter and recommended the residence's closure, citing its embodiment of the University's troubled and racist history.

The University's council accepted this recommendation in September, sparking legal challenges from Wilgenhof Alumni Association and the Association for the Advancement of Wilgenhof Residents (AWIR). The residence was shut down for renovations in 2025, with the goal of reopening it as a reimagined male residence.

Further controversy arose when allegations emerged that key university officials had altered the investigation's findings before presenting them. In February 2025, the university and the Wilgenhof Alumni Association settled their dispute over the residence's naming process. The agreement included restoring archival materials and involving the alumni in the renaming, acknowledging the reputational damage suffered by past and present residents.

== Leaders ==
=== Current leaders ===
General Management
Prof Deresh Ramjugernath	Rector and Vice-Chancellor
Governor Lesetja Kganyago	Chancellor
Prof Stan du Plessis	Chief Operating Officer
Prof Hester Klopper	Deputy Vice-Chancellor: Strategy, Global and Corporate Affairs
Prof Nico Koopman	Deputy Vice-Chancellor: Social Impact, Transformation & Personnel
Prof Sibusiso Moyo	Deputy Vice-Chancellor: Research, Innovation and Postgraduate Studies
Prof Richard Stevens	Deputy Vice-Chancellor: Learning and Teaching
Dr Ronel Retief	Registrar
Mr Mohamed Shaikh	Executive Manager: Rectorate

=== Historical ===
Rector
	Period	Surname	Name(s)	Date of Birth	Date of Death
1	1919-1925	Cillié	Gabriël Gideon	10 September 1870	1 April 1958
2	1925-1934	Wilson	Douglas George	25 April 1856	
3	1934-1955	Wilcocks	Raymond William	23 January 1892	16 March 1967
4	1955-1970	Thom	Hendrik Bernardus	31 December 1905	4 November 1983
5	1970-1979	de Villiers	Jan Naude	17 August 1923	
6	1979-1993	de Vries	Michiel Josias	5 May 1933	5 July 2002
7	1993-2002	van Wyk	Andreas Hercules	17 September 1941	
8	2002-2007	Brink	Chris	31 January 1951	
9	2007-2014	Botman	Hayman Russel	18 October 1953	28 June 2014
10	2014-2025	de Villiers	Willem Johan Simon	26 September 1959	
11	2025-Present	Ramjugernath	Deresh	26 July 1972	

Chancellor
	Period	Surname	Name(s)	Date of Birth	Date of Death
1	1918-1919	Marais	Johannes Izak	23 August 1848	27 August 1919
2	1919-1931	Vos	Pieter Jacobus Gerhard	29 October 1842	31 October 1931
3	1931-1932	de Villiers	Jacob Abraham Jeremias	14 December 1868	16 September 1937
4	1932-1939	Moorrees	Adriaan	18 August 1855	17 November 1938
5	1939-1941	Kestell	John Daniel Kestell	15 December 1854	9 February 1941
6	1941-1959	Malan	Daniel Francois	22 May 1874	7 February 1959
7	1959-1968	Dönges	Theophilus Ebenhaezer	8 March 1898	10 January 1968
8	1968-1983	Vorster	Balthazar Johannes	13 December 1915	10 September 1983
9	1983-1983	Thom	Hendrik Bernardus	31 December 1905	4 November 1983
10	1984-1988	Botha	Pieter Willem	12 January 1916	31 October 2006
11	1988-1998	van der Horst	Johannes Gerhardus	19 September 1919	23 April 2003
12	1998-2008	Botha	Elizabeth	19 November 1930	16 November 2007
13	2008-2009	Slabbert	Frederik Van Zyl	2 March 1940	14 May 2010
14	2009-2019	Rupert	Johann Peter	1 June 1950	
15	2019-2025	Cameron	Edwin	15 February 1953	
16	2025-present	Kganyago	Lesetja	7 October 1965	

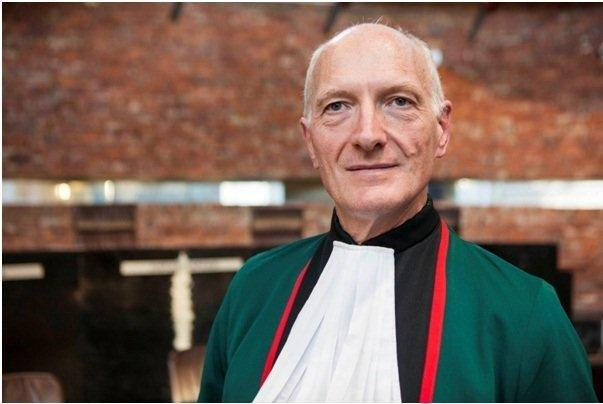
Edwin Cameron, Chancellor (2019-2024)

== Notable alumni ==
=== Science ===
- James L Barnard, civil engineer and pioneer of biological nutrient removal in wastewater treatment
- Johannes Christiaan de Wet, legal scholar, professor, recognized as South Africa's most influential jurist.
- Friedel Sellschop, physicist and pioneer in the field of nuclear physics.
- James Leonard Brierley Smith, ichthyologist, organic chemist and university professor. First to identify a taxidermied fish as a coelacanth, at the time thought long extinct.
- Leopoldt van Huyssteen, soil scientist.
- Lulu Latsky, first woman to earn a PhD at Stellenbosch (1930); zoologist and writer.
- Novel Njweipi Chegou, molecular biologist and winner of the Royal Society Africa Prize in 2022.
- Henda Swart, mathematician
- Taryn Young, physician and epidemiologist.

=== Law ===
- Fritz Brand, judge of the Supreme Court of Appeal of South Africa.
- Baron Steyn, British Law Lord, Lord of Appeal in Ordinary.
- John Dugard, professor of international law at Leiden University former member of the International Law Commission ad hoc judge of the International Court of Justice.
- Lourens Ackermann, former justice of the Constitutional Court of South Africa.
- Edwin Cameron, Rhodes scholar and justice of the Constitutional Court of South Africa.
- Johan Froneman, lawyer and justice of the Constitutional Court of South Africa.
- Jacob de Villiers, judge, Chief Justice of South Africa from 1929 to 1932.
- Nicolaas Jacobus de Wet, politician, lawyer, and judge. Chief Justice of South Africa and acting Governor-General from 1943 to 1945.
- Henry Allan Fagan, judge, Chief Justice of South Africa from 1957 to 1959.
- Monique Nsanzabaganwa, economist, politician and Deputy Governor of the National Bank of Rwanda.
- Lucas Cornelius Steyn, judge, Chief Justice of South Africa from 1959 to 1971.
- Pieter Jacobus Rabie, judge, Chief Justice of South Africa from 1982 to 1989.
- Barend van Niekerk, lawyer and academic.
- Pierre de Vos, constitutional law scholar.
- Brian Currin, human rights lawyer.
- Billy Downer, public prosecutor.

=== Politics ===
- Naledi Pandor, South African Minister of International Relations and Cooperation (South Africa).
- Sandra Botha, former Leader of the Opposition in the National Assembly for the Democratic Alliance (South Africa).
- James Barry Munnik Hertzog, former Prime Minister of the Union of South Africa.
- Magnus André De Merindol Malan, last Minister of defence during the Apartheid era.
- Gerhard Tötemeyer, former Namibian Deputy Minister of Local and Regional Government and Housing.
- Johannes Frederik Janse Van Rensburg, former leader of the Ossewabrandwag.
- Eben Dönges, South African politician who was elected State President of South Africa, but died before he could take office.
- Andries Treurnicht, politician, Minister of Education during the Soweto Riots, founded and led the Conservative Party of South Africa.
- Hendrik Frensch Verwoerd, former apartheid-era Prime Minister of South Africa.
- Balthazar Johannes Vorster, former apartheid-era Prime Minister of South Africa.
- Daniel François Malan, former apartheid-era Prime Minister of South Africa.
- Johannes Gerhardus Strijdom, former apartheid-era Prime Minister of South Africa.
- Frederik van Zyl Slabbert, former opposition politician who became chancellor of Stellenbosch University.
- Jan Smuts, former South African Prime Minister.

=== Business ===
- Koos Bekker, businessman, billionaire chairman of Naspers.
- Sir David de Villiers Graaff, 3rd Baronet businessman.
- Markus Jooste, businessman and the former CEO of Steinhoff International.
- Christo Wiese, businessman, former billionaire, chairman of Shoprite (South Africa).
- Jan Steyn, judge and development leader.
- Beyers Naudé, theologian and anti-apartheid activist.
- Jannie Mouton, businessman, founder and chairman of PSG Group.
- Mark Patterson, private equity investor and founder of MatlinPatterson Global Advisors
- Johann Rupert, billionaire businessman, CEO of Richemont Group and Chancellor of Stellenbosch University
- Japie van Zyl, deputy director of the Jet Propulsion Laboratory.
- Ntsiki Biyela, winemaker and businesswomen.

=== Sport ===
- Stuart Abbott, rugby player.
- Mari Rabie, Rhodes scholar, triathlete.
- Danie Craven, prominent rugby player and sport administrator.
- Ashley Burdett, Zimbabwean cricketer
- Craig Tiley, CEO of Tennis Australia and Director of the Australian Open.
- Attie van Heerden, Olympian, rugby union, and rugby league footballer.
- Jonathan Trott, England Cricketer.
- Max Howell, Australian educator and rugby union player
- Louis Schreuder, rugby union player
- Edrich Lubbe, rugby union player

=== Arts and music ===
- Etienne Leroux, writer and member of the South African Sestigers literary movement.
- Paul Cilliers, philosopher and complexity theorist.
- Casper de Vries, actor and comedian.
- Abraham H. de Vries, writer.
- Liza Grobler, artist.
- Nick Hamman, broadcaster, and digital content creator
- Elsa Joubert, novelist.
- Uys Krige, playwright, poet and translator.
- Cornelis Jacobus Langenhoven, poet who composed words of Afrikaner anthem Die Stem.
- Willim Welsyn, singer, songwriter, guitarist and podcaster.
- Rona Rupert, musician and author of 33 Afrikaans books.
- Johannes du Plessis Scholtz, philologist, art historian and art collector.
- Peet Pienaar, performance artist.
- Cromwell Everson, composer of the first Afrikaans opera.
- Zanne Stapelberg, opera singer.
- Tom Dreyer, novelist and poet writing in both English and Afrikaans.
- Deon van der Walt, opera singer.
- Ernst van Heerden, Afrikaans poet.
- Claudette Schreuders, sculptor and painter
- Karlien de Villiers, artist
- Johannes Kerkorrel, singer-songwriter

=== Academia ===
- Lydia Baumbach, classical scholar
- Estian Calitz, economics professor.
- Johan Degenaar, philosopher.
- André du Pisani, political scientist and professor at University of Namibia.
- Timothy Paul Jones, apologetics scholar.
- Marina Joubert, senior science communication researcher at Stellenbosch University
- Mark Nigrini, academic, accounting professor.
- Vern Poythress, Calvinist philosopher and New Testament scholar.
- Gisela Sole, professor of physiotherapy at University of Otago in New Zealand
- Amanda Swart, biochemist and professor Stellenbosch University
- Sampie Terreblanche, former professor of economics at Stellenbosch and founder member of the Democratic Party.
- Hendrik W. (H.W.) van der Merwe founder of the Centre for Intergroup Studies, University of Cape Town.

=== Other ===
- Mike Horn, adventurer.
- Alfredo Tjiurimo Hengari, political scientist.
- John Laredo, anti-apartheid campaigner.
- Riaan Cruywagen, newsreader and voice artist.
- Siegfried Ngubane, Anglican bishop.
- D. C. S. Oosthuizen, (Daantjie Oosthuizen), philosopher, Christian, critic of Apartheid.
- Wentzel van Huyssteen, religious philosopher known for work on the compatibility of theology and science
- Martin Welz, investigative journalist and editor of South African investigative magazine Noseweek.
- Stefanus Gie, diplomat.
- Vuyokazi Mahlati, social entrepreneur, gender activist and global director of the International Women's Forum
- Max du Preez, author, columnist and the founding editor of Vrye Weekblad

== See also ==
- Stellenbosch University Choir
- List of South African open access repositories
- Rankings of universities in South Africa
- University of Johannesburg
