= Eugène Marais Prize =

South African literary prize

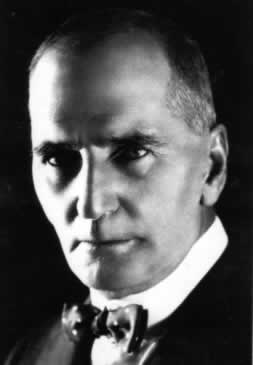
Eugene Marais

The Eugène Marais Prize is a South African literary prize awarded by the Suid-Afrikaanse Akademie vir Wetenskap en Kuns for a first or early publication in Afrikaans. In 1971 it was renamed after the Afrikaans poet and researcher Eugène Marais. The prize has no genre limitation, but only works that have appeared in the previous calendar year are eligible. Further, an author can only win the award once. The prize money (as of 2009) was R22 000 and was sponsored by ABSA and Rapport.

== List of winners ==
- 1961 – Audrey Blignault (In klein maat, Die vrolike lied and her contribution to Die dammetjie)
- 1963 – André P. Brink (Caesar)
- 1964 – Dolf van Niekerk (Skepsels); Elsa Joubert (Ons wag op die kaptein)
- 1965 – George Louw (Koggelstok)
- 1966 – Henriette Grové (all of her dramatic work)
- 1967 – Abraham H. de Vries (all of his prose)
- 1968 – M.M. Walters (Cabala)
- 1970 – P.G. Hendriks (Die weg van ’n man)
- 1971 – Sheila Cussons (Plektrum')
- 1972 – Lina Spies (Digby Vergenoeg)
- 1973 – Antjie Krog (Januarie-suite)
- 1974 – Leon Strydom (Geleentheidsverse)
- 1975 – P.J. Haasbroek (Heupvuur)
- 1976 – J.C. Steyn (Grammatika van liefhê)
- 1978 – Marlene van Niekerk (Sprokkelster)
- 1979 – Eveleen Castelyn (Tussen hemel en aarde)
- 1980 – Petra Müller (Patria)
- 1981 – Annesu de Vos (Gebed van 'n groen perske en ander verse)
- 1982 – Louis Krüger (Die skerpskutter)
- 1983 – E. Kotze (Halfkrone vir die Nagmaal)
- 1984 – Etienne van Heerden (My Kubaan)
- 1985 – Alexander Strachan ('n Wêreld sonder grense)
- 1986 – Freek Swart (Spinola se rooi angelier)
- 1987 – Joan Hambidge (Bitterlemoene); Deon Opperman (Môre is 'n lang dag/Die teken)
- 1988 – P.C. Haarhoff (Uit 'n ander wêreld)
- 1989 – Philip de Vos (Daar's bitterals in die heuningwals)
- 1990 – Henning Pieterse (Alruin)
- 1991 – Pieter Stoffberg (Die hart van ’n hond)
- 1992 – Riana Scheepers (Dulle Griet)
- 1993 – Marita van der Vyver (Griet skryf ’n sprokie)
- 1994 – Mark Behr (Die reuk van appels); Ronel de Goede (Skoop)
- 1995 – Johan Myburg (Kontrafak)
- 1996 – E.W.S. Hammond (Doodsteek van ’n diabeet); A.H.M. Scholtz (Vatmaar)
- 1997 – Jaco Fouché (Die ryk van die rawe)
- 1998 – Johann Botha (Groot vyf)
- 1999 – Cristoffel Coetzee (posthumous) (Op soek na generaal Mannetjies Mentz)
- 2000 – S.P. Benjamin (Die lewe is 'n halwe roman)
- 2001 – Tom Dreyer (Stinkafrikaners)
- 2002 – Dine van Zyl (Slagoffers)
- 2003 – Barbara Fölscher (Reisgenoot)
- 2004 – Ilse van Staden (Watervlerk)
- 2005 – Melanie Grobler (Die waterbreker)
- 2006 – Marlize Hobbs (Flarde)
- 2007 – Danie Marais (In die buitenste ruimte)
- 2008 – Helena Gunter (Op 'n plaas in Afrika)
- 2009 – Ronelda Kamfer (Noudat slapende honde); Loftus Marais (Staan in die algemeen nader aan vensters)
- 2010 – Carel van der Merwe (Geldwolf)
- 2011 – Nicole Jaekel Strauss (Maal)
- 2012 – Sonja Loots (Sirkusboere)
- 2013 – Hennie Nortjé (In die skadu van soveel bome)
- 2014 – Dominique Botha (Valsrivier)
- 2015 – Nicola Hanekom (Die pad byster)
- 2016 – Stephanus Muller (Nagmusiek)
- 2017 – Bibi Slippers (Fotostaatmasjien); Lien Botha (Wonderboom); Amy Jephta (Kristalvlakte)
- 2018 – Fanie Naudé (Die derde spoel)
- 2019 – Andries Buys (Die dao van Daan van der Walt under the pseudonym Lodewyk G. du Plessis)
- 2020 – Johan Jack Smith (Zola')
- 2021 – Jolyn Phillips (Bientang)
- 2022 – Ashwin Arendse (Swatland (poetry) and Frederik de Jager (Man op 'n fiets êrens heen
- 2023 – Kirby van der Merwe (Eugene (prose)
- 2024 – Nicola Hanekom (Mirre en aalwyn (drama) and Pieter Odendaal (Ontaard) (poetry)
