= Ashley Burdett =

Zimbabwean cricketer (born 1994)

Personal information
- Full name: Ashley Burdett
- Born: 14 November 1994 (age 31); Masvingo, Zimbabwe
- Batting: Right-handed
- Bowling: Right-arm off break
- Role: Wicket-keeper

International information
- National side: Zimbabwe
- Source: Cricinfo, 26 August 2021

Ashley Burdett (born 14 November 1994) is a Zimbabwean woman cricketer and former captain of the Zimbabwe women's national cricket team. She captained the Zimbabwe team in the 2013 ICC Women's World Twenty20 Qualifier which was also the inaugural edition of the ICC Women's World Twenty20 Qualifier.

Post-cricket, Burdett graduated from the Stellenbosch University and resides in South Africa.
