= Abraham H. de Vries =

South African short story writer (1937–2024)

Abraham Hermanus de Vries
- Born: 9 February 1937; Ladismith, Western Cape, South Africa
- Died: 23 August 2024 (aged 87)
- Education: Stellenbosch University
- Occupation: Writer
- Known for: Short Stories

Abraham Hermanus de Vries (9 February 1937 – 23 August 2024) was a South African short story writer, considered one of the most respected and beloved in Afrikaans language literature in the Sestigers.

== Early life and career ==
De Vries was born in Ladismith in the then Cape Province in 1937. He studied at Stellenbosch University and the Gemeentelijke Universiteit van Amsterdam, and obtained doctorates from both universities. From 1963 to 1965 he was the art editor for Die Vaderland, a Johannesburg newspaper. He regularly toured overseas and also lectured at different European universities. De Vries was awarded numerous literary prizes, including the Reina Prinsen Geerligs Prize for his first three books, the Eugène Marais Prize for Vliegoog, the Perskor Prize for Briekwa, the De Kat/Potpourri Prize for Die Bruid, and the RAU-prys for creative work in 2004. Vries died on 23 August 2024, at the age of 87.

== Bibliography ==
- 1956 — Hoog teen die heuningkrans
- 1957 — Verlore erwe
- 1959 — Proegoed
- 1961 — Vetkers en neonlig
- 1963 — Dubbeldoor
- 1965 — Die rustelose sjalom
- 1965 — Vliegoog
- 1966 — Afspraak met eergister; Griekse reisjoernaal, Oktober 1965 tot April 1966
- 1966 — Dorp in die Klein Karoo
- 1966 — Kruispad; ’n novelle
- 1968 — Joernaal uit ’n gragtehuis
- 1969 — Twee maal om die son
- 1972 — Volmoed se gasie
- 1973 — Briekwa
- 1975 — Bliksoldate bloei nie
- 1977 — Die Klein Karoo; ’n legkaart (photographs by Paul Alberts)
- 1978 — Die Afrikaanse kortverhaalboek, (compiler)
- 1980 — Kort keur, (compiler)
- 1980 — Die uur van die idiote
- 1983 — Kortom: gids by die Afrikaanse kortverhaalboek
- 1986 — Literêre dagboek, (compiler)
- 1987 — Soms op ’n reis
- 1989 — Kortom II: ’n inleiding by die Afrikaanse kortverhaalboek
- 1989 — Nag van die clown
- 1989 — Steekbaard: die beste Afrikaanse hondestories
- 1994 — ’n Plaaswinkel naby oral
- 1996 — Eeu: honderd jaar van Afrikaanse kortverhale, (samesteller)
- 1997 — Skaduwees tussen skaduwees
- 2000 — Uit die kontreie vandaan
- 2002 — Op die wye oop Karoo: plaaswinkelstories uit die Klein Karoo
- 2003 — Tot verhaal kom
- 2005 — Verhale uit ’n koel voorhuis: die Klein Karoo eersteling
- 2006 — Rooikoos Willemse is soek
- 2006 — Onder hoë sterre
- 2009 — Verbeel jou dis somer
- 2011 — Die behoue huis: 'n keur uit die kortverhale van Abraham H de Vries
- 2013 — Maar wie snoei die rose in die nag?
