= Henda Swart =

South African mathematician

- Born: Hendrika Cornelia Scott; 1939
- Died: February 2016 (aged 76–77)
- Awards: Fellow Royal Society of South Africa

Academic background
- Education: Stellenbosch University
- Thesis: Sesquilinear Curves in Desarguesian Planes
- Doctoral advisor: Kurt-Rüdiger Kannenberg

Academic work
- Discipline: Mathematics
- Sub-discipline: graph theory
- Institutions: University of KwaZulu-Natal, University of Cape Town

Hendrika Cornelia Scott (Henda) Swart FRSSAf (born 1939, died February 2016 [age 77-78]) was a South African mathematician, a professor emeritus of mathematics at the University of KwaZulu-Natal and a professor at the University of Cape Town

== Personal life ==
Born Hendrika Cornelia Scott, she married John Henry Swart. They had three children Christine, Sandra and Gustav.

== Career ==
Swart began teaching at the University of Natal in 1962. She was the first person to earn a doctorate in mathematics from Stellenbosch University, in 1971, with a dissertation on the geometry of projective planes supervised by Kurt-Rüdiger Kannenberg. In 1977, her research interests shifted from geometry to graph theory, which she continued to publish in for the rest of her career.

She was the editor-in-chief of the journal Utilitas Mathematica, and was vice president of the Institute of Combinatorics and its Applications. In 1996 she became a fellow of the Royal Society of South Africa.

Swart was a part-time lecturer at the University of Cape town from 2014 until her death.

== Publications ==
She published under the name Henda C Swart. She published nearly 100 papers from 1980 to 2018.

== Research ==
Swart began her research career in projective geometry, completing her doctoral thesis on Desarguesian planes at Stellenbosch University. During a sabbatical at the University of New Mexico in the late 1970s, she developed an interest in graph theory after attending lectures by Roger C. Entringer. This marked a change in her research direction, and graph theory became the principal focus of her work for the remainder of her career.

== Contributions ==
Swart's research covered several areas of graph theory, including graph vulnerability, distance-related graph parameters and domination theory. She also introduced undergraduate and postgraduate courses in graph theory, design theory, geometry and information security at the University of Natal, helping to establish graph theory as an active research area in South Africa.

== Mentorship ==
Throughout her career, Swart supervised more than twenty master's and doctoral students. Several of her former students later became academics and researchers, and she was widely recognised for encouraging young mathematicians to pursue research careers in graph theory.

== Professional service ==
Swart served as Editor-in-Chief of Utilitas Mathematica and as Vice-President of the Institute of Combinatorics and its Applications. She also served on the Committee of the African Mathematical Union and represented South Africa in international mathematical organisations.

== Honours ==
Swart was elected a Fellow of the Royal Society of South Africa in 1996 in recognition of her contributions to graph theory, mathematics education and research leadership. She later became Professor Emerita at the University of KwaZulu-Natal.
