= Johannes Christiaan de Wet =

( South-African jurist (1912–1990)

- Born: Johannes Christiaan de Wet; October 13, 1912; Zastron, Orange Free State
- Died: 1990 (aged 77–78); Stellenbosch

Academic background
- Education: Stellenbosch University; Leiden University (PhD)
- Theses: Estoppel by representation in South African law (1938); De ontwikkeling van die ooreenkoms ten behoewe van derde (1940)
- Doctoral advisor: Eduard Meijers

Academic work
- Institutions: Stellenbosch University; University of Cape Town
- Notable works: Strafreg (1 ed, 1948); Kontraktereg en Handelsreg (1 ed, 1949)

Johannes Christiaan de Wet (13 October 1912 – 1990) was South Africa's most influential jurist and teacher of law.

== Biography ==
De Wet was a farmer's son and grew up in Aliwal North and Maclear. He studied law at Stellenbosch, attaining doctorates there and in Leiden. He wrote his doctorate at Leiden in four months.

After World War II forced de Wet to return to South Africa in 1942, he taught law at Stellenbosch from 1942 to 1972, making his faculty one of the leading faculties of law in the country. Afterwards, he taught Roman law and comparative law at the University of Cape Town from 1976 to 1981.

== Academic work ==
Among his many publications, the most notable were his seminal textbooks Kontraktereg en Handelsreg (1949, with J.P. Yeats) and Strafreg (1948, with H.L. Swanepoel), which saw several re-editions until the 1980s. With these works, de Wet abandoned the prevailing tradition of constructing legal rules from case law. Inspired by European civil law, he sought instead to construct a consistent framework of terms and principles to serve as a benchmark for case law itself.

Through his work, de Wet enhanced the status of his native Afrikaans by making it a language of scientific legal discourse. His influence particularly on the law of contracts and on penal law was immense. De Wet was known for his acerbic and often amusing criticism of judgments and has been described by Edwin Cameron as the "enfant terrible of the judiciary". This undeferential style, together with his intellectual approach, characterised by critical rationalism and self-assurance, had a liberating impact in the intellectual climate of apartheid-era South Africa.

De Wet was awarded honorary doctorates by the University of Cape Town and the Rand Afrikaans University (now the University of Johannesburg).
