= Deon van der Walt =

South African tenor

Deon van der Walt (28 July 1958 – 29 November 2005), was a South African tenor.

Van der Walt studied at Stellenbosh University and resided at Wilgenhof and made his debut as Jaquino in Beethoven's Fidelio at the Cape Town Opera before he had graduated. Numerous scholarships and awards allowed him to continue his studies abroad. In 1981, he won the Internationaler Mozartwettbewerb in Salzburg. His first formal engagement took him to Gelsenkirchen's Musiktheater im Revier, then to the Staatsoper Stuttgart and Zurich Opera. He was invited to perform at the Royal Opera House in London in 1985 and there made his debut as Almaviva in Rossini's The Barber of Seville.

He was counted amongst the leading lyric tenors of his day and performed at all the world's major opera houses, including

- La Scala in Milan
- the Hamburg State Opera
- the Vienna State Opera
- the Bavarian State Opera in Munich
- the Zurich Opera, Switzerland
- the Liceu in Barcelona
- the Metropolitan Opera in New York

He also performed at numerous international festivals, especially at the Salzburg Festival, where he sang Belmonte in Mozart's Abduction from the Seraglio and Ferrando in Così fan tutte under Riccardo Muti.

On video, he can be seen in Handel's Semele as Jupiter, singing "Where'er you walk"; in Donizetti's Linda di Chamounix with Edita Gruberová; and in La belle Hélène.

Deon van der Walt died at 47 at his family's vineyard in South Africa, shot by his father, who then committed suicide.
