= Japie van Zyl =

Namibian electrical engineer (1957–2020)

Japie Van Zyl
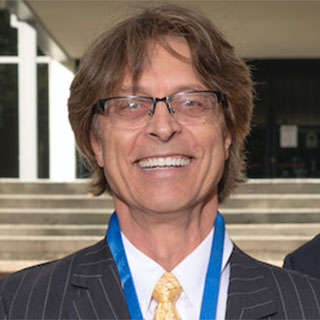
- Born: Jakob van Zyl; 24 February 1957; Outjo, South West Africa (now Namibia)
- Died: 26 August 2020 (aged 63); Pasadena, California
- Education: Stellenbosch University (BEng. Hons.), Caltech (MSc. PhD)
- Known for: Director of Solar System Exploration, JPL Co-director of JPL Director of Astrophysics, JPL Head of Radar Research, JPL Shuttle Radar Topography Mission Spitzer and Kepler telescopes
- Awards: IEEE Global Young Engineer of the Year (1997) IEEE Distinguished Achievement Award (2010) Stellenbosch University Honorary Doctorate (2015)
- Scientific career
- Fields: Astrophysics Electrical Engineering Radar satellite communication Space exploration
- Doctoral advisor: Charles H. Papas

Jakob Johannes "Japie" van Zyl (February 24th 1957 - 26 August 2020) was a Namibian electrical engineer working for NASA.

Van Zyl was born in Outjo, South West Africa (now Namibia). After matric he attended Stellenbosch University where he obtained an honours degree in electronic engineering cum laude in 1979. After a further two years in the South African Navy, he went to California in 1982 where he obtained his MSc degree in electrical engineering from the California Institute of Technology (Caltech) in 1983. In 1986, he completed his PhD in electrical engineering at Caltech and then joined the Jet Propulsion Laboratory (JPL) as a researcher.

In 1990, he was appointed the leader of a group that does advanced radar research with aircraft. They are developing several new techniques to take pictures of the Earth (and other planets) using special radars. In 1995, van Zyl became head of all radar research at the JPL. In 2000, he became deputy head of the organization that implements and launches all of JPL's missions around the Earth. One of the most important missions is the Shuttle Radar Topography Mission which was launched in February 2000 on the Space Shuttle Endeavour.

In 2003, van Zyl was the deputy director and in 2006 the director of astrophysics at the JPL. Under his leadership, various missions were launched, including the Spitzer and Kepler telescopes. In 2011, he became the co - director of the JPL with responsibility for developing the JPL's strategy. The result, known as JPL2025, is a huge success and leads to unprecedented prosperity for the JPL in terms of the number of missions funded by NASA to them. In 2016, he became the director of Solar System exploration at the JPL, where he was responsible for all the missions to planets in the outer part of the Solar System.

Van Zyl was named Global Young Engineer of the Year by the International Institute of Electrical and Electronic Engineering in 1997, and in 1998 he was recognized as a Fellow, an honor bestowed on less than 1% of the organization's members. In 2010, he received the Distinguished Achievement Award from the same organization for his contributions in the field of radar research. He was honored in 2015 with an honorary doctorate in Engineering by the University of Stellenbosch for his work. He had been married to his wife, Calfie, since 1979, and lived in Altadena, California, until his death.

Van Zyl retired in 2020, after 33 years at NASA JPL. He died on 26 August 2020 at the age of 63 in hospital.

The area on Mars where the Ingenuity helicopter took off for the first time, was named the Van Zyl Overlook in his honor.
