= Estian Calitz =

Estian Calitz (born 23 May 1949) is the executive director of finance and professor of economics at Stellenbosch University, South Africa since 2003.

Calitz was born and grew up in the Western Cape Province town of George, South Africa. After completing his master's degree in economics at Stellenbosch University, he first joined the South African Reserve Bank, then the University of Pretoria and Rand Afrikaans University.

He subsequently obtained a PhD in commerce from Stellenbosch University, South Africa in 1986.

In 1989, Calitz became the deputy director-general at the South African Department of Finance and in 1993 he became the director-general. He left the government in 1996 to take up the post of professor of economics at the University of South Africa. Calitz returned to Stellenbosch University in 2001 as the dean of the faculty at the economics and management sciences.
