= Lydia Baumbach =

Academic background
- Education: University of Stellenbosch University of Cambridge

Academic work
- Discipline: Classics
- Sub-discipline: Mycenaean Greek and Linear B
- Institutions: University of Stellenbosch, Rhodes University, University of Pretoria, University of Cape Town

Lydia Baumbach (1924 – 9 February 1991) was a South African classical scholar, known particularly for her work in the field of Mycenaean studies.

== Early life ==
Lydia Baumbach was born in Stellenbosch, South Africa, in 1924, to a German missionary family associated with the Rhenish Mission.

== Education ==
Baumbach attended the Stellenbosch Rhenish Girls' High School until 1942. She then studied at the University of Stellenbosch, achieving two M.A.s with distinction, one in Latin and one in Greek; for each of these she was awarded an Abe Bailey Scholarship. From 1955 to 1957 she attended the University of Cambridge as an Affiliated Student at Newnham College; during this period she studied the Linear B script under the supervision of John Chadwick, which she would continue to focus on in her research throughout her later career.

== Career ==
In 1947, Baumbach began working at the University of Stellenbosch as a Junior Lecturer; after her studies in Cambridge, she took up a position as lecturer at Rhodes University, where she was promoted to Senior Lecturer in 1959. She moved briefly to the University of Pretoria and then became a Senior Lecturer in the University of Cape Town in 1965, where she was appointed as Chair of Classics in 1976; she remained in this position until her retirement in 1988. She taught both Latin and Greek languages and literature, and was a popular public speaker, delivering summer school lectures and tours of Greek sites for Swan Hellenic Tours; she was also active in the Classical Association of South Africa, which she chaired in 1983–1984, becoming the first woman to do so.

Baumbach's research focused mainly on the Mycenaean Greek language and the Linear B writing system; her most important contributions to this field include compiling a vocabulary of Mycenaean Greek (with John Chadwick) in 1963 and publishing the supplement to this work as a sole author (in 1971), as well as being responsible for the compilation of two volumes of the Studies in Mycenaean Inscriptions and Dialect bibliography, published in 1968 and 1986. She also published studies focusing in detail on individual Linear B tablets or series of tablets, as well as a series of articles on the personal names in the Linear B texts, focusing on what the proportions of Greek or non-Greek names found amongst different groups of people showed about Mycenaean society.

== Selected publications ==
- Petroniana. In: Acta Classica 2, 1959, 70-71 (PDF).
- with John Chadwick: The Mycenaean Greek Vocabulary. In: Glotta 41, 1963, 157–271.
- The Mycenaean Greek Vocabulary II. In: Glotta 49, 1971, 151–190.
- The Mycenaean Contribution to Greek Etymology. In: Acta Classica 7, 1964, 1-8 (PDF).
- Studies in Mycenaean inscriptions and dialect. A Complete Bibliography and Index, I: 1953–1964; II: 1965–1978. Rom 1968-1986
- The Dilemma of the Horns – An Analysis of the Knossos Mc Tablets. In: Acta Classica 14, 1971, 1-16 (PDF).
- Further thoughts on PY Vn 46. In: Minos. Revista de Filología Egea 12, 1972, 383–397.
- The "Coming of Age" of Mycenology – the First Twenty-one Years. In: Acta Classica 16, 1973, 1-14 (PDF).
- A Doric Fifth Column? In: Acta Classica 23, 1980, 1-12 (PDF).
- Shakespeare and the Classics. In: Acta Classica 28, 1985, 77–86.
- The Personal Names on the Knossos Ap Tablets. In: Annemarie Etter (Hrsg.): o-o-pe-ro-si. Festschrift für Ernst Risch zum 75. Geburtstag. De Gruyter, Berlin – New York 1986, 273-278 (Google Books).
- Names of Shepherds at Knossos. In: Acta Classica 30, 1987, 5-10 (PDF).
- An examination of the personal names in the Knossos tablets as evidence for the social structure of Crete in the Late Minoan II period. In: Olga Krzyszkowska, Lydia Nixon (eds.): Minoan Society. Proceedings of the Cambridge colloquium 1981. Bristol Classical Press, Bristol 1988, 3–10.
