= Vuyokazi Mahlati =

South African social entrepreneur (died 2020)

- Born: Vuyokazi Mahlati; South Africa
- Occupation: social entrepreneur

Vuyokazi Mahlati (died 12 October 2020) was a South African social entrepreneur, gender activist and global director of the International Women's Forum. She was the founder of Africa’s first indigenous wool processing plant in Butterworth, in the Eastern Cape. She was the president of the African Farmers Association of South Africa, as well as the chairperson of the Advisory Panel on Land Reform and Agriculture. She was serving her second term as a member of South Africa’s National Planning Commission.

== Education ==
She trained as a policy specialist at the London School of Economics in the United Kingdom. She held a PhD from Stellenbosch University.

== Career ==
In September 2013, she was appointed to serve as the Deputy Chair of the State Information Technology Agency. She served two terms as the Chairperson of the South African Post Office Board of Directors where she led the corporatization strategy from traditional to digital business in mail, logistics and banking. She also served two terms on the Financial Markets Advisory Board and was a member of the Financial Services Board Licensing Committee. In addition, she served as the director of Alexkor Mining Board and the fund manager of Umbono Capital now One Stone. She was the non-executive director of Lion of Africa Insurance Company, a subsidiary of the Brimstone Investment Company, one of the Johannesburg Stock Exchange companies. She was also the Principal Consultant and Co-owner of African Financial Group. She founded Africa’s first indigenous wool processing plant in Butterworth, in the Eastern Cape, where she taught unemployed people how to make cashmere garments.

== Death ==
Mahlati died on 12 October 2020.

== Awards and recognition ==
- 2019 - She won the African Women Chartered Accountants (AWCA) Woman of Substance Award
