= Johan Degenaar =

Johannes Jacobus (Johan) Degenaar
- Born: 7 March 1926; Stellenbosch, South Africa
- Died: 22 July 2015 (aged 89); Stellenbosch, South Africa
- Occupations: philosopher, Professor
- Spouse: Jetty Maria Houtman
- Children: Hans, Marc
- Awards: Stalsprys (1984), NP van Wyk Louw medal (1998), Order of Ikhamanga (2004)

Education
- Education: Stellenbosch University

Philosophical work
- Era: 20th-century philosophy
- Institutions: Stellenbosch University
- Doctoral students: Paul Cilliers
- Notable works: Die Herhaling van die vraag na die Filosofie (1951), Moraliteit en Politiek (1976)

Johannes Jacobus Degenaar OIS (7 March 1926 – 22 July 2015) was a South African philosopher, and emertitus professor at the Stellenbosch University, who is considered "one of the most respected and influential philosophers in South Africa."

== Biography ==
Degenaar started to study theology and philosophy in 1943 at the University of Stellenbosch, where he obtained his MA degree in 1948 with a thesis entitled Kennis as Lewe (Life of knowledge), advised by Professor Freddie Kirsten. He continued to study Dutch, and graduated with a doctoral dissertation on Max Scheler's ethics advised by Helmuth Plessner. In 1951 he obtained his PhD under the supervision of Kirsten Bosch for the thesis entitled "Die herhaling van die vraag na die filosofie" (Repeating the question of philosophy). In 1949 he started as lecturer in philosophy at the University of Stellenbosch. In 1969 he was appointed as Professor and later also as Head of Department. Among his PhD students was Paul Cilliers (PhD, 1994). These roles he fulfilled until his retirement in 1991.

In 1984 he was awarded the Stalsprys; in 1998 the NP van Wyk Louw medal; and in 2004 the Order of Ikhamanga for his "excellent contribution to philosophy and literature, his intellectual honesty and principled role in the broad struggle to resist conformity to the apartheid ideology." The University of Port Elizabeth (1997) and the University of Stellenbosch (2001) granted him honorary doctorates. He is married to Jetty Maria, born Houtman, and has two sons, Hans and Marc. They live in Stellenbosch.

== Work ==
In the 1950s Degenaar was primarily concerned with phenomenological-existential, aesthetic and theological work in philosophy. He lectures on the works of Søren Kierkegaard, and through his courses and writings of Albert Camus and Martin Heidegger he introduced South Africans to existentialism. His motto in life and work was the Socratic statement "'n Ongeëksamineerde lewe is nie die moeite werd om te leef nie" (An unexamined life is not worth living).

He also wrote on political and ethical dilemmas of the South African society, and since the 1960s he was an outspoken critic of the apartheid ideology. After clashes with the authorities of the Dutch Reformed Church, he had to leave the Philosophy department and was appointed head of the Department of Political Philosophy. He also questioned the twentieth century ideologies of nationalism, liberalism and socialism and investigate the feasibility of a pluralistic democracy in South Africa. He further wrote about ethnicity, violence, and the relationship between art and society.

== Publications ==
- 1951. Die Herhaling van die vraag na die Filosofie. Stellenbosch: US, Unpublished PhD thesis.
- 1955. "Søren Kierkegaard, 1813-1855." Standpunte 10(2): 63-65.
- 1962. Eksistensie en Gestalte. Johannesburg: Simondium.
- 1963. Die Sterflikheid van die Siel. Johannesburg: Simondium
- 1963. Op Weg na 'n Nuwe Politieke Lewenshouding. Kaapstad: Tafelberg
- 1965. Evolusie en Christendom. 'n Opstel oor Teilhard de Chardin. Kaapstad: Simondium
- 1966. Die Wêreld van Albert Camus. Johannesburg: APB.
- 1967. Sekularisasie. Pretoria: Academica.
- 1969. Beweging Uitwaarts in samewerking met W. A. de Klerk en Marthinus Versfeld. Kaapstad: John Malherbe.
- 1974. "Pluralisme." Standpunte 27(3): 6-21.
- 1976. Moraliteit en Politiek. Kaapstad: Tafelberg.
- 1978. Afrikaner Nationalism. Cape Town: Centre for Intergroup Studies.
- 1978. Christian Responsibility in South Africa's Plural Society. Cape Town: The Centre.
- 1980. Voorbestaan in Geregtigheid: Opstelle oor die politieke rol van die Afrikaner. Kaapstad: Tafelberg.
- 1982. Marxism-Leninism and its implications for South Africa. Cape Town: Academica
- 1982. The roots of Nationalism. Cape Town: Academica.
- 1982. Keuse vir die Afrikaner. Johannesburg: Taurus.
- 1982. Ideologies: ways of looking at South Africa. Cape Town: Dept. of Extramural Studies.
- 1986. Art and the Meaning of Life. Cape Town: Dept. of Extramural Studies.
- 1991. "The Myth of a South African Nation." IDASA Occasional Papers 40: 1-20.
- 1996. "The concept of Politics in Postmodernism." Politikon 23(2): 54-71.
- 1999. Die spanning tussen Voortbestaan en Geregtigheid. Amsterdam: NZAV.
- 2000. "Multiculturalism. How can the human world live its difference?" In W.E. Vugt; G.D. Cloete (eds.): Race and Reconciliation in South Africa. Lanham: Lexington Books.
- 2008. Die Tweede Refleksie. 'n Keur uit die denke van Johan Degenaar. Samest.: W.L. van der Merwe en P. Duvenage. Stellenbosch: SUN Press. (In pers.)
