= Marina Joubert =

South African science communication researcher

Catherina Magdelena Joubert
- Born: 21 April 1963 (age 62); Cape Town, South Africa
- Education: BSc Food Science (1984); BSc (Hons) (1986); BA Journalism (Hons) (1987); MSc Agric (1989); PhD (2018)
- Alma mater: University of Pretoria (MSc); Stellenbosch University (PhD)
- Known for: Science communication education
- Awards: NSTF award Honorary Life Member (PCST)
- Scientific career
- Fields: Science communication
- Institutions: NRF; University of Pretoria; Stellenbosch University
- Thesis: Factors influencing the public communication behaviour of publicly visible scientists in South Africa (2018)
- Academic advisors: Pieter Weingart, Johann Mouton
- Website: Marina Joubert at CREST

Marina Joubert is a senior science communication researcher at The Centre for Research on Evaluation, Science and Technology (CREST) at Stellenbosch University. Previously, she was the communication manager for the National Research Foundation and managed her own independent science communication consultancy for a decade. Her consultancy presented the first online course in science communication in Africa.

Joubert has been honoured with the NSTF award for "Communication for Outreach and Creating Awareness" and is an honorary life member of the Public Communication of Science and Technology (PCST) Network (Australia), granted for "distinguished contribution to the international science communication community".

She is an outspoken proponent of science communication and opposes anti-vaccination propaganda, and all quackery and pseudoscience in general.

== Education and career ==
Joubert obtained her BSc Food Science (Cum Laude) at Stellenbosch University in 1984, followed by BSc Honours (Cum Laude) in 1986 and Journalism Honours (Cum Laude) in 1987. She completed her MSc (Cum Laude) at University of Pretoria in 1989 and her PhD at Stellenbosch University in 2018.

From 1989 she worked as communication manager for the Foundation for Research Development, followed by the National Research Foundation (NRF) in 1999. In 2001, Joubert became science communication manager for the South African Agency for Science and Technology Advancement (SAASTA) (part of the NRF).

In 2005 Joubert established Southern Science, an independent science communication consultancy, that she managed until March 2014. Part of her work during this time was to co-present science communication workshops, aimed at early-career academics, in conjunction with Robert Inglis and the University of Pretoria. The course was the first online course in science communication in Africa and more than 180 African science communicators had completed this course by 2019.

In 2014, Joubert joined the University of Pretoria under contract as research communication specialist and part-time lecturer/researcher at Stellenbosch University. In 2015 she became a senior researcher at Stellenbosch University.

=== Interviews, conferences, studies ===
Joubert has been interviewed several times as part of her work. In 2017 she participated in the International summit on quackery and pseudoscience held in Stellenbosch. The summit covered areas such as: the rise and dangers of pseudoscience and science denialism, communicating uncertainty in science, health regulation, science in court, the media and pseudoscience, and exploiting the desperately ill, the vulnerable and the ignorant. Her presentation was on "Science-based evidence: Accurate and ethical communication."

Joubert was interviewed by Inside Education in 2017 with regards to the journal article In the footsteps of Einstein, Sagan and Barnard: Identifying South Africa’s most visible scientists. In the interview she explained that less than 1% of the scientific workforce appears in public. Therefore, these "visible scientists are increasingly recognised as the new scientific elite, because their high public profiles allow them to spread their ideas, influence policymakers, defend science and promote a culture of science in society. In our society, they are also the role models that shape the public image of science.”

In 2018, Joubert said a collaboration was planned with researchers from the United States, UK and Australia with the "study aimed to better understand the messages and claims of anti-vaccination lobby groups and their potential impact on vaccination programmes in South Africa. .... We are hoping to collaborate with a number of countries to see how these groups formulate their arguments, what evidence they use and how they validate their arguments." The study was to run from 2019 to 2021. She has also been interviewed in this regard by CapeTalk radio station.

== Awards and associations ==
Amongst the awards presented to Joubert are:

- 2015 - NSTF award for "Communication for Outreach and Creating Awareness"
- 2018 - Media Excellence Award from Stellenbosch University

Joubert is a member of several organisations, including:

- Honorary Life Member of the Public Communication of Science and Technology (PCST) Network (Australia) for "a distinguished contribution to the international science communication community"
- The scientific committee of the PCST Network
- The editorial board of JCOM (Journal of Science Communication)
- Advisory board of the SAGE journal “Science Communication”
- Technical editor for Journal of Geoscience Communication
- South African Women in Science
- South African Science Journalists’ Association

== Selected publications ==
- 2017 - Joubert, Marina; Guenther, Lars (29 November 2017). "In the footsteps of Einstein, Sagan and Barnard: Identifying South Africa's most visible scientists". South African Journal of Science. 113 (11/12). Academy of Science of South Africa: 9. doi:10.17159/sajs.2017/20170033. ISSN 1996-7489.
- 2017 - Joubert, Marina (29 November 2017). "Chris Barnard: South Africa's fallible king of hearts". South African Journal of Science. 113 (11/12). Academy of Science of South Africa: 4. doi:10.17159/sajs.2017/a0243. ISSN 1996-7489.
- 2018 - Meyer, Corlia; Guenther, Lars; Joubert, Marina (20 March 2018). "The Draw-a-Scientist Test in an African context: comparing students' (stereotypical) images of scientists across university faculties". Research in Science & Technological Education. 37 (1). Informa UK Limited: 1–14. doi:10.1080/02635143.2018.1447455. ISSN 0263-5143. S2CID 148729481.
- 2019 - Weingart, Peter; Joubert, Marina (14 June 2019). "The conflation of motives of science communication — causes, consequences, remedies". Journal of Science Communication. 18 (3). Sissa Medialab: Y01. doi:10.22323/2.18030401. ISSN 1824-2049.
