= Barend van Niekerk =

Professor Barend van Niekerk (born Pietermaritzburg, Kwa-Zulu Natal, South Africa, 1939; died Bolivia 1981) was a South African acclaimed jurist, a campaigning legal academic and a prominent human rights and anti-apartheid activist in South Africa in the 1970s and early 1980s. This "maverick law professor" was prosecuted twice (and convicted once) by the South African state prosecutor and privately sued once, all such actions being based on his supposed contempt of court. He was indeed a fearless critic of the apartheid legal system, in particular of the judiciary's racial bias in setting death penalties, but also of imprisonment, torture and solitary confinement; freedom of speech; and the role (and shortcomings) of the judiciary.

A gifted linguist and great traveller, his post-graduate studies took him to the universities of Heidelberg, Bonn and Strasbourg, and in the process he became fluent in English, French, and German, and met his future wife, Traute von Oehsen. Despite his undoubted intellectual brilliance, he was anything but an otherworldly academic; indeed, as Cry the Beloved Country author, Alan Paton, noted, his "intellectual eminence was hidden from many by his downright earthiness, and by the downright earthiness of his language".

Professor van Niekerk was also prominent in campaigning against the destruction of Durban's architectural heritage, in the process making enemies of many commercial and property interests, thus proving his own adage that "if you haven't made enemies, you've made nothing". He thought nothing of climbing a ladder to paint the roof of Durban's Old Station that he and others campaigned to save.

A graduate of Stellenbosch University, he served as Professor of Law at the Howard College School of Law, University of KwaZulu-Natal until his death, also holding a professorial chair at the University of the Witwatersrand. His publications include the posthumous "The Cloistered Virtue: Freedom of Speech and the Administration of Justice in the Western World"; "The Taboos in legal research - a personal case history" (in which he discussed his trial and conviction for contempt of court); and, reflecting his other campaigning interest as well as his love for his home city, "Durban At Your Feet, an alternative guide to a city".

In recent years Barend van Niekerk's leading role in campaigning for human rights in apartheid South Africa has been acknowledged by, inter alia, UNHCR Special Rapporteur and International Court of Justice judge John Dugard, Constitutional Court judge Kate O'Regan, ANC activist and Robben Island prisoner Mac Maharaj, Sir Sydney Kentridge QC, Australian judge David Ipp and Kwa-Zulu Natal's premier, Sibusiso Ndebele.

Barend van Niekerk died of heart failure while travelling at altitude in Bolivia in 1981. He was survived by his wife and two daughters. The University of Kwa-Zulu Natal gives an annual Barend Van Niekerk Prize for the most outstanding Jurisprudence law student.

At van Niekerk's funeral service, Alan Paton, who gave the eulogy, noted that the form of blessing used "asks God to give Barend peace, now and for ever. Well I am not sure that Barend would want peace for ever. Rather let us ask that he should rest for a week or two before he starts campaigning for improvements in heaven."
