= Taryn Young =

- Born: 1972 (age 53–54)
- Education: MB ChB, MMed University of Cape Town; PhD Stellenbosch University
- Scientific career
- Fields: Public Health; Epidemiology
- Workplaces: Stellenbosch University
- Thesis: Development of a best practice model for teaching and learning evidence-based health care at Stellenbosch University (2015)

Taryn Young is the Director of the Centre for Evidence-based Health Care and Head of the Division of Epidemiology and Biostatistics at Stellenbosch University. She is a member of the Academy of Science of South Africa. Professor Young has co-authored over 100 peer-reviewed scholarly articles. Her research has focused on summarising and interpreting medical research.
