= Paul Cilliers =

Friedrich Paul Cilliers (25 December 1956 – 31 July 2011) was a South-African philosopher, complexity researcher, and Professor in Complexity and Philosophy at Stellenbosch University. He was known for his contributions in the field of complex systems.

== Biography ==
Cilliers studied at Stellenbosch University from mid-1970s to 1994. There he received his BA in Electronic Engineering in 1980, his BA cum laude in Political Philosophy in 1987, and his MA cum laude in Philosophy in 1989. Eventually he received his PhD in 1994 from Stellenbosch University and Cambridge University under supervision of Johan Degenaar and Mary Hesse.

Cilliers started his academic career at Stellenbosch University, where in 1993 he became a lecturer in philosophy. Since 2003 he was Professor of Complexity and Philosophy at Stellenbosch. In the year 2008 he was Visiting Professor at the University of Humanistic Studies in Utrecht in the Netherlands.

In 2006 Cilliers was awarded the Harry Oppenheimer Fellowship Award in recognition of his achievements in developing a general understanding of the characteristics and nature of complex systems. In 2008 the National Research Foundation of South Africa awarded him an A-rating, and in 2010 he was elected fellow of the Royal Society of South Africa.

== Work ==
Cilliers' research specialisation was on complexity, ethical implications of complexity theory and philosophy of science. In his book Complexity and Postmodernism he takes a postmodern approach to complexity.

== Publications ==
Cilliers authored and co-authored numerous publications in the field of philosophy and complexity science. Books, a selection:

- 1998. Complexity and Postmodernism. Understanding complex systems. London: Routledge.
- 2007. Thinking Complexity. Paul Cilliers (ed.). Mansfield USA : ISCE Publishing.
- 2009: Complexity, Difference and Identity. An ethical perspective. Paul Cilliers and Rika Allen. (eds.)

Articles, a selection:

- Cilliers, Paul. "Knowledge, complexity, and understanding." Emergence, A Journal of Complexity Issues in Organizations and Management 2.4 (2000): 7-13.
- Cilliers, Paul (2000). "What can we learn from a theory of complexity?" (PDF). Emergence. 2 (1): 23–33. doi:10.1207/S15327000EM0201_03.
- Cilliers, Paul (2001). "Boundaries, hierarchies and networks in complex systems" (PDF). International Journal of Innovation Management. 5 (2): 135–147. doi:10.1142/S1363919601000312.
- Richardson, Kurt A., Paul Cilliers, and Michael Lissack. "Complexity Science." Emergence 3.2 (2001): 6-18.
- Cilliers, Paul. "Complexity, deconstruction and relativism." Theory, Culture & Society 22.5 (2005): 255-267.
- Heylighen, Francis, Paul Cilliers, and Carlos Gershenson. "Complexity and philosophy." arXiv preprint cs/0604072 (2006).
