= Peet Pienaar =

Peet Pienaar (born 29 August 1971 near Potchefstroom, South Africa) is a South African graphic designer and illustrator. He has worked with The New York Times, MTV, Diesel, Comme des Garçons, Camper, Moncler, Babylonstoren, and Bos Ice Tea.

Pienaar studied fine art at the University of Stellenbosch, graduating in 1994, and was first noticed by a wider public in 1996 when he - a former provincial rugby union player, and the son of Afrikaans speaking farmers - dressed as a Springbok rugby player and stood motionless for hours in various public and institutional spaces in South Africa including Newlands Stadium and the South African National Gallery.

Rugby union is the national obsession among many white, mostly Afrikaans speaking South Africans, and Pienaar wanted to explore the homoerotic aspect of the myths and hero-worship with which players are treated, and the constructs which define masculinity in a patriarchal society.

"I'm using art as an excuse to live a very interesting life - it allows you to be whoever you want to be, do whatever you want to do, go where ever you want to go. It's like a free ticket" .

Pienaar was active in the South African art world as a conceptual and performance artist in the 1990s.

In 2000, the artist videotaped himself undergoing circumcision. The discarded foreskin, displayed in a small perspex case, was part of an installation with a three-monitor video showing the circumcision operation in excruciating close-up. This work was acquired by the Durban Art Gallery.

In 2000, Pienaar founded influential Cape Town based studio Daddy buy me a pony with Heidi Chisholm, where they produced the internationally acclaimed Afro Magazine. The aim of the publication was to celebrate the outstanding creativity of the African continent. The magazine won a Golden Clio and Gold at the One Show Awards in 2004 for its innovative design.

In 2011, Pienaar and publisher Hannerie Visser established The President, a creative studio based in downtown Cape Town.

In 2017, Pienaar was a founding member of Mami Wata Surf, an African surf brand, where he served as creative director. The brand's film work won numerous awards including a Cannes Lion in 2017. French-Italian brand Moncler partnered with Mami Wata through its Moncler Genius program to release a limited collaboration in 2020.
