= H. W. van der Merwe =

South African academic (1929–2001)

Hendrik W. van der Merwe (24 June 1929 – 5 March 2001) was a South African academic, a Quaker, and a pioneer of conflict resolution. He founded the Abe Bailey Institute for Inter-Racial Studies (now the Centre for Intergroup Studies) at the University of Cape Town in 1968.

He was born on 24 June 1929 in rural South Africa, about 130 miles (210 km) east of Cape Town. Brought up a Calvinist, he later became a Quaker. He received his BA in 1956 and his MA in sociology in 1957, from Stellenbosch University. In 1963, he was awarded a PhD in sociology by the University of California, Los Angeles. He returned to South Africa, where he taught sociology at Rhodes University, Grahamstown from 1963 to 1968. In the latter year, he became the founding director of the Centre for Intergroup Studies; he was its executive director until 1992. In that year, he was made emeritus honorary professor of the University of Cape Town. He served as senior consultant for two more years, before retiring in 1994. He died of cancer on 5 March 2001 at his farm, near his birthplace.

His memoir, Peacemaking in South Africa: A Life in Conflict Resolution (with a foreword by Nelson Mandela) recalls how in 1984 he was the first to arrange meetings between the then-banned African National Congress (in exile) and South African newspaper editors.
