= Mark Nigrini =

South African professor

Mark J. Nigrini
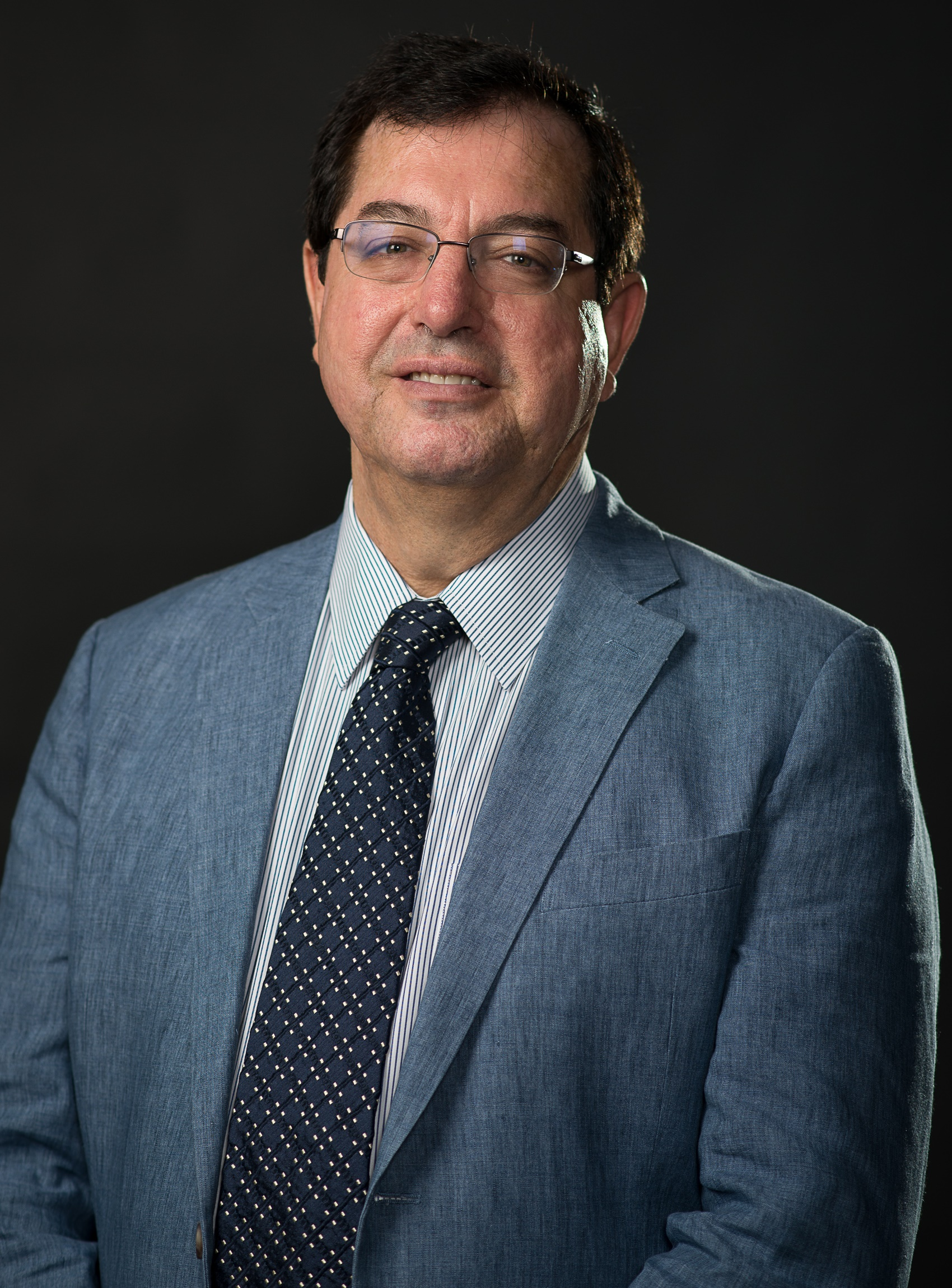
- Born: Cape Town, South Africa
- Citizenship: United States of America
- Education: University of Cincinnati (PhD); University of Stellenbosch (M.B.A.); University of Cape Town B.Com (Hons)
- Occupation: Associate Professor of Accounting
- Employer: West Virginia University
- Known for: Publications related to Benford's Law
- Awards: Journal of Accountancy, Lawler Award 2014
- Website: nigrini.com

Mark J. Nigrini, born in Cape Town, South Africa, is an Associate Professor of Accounting at the College of Business and Economics at West Virginia University in Morgantown, West Virginia.

== Early life and education ==
Nigrini has a B.Com (Hons) degree from the University of Cape Town, an MBA degree from the University of Stellenbosch, and a PhD degree from the University of Cincinnati. In addition to his academic credentials, Nigrini passed the Chartered Accountant (South Africa) exam in 1981 and his early accounting career included time with Peat, Marwick, Mitchell & Co. (now KPMG) and as a divisional accountant.

== Career ==
=== Research ===
Nigrini is best known for his work on using Benford's Law as an auditing and accounting tool to detect anomalies in company data. He is the author of Forensic Analytics which describes data analytics tests designed to detect fraud, errors, estimates, and biases in financial data. He is also the author of Benford's Law. Benford's Law gives the expected patterns of the digits in tabulated data and it has been used by auditors and scientists to detect anomalies in tabulated data.

In August 2014 Nigrini published an article, Lessons from an $8 million fraud, with Nathan J. Mueller who stole $8.45 million from his employer, an insurance company, over a four-year period. In the article Mueller describes his fraud scheme, how he explained his newfound wealth in the form of expensive cars, watches, nightlife entertainment, and Las Vegas gambling trips, to his wife and friends, and ultimately how he was caught. Mueller served his sentence at Federal Prison Camp, Duluth, a minimum security federal prison. He was released on February 27, 2015. In the article Nigrini reviews the preventive and detective anti-fraud measures that could have detected the multimillion-dollar fraud four years before it was detected, and only by chance. Nigrini and Mueller won the Lawler Prize for the article in 2014.

=== Journal editing and other work ===
Nigrini serves on the Executive Editorial Board of the International Journal of Disclosure and Governance and also of the Journal of Forensic & Investigative Accounting.

Nigrini has served as an expert witness and has done consulting engagements for large international organisations and government departments at the state level.

== Recognition ==
=== Media coverage ===
Nigrini's forensic work has been referenced in the media including The Financial Times, The New York Times, The Wall Street Journal, The Globe and Mail, and New Scientist. His work has also been featured in foreign language publications such as Der Spiegel. His radio interviews have included the BBC in London, and NPR in the United States. His television interviews have included appearances on NBC's Extra and Investigation Discovery for their series on Evil Twins. A recent interview filmed in Ottawa, Ontario in December, 2019 for the Audit Informer addressed some advanced aspects of Benford's Law.

=== Awards ===
Nigrini is the recipient of the West Virginia Society of Certified Public Accountants' Outstanding Educator Award for 2020.

=== Notable lectures and keynotes ===
In October 2013, Nigrini delivered the Sufrin Lectureship in Accounting at the University at Buffalo. In April 2014 Nigrini presented a pre-conference workshop in Palm Springs, California at the annual conference of the National Association of Purchasing Card Professionals on using Forensic Analytics to detect purchasing card fraud, errors, waste and abuse. He also presented a keynote talk on Benford's Law at the same conference. In June 2014 he presented a pre-conference workshop in San Antonio, Texas at the annual global conference of the Association of Certified Fraud Examiners on Benford's Law and Analytical Fraud Detection Techniques. In October, 2018 he presented two break-out sessions and one general session at the 27th Annual Conference of the International Association of Airline Internal Auditors held in Panama City, Panama. Nigrini, along with Arno Berger, Theodore Hill, and Steven Miller, were keynote speakers at the Benford's Law Conference organized by the European Union (Stresa, Italy, 10–12 July 2019).
