= Sampie Terreblanche =

South African economist (1933–2018)

Solomon Johannes Terreblanche
- Born: 17 April 1933; Kroonstad, Union of South Africa
- Died: 17 February 2018 (aged 84)

Academic background
- Education: University of Stellenbosch (MA) (Pd.D.); Harvard (1968–1969)

Solomon Johannes "Sampie" Terreblanche (17 April 1933 – 17 February 2018) was a South African academic economist and writer, author of numerous economics books and was most famous for his History of Inequality in South Africa, 1652–2002. He was Professor emeritus of Economics at Stellenbosch University, where he built a reputation as a lecturer in History of economic thought, Economic history, the Economy of South Africa, and economic systems.

== Education ==
Terreblanche matriculated from Edenville High School in the Orange Free State and went on to study at Stellenbosch University, where he obtained a BA degree with economics as one of his major subjects, and later he obtained his Master's Degree and a Doctorate in Philosophy. Later he went on to spend three months at Harvard University in 1968/1969. He was appointed to the Chair of Economics, teaching economics history, at Stellenbosch University.

== Academic career ==
Terreblanche lectured at the University of the Orange Free State for eight years. He returned to lecture at Stellenbosch University from 1968 until his retirement in 2003. In the 1980s, whilst still a prominent member of the National Party, a member of the Afrikaner Broederbond and a "Hoofwag" of the Ruiterwag, Terreblanche in 1985 established the "Discussion group '85" at Stellenbosch. He was appointed as a member of the Board of Control of the SABC, and became its deputy chairman, until he was not reappointed as board member in 1987. As a result of this, he quit the National Party, also due to growing doubts and disagreements with its policies of Apartheid and became one of the government's strongest Afrikaans critics. He was a founding member of the Democratic Party (forerunner to the Democratic Alliance) and of the Vrye Weekblad of Max du Preez, but is no longer involved in politics. In 2008 he co-wrote an article to the South African media with Drucilla Cornell and Mahmood Mamdani calling for the establishment of a Justice and Reconciliation Commission to "educate whites, who were the beneficiaries of this exploitative system [Apartheid], as well as to develop a programme of reparations, restitution and perhaps most important, the establishment of economic measures that could effectively grapple with the devastating institutional effects of an internal system of colonisation."

== Publications ==
- Die industriele groeiproses, 1770–1940 (1967)
- Die doelwit van 'n hoë ekonomiese groeikoers (1973)
- Chroniese gemeenskapsarmoede (1977)
- Vernuwing en herskikking (1973)
- Die wording van die Westerse ekonomie (1980)
- Politieke ekonomie en sosiale welvaart, met 'n toepassing op Suid-Afrika (1986)
- Geskiedenis van die Westerse ekonomie (1988)
- 'n Geskiedenis van opeenvolgende ekonomiese stelsels (1994)
- A history of inequality in South Africa, 1652–2002, University of KwaZulu-Natal Press (2003)
- Lost in Transformation – South Africa's Search for a New Future since 1986, KMM Review Publishing, (2012)
- Verdeelde land, Tafelberg Publishers (2014)
- Western Empires, Penguin Random House (2015)
