= Lulu Latsky =

South African writer and zoologist (1901–1980)

- Lulu Latsky
- Born: 22 October 1901 Carnarvon, Cape Colony
- Died: 8 November 1980 (aged 79) Tamboerskloof, South Africa
- Language: Afrikaans
- Education: University of Stellenbosch
- Genre: Children's
- Subjects: Zoology

Lulu Latsky (22 October 1901 – 8 November 1980) was a South African writer and zoologist, and the first woman to earn a doctorate in science in South Africa. She wrote about 70 books including many that were written for children and based on her knowledge of zoology.

== Early life and education ==
Louise "Lulu" Latsky was born in Carnarvon, Cape Colony as the daughter of the Rev. Christoffel Hermanus Engelbertus Latsky and Johanna Maria Sterrenberg Latsky. Her grandfather, Jan Latsky, was born in Lithuania, and settled in South Africa after being stationed there during military service, in the 1810s. Her father was a clergyman in the Dutch Reformed Mission Church, the founding pastor of the United Reformed Church in Stellenbosch (1905). She was raised in Stellenbosch. As a girl she requested to take Greek at a nearby boys' school, but her request was denied. She attended the University of Stellenbosch, and earned degrees in zoology and botany before becoming the first South African woman to complete the requirements for a D.Sc. (Doctorate in Science), and the first woman to earn any doctorate at the University of Stellenbosch, in 1930.

== Career ==
Latsky began an academic career in zoology at Potchefstroom University in 1932, but her chronic poor health and her parents' health required her to return to Stellenbosch and tending to their needs, and her own. During her time at home, she began writing children's books in Afrikaans, mostly about animals, boiling down her undergraduate zoology lectures for even younger audiences. She eventually published about seventy books, forty-seven of them for children. She was also the children's science editor for the Nasionale Pers.

== Personal life ==
Latsky lived in Stellenbosch till her father's death in 1950. She moved to Sea Point with her widowed mother and older brother. After they both died, she moved again, to Tamboerskloof, where her younger brother Peter Sterrenberg Latsky, a clergyman in Cape Town, lived. She died there in 1980, aged 79.
