= Tom Dreyer =

South African novelist and poet

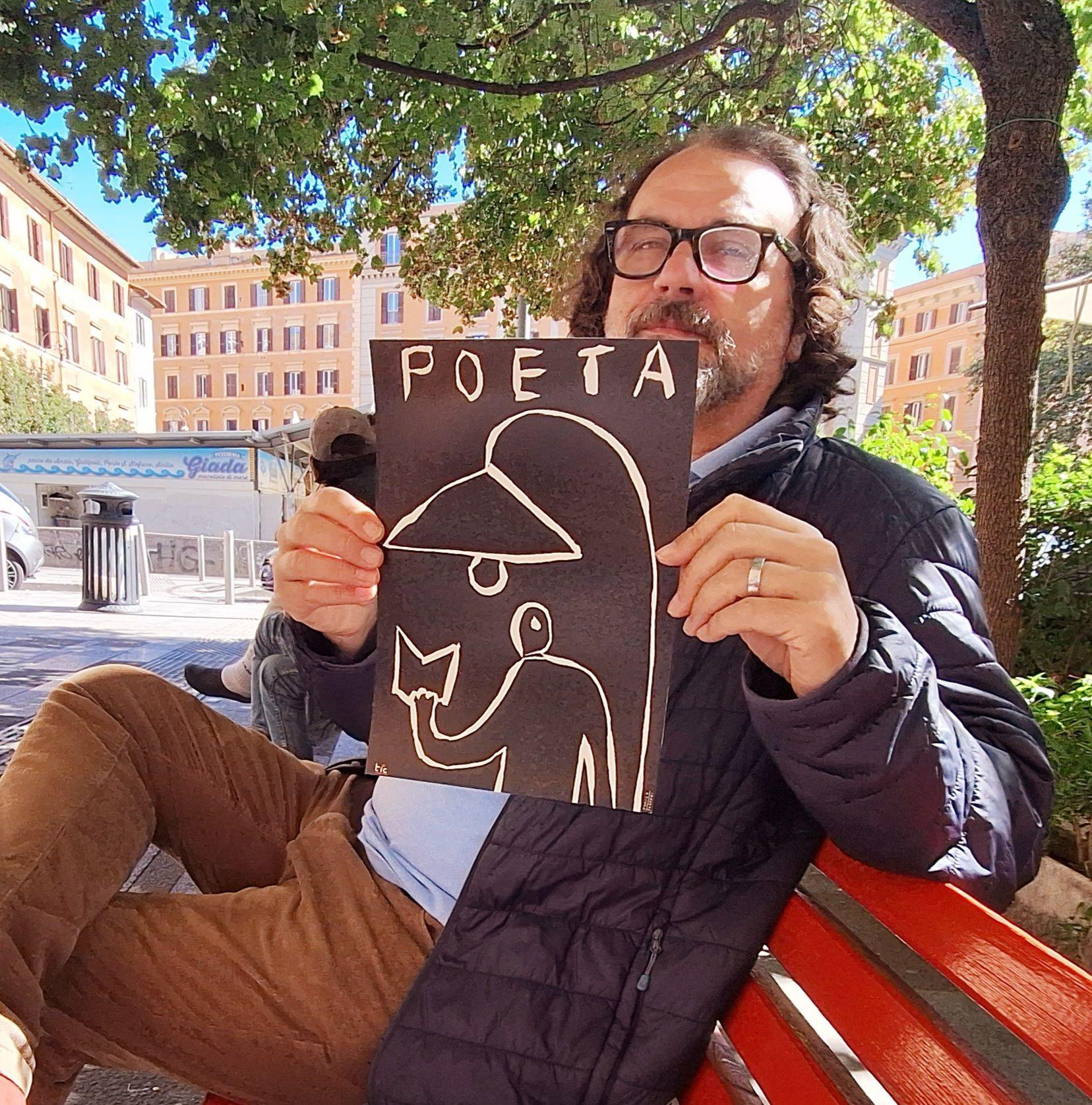
- Born: 17 November 1972; Cape Town, South Africa
- Occupations: Author, Software Developer

Tom Dreyer (born 17 November 1972) is a South African novelist and poet, writing in both English and Afrikaans.

He went to school in Stellenbosch, and studied at the University of Stellenbosch and the University of Cape Town. He is an alumnus of the International Writing Program at the University of Iowa and has been writer-in-residence at universities and institutes across the world.

He made his writing debut in the poetry anthology Nuwe Stemme (Tafelberg Publishers, 1997) and a number of his poems were subsequently included in the anthology Afrikaanse Poësie in ‘n Duisend en Enkele Gedigte (1999), compiled by Gerrit Komrij.

Dreyer has hitherto been better known for his prose work, which has been awarded or shortlisted for significant South African literary awards. His last collection of stories, Kodachrome, was published in August 2022 and has garnered rave reviews.

In 2023 his first collection of poems, Nou in infrarooi, was published. It was awarded the ATKV Poetry Prize in 2024 and was shortlisted for the UJ Prize for Afrikaans. Fanie Olivier called it "perhaps the most impressive debut of the past decade or two", while Charl-Pierre Naudé hailed it as "one of the most surprising and invigorating tours de force in the history of the Afrikaans poetry debut".

== Novels ==
- Erdvarkfontein, Tafelberg Publishers (1998)
- Stinkafrikaners, Tafelberg Publishers(2000)
- Equatoria, Tafelberg Publishers (2006)
- Dorado, Penguin Random House (2016)
- The Long Wave, Penguin Random House (2016)

== Short stories ==
- Polaroid, Tafelberg Publishers(2007)
- Kodachrome, Protea (2022)

== Poetry ==
- Nou in infrarooi, Kwela Publishers(2023)

== Awards ==
- 1998 M-Net Bursary
- 2001 Eugène Marais Prize for Stinkafrikaners
- 2007 Equatoria shortlisted for the M-Net Literary Prize
- 2017 Dorado shortlisted for the University of Johannesburg Fiction Prize (Afrikaans)
- 2017 Dorado shortlisted for the KykNet/Rapport Film Prize
- 2017 The Long Wave longlisted for the Sunday Times Literary Awards Fiction Prize
- 2019 Tom Dreyer's poem Slaap jy solank dan hou ek die fort won the Afrikaans category of the AVBOB national poetry competition.
- 2024 ATKV Poetry Prize for Nou in infrarooi
- 2024 Nou in infrarooi shortlisted for UJ Prize for Afrikaans
- 2007 Nou in infrarooi longlisted for the South African Literary Award: Poetry
