= Liza Grobler =

South African Mixed Media artist (born 1974)

- Born: 1974 (age 51–52); South Africa
- Education: Stellenbosch University
- Known for: Mixed Media

Liza Grobler (born 1974) is a South African Mixed Media artist who lives and works in Cape Town, South Africa. Grobler works in a diverse range of media, embracing bright colours and often incorporating traditional craft techniques to create site-specific work.

== Biography ==
Grobler received her master's degree in Fine Art with distinction from Stellenbosch University in 1999, after which she worked towards developing a signature aesthetic involving bright colours and diverse media. Grobler' work often incorporates traditional craft techniques such as beadwork and she has collaborated with The Quebeka Bead Studio to produce beaded works. She has participated in close to a hundred group shows both in South Africa and abroad - in Italy, Brazil, Germany, the United Kingdom, the Netherlands, Switzerland, Australia, Spain, the United States and Finland. She attended residencies and workshops in the US, Norway, Finland and Switzerland. Her work resides in many notable collections including the Jeanetta Blignaut Art Consultancy Collection. Grobler has also been an art critic and regular contributor for daily Afrikaans newspaper Die Burger. Grobler lives and works in Cape Town with her artist husband Norman O’Flynn and son, Storm.

In 2012 Grobler unveiled 'White Termite' at BRUNDYN + GONSALVES.

Grobler's work was also included in 'ALPTRAUM!', a 2011 group drawing exhibition which travelled between Cell Project Space, London; Deutscher Künstlerbund Projektraum, Berlin; The Company, Los Angeles and 'Blank Projects', Cape Town.

== Notable Collaborations ==
- Grobler collaborated with Jeanne Hoffman on the public art project, 'Afrikkan Tähti' at the Rauma Art Museum in Finland in 2007. A blog was created to document this project.
- In 2006, Grobler co-developed WASTE AT WORK – a waste minimisation business/art collaborative project - with Jeanetta Blignaut.
- Grobler co-founded Cape Town-based project space blank projects with Jonathan Garnham in 2005.
