= John Laredo =

South African anthropologist

John Epaminondas Laredo (13 February 1932 – 1 October 2000) was a South African anthropologist and anti-apartheid activist.

== Early life ==
Laredo was born in Pretoria, South Africa. He was brought up speaking Afrikaans and English, and later learned Zulu and several other languages.

In 1951, Laredo went to Stellenbosch University, followed by a master's in social anthropology at King's College, Cambridge. He returned to South Africa in 1958 with his wife Ursula Marx, lecturing in African studies at University of Cape Town. He then moved to Durban in 1959 to undertake anthropological fieldwork in kwaZulu at Natal University, where he subsequently became a sociology lecturer.

== Activism ==
John gradually became convinced that white rule was responsible for black poverty, and became active in the anti-apartheid movement. Soon after the Sharpeville massacre in 1960, John, at that time head of social anthropology at Rhodes University, Port Elizabeth, was detained and interrogated for 110 days, under the "90-day" detention clause, and then jailed for five years. Banned and house-arrested on his release, he went into exile in England. From 1970-71, he was Resident Visiting Fellow at King's. He then joined the new Bradford University's sociology department.

His marriage to Ursula Marx broke down, but in 1986 he met Ailsa Swarbrick, an Open University lecturer who had lived in Tanzania, with whom he enjoyed great happiness for the rest of his life. John suffered a heart attack in 1990, and he retired in 1993. After the end of apartheid, he and Ailsa were able to revisit South Africa, and were honoured by an invitation to lunch with President Nelson Mandela.

John Laredo died suddenly in Leeds, UK, on 1 October 2000.
