= Karlien de Villiers =

South African artist and author

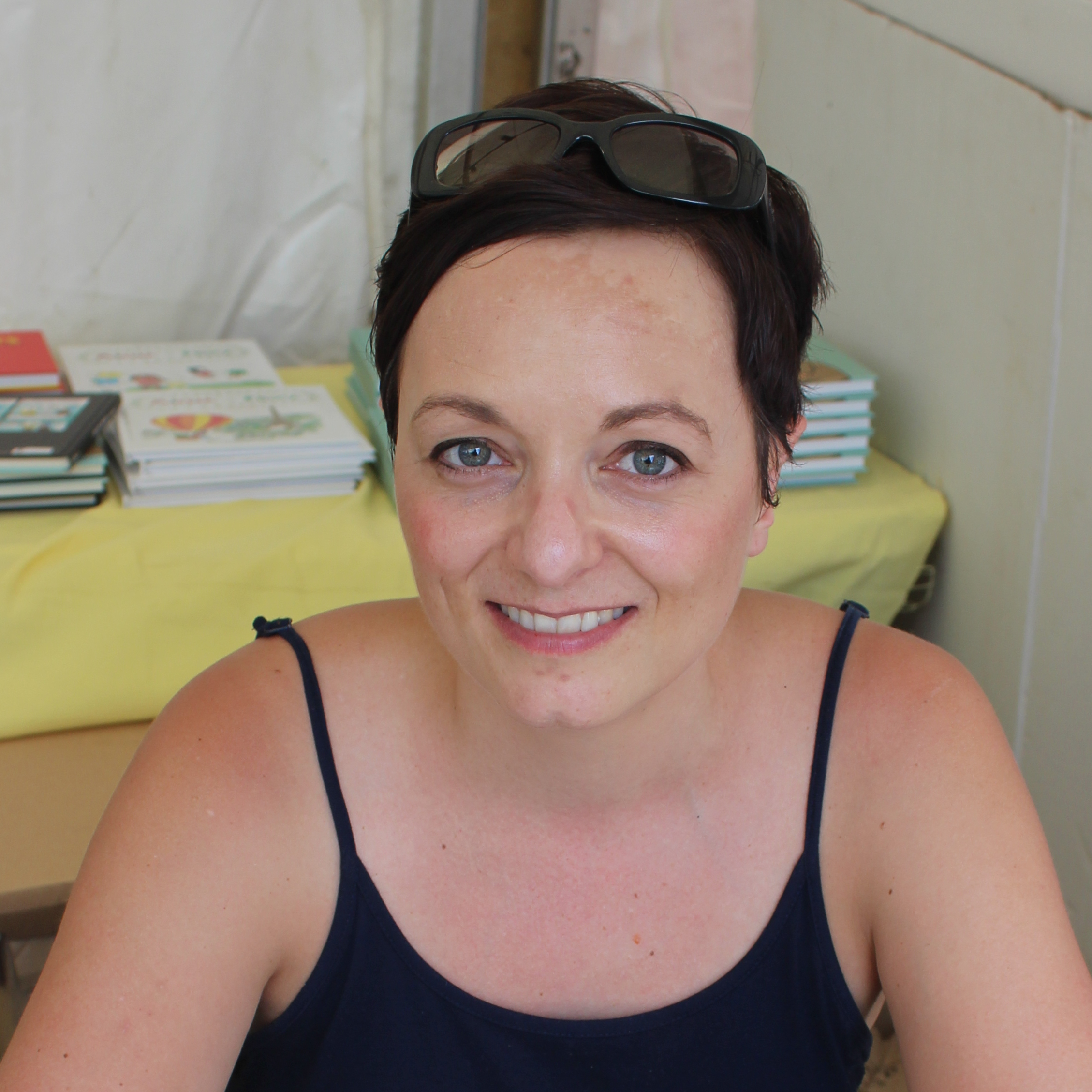
- Karlien de Villiers (Cyclone BD, Réunion, 2015)
- Born: December 22, 1975 (age 50) Cape Town, South Africa
- Area: Artist
- Notable works: My Mother was a Beautiful Woman
- Awards: UNESCO-Aschberg Bursary for Visual Arts

Karlien de Villiers (Cape Town, December 22, 1975) is a South African artist. She is the author of an autobiographical comic book entitled My Mother was a Beautiful Woman, about her childhood and the time of apartheid, seen from a white family. She has also produced several paintings and sculptures. From 2006 to 2017, she was a lecturer at the Stellenbosch University, where she herself studied drawing and illustration from 1994 to 1997. Previously, she lectured at the University of Pretoria (2003–2006). Since 2019, she has been a lecturer in Design, Illustration and Art Direction at Stellenbosch Academy of Design and Photography.

== Biography ==
Born in 1975 in Cape Town, from a white middle class background, she was not really aware of apartheid during her early childhood. “For a long time in my childhood, I didn't question a fact: that white people dominated, had the best jobs and the best schools, and laid on beaches separated from black people. Our parents told us that it was normal for all the domestic workers to be black", she explains. She was 11 when her mother died of cancer. She and her sister were sent to a boarding school and encountered other backgrounds: "in the midst of my misfortune, I discovered that I belonged to the privileged class".

After high school, she continued from 1994 in an art school at Stellenbosch University and there learned drawing and illustration from Conrad Botes and Anton Kannemeyer. They introduced her to bande dessinée European comics. She then published her drawings and childhood anecdotes in the comics magazine Bitterkomix. She graduated from Stellenbosch University in 1997, with a degree in graphic design. She worked for a short time in a design studio belonging to the Ogilvy & Mather group. After traveling abroad for some time, she moved from Cape Town to Johannesburg, then to Pretoria. She then worked as a freelance illustrator and resumed post-graduate studies at the University of Pretoria, which she finished in early 2006 (Academic Honors, Master's Degree, Information Design).

Anna Sommer, passing through South Africa, discovered De Villiers' drawings and encouraged her to publish an album, recommending a publisher. This resulted in an autobiographical comic book, first published in Switzerland (in German), titled Meine Mutter war eine Schöne Frau (My mother was a very beautiful woman), about her childhood memories, relationships with her sister, her parents' separation, and the apartheid era, told from the perspective of a white family in South Africa at the time.

Continuing as an artist, making paintings and sculptures, she has also worked as an illustrator for children's literature, and as a lecturer in her initial art school at the Stellenbosch University.

== Awards and honours ==
- 2011, UNESCO-Aschberg Bursary for Visual Arts
- 2011, Top 20 Finalist: Sovereign Art Foundation African Art Prize
- 2002, National Arts Council Grant
- 2001, National Research Foundation Research Grant
- 2001, University of Pretoria Academic Merit Bursary
- 1997, Best Final Year Student in Design, Stellenbosch University
- 1997, Best Final Year Student Graphic Design+Illustration, Stellenbosch University

== Selected works ==
- My Mother was a Beautiful Woman (2006)
