= Novel Njweipi Chegou =

Molecular biologist and academic

- Born: Cameroon
- Education: Stellenbosch University; University of Buea
- Scientific career
- Workplaces: Stellenbosch University

Novel Njweipi Chegou is a Cameroonian molecular biologist who is a professor at the Stellenbosch University Immunology Research Group. His research considers pulmonary and extrapulmonary tuberculosis. He leads the Diagnostics Research Laboratory. He was awarded the Royal Society Africa Prize in 2022.

== Early life and education ==
Chegou is from the Anglophone region of Cameroon. He studied medical sciences at the University of Buea and then started a degree in health sciences at Stellenbosch University. His master's research considered the immunology of tuberculosis, and he continued in the field for his doctoral research. His doctoral research identified and patented a QuantiFERON supernatant biosignature that can differentiate between active and latent Mycobacterium tuberculosis.

== Research and career ==
Chegou looks to develop a testing platform for tuberculosis. He has investigated different biomarkers of tuberculosis, and developed a strategy to identify tuberculosis meningitis in children and in places with limited access to resources, such as rural areas.

== Awards and honours ==
- 2015 Stellenbosch University Rector's Award
- 2015 UNESCO-MARS award
- 2019 South African Medical Research Council Silver award
- 2019 NSTF-South32 Awards
- 2022 Royal Society Africa Prize

== Selected publications ==
- Daniel E Zak; Adam Penn-Nicholson; Thomas J Scriba; et al. (23 March 2016). "A blood RNA signature for tuberculosis disease risk: a prospective cohort study". The Lancet. 387 (10035): 2312–2322. doi:10.1016/s0140-6736(15)01316-1. ISSN 0140-6736. PMC 5392204. PMID 27017310. Wikidata Q33566308.
- Gerhard Walzl; Ruth McNerney; Nelita Du Plessis; Matthew Bates; Timothy D McHugh; Novel N Chegou; Alimuddin Zumla (23 March 2018). "Tuberculosis: advances and challenges in development of new diagnostics and biomarkers". Lancet Infectious Diseases. 18 (7): e199–e210. doi:10.1016/s1473-3099(18)30111-7. ISSN 1473-3099. PMID 29580818. Wikidata Q52629916.
- Novel N Chegou; Gillian F Black; Martin Kidd; Paul D van Helden; Gerhard Walzl (16 May 2009). "Host markers in QuantiFERON supernatants differentiate active TB from latent TB infection: preliminary report". BMC Pulmonary Medicine. 9: 21. doi:10.1186/1471-2466-9-21. ISSN 1471-2466. PMC 2696407. PMID 19445695. Wikidata Q37227589.
