= Riana Scheepers =

Afrikaans author

Riana Scheepers (born 9 December 1957) is a South African author. She writes children's books, short fiction, and poetry, all in the Afrikaans language.

She received her PhD from the University of Cape Town.
