= Jannie Mouton =

South African businessman

- Born: 1946 (age 79–80); Carnarvon, South Africa
- Education: Stellenbosch University
- Occupation: Businessman
- Known for: Founder, PSG Group; Co-founder, Capitec Bank
- Spouse(s): Dana Mouton (died 2004); Deidré Mouton
- Children: 3
- Website: www.psggroup.co.za

Johannes "Jannie" Mouton (born 1946) is a South African businessman, the founder of PSG Group.

== Early life and education ==
Mouton was born in Carnarvon in 1946, and grew up there. He matriculated in 1964. He studied for his BCom (Hons) degree at the University of Stellenbosch, did his articles at Coopers Brothers (now PricewaterhouseCoopers) and qualified as a chartered accountant in 1973.

== Career ==
Mouton started working as an accountant at Federale Volksbeleggings in 1973. He also worked for Veka and Kanhym. In 1982 he co-founded the broking firm Senekal, Mouton & Kitshoff. In 1987 he became the managing director and was fired in 1995 at the age of 48. In the same year he and business partner Chris Otto gained control of PAG Limited, which later morphed into PSG Group.

== Career highlights ==
Years ago the business website Moneyweb dubbed Jannie Mouton “The Boere-Buffet”. The main reason was his success, with his team, with PSG Group, a diversified investment company. They identified undervalued assets and focused on the creation of long-term value. The business interests spanned financial services, manufacturing, mining, agriculture, property and renewable energy. Over the years, PSG Group has contributed to building great businesses such as Capitec, which has shot out the lights across the South African business landscape: Mouton and Otto saw what microlending could bring to the table when this was still a precarious industry. Other success stories were PSG Konsult (now PSG Financial Services), Curro and Stadio. The agri-businesses Zeder was a powerhouse. So was Paladin Capital. PSG Group started MiWay Insurance with Rene Otto in 2007. The list of the group’s involvement in various industries at one stage or another goes on: Propel, PSG Capital, PSG Fund Management, PSG Futurewealth, Agricol, BKB, Capespan, Capevin, Kaap Agri, Pioneer Foods, KLK Landbou, MGK, NWK, Suidwes Investments, Tuinroete Agri, African Unity Insurance, Erbacon, GRW, Petmin, Precrete, Protea Foundry, Top Fix Holdings, Thembeka Capital, Access Freight Logistics, Bontebok Limeworks, Greymatter & Finch, JSE Limited, Overberg Agri, Spirit Capital and VMS Group.

== Legacy ==
On 2 March 2022 Adriaan Kruger of Moneyweb wrote: “Starting from nothing in 1995, a handful of businessmen built companies worth more than R280 billion.” He went on to say with the large-scale unbundling of among others the Capitec interests, “It’s sad to see PSG Group disappear.” Piet Mouton, currently (2025) chairman of PSG Group, explained to Kruger that their investment business model had become old-fashioned worldwide. In February 2025 the unbundled PSG Financial Services reported net profit of R1.38 billion, with assets under management of R470.7 billion (according to psg.co.za). This meant that the Mouton family was back on the Forbes list of wealthiest people in the world, with assets of R29,2 billion. The Mouton family still has an 87% interest in the unlisted PSG Group. PSG Group continues as an incubator to build businesses and generate shareholder returns.

== Personal life ==
His first wife, Dana (née Olivier) Mouton died in 2004. He married widower Deidré (née De Villiers) Uys in 2010. Mouton has two sons, Jan and Piet, and a daughter, Charité. He lives in Stellenbosch, South Africa. His son Piet is the Chairman of PSG Group. His eldest son, Jan, managed the PSG Flexible Fund and is a non-executive director of PSG. In May 2018, Mouton revealed that he had been diagnosed with early-stage dementia and would be stepping down as PSG Chairman. He also stepped back from public life.

== Controversy ==
Mouton did not shy away from controversy during his career. Earlier, he was friends with (the late) businessman Markus Jooste. Jooste facilitated Steinhoff’s 25% investment in PSG, which assisted Mouton in warding off a hostile bid from ABSA bank. But Mouton broke all ties with him when the Steinhoff scandal broke late in 2017. Regarding the wine company KWV, he was accused of not respecting the business and tampering with a holy cow. PSG sold its stake in 2011.

== Philanthropy ==
In 2016 Jannie Mouton bequeathed R50 million for the Jan Mouton Centre of Learning at Stellenbosch University, named after his father. In 2017 he founded the Jannie Mouton Stigting (Afrikaans for foundation) with 10,5 million PSG shares. Since then the foundation has paid out dividends of R100 million to more than 100 welfare organisations such as children’s homes, soup kitchens and support for the disabled. On 27 August 2025 the Jannie Mouton Stigting announced that it will repurpose the largest share of its capital, R7.2 billion, to buy out shareholders of the private school group Curro. This will be in pursuit of quality education for children from disadvantaged backgrounds. The foundation believes it is the biggest single philanthropic gesture in the history of South Africa.

== Works ==
Jannie Mouton: And then they fired me, as told to Carié Maas. It was published in 2011 by Tafelberg; also in Afrikaans as Jannie Mouton: En toe fire hulle my.
