= James Barnard =

American-Canadian engineer

- Born: James Laing Barnard; June 6, 1935; Bellville, Western Cape, South Africa
- Died: January 27, 2026 (aged 90); Leawood, Kansas, United States
- Education: University of Stellenbosch; University of Pretoria; Vanderbilt University; University of Texas
- Occupations: Water & Environmental Engineer

James Laing Barnard (June 6, 1935 – January 27, 2026) was a South African born engineer living in the United States who is known globally as the pioneer of biological nutrient removal (BNR), a non-chemical means of water treatment to remove nitrogen and phosphorus from used water.

Barnard was elected as a member into the National Academy of Engineering in 2021 for the development and implementation of biological nutrient removal in water treatment.

== Early life and education ==
Barnard was born in Bellville, a suburb of Cape Town, South Africa, on June 6, 1935, to farmers Jacobus and Dorothea (née Everts) Barnard. He was one of eight children. His family said he was a second cousin of Dr. Christiaan Barnard, who performed the first human heart transplant.

Barnard received a bachelor's degree in civil engineering from Stellenbosch University in 1956, a bachelor of science degree from the University of Pretoria, a master's in environmental engineering from the University of Texas at Austin in 1969, and a doctorate in water resources and environmental health engineering from Vanderbilt University in 1971.

== Career ==
Barnard was recognized internationally for developing the BARDENPHO Process (BARnard DENitrification and PHOsphorus removal), Phoredox (later AO and A2O), the Modified Balakrishnan/Eckenfelder (later called the MLE) process and the Westbank Process. In 1998 he joined the engineering firm Black & Veatch in suburban Kansas City, where he was Global Practice and Technology Leader. He retired in 2024.

Barnard has done process design for more than 140 nutrient removal plants and extensions around the world, and introduced biological nutrient removal to North America with the design of the Palmetto plant in Florida and the Kelowna plant in British Columbia for nitrogen and phosphorus removal. Most designs for high efficiency nitrogen removal in the USA are now based on these models.

He served as External Examiner for Ph.D. candidates from the Universities of Cape Town, Pretoria, British Columbia, Queensland, Manitoba, Purdue and Stavanger in Norway. He also served as adjunct professor at the University of British Columbia and taught courses in biological nutrient removal at the University of Queensland Winter School for ten consecutive years.

== Awards and accolades ==
Barnard was awarded the Camp Medal from the Water Environment Federation (WEF), the Imhoff/Koch award of the International Water Association and the Clarke Prize of the National Water Research Institute. He was elected as a Distinguished Member of the American Society of Civil Engineers, a Fellow of WEF and was the recipient of the Lee Kuan Yew Water Prize at Singapore International Water Week in 2011. Barnard has been awarded Honorary Doctorates from the University of Johannesburg, Stellenbosch University and the Iowa State University. He was a member of the Distinguished Group of Professionals of the International Water Association and has received a Gold Medal from the South African Academy of Science and Arts. Barnard was also a member of the National Academy of Engineering (2021).

== Personal life and death ==
Barnard married Maryna Minnaar in 1963, and had a daughter. He died at the age of 90 in Leawood, Kansas, a suburb of Kansas City, Missouri, on January 27, 2026.
