= Edrich Lubbe =

Edrich Lubbe may refer to:

- Edrich Lubbe (cricketer), born 1993, South African cricketer
- Edrich Lubbe (rugby union), born 1969, South African international rugby union player
