= Ntsiki Biyela =

South African winemaker and businesswoman

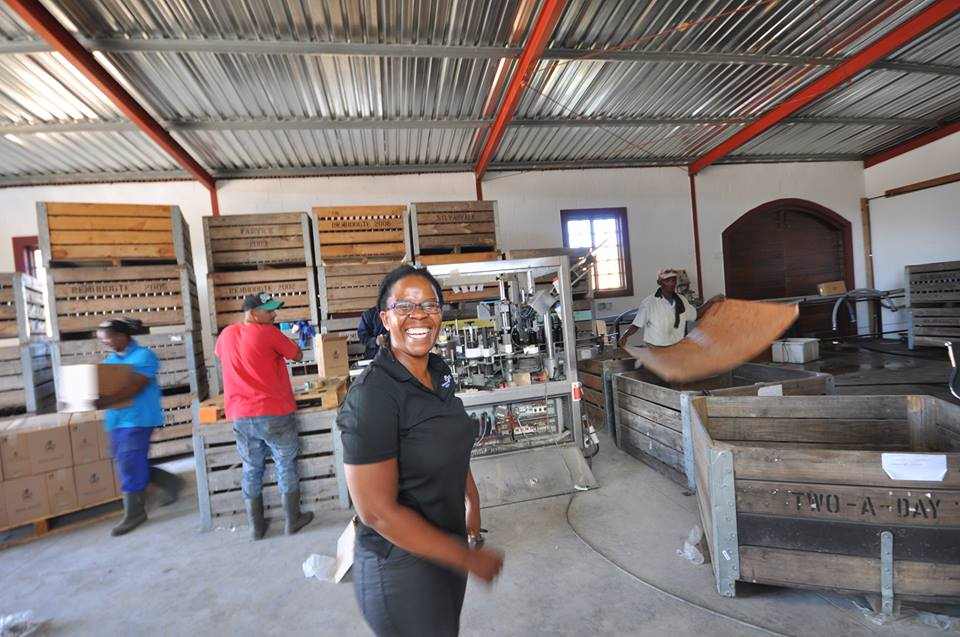
- Born: 1978 (age 47–48); KwaZulu-Natal, South Africa
- Education: Stellenbosch University
- Occupation: winemaker
- Years active: 2004–present

Ntsiki Biyela (born 1978) is a South African winemaker and businesswoman who runs Aslina wines. Previously, she was head winemaker at Stellekaya Wines, where Biyela became the first black female winemaker in South Africa.

== Biography ==
Biyela grew up in Mahlabathini in Zululand. She graduated from high school in 1996 and worked for a year as a domestic worker. Having made a number of unsuccessful grant applications to study at university, she was offered the opportunity to study viticulture and oenology at Stellenbosch University in 1998 by South African Airways, who were providing a number of wine making scholarships. She was able to attend university on a full scholarship and graduated in 2003 with a bachelor of science in agriculture.

Biyela had never tasted wine prior to starting her studies, but soon came to love what she describes as "the ever-changing content of wine." Her lectures were primarily delivered in Afrikaans, which she did not speak, so Biyela learnt the majority of the winemaking content via English notes. Other students asked her why she'd wanted to study there, which Biyela interpreted as having the underlying meaning "you're not welcome." She was also able to get a part-time job at local winery Delheim.

In 2009 Biyela was named as South Africa’s Woman Winemaker of the Year.

Biyela saw Black South Africans, who weren't being courted by White South African winemakers because they weren't traditional wine drinkers, as a huge untapped potential consumer base. The flavor references commonly used to describe wine are often unfamiliar flavors to those "not well-versed in European winespeak". Biyela describes her wines using familiar flavors, such as describing a wine as having an aroma similar to amasi, a local fermented milk product, rather than calling its aroma similar to truffles.

Biyela is a board member of Pinotage Youth Development Academy, which provides training for youth in the Cape Winelands region to prepare them to enter the industry.

== Stellekaya Wines ==
After graduating from Stellenbosch University, Biyela was hired as winemaker for Stellekaya Wines in 2004, making her the first black female winemaker in South Africa. Her first red wine won a gold medal at the Michelangelo awards.

In 2016 Biyela announced that she planned to leave Stellekaya and start her own brand of wine later in the year.

== Aslina Wines ==
In 2017, Biyela launched Aslina wines, a self-funded wine business. Biyela planned to use grapes from local vineyards, as she did not have the capital to invest in her own vineyard. She found interacting with growers sometimes difficult at first because they assumed that since she was Black, she didn't know anything about wine.

Four varietals were planned, including Chardonnay, Sauvignon Blanc, Cabernet Sauvignon and a Bordeaux blend echoing her 2014 collaboration with California winemaker Helen Keplinger, which was created for Mika Bulmash's Wine for the World program.
