= Centre for Conflict Resolution =

South African research institute

The Centre for Conflict Resolution is a social research institute of the University of Cape Town.

It was founded in 1968 by Professor H.W. van der Merwe in Cape Town, South Africa, to conduct academic research on relations between "racial" groups, with the goal of promoting mutual acceptance and co-operation.

Initially named the Abe Bailey Institute for Inter-Racial Studies after the original funding organisation, the Abe Bailey Trust, the Institute was renamed the Centre for Intergroup Studies in 1973.

During the 1980s this organization was attempting to address conflict resolution resulting from the South African policy of apartheid.

Since 1990 the Centre is known as the Centre for Conflict Resolution.

The Centre is currently housed in the Coornhoop, a 17th century farmhouse at 2 Dixton Road in Observatory, Cape Town.
