= Wim de Villiers =

South African doctor

professor Wim de Villiers

Rector and Vice-Chancellor Stellenbosch University
- In office 29 April 2015 – 1 April 2025
- Preceded by: Russel Botman
- Succeeded by: Deresh Ramjugernath

Dean of the Faculty of Health Sciences at the University of Cape Town
- In office 2013–2014

Personal details
- Education: Stellenbosch University; Harvard University; University of Oxford

Willem "Wim" Johan Simon de Villiers (born 1959) is a South African doctor and served as the 12th rector and vice-chancellor of Stellenbosch University.

He succeeded Russel Botman after the latter died suddenly of a heart attack in 2014.

De Villiers was previously the Dean of the Faculty of Health Sciences at the University of Cape Town.

He is a board member of the Academy of Science of South Africa.

== Life ==
After obtaining his medical degree, De Villiers moved to England, where he obtained a doctorate in immunology from the University of Oxford in 1995. He then moved to the United States where he worked as a gastroenterologist. He also held numerous senior positions at the University of Kentucky, including chief of gastroenterology.

He also earned a master's degree in health care management from Harvard University.

== Controversy ==
=== Language policy at Stellenbosch University ===
Wim de Villiers formed a management team in 2015 to resolve the language issue on behalf of the university. The management team decides that all teaching at Stellenbosch University will be facilitated in English and that substantial academic support will be made available in other South African languages according to students' needs.

In 2017, the university became one of four South African universities to abolish Afrikaans as a language of instruction. De Villiers is in favor of expanding the use of English to more than 50% to attract more international students and lecturers.

On 6 August 2017, Netwerk24 reported that court documents were submitted to the High Court in Cape Town alleging that De Villiers deliberately misled the council of Stellenbosch University in his fight to remove Afrikaans as a language of instruction at the university acquire.

=== Edwin Cameron ===
In October 2019, the Democratic Alliance called for an independent investigation into De Villiers' alleged attempts to bribe Judge Edwin Cameron by offering Cameron the chancellorship in exchange for a decision in the Constitutional Court of South Africa in favor of Stellenbosch University's policy to abolish Afrikaans as a language of instruction. De Villiers denies that he could have influenced the election of Edwin Cameron as chancellor. An investigation cleared De Villiers of any blame.

=== Nepotism ===
In 2023, Vice-Chancellor Wim de Villiers was charged of nepotism. He allegedly used his discretionary right to secure a place for his wife's nephew at the university's medical school. An investigation into the case found that there was no misconduct that warranted his removal from office but that he would have to face financial consequences.

=== Fraud accusations ===
On Sunday 27 October 2024, Edwin Cameron accused Wim De Villiers of fraud involving the report on Wilgenhof residence.
