= Deresh Ramjugernath =

Vice-Chancellor and Rector of Stellenbosch University

Deresh Ramjugernath FAAS
- Education: University of KwaZulu-Natal
- Awards: President’s Award, NRF; President’s Award, NSTF; Vice-Chancellor's Research Award, University of KwaZulu-Natal
- Scientific career
- Fields: Thermodynamics
- Institutions: Stellenbosch University; University of KwaZulu-Natal

Deresh Ramjugernath FAAS is a South African professor of Engineering. He was the Deputy Vice-Chancellor of Research at the University of KwaZulu-Natal (UKZN) and is the current Rector and Vice-Chancellor of Stellenbosch University.

== Education and Background ==
Ramjugernath completed all of his studies at the University of KwaZulu-Natal. He first obtained a degree in BSc in Chemical Engineering in 1993, followed by an MSc in 1995, and a Ph.D. in Chemical Engineering in 2000. In 2026 he received an Honorary Doctorate in Education from Coventry University. Ramjugernath resides in Stellenbosch with his wife Professor Prathieka Naidoo, and their three daughters.

== Career and research ==
Ramjugernath became a professor of chemical engineering at the age of 31 at the University of KwaZulu-Natal. In 2007, he became the Assistant Dean of Research and Postgraduate Studies at the Faculty of Engineering of the same University. He also served as the Deputy Vice-Chancellor of Research and Pro Vice-Chancellor of Innovation, Commercialization, and Entrepreneurship before he was appointed as the deputy Vice-Chancellor of Learning and Teaching at the Stellenbosch University.

Ramjugernath research centered around Thermodynamics / Separation including high-pressure vapor-liquid equilibria, low-pressure vapor-liquid equilibria, liquid-liquid equilibria, phase equilibria with chemical reaction, pyrolysis, high-temperature thermodynamics, gas hydrate separation, and high-pressure plasma reactors.

== Awards and honours ==
Ramjugernath was elected a Fellow of the Academy of Sciences of South Africa, the African Academy of Sciences since 2015, and a Fellow of the South African Academy of Engineering.

He received the President’s Award from the National Research Foundation (NRF), and the National Science and Technology Forum (NSTF), South Africa. He was also the recipient of Vice-Chancellor's Research Award from the University of KwaZulu-Natal.

== Selected publications ==
- Eslamimanesh, Ali; Mohammadi, Amir H.; Richon, Dominique; Naidoo, Paramespri; Ramjugernath, Deresh (2012-03-01). Application of gas hydrate formation in separation processes: A review of experimental studies. The Journal of Chemical Thermodynamics. Thermodynamics of Sustainable Processes. 46: 62–71. doi:10.1016/j.jct.2011.10.006. ISSN 0021-9614.
- Nannoolal, Yash; Rarey, Jürgen; Ramjugernath, Deresh; Cordes, Wilfried (2004-12-10). Estimation of pure component properties: Part 1. Estimation of the normal boiling point of non-electrolyte organic compounds via group contributions and group interactions. Fluid Phase Equilibria. 226: 45–63. doi:10.1016/j.fluid.2004.09.001. ISSN 0378-3812.
- Nannoolal, Yash; Rarey, Jürgen; Ramjugernath, Deresh (2008-07-25). Estimation of pure component properties: Part 3. Estimation of the vapor pressure of non-electrolyte organic compounds via group contributions and group interactions. Fluid Phase Equilibria. 269 (1): 117–133. doi:10.1016/j.fluid.2008.04.020. ISSN 0378-3812.
- Letcher, Trevor M.; Soko, Bathebele; Ramjugernath, Deresh; Deenadayalu, Nirmala; Nevines, Ashley; Naicker, Pavan K. (2003-03-18). Activity Coefficients at Infinite Dilution of Organic Solutes in 1-Hexyl-3-methylimidazolium Hexafluorophosphate from Gas−Liquid Chromatography. Journal of Chemical & Engineering Data. 48 (3): 708–711. doi:10.1021/je0256481. ISSN 0021-9568.
