= Leopoldt van Huyssteen =

Leopoldt van Huyssteen was the acting Rector and Vice-Chancellor of Stellenbosch University, South Africa, following the unexpected death of the previous office bearer Prof Russel Botman on 28 June 2014. Prof Wim de Villiers was appointed to the position permanently at the end of 2014.

== Career ==
Before his appointment as acting rector and vice-chancellor Van Huyssteen was Chief Operating Officer and previously Dean of the Faculty of AgriSciences as well as acting Vice-Rector (Research).

== Interests ==
His special interests include project management, change management, technology transfer and innovation, gardening, camping and reading. Prof Van Huyssteen's professional interests during his research career have included soil management, root growth, soil compaction, soil tillage implements and general viticulture. He has published widely on these subjects and attended several international congresses, some as an invited speaker.
