= Whitey Basson =

South African businessman (born 1946)

- Born: James Wellwood Basson; 8 January 1946 (age 80); Porterville, Western Cape, South Africa
- Education: Stellenbosch University
- Occupation: Businessman
- Title: CEO, Shoprite
- Term: 1971 to 2016
- Successor: P.C. Engelbrecht
- Board member of: Shoprite Holdings; Clover South Africa
- Children: 4

James Wellwood "Whitey" Basson (born 8 January 1946) is a South African businessman and billionaire who was largely responsible for growing a small business called Shoprite from an 8-store chain valued at R1 million into an international retail conglomerate with revenue in 2019 of R150 billion, market capitalisation of R114 billion, more than 2 300 stores and 140 000 employees across 15 African countries. Deloitte's Global Powers of Retailing 2019 ranked The Shoprite Group as the 86th largest retailer in the world.

Basson retired as the managing director and Chief Executive of Shoprite Holdings Ltd on 31 December 2016.

== Early life ==
Basson was born on 8 January 1946 on the family farm Dasbosch in the Porterville, Western Cape district to Jack and Maude Basson. He was one of three children.

When asked in an interview with Bruce Whitfield about the origin of his nickname, "Whitey", Basson said that his given names, James Wellwood, "came from a Scottish gentleman who didn't have any children and my father decided to name me after him... and it didn't go well in Porterville, so they had to find a shorter name. So I think they kept a 'W' for 'Whitey'... I had, those days blond hair not white hair, but they didn't know the difference at that stage in Porterville."

He went to school in Porterville and completed his secondary schooling at Rondebosch Boys' High School in Cape Town, where he matriculated in 1963. Basson first considered studying medicine. "I wanted to become a medical student, but my mother said I was afraid of blood, so I didn't." Basson said, "I actually got admitted to UCT, but I never went there."

He attained his BCom CTA from Stellenbosch University and completed his CA(SA) in 1970 after his articles at ER Syfret & Co (now Ernst & Young). Whilst studying at Stellenbosch he stayed in the Wilgenhof Men's Residence. He then went to work at Brink, Roos & Du Toit (now PricewaterhouseCoopers) and from mid-1970 and in 1971 he practised as a chartered accountant.

== Career ==
=== Pep Stores Ltd ===
In 1971 Basson was approached by Renier van Rooyen, who was married to a cousin of Christo Wiese, to become the financial director of the retail clothing chain that van Rooyen had founded called Pep Stores Ltd (or as it was locally known "Pep"). Van Rooyen was planning to list the company on the JSE as Pepkor. Basson agreed to join the company as financial director and in 1974 became head of operations. "At the tender age of 28 I should become the business director, or whatever we called it in those days," Basson said. In 1974 he was appointed to the board and remained a member until 2004.

By 1981, Pep had grown to 500 stores, 10 factories, 12 000 employees and a turnover of close to R300 million. At this point Christo Wiese bought out van Rooyen's holdings in Pepkor and became the major shareholder. Wiese became the chairman of Pepkor. In 2014 Wiese sold Pepkor to Steinhoff International in exchange for about 20% of Steinhoff's issued shares.

=== Half Price Group ===
One of the competitors to Pep in South Africa was the Half Price Group, managed by Sam Stupple. Stupple was in regular contact with Basson regarding the sales figures of the Pep stores and Basson realised that his sales figures were being leaked to Stupple. In retaliation Basson thought: "I'll catch him and I sent out a circular that we get into food and then he started applying for food licences!" This led the Half Price Group into financial trouble and Basson bought them out as his first major acquisition.

=== Shoprite ===
In 1979 Basson wanted to move to trading fast-moving consumer goods and he reached an agreement with the board of Pep Stores which allowed him to either actively identify opportunities for acquisition of a food retailer or to start a new venture in food retailing. He found a small eight-store grocery chain in the Western Cape called Shoprite, still owned by the founding Geller and Rogut families, which he then acquired. "Barney Rogut was also fantastic to teach me food and he then taught me how to run a supermarket," said Basson.

Basson restructured Shoprite to optimise its growth by focusing on the largest economically active segment of South Africa's population, the middle-to-lower LSM market. Acquisitions and turnarounds of struggling companies also became a priority.

In 1986, Shoprite was listed on the JSE although its net asset value was the R1 million paid for the original eight stores and any accumulated profits. In 2019 Shoprite had secondary listings on the Namibian stock exchange (since 2002) and Zambian stock exchange (since 2003).

Under Basson's leadership, from 2010 Shoprite had become the single biggest South African grocery retailer with 34% market share.

In 2019 Shoprite had revenue of R150 billion, market capitalisation of R114 billion, more than 2 300 stores and 140 000 employees across 15 African countries. Deloitte's Global Powers of Retailing 2019 survey (covering the 2017 financial year) ranked The Shoprite Group as the 86th largest retailer in the world.

=== Ackermans ===
In 1984, Basson's first acquisition was the six Ackermans food stores, which at that point were owned by the Edgars Group. This was the company's entry point into the rural market. Basson and Raymond Ackerman (whose father had started Ackermans) were rivals and crossed paths for decades. Basson bought the food business at Ackermans food stores in the 1980s. Ackerman had run Checkers and had "so famously got fired from" it and had then gone and started Pick n Pay.

=== Grand Bazaars ===
In 1990 Basson approached Carlos Dos Santos and bought Grand Bazaars at what was considered an even better price than the original deal.

Basson said, "I walked through his fridges one day and I saw, but some of the fridges are switched off. They only stocked Coke and some of Gerald's cooldrinks, which didn't need cooling. So I phoned him and said, 'Carlos, I see you're a bit short of money. Can't we talk about your Grand Bazaars?' And he says come and see me in Jo'burg. So we did a handshake deal and that was it. I'm not sure, but I think we paid slightly less than what he paid."

=== Checkers Stores ===
By 1998 Shoprite had branches in the remote North West and Mpumalanga provinces but was still considered too small to be competition to South Africa's major supermarket chains, Pick n Pay Stores, OK Bazaars and Checkers.

However, Checkers was falling into financial difficulties. It had 169 stores and was making losses that equalled Shoprite's turnover and more than 16 000 jobs were at stake. Shoprite came to dominate the Western Cape market and approached Checkers on two occasions. On the first occasion the owners of Checkers "held unrealistic perceptions of the value of unfocussed and inefficient retail stores," according to Basson. "It was never a bad business. It was badly focussed as it could have been."

On the second occasion a deal was struck, with the aid of Basson's personal relationship with the chairman of Sanlam, Marinus Darling, that resulted in a reverse listing of Shoprite into Checkers' holding company as Shoprite Checkers Group. It took Basson nine months to revive Checkers' fortunes.

Checkers "had different cultural sort of backgrounds too," said Basson. "And when I got to Checkers it was fantastic, because they said that about 1 o'clock I have to have lunch in this beautiful dining room with waiters with white gloves. It was very nice... different three courses and everything. And I looked at the people round the table and I said 'You know guys we're losing 45 million rands a year. This lunch is in conflict with what I think we should be making and where we should be going.' And I said, 'Did you guys hear of the last supper? Well this is the last lunch', and we didn't have a lunch there again."

The addition of Checkers brought the Shoprite Checkers Group to 241 stores with enough clout to compete for better rates in the modern shopping centres that were being developed in South Africa at that time. "In fact, a lot of the landlords didn't want us in the supermarkets," Basson said. "The landlords started taking us seriously at the stage when we bought Checkers, because they didn't have too many options left."

"They are not the easiest people to deal with," says Stephan le Roux of property management company Growthpoint. "They are hard negotiators. I like working with this client. There are arguments along the way, but they play open cards."

There was some criticism by financial analysts of the continued trading under two brand names but Basson saw it as target market segmentation.

=== Ok Bazaars ===
The OK brand was created in Eloff Street, Johannesburg in 1927 but by 1997 the fortunes of OK Bazaars had waned to such an extent that the sole shareholder, SA Breweries, disposed of its stake in OK Bazaars to Shoprite for R1, despite the market cap of OK Bazaars being much larger than that of Shoprite. The deal gave Shoprite 139 'OK' stores, 18 'Hyperamas' and 21 'House & Homes' and saved 14 000 jobs.

Basson returned OK Bazaars to profitability by focusing store brands in particular areas and markets: 'OK Bazaars' were turned into OK franchises; 'OK Furniture' and 'House and Home' were consolidated into 'OK Furniture'; 'Hyperama' stores became 'Checkers Hyper' and more than 150 food stores were modernised.

=== Pick n Pay ===
During 2001, Basson devised a strategy to reposition the Checker's brand as close as possible to its higher LSM major rival, Pick n Pay. The Shoprite stores would then be focussed on the middle LSM's and a new chain called USave was created to focus on the lowest LSM's. USave had a cost structure that would allow it to reduce its gross margin by 50% while still offering good return on investment.

This repositioning resulted in the Shoprite Checkers Group growing to almost 30% market share of the South African formal retail food market.

=== International ===
Basson dreamt of expanding Shoprite across the African continent. In 1995, the first Shoprite was opened in Lusaka, Zambia. In 2019 the group had stores in Angola, Botswana, Democratic Republic of Congo, Ghana, Kenya, Lesotho, Madagascar, Malawi, Mozambique, Namibia, Nigeria, South Africa, Eswatini, Uganda and Zambia. Stores in Egypt, India and Tanzania were not successful and had to be closed down.

== Awards ==
- 2010 - DComm (honoris causa) awarded by Stellenbosch University.
- 2016 - Pioneer Award "for contribution to the industry" from the SA Council of Shopping Centres

== Retirement ==
Basson retired as the managing director and Chief Executive of Shoprite Holdings Ltd on 31 December 2016. Following his retirement, Basson served for nine months on the Shoprite Holdings board as non-executive vice-chairman to ensure an orderly leadership transition. He was succeeded by Pieter Engelbrecht, former chief operating officer.

Basson's salary for 2016 was R100,1 million including a R50 million bonus. This was the subject of a protest action by COSATU on World Day for Decent Work 2016.

On 5 May 2017, Shoprite announced that Basson was selling 8,58 million Shoprite shares with a value of R1,8 billion rands which the company was obliged to purchase in terms of an employment agreement completed in 2003. This figure represented less than 2% of the value of Shoprite. "I have no ambition to buy a big yacht or have a second wife or move the money out of the country," Basson said.

Basson remains active in other business activities. In 2017 he was appointed as one of the independent, non-executive directors of Clover South Africa.

== Personal life ==
Basson lives with his family on Klein DasBosch wine estate on the banks of the Blaauwklippen River in the Western Cape. In 2004 he participated in the Ice Bucket Challenge and donated R100 000 worth of boerewors to schools for them to use in fundraising events. "We need to create jobs in South Africa ... but I also believe we need to teach our children how to be entrepreneurs and create more jobs from a young age", Basson said.

== Quotes ==
- On delivery: "Food retailers will be safe for now, in my view, because of the complexity of delivery. But everything delivered from a warehouse will be under threat because of technology."
- On shopping malls: "The problem with retail is that the world it operates in is changing and leads to fewer square metres being needed for retail. I think the shopping centres that focus on entertainment will do better."
- On developing a business in Africa: "The sluggish pace of property development in Africa and the lack of suitable anchor tenant sites can create significant hurdles to any expansion plans."

Business positions
Preceded by New Position	CEO of Shoprite, Whitey Basson; 1975 – 2016	Succeeded by P.C. Engelbrecht
