= Praveen Linga =

Chemical engineering professor (b. 1979)

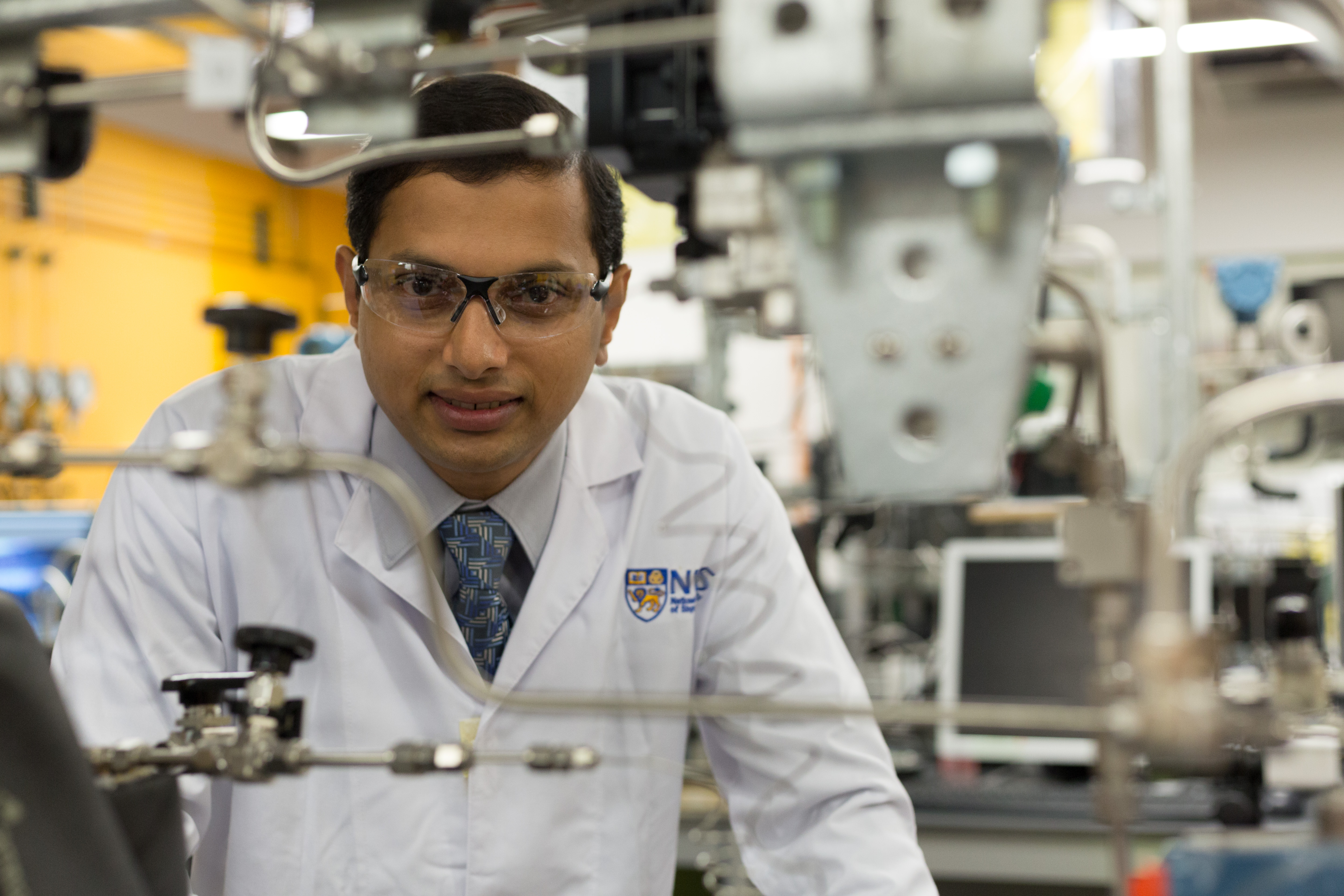
- Linga in his lab at NUS
- Born: 21 April 1979 (age 47); Chennai, India
- Education: University of Madras; Indian Institute of Technology Kharagpur; The University of British Columbia
- Occupation: Academic
- Employer: National University of Singapore
- Title: Vice Dean for Industry, Innovation & Enterprise and Professor at the Department of Chemical and Biomolecular Engineering
- Website: blog.nus.edu.sg/lingalab/

Praveen Linga PhD FRSC, a chemical engineer, is a professor at the National University of Singapore's Department of Chemical and Biomolecular Engineering. He is an expert in clathrate hydrates or gas hydrates. He is also the co-founder of NewGen Gas Pte Ltd, a spin-off company that specialises in solidified natural gas (SNG) technology via clathrate hydrates for natural gas storage and transport. He has been interviewed and has provided expert opinion and commentary in the media.

== Educational background ==
Praveen Linga was born on 21 April 1979 in Chennai (India) and hails from Minjur (a town near Chennai, India). His father was an agriculturist. During his primary years of education, up to 3rd standard, he went to St. Mary's Home Matriculation School in Kothagiri, Tamil Nadu, India. From 6th to 12th standard, he studied at Infant Jesus Matriculation Higher Secondary School in Manali New Town, Chennai, India. He obtained his Bachelor of Technology degree in chemical engineering from Sriram Engineering College affiliated to the University of Madras in 2000. He then went on to pursue his Master of Technology degree at Indian Institute of Technology Kharagpur and graduated in 2002. In 2004, he joined the Department of Chemical and Biological Engineering at The University of British Columbia to pursue his doctoral studies. Under the supervision of Professor Peter Englezos, he obtained his doctoral degree in 2009. He did his Postdoctoral fellowship in the Department of Chemical and Biological Engineering at The University of British Columbia for a year (2009-2010). He was the first in his family's lineage to pursue post graduation in education.

== Career ==
In 2010, he started his academic career at the National University of Singapore (NUS) as an assistant professor in the Department of Chemical and Biomolecular Engineering specializing in gas hydrates technology. In 2016, he was appointed as an associate professor with tenure and in 2019, he was appointed as the dean's chair associate professor. Since 2022, he is appointed as a full professor. He is also a visiting professor of Guangzhou Institute of Energy Conversion Chinese Academy of Sciences, PR China, a visiting guest professor of Harbin Engineering University, PR China and a visiting professor of Indian Institute of Technology Madras, India.

He is a licensed Professional Engineer (P.E.) in Singapore. He also serves as a scientific editor in various engineering journals. Currently, he serves as an Executive Editor in Energy & Fuels journal published by American Chemical Society. In the past he has served as subject editor in Applied Energy (Elsevier) and as an associate editor in Journal of Natural Gas Science and Engineering (Elsevier). He is also a member of the editorial boards of Applied Energy, Fluid Phase Equilibria (Elsevier), Advances in Applied Energy, Current Opinion in Chemical Engineering, and Processes.

== Honours and awards ==
Clarivate Analytics named him as one of the World's Most Influential Scientific Minds and Highly Cited Researchers in Engineering in 2024 and 2018. This annual list identifies scientists and social scientists who produced multiple papers ranking in the top 1% by citations for their field and year of publication, demonstrating significant research influence among their peers. In 2019, Linga received the Outstanding Asian Researcher and Engineer award for chemical engineering in Asia by the Society of Chemical Engineers, Japan (SCEJ). In 2017, he was awarded the Donald W. Davidson Award at the 9th International Conference on Gas Hydrates (ICGH9) held in Denver USA for his gas hydrate research. He was awarded the Young Researcher Award (YRA) in NUS in 2017. He is an elected fellow of the Royal Society of Chemistry in United Kingdom.

A recent publication in Energy Reports based on bibliometrics analysis of carbon capture technologies has identified Linga as one of the influential authors in the world in carbon capture technologies. He was featured in the Elsevier and Stanford University's list of top 2% scientists in the world for five consecutive years (2020-2024) across all scientific disciplines. In 2023, he was awarded the National Research Foundation (NRF) investigatorship, which is given for scientists and researchers identified as leaders in the world in their respective field(s) to pursue ground-breaking, high-risk research in Singapore. Recently in 2023, he was bestowed the Young Alumni Achievers Award by Indian Institute of Technology Kharagpur.

For his excellence in teaching, he received the Annual Teaching Excellence Award (ATEA) in 2017 from National University of Singapore. ATEA is awarded to faculty members who have displayed a high level of commitment to their teaching for the year under review.

== Research contributions ==
Professor Linga's research interests are in the areas of clathrate hydrate or gas hydrate, energy storage, carbon dioxide capture and storage (CCS) and energy recovery. His targeted applications are seawater desalination, gas storage, data center cooling and carbon capture & storage. A part of his research is also focused on energy recovery from methane hydrate, which is considered as a huge energy resource for natural gas.

His research group has been working on process innovation and process development to scale-up clathrate hydrate as a technology enabler for clean energy and sustainable applications. These applications include seawater desalination, solidified natural gas (SNG) technology for gas storage, development of a new cooling technology for data centre with semiclathrates as a medium.

A novel method to capture carbon dioxide is to employ the hydrate-based gas separation (HBGS) process from pre-combustion and post combustion streams where water is used as a solvent to capture it. Linga and his group have worked extensively on this topic with more than 30 journal publications on this process. Linga and his group's finding that inter-particle pore space is a key property to enhance the kinetics of hydrate formation enabled them to test, validate and report very cheap materials (sand, polyurethane foam) as a porous medium for the HBGS process with enhanced kinetics. On the fundamental level, their group evaluated the performance of a number of promoters for HBGS process including tetrahydrofuran, cyclopentane, and many semi-clathrate formers. Professor Linga and his group in collaboration with ExxonMobil have demonstrated the first-ever experimental evidence of the stability of carbon dioxide clathrate in deep-oceanic sediments - an essential step in making this carbon storage technology a viable reality.

Recently, Linga and his group demonstrated engineering innovation for Solidified Natural Gas (SNG) technology via clathrate hydrate for natural gas storage. About 95% of Singapore's power needs are met by natural gas-powered power plants and all of the natural gas is imported. Hence, Linga and his group embarked on developing the SNG technology as proof-of-concept and demonstrated its viability for a large scale stable stationary storage. Their group were the first to report a synergism between methane/tetrahydrofuran that rapidly enhances the kinetics of hydrate formation. His research group was the first in the world to demonstrate the long-term storage of SNG pellets for several months. One such breakthrough work introduces 1,3-Dioxolane (DIOX) as a dual functional promoter for sII hydrate formation for SNG technology. Linga has published more than 25 journal papers, secured one patent and co-founded a one spin-off company (NewGen Gas Pte Ltd) on the SNG technology.

A recent report by Clarivate and the Chinese Academy of Sciences that identifies the top 100 research fronts annually in the world has specially highlighted Professor Linga's significant contributions to a methane hydrates related research front.

Notably, the top three most-cited papers in this Research Front are from a team led by Professor Praveen Linga at the National University of Singapore.

— Clarivate, 2020

== Selected publications ==
Professor Linga has published more than 200 peer-reviewed journal articles with an h-index of 85, and his research has been cited more than 25000 times. A selected list of the invited review papers published by his group is listed below.

- Bhattacharjee, Gaurav; Linga, Praveen (April 2021). "Amino acids as kinetic promoters for gas hydrate applications: A mini review". Energy & Fuels. 35 (9): 7553–7571. Bibcode:2021EnFue..35.7553B. doi:10.1021/acs.energyfuels.1c00502. S2CID 235542132.
- Zheng, Junjie; Chong, Zheng Rong; Qureshi, M Fahed; Linga, Praveen (August 2020). "Carbon dioxide sequestration via hydrates: A potential pathway towards decarbonization". Energy & Fuels. 34 (9): 10529–10546. doi:10.1021/acs.energyfuels.0c02309. S2CID 225428567.
- He, Tianbiao; Chong, Zheng Rong; Zheng, Junjie; Ju, Yonglin; Linga, Praveen (March 2019). "LNG cold energy utilization: Prospects and challenges". Energy. 170: 557–568. Bibcode:2019Ene...170..557H. doi:10.1016/j.energy.2018.12.170. S2CID 115291343.
- Babu, Ponnivalavan; Nambiar, Abhishek; He, Tianbiao; Karimi, Iftekhar A.; Lee, Ju Dong; Englezos, Peter; Linga, Praveen (25 May 2018). "A Review of Clathrate Hydrate Based Desalination To Strengthen Energy–Water Nexus". ACS Sustainable Chemistry & Engineering. 6 (7): 8093–8107. Bibcode:2018ASCE....6.8093B. doi:10.1021/acssuschemeng.8b01616. S2CID 103113110.
- Veluswamy, Hari Prakash; Kumar, Asheesh; Seo, Yutaek; Lee, Ju Dong; Linga, Praveen (April 2018). "A review of solidified natural gas (SNG) technology for gas storage via clathrate hydrates". Applied Energy. 216: 262–285. Bibcode:2018ApEn..216..262V. doi:10.1016/j.apenergy.2018.02.059.
- Yin, Zhenyuan; Khurana, Maninder; Tan, Hoon Kiang; Linga, Praveen (June 2018). "A review of gas hydrate growth kinetic models". Chemical Engineering Journal. 342: 9–29. Bibcode:2018ChEnJ.342....9Y. doi:10.1016/j.cej.2018.01.120. S2CID 103926392.
- Khurana, Maninder; Yin, Zhenyuan; Linga, Praveen (17 November 2017). "A Review of Clathrate Hydrate Nucleation". ACS Sustainable Chemistry & Engineering. 5 (12): 11176–11203. Bibcode:2017ASCE....511176K. doi:10.1021/acssuschemeng.7b03238.
- Yin, Zhenyuan; Chong, Zheng Rong; Tan, Hoon Kiang; Linga, Praveen (September 2016). "Review of gas hydrate dissociation kinetic models for energy recovery". Journal of Natural Gas Science and Engineering. 35: 1362–1387. Bibcode:2016JNGSE..35.1362Y. doi:10.1016/j.jngse.2016.04.050.
- Chong, Zheng Rong; Yang, She Hern Bryan; Babu, Ponnivalavan; Linga, Praveen; Li, Xiao-Sen (January 2016). "Review of natural gas hydrates as an energy resource: Prospects and challenges". Applied Energy. 162: 1633–1652. Bibcode:2016ApEn..162.1633C. doi:10.1016/j.apenergy.2014.12.061.
- Babu, Ponnivalavan; Linga, Praveen; Kumar, Rajnish; Englezos, Peter (June 2015). "A review of the hydrate based gas separation (HBGS) process for carbon dioxide pre-combustion capture". Energy. 85: 261–279. Bibcode:2015Ene....85..261B. doi:10.1016/j.energy.2015.03.103.
- Veluswamy, Hari Prakash; Kumar, Rajnish; Linga, Praveen (June 2014). "Hydrogen storage in clathrate hydrates: Current state of the art and future directions". Applied Energy. 122: 112–132. Bibcode:2014ApEn..122..112V. doi:10.1016/j.apenergy.2014.01.063.
