= Energy & Fuels =

- Discipline: Chemistry, Fuels, Energy
- Language: English
- Edited by: Hongwei Wu

Publication details
- History: 1987-present
- Publisher: American Chemical Society (United States)
- Frequency: Monthly
- Impact factor: 5.3 (2022)

Standard abbreviations
- ISO 4: Energy Fuels

Indexing
- CODEN: ENFUEM
- ISSN: 0887-0624 (print); 1520-5029 (web)
- LCCN: 87658131
- OCLC no.: 13076751

Links
- Journal homepage; Online access; Online archive

Energy & Fuels is a peer-reviewed scientific journal published by the American Chemical Society. It was established in 1987. Its publication frequency switched from bimonthly to monthly in 2009. The editor-in-chief is Hongwei Wu (Curtin University).

According to the American Chemical Society, Energy & Fuels publishes reports of research in the technical area defined by the intersection of the disciplines of chemistry and chemical engineering and the application domain of non-nuclear energy and fuels.

== Editors ==
The following are the current list of Executive Editors and Associate Editors serving the Journal.

Executive Editors:

- Anthony Dufour, The National Center for Scientific Research (CNRS)
- Praveen Linga, National University of Singapore

Associate Editors:

- Martha Liliana Chacón-Patiño, Florida State University
- Lamia Goual, University of Wyoming
- Ping He, Nanjing University
- Yijiao Jiang, Macquarie University
- Anja Oasmaa, VTT Technical Research Centre of Finland Ltd
- Fateme Rezaei, Missouri University of Science and Technology
- Jitendra Sangwai, Indian Institute of Technology Madras
- Zongping Shao, Nanjing Tech University
- Minghou Xu, Huazhong University of Science and Technology
- Yunlong Zhang, ExxonMobil Research and Engineering Company

== Abstracting and indexing ==
The journal is abstracted and indexed in:

- Chemical Abstracts Service
- Scopus
- EBSCOHost
- Science Citation Index
- Current Contents/Engineering, Computing & Technology

According to the Journal Citation Reports, the journal has a 2022 Journal Impact Factor of 5.3
