= Vida e Caffè =

Coffee shop franchise in South Africa

vida e caffè

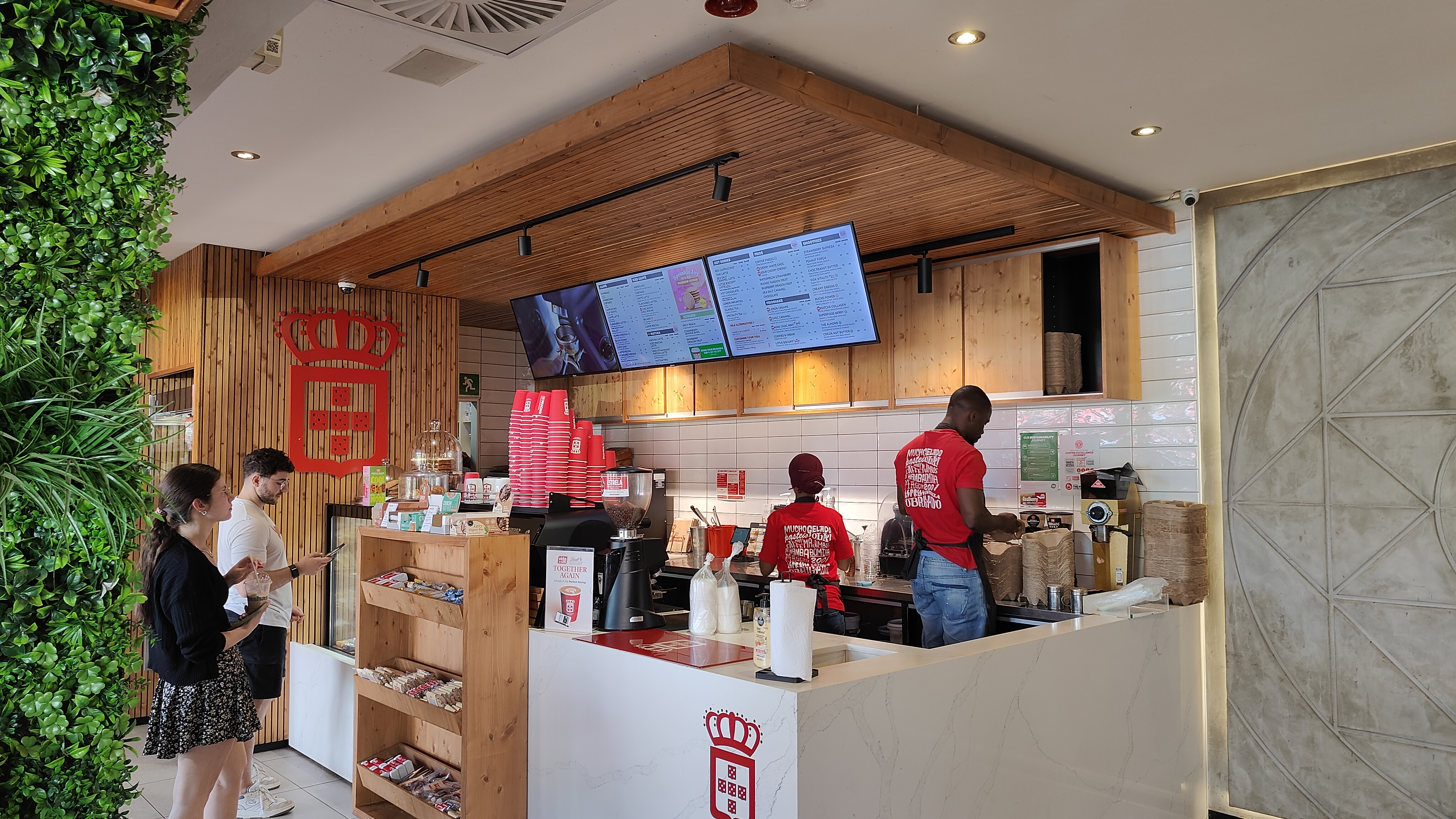
- Inside a vida store in Constantia, Cape Town
- Type: Private
- Industry: Coffeehouse chain
- Founded: 2001; 25 years ago
- Founder: Brad Armitage and Rui Esteves
- Headquarters: Cape Town, South Africa
- Number of locations: 400 (2026)
- Areas served: South Africa, Botswana, Mauritius, Ghana, Angola, Zambia, and Eswatini
- Key people: Darren Levy (CEO)
- Services: Coffeehouses
- Parent: Shoprite Holdings (since 2026)
- Subsidiaries: sweetbeet
- Website: vidaecaffe.com

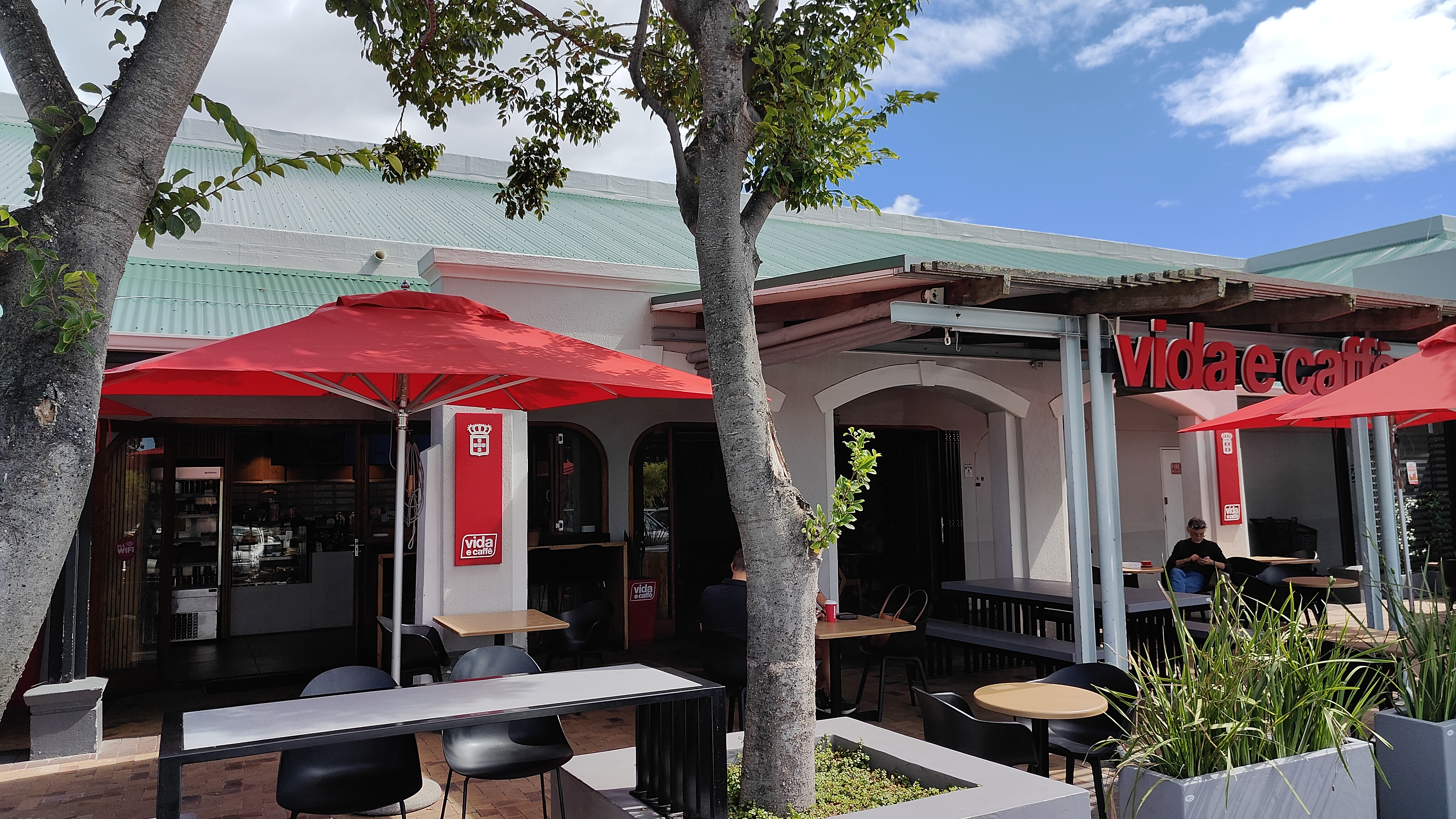
Outside a vida store in Constantia, Cape Town

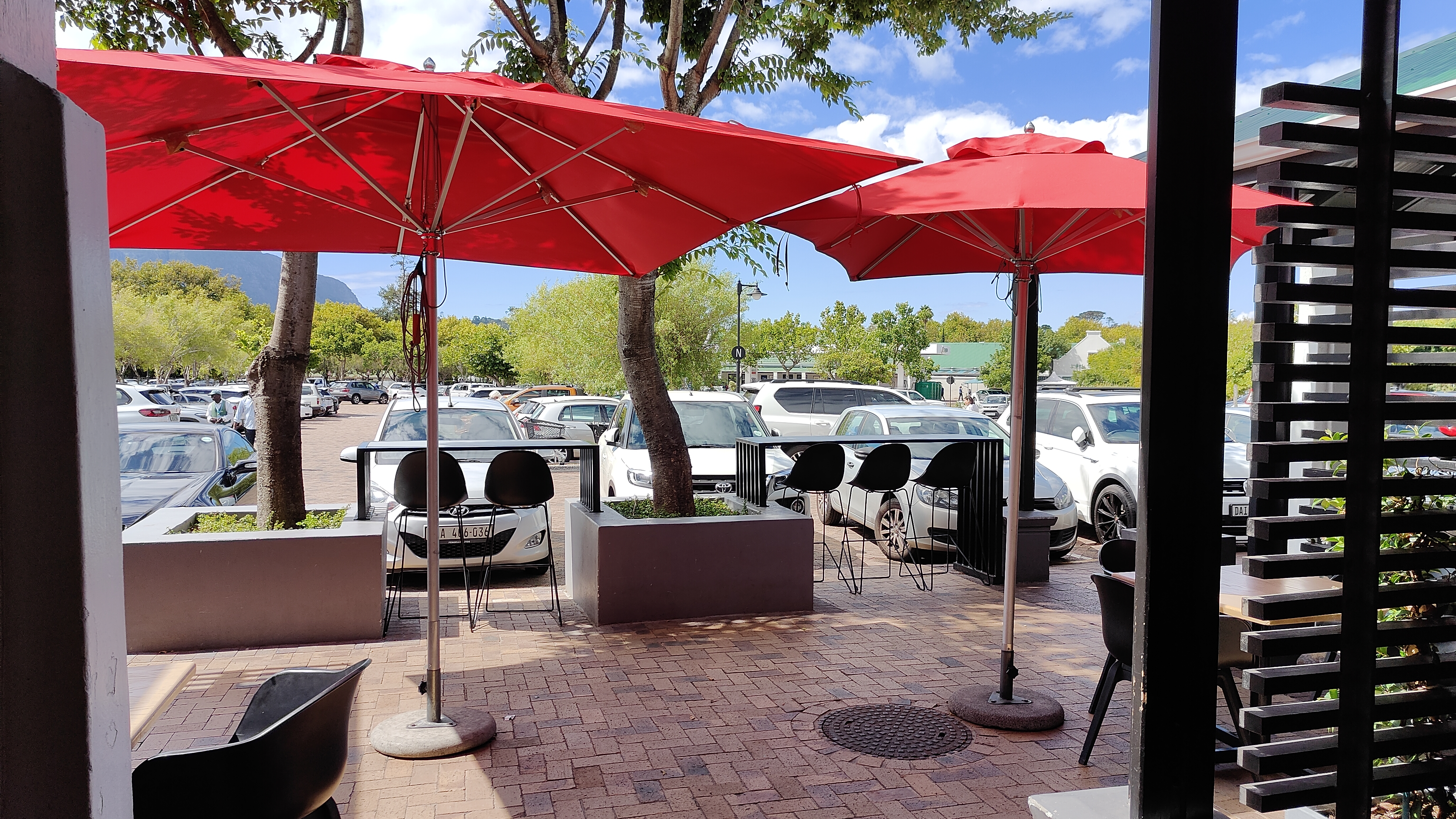
Outdoor seating at a vida e caffè store in Constantia, Cape Town

Vida e Caffè (Brazilian Portuguese: [ˈvidɐ i kaˈfɛ], Italian: [ˈviːda e kkafˈfɛ]; stylized as vida e caffè, and often referred to simply as vida) is a South African café franchise, and supplier of beverage products. It is the largest café chain in SA by number of locations, and the largest coffee chain in Africa.

Headquartered in Cape Town, vida operates 400 stores across 8 African countries, in a variety of formats. The company also operates sweetbeet, a subsidiary health-focused restaurant chain with 10 outlets, most of which are located in Cape Town.

Since September 2026, the company has been a wholly owned subsidiary of South African retail conglomerate Shoprite Holdings. The name vida e caffè means 'life and coffee', mixing the Portuguese for 'life' with the Italian for 'and coffee'.

== History ==
Vida e Caffè was founded in 2001, by Brad Armitage and Rui Esteves. The company opened its first store in Kloof Street, Cape Town, Western Cape, in October 2001. When doing so, vida drew inspiration from street cafés in Portugal, and blended that with an African style.

vida opened its first international store (the first outlet outside South Africa) via a partner, in 2013, when it branched out into Ghana.

Darren Levy became the chain's CEO in 2015. At the time, vida had a total of 120 outlets.

Also in 2015, vida branched out further afield, entering into a master franchise agreement for stores in Mauritius.

In 2019, vida opened its first outlet in Zambia.

In September 2020, vida opened its first drive-through outlet in Vaalpark, Johannesburg.

In late 2021, vida acquired health-oriented restaurant chain sweetbeet. The following year, sweetbeet opened four new locations.

Vida announced a partnership with grocery retail chain Spar South Africa in April 2025. As part of the collaboration, full-service Vida outlets would open gradually inside Spar stores across South Africa. Vida's CEO, Darren Levy, stated that 5 such stores were already in operation, and that more would roll out in the proceeding months.

In June 2026, it was reported that Vida had opened its 400th store.

In September 2026, it was reported that Vida had been wholly acquired by South Africa's largest retail group, Shoprite Holdings, for an undisclosed amount. It was not reported at the time whether the acquisition would impact the partnership between Shoprite subsidiary Checkers and the South African operations of Starbucks.

== Locations ==
As of June 2026, vida operates 400 stores, located across 8 countries. The majority of its stores are situated in South Africa. The rest are located across Botswana, Mauritius, Ghana, Angola, Zambia, and Eswatini.

Vida's most popular city in terms of store numbers is Cape Town, followed by Johannesburg, and then Durban.

One of its Cape Town stores is situated at the lower station of the Table Mountain Aerial Cableway, which is part of the Table Mountain National Park - the most visited national park in South Africa.

vida also offers drive through facilities at some of its stores; as well as home delivery through their own app (in which customers can also pay, and earn loyalty points), and in the South African MrD and Uber Eats apps.

A number of the stores are micro-operations located within business office spaces to cater office workers. The presence of the company, its market share, and relatively low franchise costs have been noted as a reason why the American multinational coffee company Starbucks has had limited success in expanding in South Africa.

The company has a partnership with the South African branch of Shell to sell coffee at its petrol stations across the country. It does this at some Shell petrol stations through the brand Torrador by Vida e Caffe, which was co-developed by Shell and vida, and has a customized menu. There are also Torrador Self Service offerings at some Shell garages.

== Operations ==
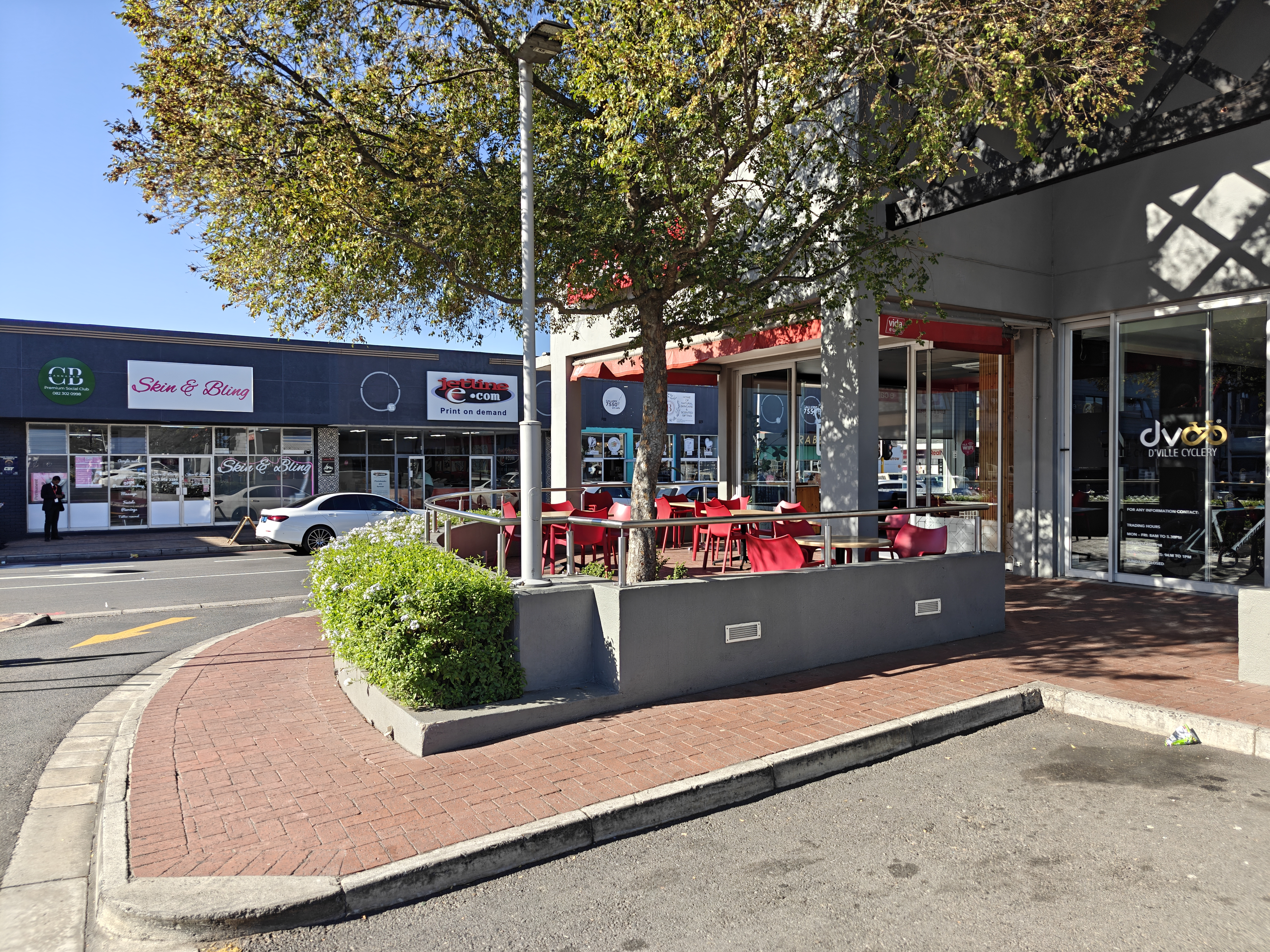
Outdoor seating at a vida in Durbanville, Western Cape

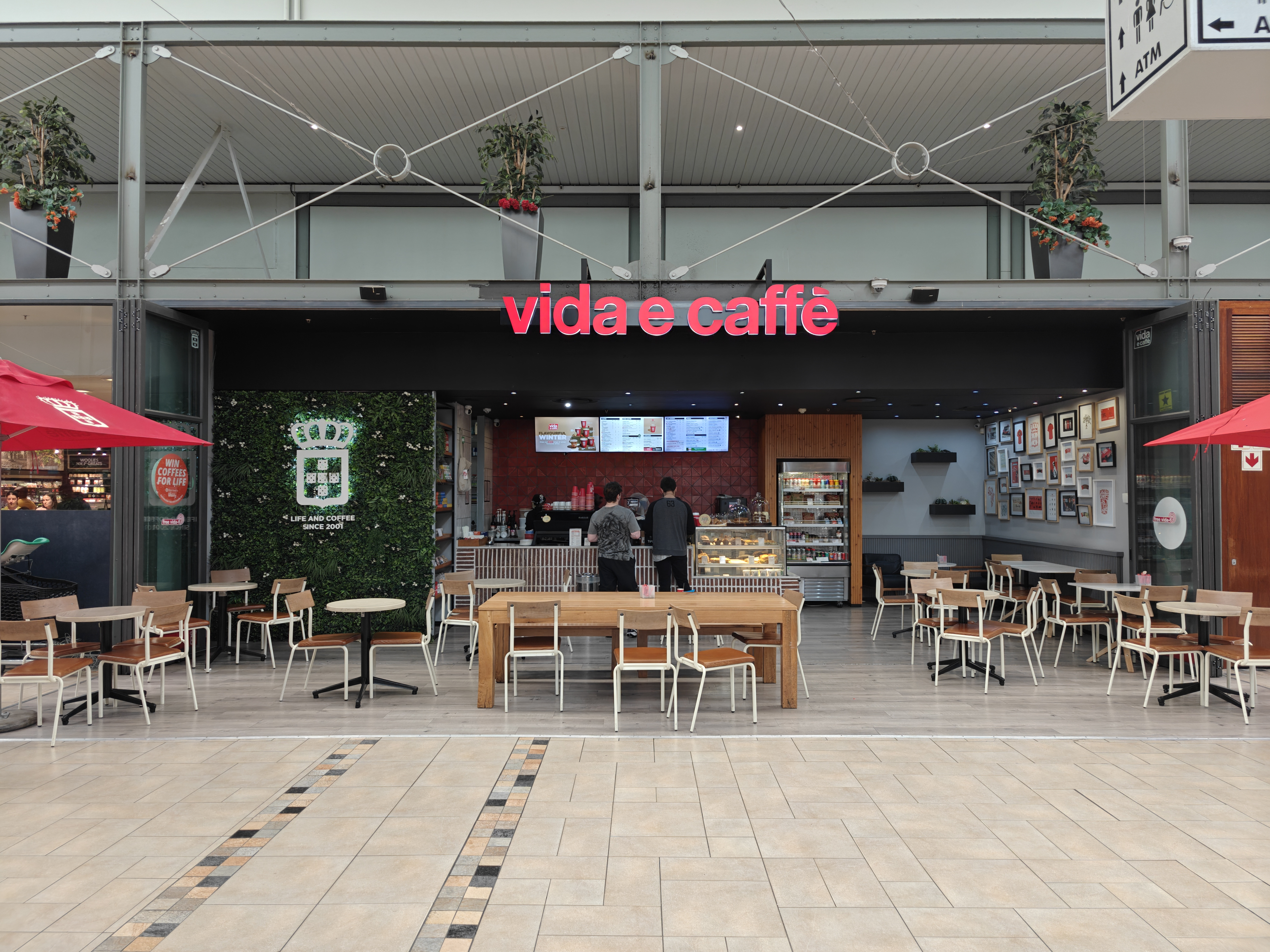
A vida store at The Paddocks shopping center in Milnerton, Cape Town

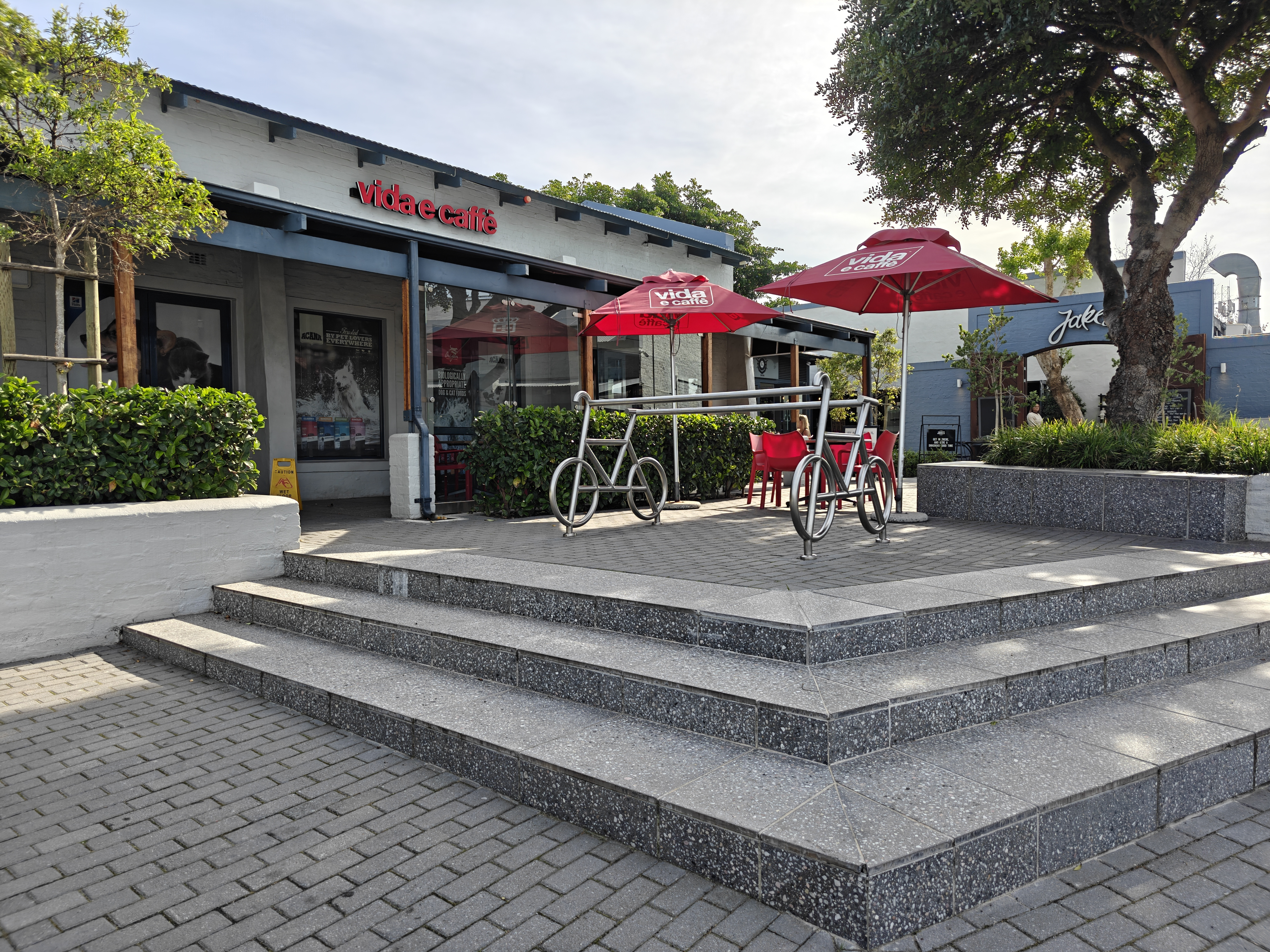
Vida at Steenberg Village shopping center in Tokai, Cape Town

vida operates stores across a number of different formats. These include:

- High Street (traditional) stores, situated in shopping districts and on main roads in towns and cities
- Forecourt locations, situated at gas stations
- Drive-thru stores, providing customers with a way to purchase from their cars
- Corporate locations, serving specific clients' offices
- Other locations, including hotels, convention centers, and vending machines.

vida is the official coffee partner to South African medical insurance provider Discovery, and South African book retailer Exclusive Books.

It also operates cafes inside various stores of local building and garden supply chain Builders Warehouse, and supplies coffee to South African airline, LIFT.

Through its model of operating stores inside corporate headquarters, vida has outlets in HQs of businesses in South Africa including those of EY, MultiChoice, Vodacom, MTN, Old Mutual, The Foschini Group, Liberty Life, KPMG, Sanlam, and Standard Bank

vida allows selected individuals to operate franchise stores, via its entity, Vida e Caffè Corporate Services (Pty) Ltd. This setup provides franchisees with training, vending audits, access to a national technical support network, as well as equipment rental options.

=== Sweetbeet ===
vida also operates its subsidiary health-oriented restaurant chain, sweetbeet. The chain offers a variety of food and beverages, including salads, burritos, breakfast items, juices, and smoothies. As of September 2025, there are 10 sweetbeet locations, 9 of which are in Cape Town. Multiple of these restaurants are located alongside vida coffeehouses.

== Coffee and baristas ==
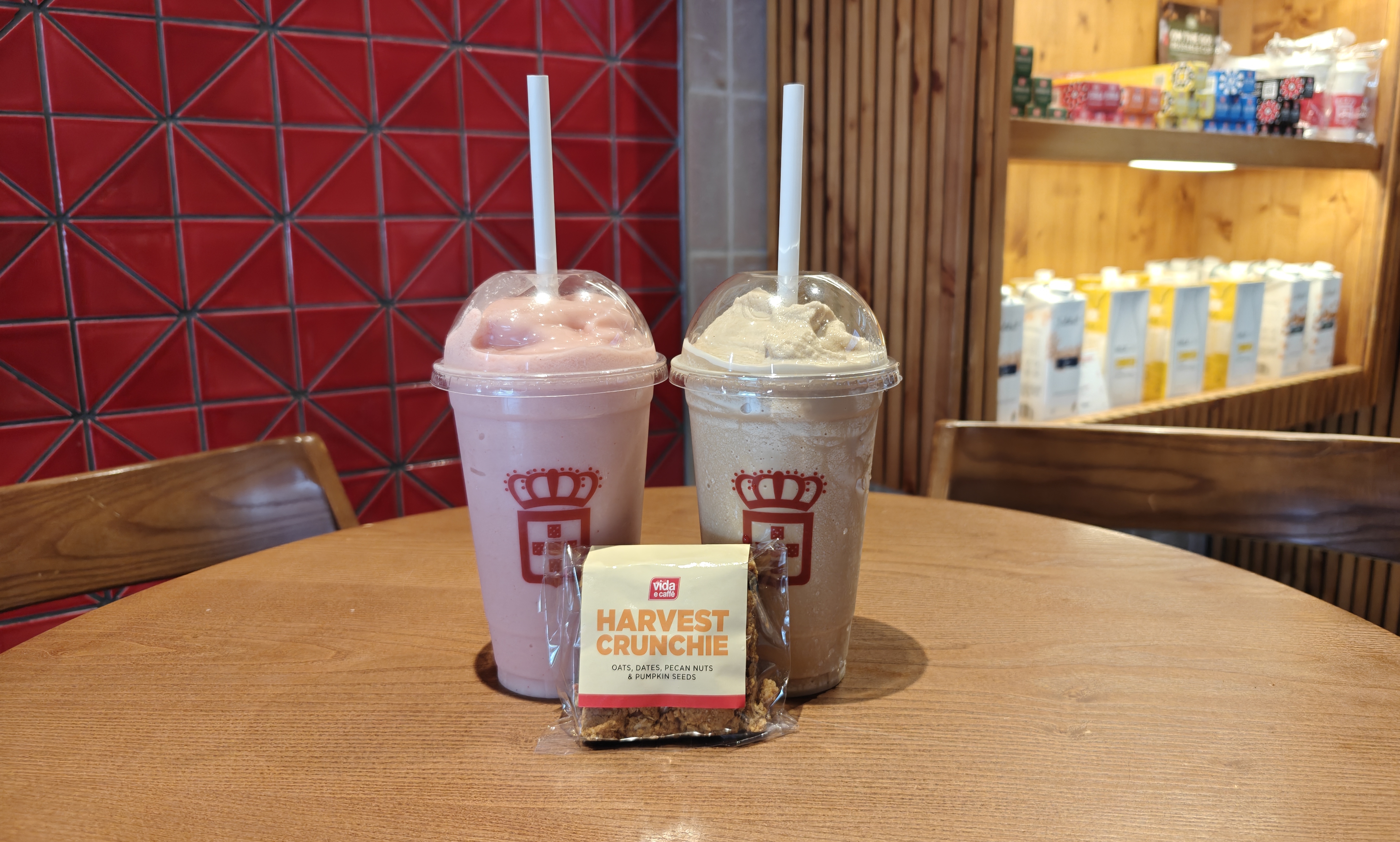
Various items at a Vida store in Cape Town

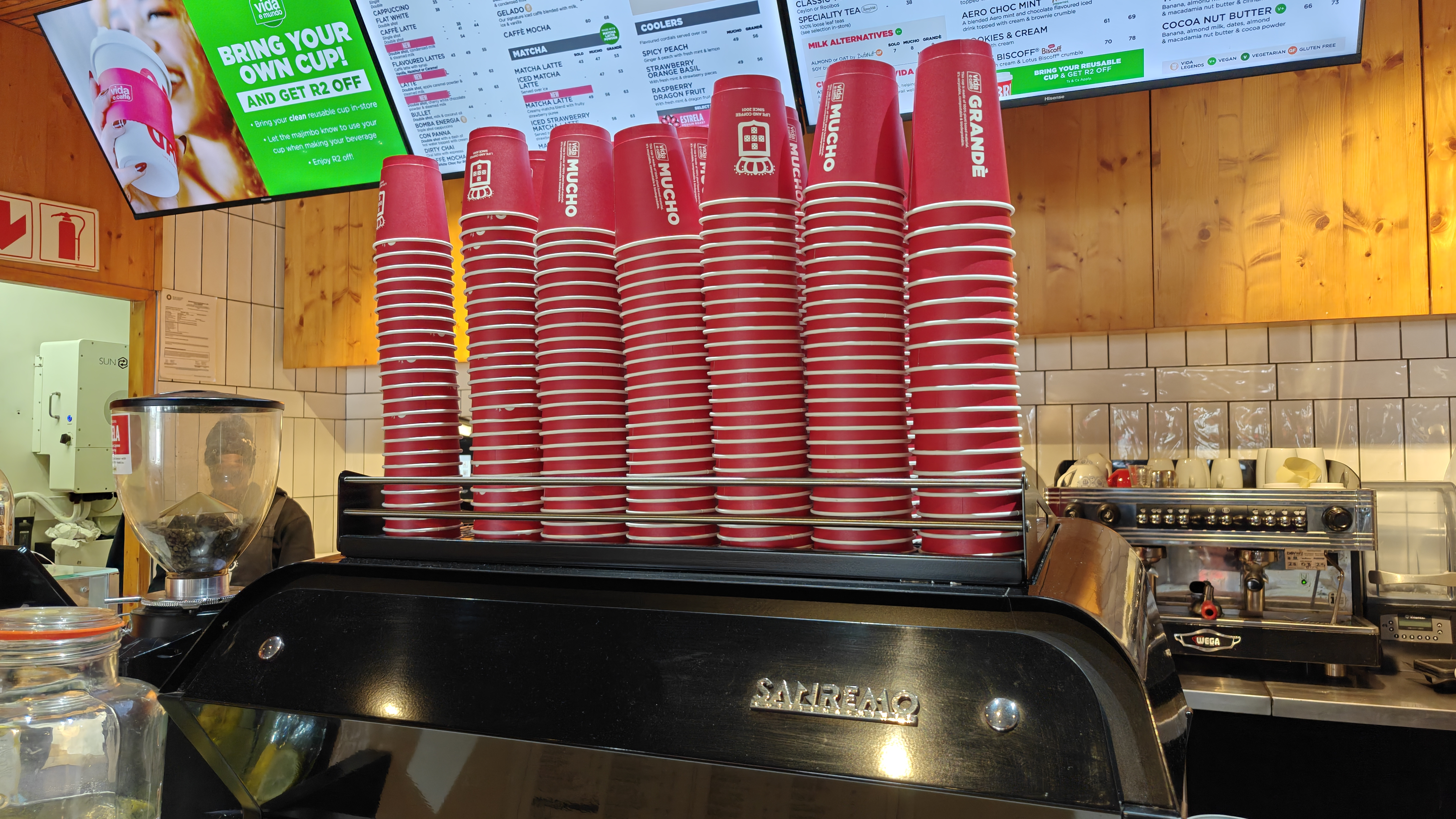
Vida cup sizes and a Sanremo espresso machine

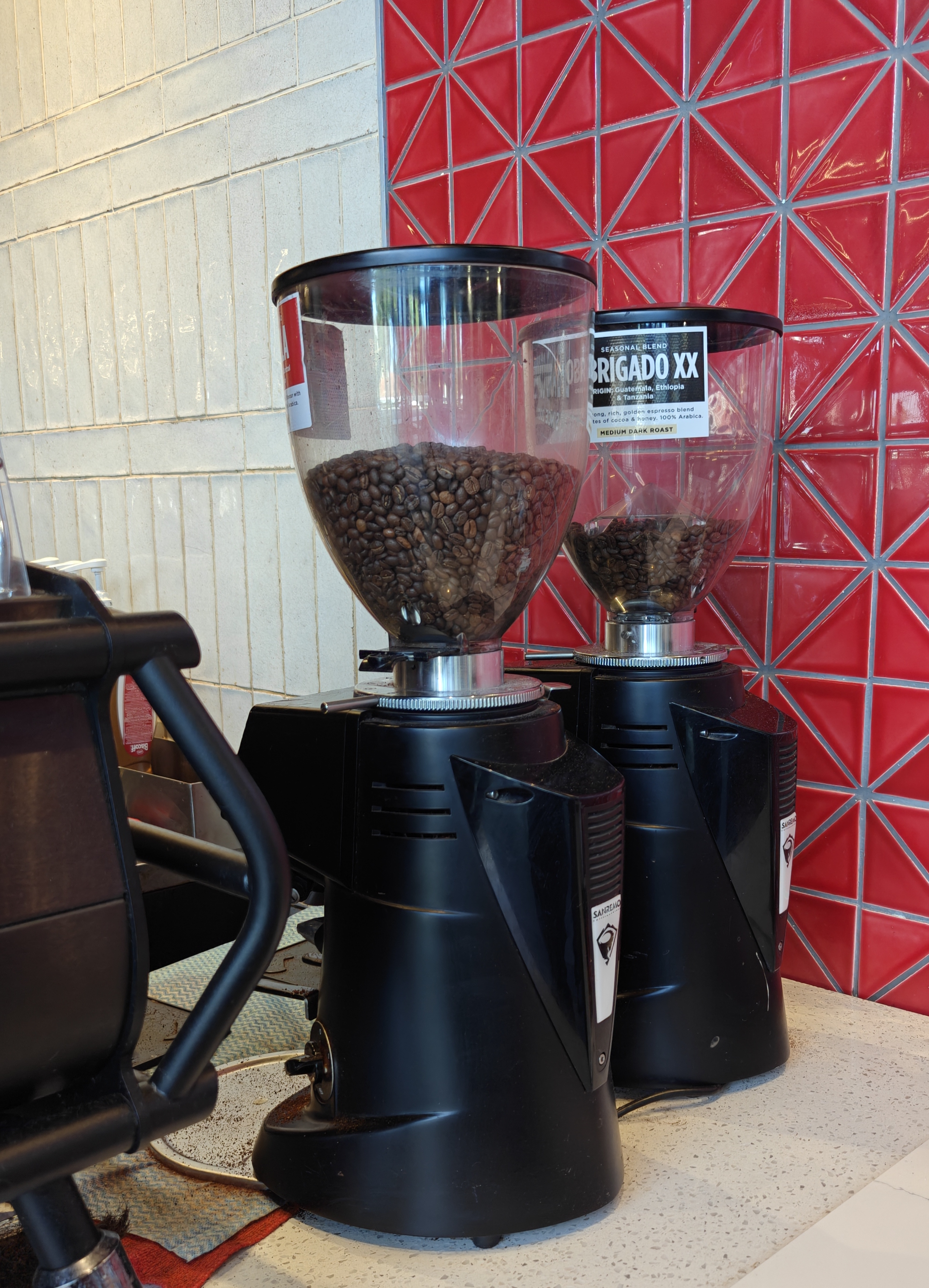
Vida coffee beans at an outlet in 3Arts Village, Plumstead, Cape Town

vida offers a range of bespoke, and single origin coffee blends, which are named using an astronomical theme, such as being named after stars and constellations. Examples include Auriga, Estrela, Electra, Devra, and Vega.

The company sells hot and cold drinks at its outlets, and uses barista machines from Gaggia. vida also sells take-home coffee in capsule and bean form, as well as other items, including ready-made food. Some locations offer both indoor and outdoor seating.

Kwa-Zulu Natal-based coffee producer Redberry Coffee (the Redberry Coffee Collective) has partnered with vida to sell its 100% arabica coffee at vida cafes.

vida refers to its baristas as Passionistas, and every barista undergoes at least 3 months of training. Passionistas learn experientially, and train in either Cape Town or Johannesburg.

== Sustainability ==
Through its sustainability initiative, Grab Green, and its broader sustainability journey, vida e mundo (Brazilian Portuguese for, "life and world"), vida focuses on making a positive impact on the planet. This includes community engagement, and the use and sale of eco-friendly products, such as fully compostable coffee capsules, reusable travel mugs, reusable coffee cups, 100% hemp tote bags, and used coffee grounds for gardening.

== See also ==
- Retailing in South Africa
