= Hungry Lion =

South African fast food franchise

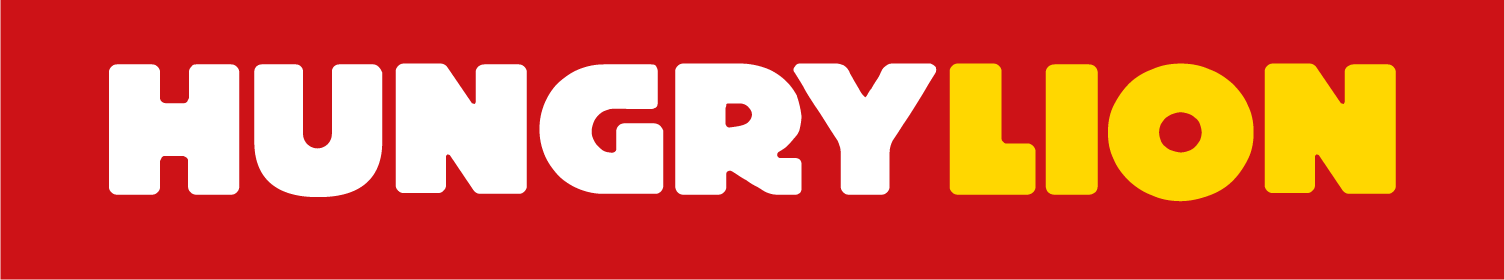
- Logo used since 1997

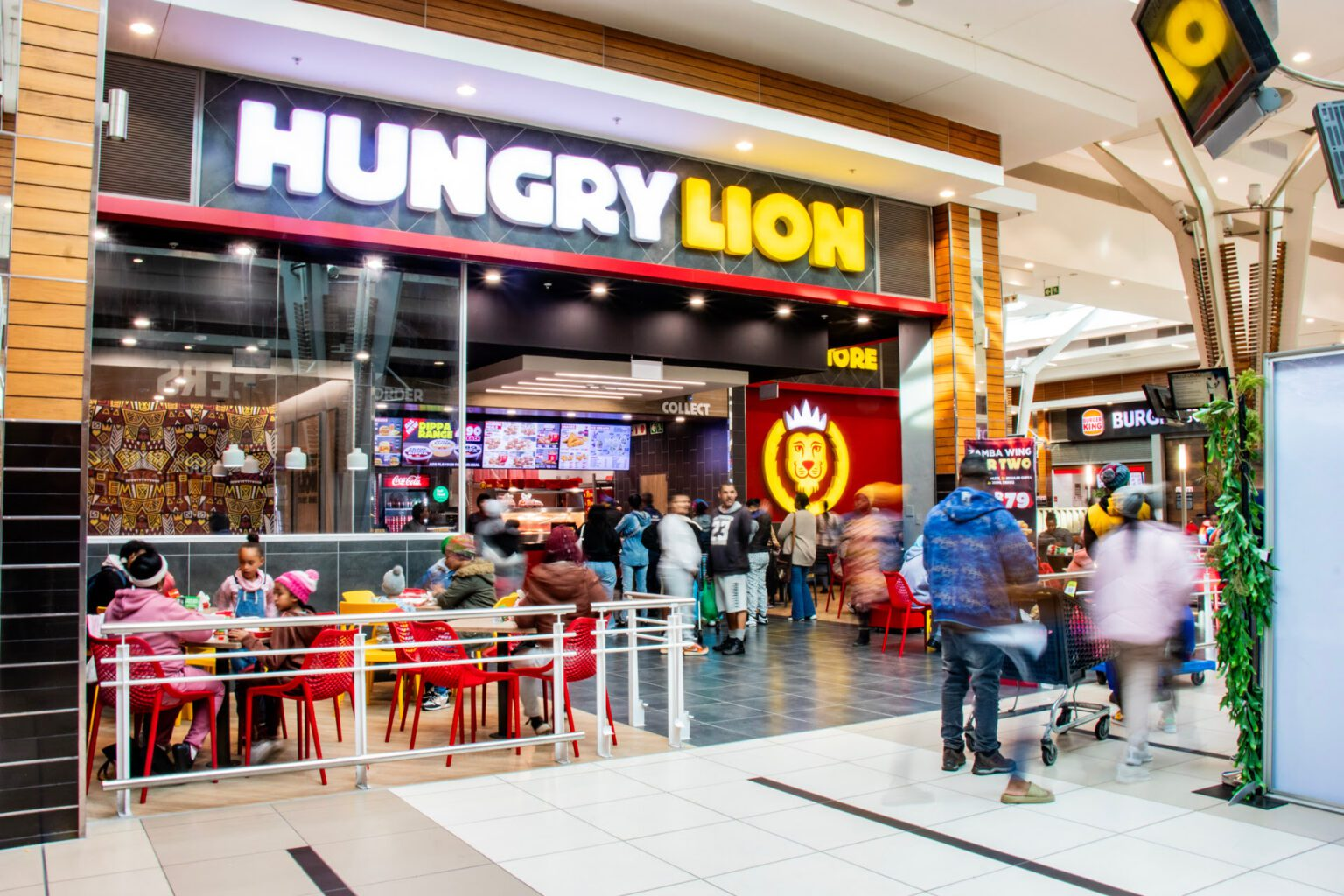
- Type: Private
- Industry: Restaurant
- Genre: Fast food
- Founded: 1997; 29 years ago
- Headquarters: Stellenbosch Local Municipality, Western Cape, Stellenbosch, South Africa
- Number of locations: 550+ (2026)
- Area served: Southern Africa
- Key people: Adrian Basson (CEO)
- Products: Fried chicken Ice cream Sides
- Number of employees: 12,180+ (2026)
- Website: www.hungrylion.co.za

Hungry Lion is a South African fast food restaurant chain known for its fried chicken. Since its establishment in 1997, the company has expanded its operations throughout Southern Africa.

As of late 2026, the chain operates over 600 locations in ten African countries, and employs over 10,000 people.

== History ==
Hungry Lion opened its first restaurant in 1997 at Eikestad Mall in Stellenbosch, in the Western Cape province of South Africa. It was originally a subsidiary of major South African supermarket chain Shoprite Holdings Ltd.

Following its initial success, the company open four additional locations within the same year, including two in Zambia.

Many of its first locations were attached to Shoprite stores until Hungry Lion rebranded in 2014 and switched to mostly independent locations.

In 2018, Hungry Lion was spun off from its parent company Shoprite and became an independent chain, with all stores being corporate-owned.

In 2026, Hungry Lion was the fastest growing fried chicken brand in Africa. It has over 600 locations in South Africa, Zambia, Namibia, Angola, Botswana, Lesotho, Eswatini, Zimbabwe, Mauritius and Tanzania.

In July 2026, Hungry Lion reported to have well exceeded its growth rate estimation back in 2024. That year, the company's CEO told investors from Standard Bank at the Africa Unlocked Conference that the fast food chain intended to open 100 stores per year going forward. However, in 2026, its expansion rate was 250 stores per year. At the time, the chain had over 500 stores across nine countries, and intended to reach a total of 750 by the end of 2026.
