= OK Bazaars =

South African retailer

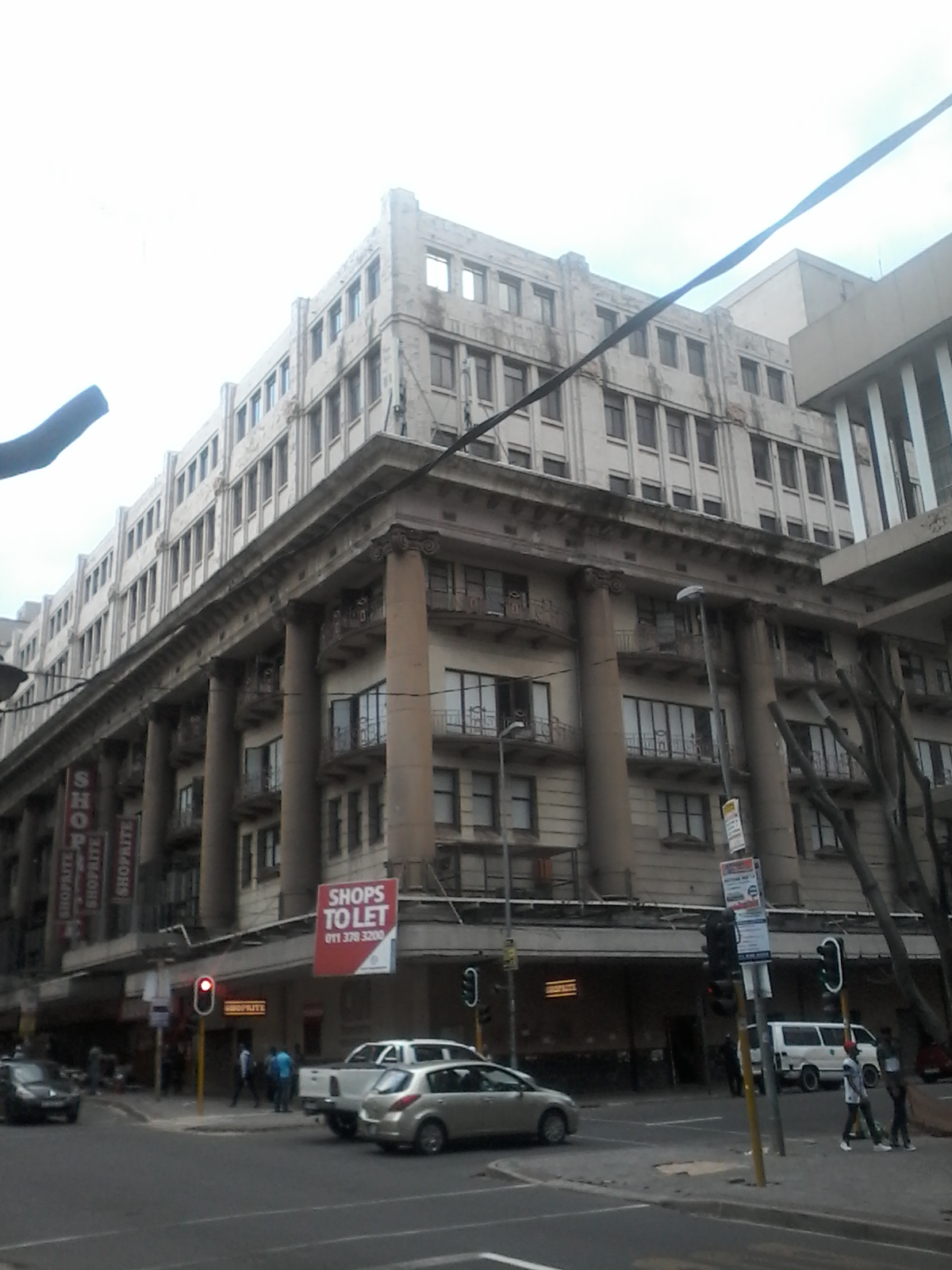
- Company type: Public
- Traded as: JSE: SHP
- Industry: Retail
- Founded: 1927
- Headquarters: Johannesburg, South Africa
- Key people: Michael Miller and Sam Cohen
- Website: Homepage

OK Bazaars is one of the oldest retail shops in South Africa, established in 1927 by partners Michael Miller and Sam Cohen still in existence today. The first shop opened in corner President and Eloff streets in Johannesburg and over the years the brand grew to have more than 100 shops around South Africa.

OK Bazaars and Garlick's were the two, two-story department stores anchoring the original shopping levels of the Carlton Centre, at the time the tallest building in Africa.

OK Bazaars was financially strained, and in 1997, was acquired by the Shoprite group.
