= List of largest retail companies =

This list ranks the largest retail companies by revenue, market capitalization and number of stores.

== By revenue ==
This list ranks the largest retail companies, according to the British international consulting firm Deloitte. Companies are ordered by revenue from retail operations in billions of US Dollars in FY 2023. The list does not include Wakefern Food Corporation with revenue of US$16.3 billion in 2017.

Rank	Name	Dominant operational format	Retail revenue (US$ billions)	Net profit margin	Headquarters	Country
1	Walmart	Hypermarket/Supercenter/Superstore	648.125	2.5%	Bentonville	United States
2	Amazon	Non-store (E-commerce)	251.902	5.3%	Seattle	United States
3	Costco	Cash & Carry/Warehouse Club	242.290	2.6%	Issaquah	United States
4	Schwarz Gruppe	Discount store	177.009	...	Neckarsulm	Germany
5	The Home Depot	Home improvement	152.669	9.9%	Atlanta	United States
6	The Kroger Company	Supermarket	148.905	-1.4%	Cincinnati	United States
7	Aldi	Discount store	123.608	...	Essen and Mülheim	Germany
8	JD.com	Non-store	122.884	2.1%	Beijing	China
9	Walgreens Boots Alliance	Drug store/Pharmacy	121.191	-2.5%	Deerfield	United States
10	CVS Health	Drug store/Pharmacy	116.763	...	Woonsocket	United States
11	Target Corporation	Discount department store	105.803	3.9%	Minneapolis	United States
12	Ahold Delhaize	Supermarket	97.837	2.1%	Zaandam	Netherlands
13	Carrefour	Discount department store	90.803	1.9%	Boulogne-Billancourt	France
14	Lowe's	Home improvement	86.250	8.9%	Mooresville	United States
15	Tesco	Hypermarket/Supercenter/Superstore	85.218	1.7%	Welwyn Garden City	United Kingdom
16	Albertsons	Supermarket	79.238	1.6%	Boise	United States
17	Edeka	Supermarket	75.930	...	Hamburg	Germany
18	LVMH	Other Specialty	73.299	18.5%	Paris	France
19	Seven & I Holdings	Convenience/Forecourt store	72.750	2.1%	Tokyo	Japan
20	Rewe Group	Supermarket	62.735	0.9%	Cologne	Germany
21	E.Leclerc	Hypermarket/Supercenter/Superstore	63.229	...	Ivry-sur-Seine	France
22	Æon	Hypermarket/Supercenter/Superstore	58.671	1.1%	Chiba	Japan
23	Publix	Supermarket	57.100	7.6%	Lakeland	United States
24	TJX Companies	Apparel/Footwear specialty	54.217	8.3%	Framingham	United States
25	Loblaw Companies	Hypermarket/Supercenter/Superstore	44.012	3.7%	Brampton	Canada
26	HE Butt Grocery	Supermarket	43.600	...	San Antonio	United States
27	Best Buy	Electronics store	43.452	2.9%	Richfield	United States
28	Les Mousquetaires	Supermarket	43.377	0.2%	Bondoufle	France
29	IKEA	Furniture speciality	42.960	3.4%	Delft	Netherlands
30	Woolworths Group	Supermarket	42.005	0.2%	Sydney	Australia
31	Sainsbury's	Hypermarket/Supercenter/Superstore	40.580	0.4%	London	United Kingdom
32	Inditex	Apparel/Footwear specialty	38.935	15.0%	Arteixo	Spain
33	Dollar General	Discount store	38.692	4.3%	Goodlettsville	United States
34	Coop	Supermarket	36.794	2.1%	Basel	Switzerland
35	Mercadona	Supermarket	36.267	3.1%	Valencia	Spain
36	Auchan	Hypermarket/Supercenter/Superstore	35.590	-1.1%	Croix	France
37	Jerónimo Martins	Discount store	33.780	2.5%	Lisbon	Portugal
38	Asda	Supermarket	32.611	0.8%	Leeds	United Kingdom
39	Groupe ADEO	Home improvement	31.952	3.8%	Ronchin	France
40	Reliance Retail	Supermarket	31.002	3.4%	Mumbai	India
41	Migros	Hypermarket/Supercenter/Superstore	30.688	0.5%	Zürich	Switzerland
42	Shein	Non-store (E-commerce)	30.666	6.5%		Singapore
43	Dollar Tree	Discount store	30.604	-3.3%	Chesapeake	United States
44	Coopérative U	Supermarket	30.360	...	Rungis	France
45	Coles Group	Supermarket	29.061	2.6%	Hawthorn East	Australia
46	FEMSA	Convenience/Forecourt store	26.839	...	Monterrey	Mexico
47	CP All	Convenience/Forecourt store	25.998	2.0%	Bangkok	Thailand
48	EssilorLuxottica	Apparel/Footwear specialty	25.964	9.6%	Charenton-le-Pont	France
49	Alibaba Group New Retail & Direct Sales	Department store	24.890	...		Hong Kong
50	Metro AG	Cash & carry/Warehouse club	24.679	1.4%	Düsseldorf	Germany
51	Ceconomy	Electronics specialty	23.516	-0.2%	Düsseldorf	Germany
52	AS Watson Group	Drug store/Pharmacy	23.479	...		Hong Kong
53	Macy’s	Department store	23.092	0.5%	New York City	United States
54	H&M	Clothing store	22.621	3.7%	Stockholm	Sweden
55	Empire Company	Supermarket	22.400	2.5%	Stellarton	Canada
56	Nike Direct	Apparel/Footwear specialty	22.351	...	Beaverton	United States
57	Wesfarmers	Department store/Home improvement	22.288	5.8%	Perth	Australia
58	Meijer	Hypermarket/Supercenter/Superstore	21.950	...	Grand Rapids	United States
59	Coupang	Non-store	21.223	5.6%	Seoul	South Korea
60	Ross Stores	Apparel/Footwear specialty	20.377	9.2%	Dublin	United States
61	BJ's Wholesale Club	Cash & carry/Warehouse club	19.969	2.6%	Westborough	United States
62	Conad	Supermarket	19.866	...	Bologna	Italy
63	Berkshire-Hathaway Retail	Other specialty	19.408	...	Omaha	United States
64	Fast Retailing	Apparel/Footwear specialty	18.964	11.4%	Yamaguchi	Japan
65	Wm Morrison Supermarkets	Supermarket	18.776	...	Bradford	United Kingdom
66	Alimentation Couche-Tard	Convenience/Forecourt store	17.536	...	Laval	Canada
67	AutoZone	Other specialty	17.457	14.5%	Memphis	United States
68	Decathlon Group	Other speciality	12.993	5.1%	Villeneuve-d’Ascq	France
69	Kering	Apparel/Footwear specialty	17.047	15.7%	Paris	France
70	e-mart	Supermarket	17.017	-1.3%	Seoul	South Korea
71	Cencosud	Supermarket	16.768	5.4%	Las Condes	Chile
72	Richemont	Other specialty	16.662	11.4%	Bellevue	Switzerland
73	Kohl's	Department store	16.586	1.8%	Menomonee Falls	United States
74	Marks & Spencer	Department store	16.541	3.2%	Lancing	United Kingdom
75	Kingfisher	Home improvement	16.472	2.7%	London	United Kingdom
76	Coop Italia	Hypermarket/Supercenter/Superstore	16.334	...	Casalecchio di Reno	Italy
77	Spar Holding	Supermarket	16.330	1.1%	Waalwijk	Netherlands
78	O'Reilly Automotive	Other specialty	15.812	14.8%	Springfield	United States
79	S Group	Supermarket	15.681	...	Helsinki	Finland
80	Chedraui	Supermarket	15.407	3.0%	Xalapa	Mexico
81	Dirk Rossmann GmbH	Drug store/Pharmacy	15.341	...	Burgwedel	Germany
82	Metro Inc.	Supermarket	15.259	4.9%	Montreal	Canada
83	Avolta	Other specialty	14.949	1.7%	Basel	Switzerland
84	Gap	Apparel/Footwear specialty	14.889	3.4%	San Francisco	United States
85	Vipshop	Non-store	14.875	7.3%	Guangzhou	China
86	Otto	Non-store	14.657	-2.8%	Hamburg	Germany
87	Tractor Supply Company	Other specialty	14.556	7.6%	Brentwood	United States
88	Genuine Parts Company	Other specialty	14.247	5.7%	Atlanta	United States
89	Nordstrom	Department store	14.219	0.9%	Seattle	United States
90	ICA Gruppen	Supermarket	14.188	2.9%	Solna	Sweden
91	Chow Tai Fook	Other specialty	13.891	6.1%		Hong Kong
92	Assaí Atacadista	Cash & carry/Warehouse club	13.701	1.1%	São Paulo	Brazil
93	John Lewis Partnership	Supermarket	13.684	0.4%	London	United Kingdom
94	Hermès	Apparel/Footwear specialty	13.485	32.2%	Paris	France
95	El Corte Inglés	Department store	13.372	3.5%	Madrid	Spain
96	Menards	Home improvement	13.240	...	Eau Claire	United States
97	Shoprite Holdings	Supermarket	13.225	2.5%	Cape Town	South Africa
98	JD Sports	Apparel/Footwear specialty	13.080	5.7%	Bury	United Kingdom
99	Hy-Vee	Supermarket	13.000	...	West Des Moines	United States
100	Dick's Sporting Goods	Other specialty	12.984	8.1%	Coraopolis	United States

== By market cap ==
Companies are ordered by their total market capitalization on August 19, 2025. Only publicly listed retailers can be included in this ranking.

Rank	Name	Market cap (US$ billions)	Country
1	Amazon	2,431	United States
2	Walmart	808.3	United States
3	Costco	435.0	United States
4	The Home Depot	405.1	United States
5	Alibaba	286.1	China
6	Inditex	159.2	Spain
7	TJX Companies	150.2	United States
8	Lowe's	143.7	United States
9	Fast Retailing	102.4	Japan
10	CVS Health	90.0	United States
11	AutoZone	69.0	United States
12	Wesfarmers	66.6	Australia
13	Coupang	52.6	South Korea
14	Walmex	52.4	Mexico
15	Loblaw Companies	49.7	Canada
16	Ross Stores	48.4	United States
17	Alimentation Couche-Tard	48.1	Canada
18	Target Corporation	47.8	United States
19	Kroger	46.7	United States
20	JD.com	45.2	China
21	Dollarama	39.2	Canada
22	Ahold Delhaize	37.0	Netherlands
23	Tesco	37.0	United Kingdom
24	DMart	34.9	India
25	Seven & I Holdings	34.1	Japan

== By number of stores ==
Rank	Name	Stores	Country
1	Seven & I Holdings	89,604	Japan
2	M&G Stationery	70,000	China
3	MeiYiJia	40,000	China
4	PJSC Magnit	32,589	Russia
5	X5 Retail	25,943	Russia
6	FamilyMart	24,941	Japan
7	Salim Group	21,980	Indonesia
8	OXXO	21,907	Mexico
9	Krasnoe & Beloe	20,527	Russia
10	Dollar General	20,388	United States
