= The Journal of Chemical Thermodynamics =

- Discipline: Thermodynamics
- Language: English
- Edited by: W.E. Acree Jr., N. Kishore, B. F. Woodfield

Publication details
- History: 1969-present
- Publisher: Elsevier
- Frequency: Monthly
- Impact factor: 3.178 (2020)

Standard abbreviations
- ISO 4: J. Chem. Thermodyn.

Indexing
- CODEN: JCTDAF
- ISSN: 0021-9614
- LCCN: 70005751
- OCLC no.: 01243408

Links
- Journal homepage; Online access

The Journal of Chemical Thermodynamics is a monthly peer-reviewed scientific journal covering experimental thermodynamics and thermophysics including bio-thermodynamics, calorimetry, phase equilibria, equilibrium thermodynamic properties and transport properties. It is published by Elsevier. The editors-in-chief are W.E. Acree Jr., N. Kishore, B. F. Woodfield.

== Abstracting and indexing ==
The journal is abstracted and indexed in Chemical Abstracts, Chemistry Citation Index, Current Contents/Physics, Chemical, & Earth Sciences, Engineered Materials Abstracts, Physics Abstracts, Reaction Citation Index, Science Citation Index, and Scopus.
