= Fluid Phase Equilibria =

- Discipline: Thermodynamics, Physical Chemistry
- Language: English

Publication details
- Publisher: Elsevier (Netherlands)
- Frequency: 24/year
- Impact factor: 2.775 (2020)

Standard abbreviations
- ISO 4: Fluid Ph. Equilib.

Indexing
- ISSN: 0378-3812

Links
- Journal homepage

Fluid Phase Equilibria is a peer-reviewed scientific journal on physical chemistry and thermodynamics that is published by Elsevier. The articles deal with experimental, theoretical and applied research related to properties of pure components and mixtures, especially phase equilibria, caloric and transport properties of fluid and solid phases. It has an impact factor of 2.8 (2024).

== Editors ==
The current editors are:

- Clare McCabe - Editor in Chief. Vanderbilt University Department of Chemical and Biomolecular Engineering, Nashville, Tennessee, United States
- Ioannis Economou - Texas A&M University at Qatar, Education City, PO Box 23874, Doha, Qatar
- Yoshio Iwai - Kyushu University Faculty of Engineering Graduate School of Engineering Department of Chemical Engineering, 744, Motooka, 819-0395, Fukuoka, Japan
- Georgios Kontogeorgis - Technical University of Denmark Department of Chemical and Biochemical Engineering, Søltofts Plads, Building 229, DK-2800, Kgs Lyngby, Denmark
- Ana Soto - University of Santiago de Compostela School of Engineering, Rúa Lope Gómez de Marzoa s/n, 15782, Santiago de Compostela, Spain

== Availability ==
Fluid Phase Equilibria can be obtained in print or in electronic form.
