= Wilgenhof =

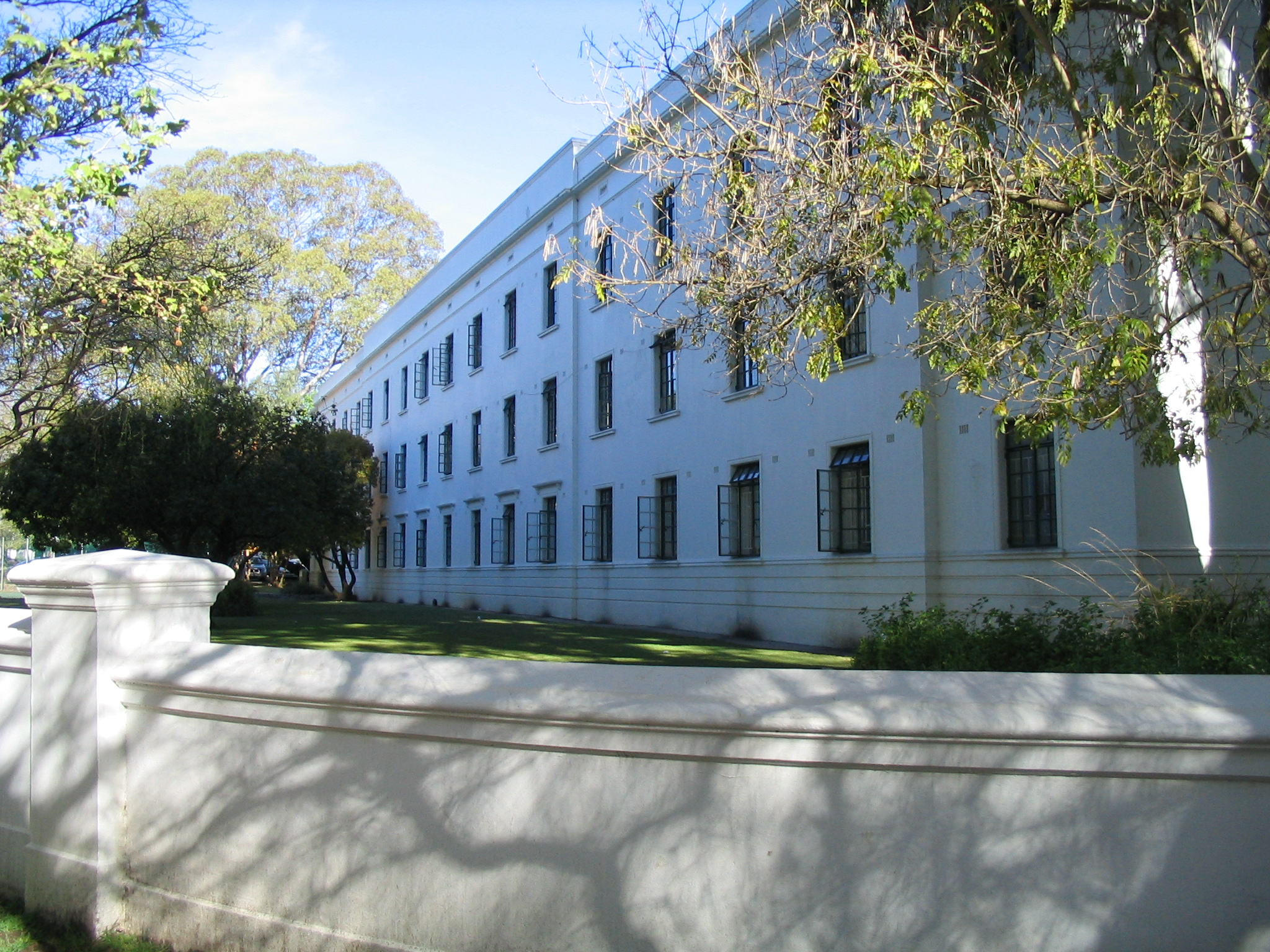
Wilgenhof residence, known as Bekfluitjie

Wilgenhof is a men's residence located in Stellenbosch, commonly referred by its residences as "Die Plek" (Afrikaans for "The Place"). The residence was established in 1903 which predates the official university status of Stellenbosch University. It was the oldest university men's residence in Africa, established in 1903. It served as a home for students at Stellenbosch University.

Notable alumni include former Constitutional Court Justice Edwin Cameron, anti-Apartheid activist Beyers Naudé, business leaders such as Christo Wiese, Michael Jordaan, Paul Harris, and Whitey Basson, and rugby players such as Danie Craven, Morné du Plessis, and Schalk Brits. The residence has come into controversy after News24 published information regarding two rooms within the residence which contained white supremacist paraphernalia and where it is alleged that students were tortured.

== History ==
=== Historical Overview of Die Plek ===
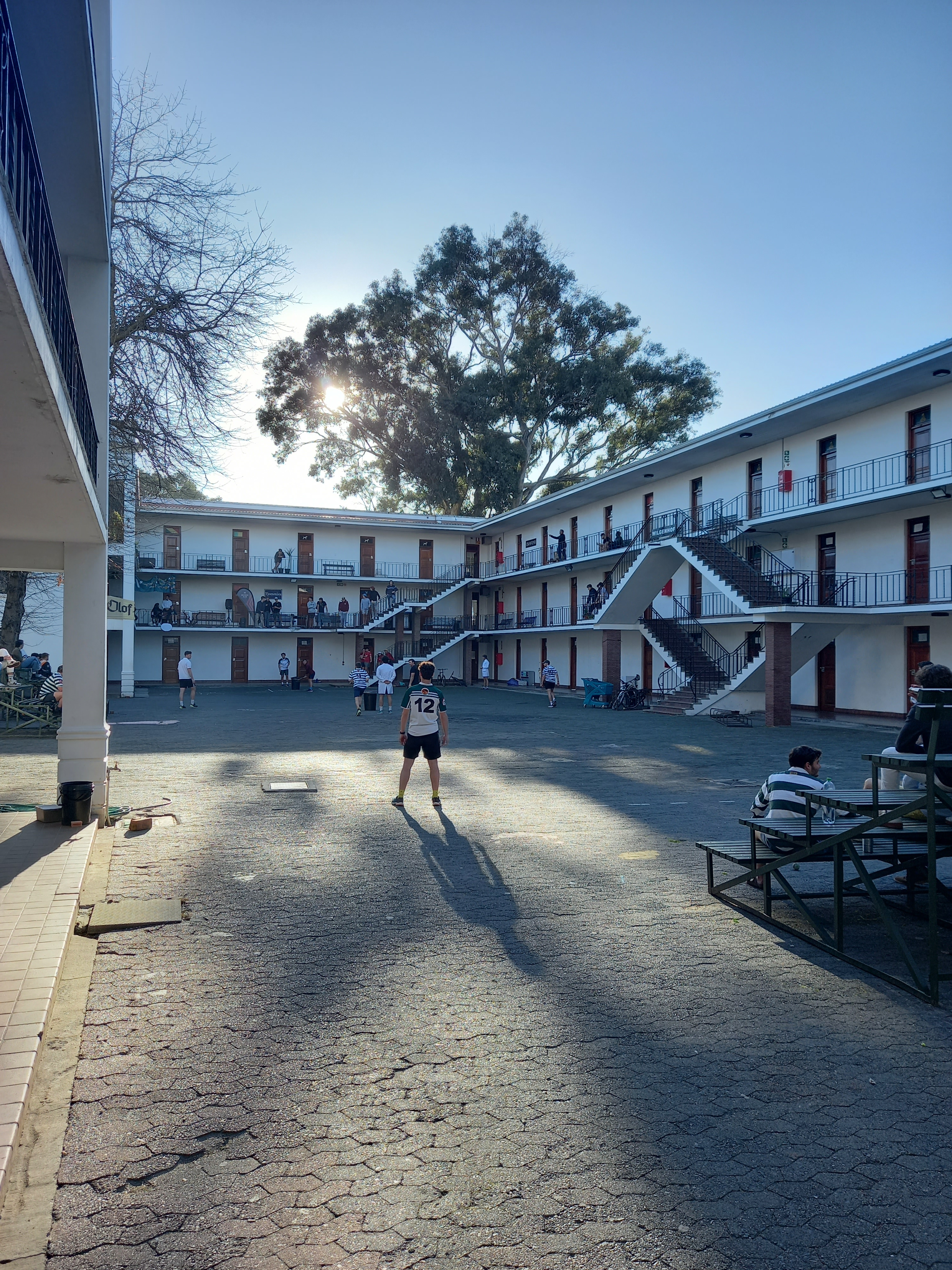

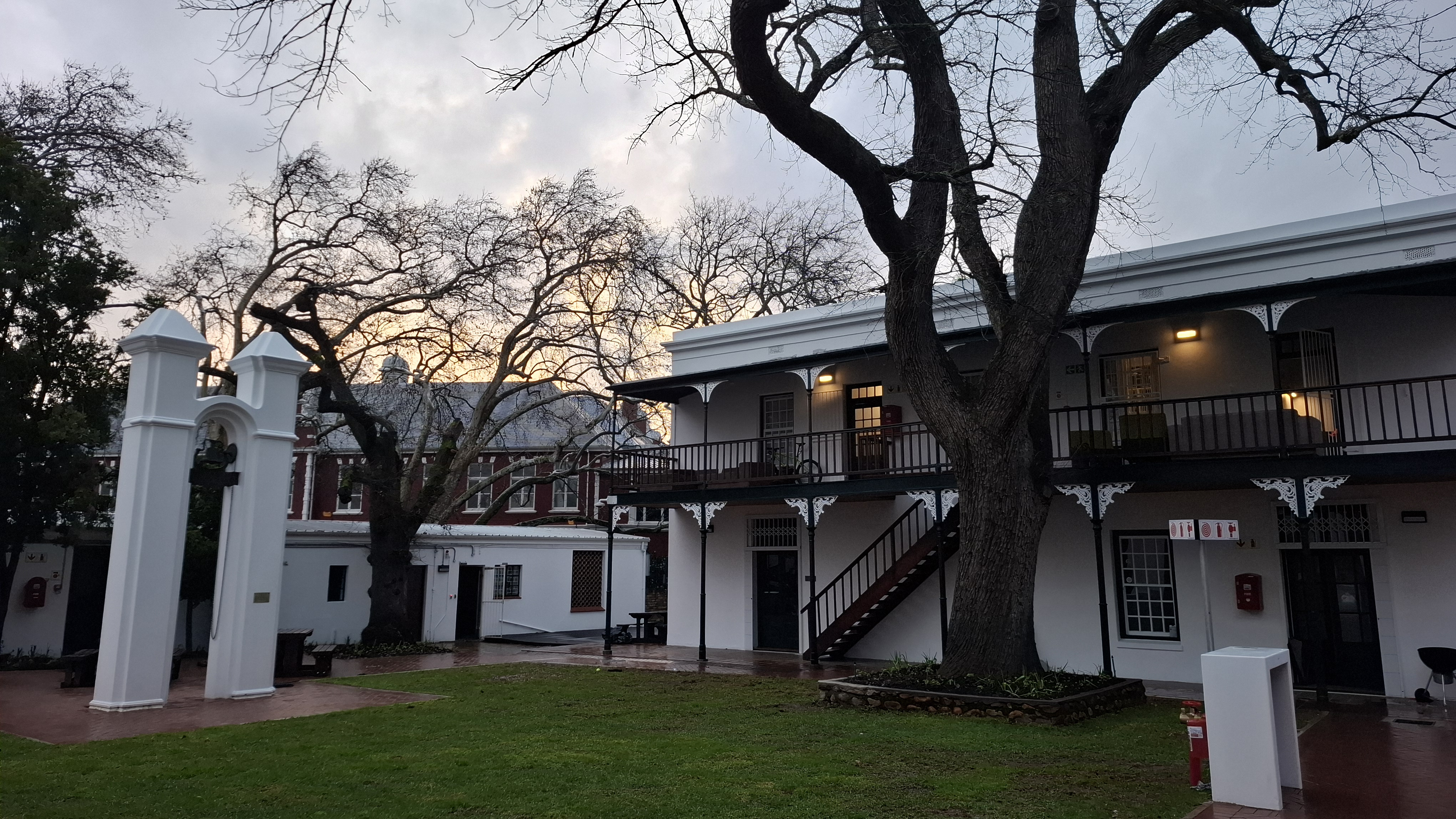

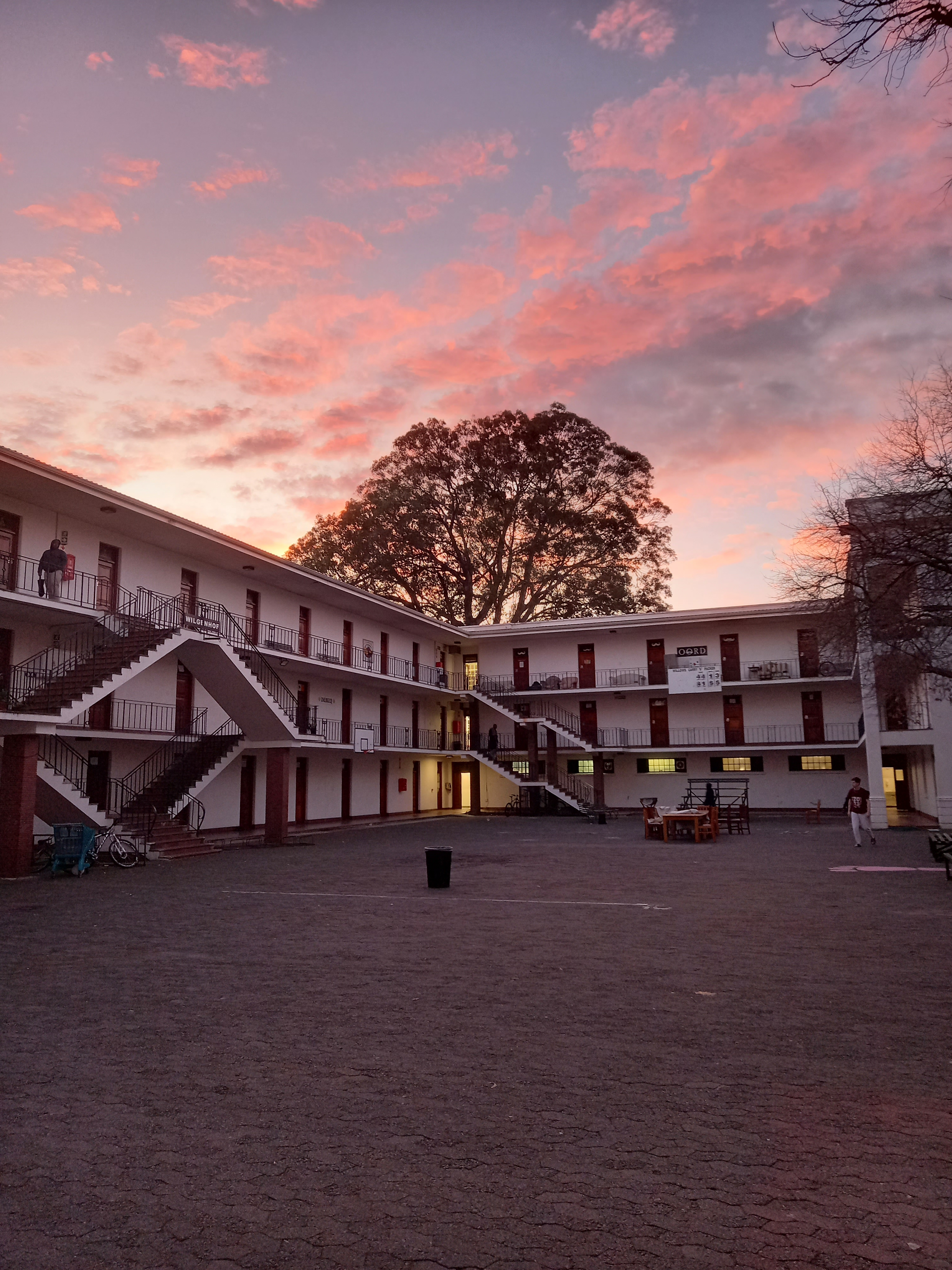

Die Plek was originally a farmhouse completed in 1799 in the British colony. It was known as the Old Bachelors building.

At that time, the road passed by the Old Bachelors building, as Ryneveld Street was not established until 1832.

In 1832, the Stellenbosch Spirit Association used the building as a distillery. The property was subsequently acquired by J.P. de Villiers in 1840, who renamed it Grossdale. The building was later known as 'Bosman se Stokery' (Bosman’s Distillery) or simply 'Die Stokery' (The Distillery), a designation that remains fitting to this day. Following various ownership changes and functional transformations, Roelof Louw added a second floor in 1875.

The name was changed to Willow Grove or simply The Willows, a name suggested by Louw’s wife. In 1902, Christiaan Marais acquired The Willows and significantly developed Wilgenhof starting in 1903. Wilgenhof was established as a residence for students from other parts of South Africa continuing their studies. The residence, initially accommodating 110 boarders, including Bachelors, saw its first Springbok rugby player, Bob Loubsher, in 1904. Notably, for a period spanning from 1904 to 1949, every Springbok test match featured a Wilgenhoffer.

Initiation practices for new residents commenced in 1906. Despite numerous changes in the initiation process and associated activities, the practice of initiation has remained a significant tradition at Wilgenhof. Tennis courts were built in 1906. Maintenance of these courts was initially the responsibility of newcomers and later taken over by the university in 1925. The courts were renovated in 2003, with notable contributions from Amanda Coetzer during their inauguration.

Wilgenhof’s tradition of ‘Big Nights’ began in 1910, accompanied by structural and regulatory changes over the subsequent years. The residence was purchased by Victoria College (predecessor of Stellenbosch University) in 1916 for 6000 pounds, and it became university property in 1918 upon the creation of Stellenbosch University. By 1920, administrative control of the residence was assumed by the house committee. Notably, the South African hurdles champion Arrie van Heerden, who was a resident at the time, participated in the Olympic Games in Antwerp that year.

A significant event in 1924 was the rugby match between the "Rest of Stellenbosch" and "Hof der Wilgen". This match not only led to the creation of the residence's flag and badge but also its house song by Victor Potgieter. The victory, 12-9, marked the beginning of a rugby tradition at Wilgenhof, including winning the Sauer Trophy eight times.

The Troebadoers, later renamed the Kraaie, emerged in 1934 as Wilgenhof’s first serenade group.

In 1944, Hamelhof was constructed to house 17 senior Wilgenhoffers, while the matron and staff remained in Bachelors. By 1981, under the new resident head Hennie de Vos, the seniors moved to Bachelors, a situation that persists to this day.

Dr Danie Craven, a prominent figure in rugby, was named Visiting Head in 1949. At this time, the residence was in poor condition, prompting a fundraising campaign to save it from demolition. The 'Spirit of Willows,' a term coined by Oubaas Markotter, drove a successful campaign, culminating in a 15,000-pound donation, half of which was contributed by the university. The new building, incorporating a new floor and wing, was inaugurated in 1964.

In 1962, seventeen Wilgenhoffers embarked on the first Trans-Africa Tour, reaching as far north as Kilimanjaro. This tradition has continued with eight more tours having happened since, the most recent in 2024/25. The 2004 tour included a charitable aspect, benefiting landmine victim organizations. Wilgenhof is also involved in other community projects, such as ‘coke and buns,’ where students donate their lunch to a night shelter weekly.

Dr Craven served as Resident Head from 1967 until 1981, during which several changes occurred, including the construction of the 'slaweklok' (slave bell) and the renovation of various facilities. The centenary reunion in 2003 saw over a thousand former residents return to celebrate their time at Wilgenhof.

== Current events ==
On 22 January 2024, Stellenbosch University officials opened two locked rooms in the highly secretive Wilgenhof men's residence. The horrors discovered were revealed that week by News24.

However, this was not the first time that university officials had been informed of the goings on at the 120-year-old residence, where first years were forced to participate naked in abusive initiation rituals that would leave some traumatized for decades.

Students told News24 that the "strafkamer" or punishment room at the residence contained horrifying pictures of alleged abuse of students. To quote ""The staff members had to break down the doors of these two rooms, and what they found was truly horrific." Which included Executioner-hoods, nudity, and midnight punishments. The Wilgenhof Alumni Association claimed that items found by the university formed part of the residence's history and could be misunderstood "if not explained in correct historical context".

On 16 September 2024, News24 and the University announced that the residence will be closed from the 2025 academic year where it would be changed, and reopened in 2026 under a new name.

On 26 February 2025, the Wilgenhof Alumni Association and Stellenbosch University announced that they had reached an out-of-court settlement regarding the future of Wilgenhof. The Alumni Association had filed an application to review and set aside, among other decisions, the University Council's 16 September 2024 resolution to close Wilgenhof in its existing form and replace it with a reimagined men's residence. According to a joint statement, an impasse over the naming process for the residence was resolved, bringing the litigation to an end.
