= Russel Botman =

South African theologist

Russel Botman was the vice chancellor of Stellenbosch University between 2006 and 2014.

== Biography ==
Russel Botman was born in Bloemfontein. He earned his bachelor of arts degree, masters of theology degree, and then his doctoral degree from the University of the Western Cape. In 2000, Botman joined Stellenbosch University as a professor of practical theology and missiology. In 2002, he became the vice rector of the university. Four years later, in 2006, he became the rector of the university. In 2014, he died at the age of 60 and was replaced by Leopoldt van Huyssteen as the rector.
