= Shoprite Holdings =

South African supermarket chain

Shoprite Holdings Ltd
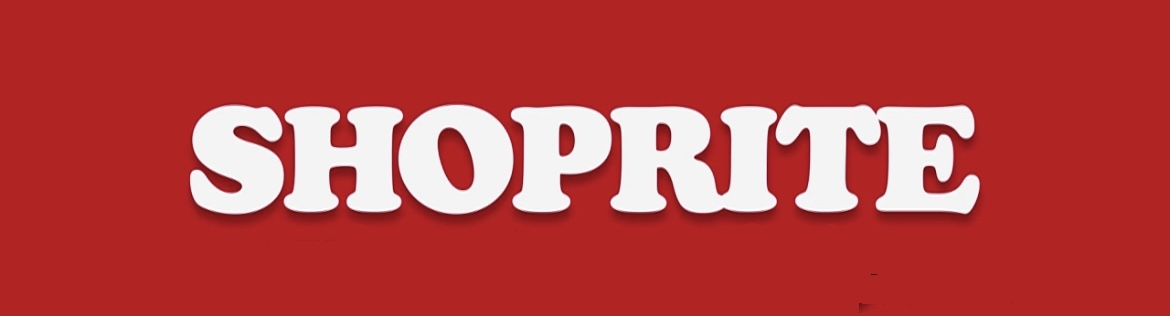
- Type: Public
- Traded as: JSE: SHP
- Industry: Retail
- Founded: 1979; 47 years ago
- Headquarters: Brackenfell, City of Cape Town, Western Cape, South Africa
- Number of locations: 3,721 (2026)
- Key people: P.C. Engelbrecht (CEO); Wendy Lucas-Bull (Chairperson)
- Revenue: ▲ R274.8 billion (2026)
- Operating income: ▲ R15.967 billion (2026)
- Net income: ▲ R7.930 billion (2026)
- Total assets: ▲ R130.789 billion (2026)
- Total equity: ▲ R33.616 billion (2026)
- Number of employees: Over 175,280 (2026)
- Divisions: Money Market; Xtra Savings; Shoprite Send; CredX; GetPaid
- Subsidiaries: Shoprite; Checkers; Vida e Caffè; House & Home; Computicket; Usave; Medrite; Transpharm; OK Franchise; OK Furniture; Red Star Wholesale; Rainmaker; Freshmark
- Website: www.shopriteholdings.co.za

Shoprite (officially Shoprite Holdings Ltd) is Africa's largest supermarket retailer, and one of the largest retail companies in the world. The company's headquarters are in Cape Town, South Africa, where it was founded in 1979.

Shoprite is a public company listed on the Johannesburg Stock Exchange and A2X Markets in South Africa, with secondary listings on both the Namibian and Lusaka stock exchanges.

The company operates major low-income supermarket chain USave, a separate low-income chain under its namesake, as well as two pharmacy chains - Medrite and Transpharm - furniture chain House & Home, the mid-to-high income Checkers chain, South Africa's largest ticketing provider, Computicket, SA's largest coffeehouse chain, Vida e Caffè, numerous financial services divisions, and various other businesses.

The group also manages a large property portfolio, comprising both owned and head-leased properties.

The Shoprite Group employs over 174,000 people, and is the largest private sector employer in South Africa. As of June 2026, Shoprite had 3,710 stores (including 573 franchise outlets) across 8 African countries (including South Africa), with 36.5 million Xtra Savings rewards customers visiting its stores.

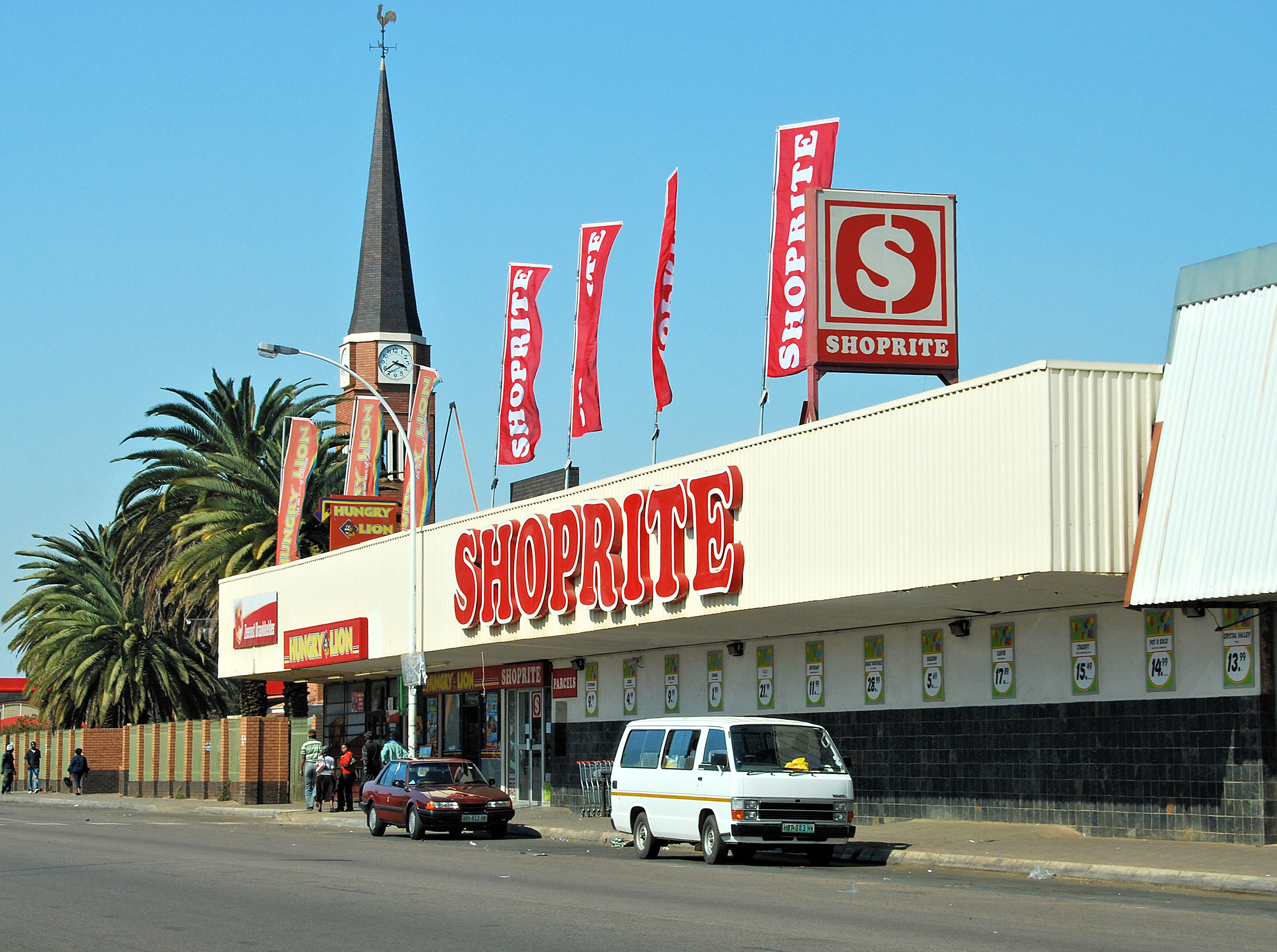
A Shoprite store in Zeerust

== History ==
International presence of Shoprite supermarkets

The Shoprite Group of companies was founded when PEP Stores' head of operations, Whitey Basson, purchased a small grocery company with eight stores from the Geller and Rogut families in 1979. In 1990 Shoprite opened its stores in Namibia. In 1991, it acquired the national Checkers chain.

In 1995 the first store in Lusaka, Zambia, was opened. That same year they acquired a centralised distribution company Sentra, which had been acting as a central buyer for 550 owner-managed supermarkets, thereby allowing Shoprite to expand into franchising.

In 1997 struggling OK Bazaars was acquired by the company from South African Breweries for one rand, adding 139 OK Bazaars stores and 18 Hyperamas to the company. In 2000 the group opened its first supermarkets in Zimbabwe and Uganda.

Two years later the company acquired the Madagascar stores of French chain Champion. The same year the company bought three Tanzanian supermarkets from Score Supermarket and opened its first hypermarket outside of South Africa in Mauritius. In 2005 the group acquired Foodworld as well as South African ticket seller Computicket, and opened the first Shoprite LiquorShop. The company also opened its first Nigerian store in the Victoria Island area of Lagos in December 2005.

In 2008 the Shoprite Group was added to the JSE Top-40 Index of blue-chips. In 2019 Shoprite won the Proudly South African Brand Award and was voted the best in the Grocery Store category as part of the Tiso-Blackstar/Sunday Times Top Brand Survey.

In 2011 it was announced that the Shoprite Group had entered into an agreement with Metcash Trading Africa (Pty) Limited. Under the terms of that agreement, the franchise division of Metcash was to be sold to Shoprite Checkers, including franchise arrangements with franchisees operating retail stores under registered trademark names such as Friendly and Seven Eleven.

On 19 April 2012, Shoprite became the first South African retailer to enter the Democratic Republic of Congo (DRC) as it opened the doors of a new supermarket in Gombe, Kinshasa.

Shoprite Holdings announced at the company's annual general meeting held on 31 October 2016 that the company's chief executive officer, Whitey Basson, had decided to retire at the end of December 2016. The board appointed Pieter Engelbrecht (born c. 1970), the former chief operating officer, as the incoming CEO as of 1 January 2017. He had been with the company for over 20 years and played a leading role in the company's growth under Basson's leadership.

Deloitte's Global Powers of Retailing 2019 (covering the 2017 financial year) ranked The Shoprite Group as the 86th largest retailer in the world.

By May 2019, the company had 1166 corporate stores in 16 countries across the world.

Shoprite Holdings was an owner of Hungry Lion until 2020.

In September 2021, Shoprite withdrew from Uganda, Madagascar and Kenya, citing financial losses. In 2022, Shoprite also exited the Congolese market.

In October 2024, the group announced that it had opened 68 stores in Africa, including 53 stores in South Africa.

By 2025, Shoprite had 3,417 stores in 10 African countries. Adding on to the development of their multiple brands, the Shoprite Group was awarded the inaugural Grand Prix: Sustainability honour during the Brand Africa | 100 South Africa’s Best Brand rankings announcement in June 2025. This followed from an innovative step forward in the world of sustainability when they introduced the South Africa’s first fully recyclable potato bag in the previous month.

In 2026, Shoprite Holdings continued growing its footprint, opening a net 232 stores and increasing its workforce to more than 174,400 employees. The group accelerated growth in its digital and specialist retail businesses, with Checkers Sixty60 becoming one of South Africa's largest on-demand delivery platforms and Petshop Science expanding to 185 stores.

During the year, the company also broadened its interests beyond traditional food retail, through investments in financial services, and the acquisition of South Africa's largest coffeehouse chain by number of stores, Vida e Caffè.

== Brands ==
Shoprite Holdings Limited comprises the following entities:

Name	Description
Shoprite	The group's original and flagship brand and the biggest food retailer in Africa
Usave	Usave offers basic goods at stripped-to-the-bone prices, focusing on lower-income markets
Checkers and Checkers Hyper	Standard size and large format (Hyper) supermarkets catering to middle and high income consumers
Checkers Foods	A smaller format store, focusing on convenience
Shoprite LiquorShop and Checkers LiquorShop	Shoprite and Checkers LiquorShop stores provide alcoholic and non-alcoholic beverages.
Checkers Sixty60	Checkers Sixty60 is an on-demand service that delivers alcohol and groceries within an hour, and at the same prices as in-store.
Pingo	A wholly owned subsidiary of the Shoprite Group that provides last-mile delivery services to Sixty60’s fast-growing on-demand platform across South Africa.
Petshop Science	A specialist pet shop that sells a comprehensive range of specialist pet products and food at supermarket prices.
Little Me	A standalone store where parent-customers can find baby brands at supermarket prices.
Uniq Clothing by Checkers	Uniq clothing by Checkers is a standalone apparel brand that provides discerning customers with premium quality wardrobe basics.
Checkers Outdoor	A standalone store for nature enthusiasts offering premium and affordable outdoor brands.
House & Home	House & Home caters to consumers in need of homeware, furniture, electrical appliances and more.
OK Furniture	The OK Furniture brand offers furniture, electrical appliances and more to middle-income communities.
Rainmaker Media	A precision retail media agency that creates campaigns using data, not guesswork
K’nect	Cellular products and related services. In 2021, the group launched its own mobile network, K'nect mobile, under this brand.
Medirite	Medirite Pharmacy provides accessible and affordable healthcare to customers across all income levels.
Transpharm	Transpharm Pharmaceutical Wholesalers distributes pharmaceuticals and surgical equipment across South Africa via Shoprite Holdings' distribution centres.
OK Franchise division	The OK Franchise division franchises different retail formats (OK Foods, OK MiniMark, OK Express, OK Grocer, OK Urban and President Hyper); a liquor outlet, OK Liquor; and a wholesale outlet, Megasave.
Red Star Wholesale and Catering Services	Red Star Wholesale and Catering Services (formerly known as Checkers Food Services) delivers products to the catering and hospitality industries.
Computicket	Computicket is the largest ticketing service provider in South Africa, specialising in tickets for business, entertainment and travel.
Freshmark	Freshmark is responsible for the group's fruit and vegetable procurement and supplying fresh fruit and vegetables to its stores across South Africa and other parts of Africa.

In many of its stores, Shoprite Holdings sells products under house brands, including Checkers house brand, Forage & Feast, Homegrown, Lovies, Simple Truth, Ubrand, Ritebrand, Championship Boerewors, Pot O' Gold, and healthy kids meal brand Oh My Goodness, which was co-developed by chef Gordon Ramsay and his daughter, Matilda.

== See also ==
- Retailing in South Africa

Business positions
Preceded by Whitey Basson	CEO of Shoprite, P.C. Engelbrecht; 2017 – present
