= Clare McCabe =

American chemical engineer

- Education: University of Sheffield
- Scientific career
- Workplaces: Vanderbilt University; Colorado School of Mines
- Thesis: Statistical mechanics of chain molecules (1999)

Clare McCabe is a British-American-Irish chemical engineer who is Bicentennial Professor in the School of Engineering and Physical Sciences at Heriot-Watt University in Edinburgh. She was elected Fellow of the American Association for the Advancement of Science in 2019. Her research makes use of molecular modelling to understand the properties of biological systems, fluids and nanomaterials.

== Early life and education ==
McCabe completed her undergraduate training in the United Kingdom. She first specialised in chemistry at the University of Sheffield, and then concentrated on physical chemistry for her doctoral research.

== Research and career ==
In 2002, McCabe joined the faculty at the Colorado School of Mines as an assistant professor. She joined Vanderbilt University in 2004 as an assistant professor of chemical engineering, and was promoted to associate professor in 2007 and full professor in 2011; in 2017, she was awarded a chaired professorship as Cornelius Vanderbilt Professor of Engineering. She moved to Heriot-Watt University in Edinburgh, Scotland in 2022. Her early research considered ionic liquids. In particular, McCabe sought to develop a framework that allowed the modelling and simulation of ionic liquids, both as neat materials and in blend systems.

McCabe is interested in lipid self-assembly, nanoscale tribology and molecular thermodynamics. She makes use of molecular modelling and better understand real-world applications.

== Awards and honours ==
- 2011 Madison Sarratt Prize for Excellence in Undergraduate Teaching
- 2014 Vanderbilt Institute for Nanoscience and Engineering Distinguished Service Award
- 2016 American Institute of Chemical Engineers Computational Molecular Science and Engineering Forum (CoMSEF) Impact Award
- 2018 Chancellor's Award for Research
- 2019 Elected Fellow of the American Association for the Advancement of Science
- 2025 Guggenheim Medal of the IChemE
- 2025 John M. Prausnitz Award

== Selected publications ==
- Rivera, José L.; McCabe, Clare; Cummings, Peter T. (1 August 2003). "Oscillatory Behavior of Double-Walled Nanotubes under Extension: A Simple Nanoscale Damped Spring". Nano Letters. 3 (8): 1001–1005. Bibcode:2003NanoL...3.1001R. doi:10.1021/nl034171o. ISSN 1530-6984.
- McCabe, Clare; Jackson, George (1999). "SAFT-VR modelling of the phase equilibrium of long-chain n-alkanes". Physical Chemistry Chemical Physics. 1 (9): 2057–2064. Bibcode:1999PCCP....1.2057M. doi:10.1039/A808085B.
- Rivera, José L.; McCabe, Clare; Cummings, Peter T. (16 January 2003). "Molecular simulations of liquid-liquid interfacial properties: Water--n-alkane and water-methanol--n-alkane systems". Physical Review E. 67 (1) 011603. Bibcode:2003PhRvE..67a1603R. doi:10.1103/PhysRevE.67.011603. PMID 12636510.
