= List of shopping centres in Namibia =

This is a list of shopping centres in Namibia with at least two anchor tenants such as supermarkets, hypermarkets, multicinemas, and department stores.

Modern shopping centres in Namibia are often called malls, even when they do not meet the definition of a mall by the International Council of Shopping Centers, which is 300,000 square feet (28,000 m^{2}) by the smallest definition, which is the definition for Canadian malls.

City	Name	Gross Leasable Area in sq. m.	Opened	Anchors	Developer(s)
Windhoek	Maerua Mall	54,128 m^{2} (582,630 ft^{2})		Ackermans, @home, Total Sports, cinema, Virgin Active gym.	
Windhoek CBD	Wernhil Shopping Centre	54,000 m^{2} (580,000 ft^{2})		Pick n Pay, Food Lovers Market, Checkers, Ackermans, Pep Store, Mr Price Home	
Windhoek (Kleine Kuppe)	Grove Mall orig. The Grove Mall of Namibia	52,089 m^{2} (560,680 ft^{2})	October 2014	Game, Checkers, SPAR), Woolworths, Edgars	Atterbury
Walvis Bay	Dunes Mall	25,000 m^{2} (270,000 ft^{2})	2017	Pick n Pay (2700 sqm), Checkers (3500 sqm), House and Home (1800 sqm) Woolworths (1700 sqm), Dischem (1500 sqm), Game, Mr Price. 80 shops.	Atterbury, Tradehold
Windhoek (Kleine Kuppe)	MegaCentre	17,686 m^{2} (190,370 ft^{2})		Pick n Pay, WestPack Lifestyle Mega Store	
Rundu	Rundu Mall	13,699 m^{2} (147,450 ft^{2})	2015	Shoprite, Edgars Active, Jetmart, Pep	
