= Markus Jooste =

South African businessman (1961–2024)

- Born: Markus Johannes Jooste; 22 January 1961; Pretoria, South Africa
- Died: 21 March 2024 (aged 63); Hermanus, South Africa
- Education: Afrikaanse Hoër Seunskool (Affies)
- Alma mater: Stellenbosch University, University of Cape Town
- Occupation: Businessman
- Title: CEO, Steinhoff International
- Spouse: Ingrid Jooste
- Children: 3

Markus Johannes Jooste (22 January 1961 – 21 March 2024) was a South African businessman and the CEO of Steinhoff International. He was an avid horse breeder, and in 2016 was reported to be one of Africa's richest people, worth $400 million. Joining forces with Christo Wiese in 2014, they embarked on an aggressive international expansion programme. The share price of their conglomerate reached a peak in March 2016, favouring their strategy of paying for dividends and acquisitions by sales of stock.

Following a dispute with business partner Andreas Seifert, European regulators, journalists and law enforcement were alerted to the conglomerate's inflated profit and asset values, besides off-balance-sheet deals with third parties, causing Deloitte LLP to demand an internal investigation before the 2017 financials would be signed off. Jooste resisted this demand and could not convince the Steinhoff board to appoint new auditors. Jooste submitted his resignation on 5 December 2017, followed by Wiese 9 days later when a large investor, PIC, called for independent oversight.

Jooste's sudden resignation was followed by an involved and protracted controversy concerning Steinhoff's accounting practices in its Central European business dating back to 2014. The resulting uncertainty saw some €10 billion (R160 billion) of Steinhoff's value wiped off the markets in a matter of days, with continuing losses as the situation unfolded. Insurmountable debts and claims would lead to Steinhoff's demise in 2023.

The ensuing 3,000 or 7,000 page PwC investigation directly linked Jooste and his CFO Ben la Grange to widespread fictitious transactions and accounting irregularities resulting in the Stellenbosch-headquartered company claiming R870 million from Jooste and R272 million from Ben la Grange in a summons lodged at the high court in Cape Town, which aimed to recoup salaries as well as bonuses. Aided by the Panama Papers, some journalists contend that insider trading had occurred since Steinhoff's listing in 1998, and that the company's top brass had acted on both sides of several deals. Leveraged Steinhoff shares served as currency to remunerate third parties, while shareholder value was diluted to acquisitions in which Jooste and a circle of associates had allegedly acquired prior stakes.

As South Africa's Hawks investigative unit admitted to making no progress at all, while the NPA lacked the in-house skills to address crimes of this nature, criminal charges were not forthcoming. The ruinous impact on pension funds caused some South African lawmakers to express dismay at the lack of prosecution, and some demanded arrests of the culpable parties without delay. The JSE has meanwhile found Jooste guilty of two contraventions of listing requirements, and imposed a maximum fine of R15 million on him personally, while barring him from acting as a director of a listed company for a period of 20 years.

== Early life ==
Markus Jooste was born on 22 January 1961. His father was a postal worker and an avid horse race punter, instilling also in his son an interest in the races. Jooste matriculated from Afrikaanse Hoër Seunskool in 1978. Before the 2017 fallout in his business empire, he donated R10 million to the school's old-boys trust in his personal capacity. The donation has since been ring-fenced pending possible claims.

Jooste obtained a BAcc degree from Stellenbosch University in 1982, and subsequently obtained an honours degree at the University of Cape Town while completing his CA(SA) articles where one of his audit clients was a company then owned by Christo Wiese.

== Career ==
After training as a chartered accountant in his 20s, he was appointed financial director of a publicly listed company. At age 27 he became the financial director of GommaGomma, where he met German entrepreneur Claas Daun, who coached him in business. On his part, Jooste convinced Daun in 1998 to merge his business with that of Bruno Steinhoff in Europe, and to list Steinhoff International on the JSE. Jooste and Daun acted as non-executive directors of Steinhoff International from 1988, and Jooste became its CEO in 2000. In his role as CEO, he built the company through numerous acquisitions from a small furniture manufacturer to a large corporation in the furniture industry. Piet Ferreira, a former investment banker who joined Steinhoff in 2002, was instrumental in structuring its public offerings and complex acquisitions during his 15-year tenure.

Notably, they acquired Conforama in 2011 for €1,207-million, a deal that boosted revenues and growth. 2014 through 2017 saw acquisitions in South Africa, the United Kingdom and United States, which included Mattress Firm for $2.4bn, and Poundland for £597m in depressed retail conditions. Despite being partially funded with Steinhoff shares, the very large premium paid for Mattress Firm prompted scrutiny by independent analysts. The financial press initially ascribed the growth in Jooste's empire to either good luck or fortuitous timing, but the dissenting voices grew silent as Steinhoff raked in 36% growth in its 2014/2015 reporting year.

In March 2015 Steinhoff bought Pepkor from Wiese and his Brait holding company at R63 billion (then €4.8 billion), implying a very high p-e ratio of 37. After a failed merger with Shoprite in December 2016, Jooste and Wiese raised new capital in 2017 to split off Pepkor's South African division, a move received with some skepticism, as it was seen as a way to pay off Steinhoff's South African debt. The Pepkor acquisition also occurred without a cautionary announcement, raising suspicions at the FSB about possible insider trading leading up to the deal. The split implied a 71% holding in new entity, Star, which managed more than 5,000 South African stores, more than any other retailer.

In October 2015 Jooste treated some Stellenbosch colleagues, friends and associates to a lavish excursion to the semi-final of the Rugby World Cup at Twickenham Stadium, which is estimated to have cost Steinhoff shareholders some R84 million.

On 4 December 2015, Steinhoff announced that Oldenburg authorities had carried out a 26 November raid on its European headquarters in Westerstede, Germany, in order to review its balance sheet treatment of transfers to subsidiaries or third parties. Three days later, on 7 December, Steinhoff International Holdings transferred its primary listing from Johannesburg to Frankfurt, as, in Jooste's words, the majority of the firm's stores, customers and revenues were in Europe. Though describing it as "an important day in the history of Steinhoff", Jooste chose not to leave Cape Town to attend the event, citing "neck pain" which precluded travelling.

Steinhoff's share price peaked at R90 a share in 2016, making it the 15th largest company listed on the Johannesburg exchange. The conglomerate then owned over 40 retail outlets,. employed over 130,000 people on five continents, and had become the second-largest home goods retailer in Europe after Ikea. In 2017, while its stock was held by some 340 investment funds in South Africa, in part due to its low volatility, its financial position began to worsen as its operating profit margin fell and net debt increased. Its March 2017 accounts showed €3.1 billion in cash reserves, and €18 billion ($21 billion) of exposure to creditors.

Steinhoff limited its effective tax rate to between 8% and 12% for years, notwithstanding the company tax rate of 28% in South Africa, a fact pointed out as a red flag in the wake of the Steinhoff fallout.

Manager Magazin revealed in August 2017 that Jooste was one of the managers being investigated in Germany. Prosecutors suspected that inflated revenues in the hundred million Euro range may have been reported on the balance sheets of subsidiaries. Handelsblatt reported in November 2017 that investors had become decidedly wary of the nestled and intransparent company structure that Jooste had created. Financial Mail journalists, aided by the Panama Papers, alleged that Jooste had secret stakes in these daughter companies before they formally entered the Steinhoff fold, and that they were acquired at premiums to their value. They proposed that this network of front-running companies would have been set up and operated by George Alan Evans and Malcolm King.

On 4 December 2017, Steinhoff Holdings disclosed that it would release unaudited annual statements, and the next day Jooste resigned his position as CEO amid allegations of fraud and corruption. Soon after he also resigned from Phumelela Gaming & Leisure, Kenilworth Racing, and Mayfair Speculators. Jooste also submitted his resignation as chartered accountant, but SAICA rejected it, preferring instead to suspend him pending the outcome of disciplinary proceedings. According to Jooste, who was drawing a salary of R2,5 million ($190,000) a month at the time, the Steinhoff board had disagreed with his plan to find new auditors to sign off on the financials.

=== Steinhoff scandal ===
I am done with fighting, Ben, and when one's life is made so bare it becomes f__ difficult to explain everything. Sorry for all the European entries that you don't know anything about, were not involved in and don't understand. At tomorrow's audit meeting I'll take you through each and explain why we did it that way. As you can imagine tax is the main consideration.

— E-mail by Jooste to his CFO Ben la Grange in December 2017 – Jooste would skip the audit meeting and resign, Revealed in a 2023 judgment of the Financial Services Tribunal

Manager Magazin reported in August 2017 that Jooste was being investigated by German authorities. In response Steinhoff's price slumped by 16% on the JSE, but recovered after the company denied the allegations. This was followed by allegations of accounting impropriety made by Steinhoff's former POCO subsidiary. Steve Booysen also alerted the board to possible accounting irregularities after engagements with Deloitte.

Jooste's December 2017 resignation as CEO of Steinhoff came as the company admitted to "accounting irregularities" within the group, and announced that it had approached PwC to conduct an investigation into these. Chairwoman Heather Sonn revealed later that Steinhoff’s proprietary electronic records had been destroyed, complicating their investigation. In a letter to staff on his resignation, Jooste apologized for "big mistakes" and that he had caused bad publicity for the company. In an SMS sent on 6 December to former Steinhoff director Jo Grove, Jooste supposedly admitted that he had tried to cover up the impact of losses incurred by Steinhoff's American assets. Viceroy Research immediately tweeted a link to its 37-page report which detailed how Steinhoff had allegedly used off-balance-sheet entities to obfuscate losses and inflate earnings.

Between 5 and 7 December Steinhoff's share price plunged from R46.25 to R10, and its bonds fell in line as Moody's downgraded Steinhoff bonds from investment grade (Baa3) to junk (B1). Christo Wiese's Upington Investment Holdings held over 30% of Steinhoff's stock and was the biggest loser in the collapse. South Africa's PIC (holding 7%), Coronation and BlackRock all made multi-billion rand losses. The European Central Bank sold its Steinhoff bonds after these had depreciated by 50%, while JPMorgan, Bank of America, Citigroup and Goldman Sachs all reported substantial loan losses. Lenders were owed over €9 billion ($10.6 billion), but in June 2018 the majority were persuaded to a debt standstill and insolvency was avoided.

It was soon labeled as the biggest corporate scandal in South African history and the biggest corporate crash in the country's history. As a result of Jooste's resignation, $11.4 billion was wiped off the value of the global furniture and clothing retailer. This in turn had a ripple effect on several other companies, including its subsidiary Steinhoff Africa Retail (Star), which may have guaranteed some of Steinhoff's debt. In seven days of trading, the Johannesburg exchange was hit by losses totaling about R295 billion ($24 billion), equivalent to 8% of South Africa's GDP.

Steinhoff's share price dipped to R4.50 (down from R51.40 on 1 December) when the company's accumulated debt of R161 billion ($12.8 billion) was revealed. By late December, Steinhoff shares were on the brink of collapse, as management could not ascertain the magnitude of accounting irregularities, or provide assurances concerning individual companies' cash flows. Steinhoff however won approval to roll over €690m of its financing, and its US subsidiary Mattress Firm secured a loan of $225m from Barclays. Steinhoff also sold PSG shares worth R4.7 billion to increase liquidity.

Steinhoff's consolidated statements for October 2016 to September 2017 were eventually released in May 2019, and these included restatements of its financials for 2014–15 as well as 2015–16. The supposed €1.4 billion net profit for its 2015–16 financial year was restated as a loss of €237 million. The FSCA reacted to this admission of false and misleading statements by imposing a R1.5 billion fine on the company, which was later reduced to R53 million and paid without contest. The JSE, relying in part on the 11-page summary of Steinhoff's proprietary PwC report, found Jooste guilty of two contraventions of listing requirements, and imposed a maximum fine of R15 million on him personally, while barring him from acting as a director of a listed company for a period of 20 years. These rulings were upheld by the FSCA in 2023.

In the wake of the scandal reports revealed that Jooste's hard-nosed executive style earned him a nickname, "the seagull", as he would "fly in and shit all over his subordinates before flying out." Media articles also identified his supposed mistress who occupied a luxury apartment in Bantry Bay, owned by Malcolm King.

=== Investigations and litigation ===
PwC was tasked with an investigation into possible accounting irregularities or non-compliance with laws and regulations, and resumption of audited statements were subject to its outcome. German prosecutors confirmed in December 2017 that they were still investigating four current and former managers of a group (identified in the German press as Steinhoff), for accounting fraud. Steinhoff announced in February 2018 that they had submitted a report on Jooste to the Hawks on suspicion of fraud, for investigation and potential prosecution.

Christo Wiese's Titan Group instituted a claim of R59 billion ($4.8 billion) against the Steinhoff conglomerate to recover cash investments made in 2015 and 2016. The prospects of this claim are however complicated by the fact that Wiese had been Steinhoff director since 2013. Wiese had a 22% shareholding in Steinhoff, the European component of which appears to have been subject to margin loans with different banks.

In December 2017 Absa Bank and Investec Plc applied for the liquidation of Mayfair Speculators, when Mayfair's Steinhoff shares failed to provide sufficient collateral for its overdraft facilities. Absa, who was owed R350 million, expressed suspicion about R1.5 billion of assets that were transferred as a dividend in specie to Mayfair's holding company in August 2017. According to court documents, Mayfair owed Sanlam capital markets, Investec Plc and Absa more than R1.2 billion ($94 million) in total. Mayfair disclosed liabilities of R1 billion and assets worth R350 million. The Western Cape High Court postponed the banks' application, and the lenders subsequently agreed to grant Mayfair extension until the end of 2018 to facilitate a favourable disposal of its real estate and racehorses. Lenders held Mayfair accountable for R2.08 billion in total.

In June 2018, a Dutch shareholders association, VEB, filed for damages against Deloitte in Rotterdam, for their failure in vetting the accounts of retailer Steinhoff Int. NV. The association planned to hold the directors, company, accountants, and potentially the banks that promoted Steinhoff's listing, jointly responsible.

The German raid of 2015 recovered documents supposedly signed by Andreas Seifert, co-managing director of furniture chain XXXLutz. Seifert denied ever having seen or signed the papers, and filed criminal charges for document forgery. After filing additional lawsuits against Steinhoff in three countries, Seifert managed in April 2018 formalize his controlling stake in POCO, which Steinhoff disputed.

In August 2018 a claim of R740 million was instituted against Jooste and his former colleague Ben la Grange by Jaap du Toit and the trustees of Le Toit Trust. The claim relates to PSG shares which Du Toit swapped for Steinhoff shares in 2015.

When Jooste appeared before South African members of parliament in September 2018, he denied knowledge of any accounting irregularities on Steinhoff's part. He stated that Deloitte's independence became compromised in Steinhoff's dealings with Andreas Seifert, causing him (Jooste) to recommend appointment of new auditors, and the delay of the release date of audited results to the end of January 2018. In Jooste's view this would have warded off financial disaster in the group. Jooste stated that from 2015 onwards, Andreas Seifert managed to convince German authorities to conduct various tax investigations into Steinhoff, besides attempting to manipulate public prosecutors, capital market regulators and the press to gain information on Steinhoff, whereby the outcome of ongoing civil litigations between Seifert and Steinhoff in three countries could be affected.

In August 2019, Jooste was represented by lawyer Callie Albertyn of DKVG and advocates Jeremy Muller and Matthew Blumberg at his first court trial when Steinhoff aimed to recoup salaries and bonusses paid to Jooste and La Grange.

On 4 March 2021, German prosecutors in Oldenburg revealed that Markus Jooste and three others had been secretly charged four months earlier with the first indictments from the German investigations.

== Personal life ==
Jooste was married to Ingrid, and they had a son and two daughters. He lived in Stellenbosch.

=== Horse trainer and breeder ===
Jooste's racing silks

Jooste entered the horse racing industry in the 1990s with 250 horses, and became the second biggest horse-racing investor in Africa, and a leading investor worldwide. Jooste and his son in law, Stefan Potgieter, managed their horse racing interests through Mayfair Speculators, a wholly owned subsidiary of Mayfair Holdings that was founded in 1987. In 2004, Jooste became a partner in Klawervlei Stud, together with Johan du Plessis, Danie van der Merwe and John Koster, and they chose the four-leaf clover as their emblem. In the next decade other prominent investors joined the enterprise.

Jooste's first horse, the stallion National Emblem, was bought for R100,000 in 1993 and became a champion. Mayfair Speculators owned South Africa's best racehorse, Legal Eagle, a six-time Grade 1 winner, and Edict Of Nantes, a dual Grade 1 winner. They were sold in December 2017 for R3.2 million and R9.9 million respectively. In 2016, The conglomerate won the Durban July as an outsider.

Jooste, in various partnerships, was a regular buyer at racing sales. In 2014 he impressed with his buying power at Arqana's premium sale in Deauville. In 2015, he added 12 yearlings to his stables at Tattersalls, for a total of £4.3 million. In September 2017, Mayfair acquired 9 yearlings at the yearling sale in county Kildare, Ireland for €2.3 million in total. In partnership with MV Magnier, they bought a filly at Tattersalls for £1.68 million in October 2017. Later that year he was named Equus SA's racehorse owner of the year for the 10th time in a row.

By December 2017, Mayfair Speculators owned 350 horses in training, 100 mares for breeding, a considerable property portfolio, a 49% share in Klawervlei horse-breeding farm at Bonnievale, and Steinhoff shares which were used as collateral. Mayfair Speculators was also a shareholder in Cape Thoroughbred Sales (CTS), of which Jooste was a director.

== Death ==
Jooste died by suicide on 21 March 2024 near his home in Hermanus. The suicide occurred a day before he was to hand himself over to law enforcement.
