= Maerua Mall =

Coordinates: 22°35′01″S 17°05′37″E

- Location: Windhoek, Khomas, Namibia
- Floor area: 54,128 m^{2} (582,630 sq ft)
- Website: www.maeruamall.com

Maerua Mall is a shopping complex in Windhoek, Namibia. Expanded to more than double its original size in 2006 by Concor Construction, Maerua Mall is now the third largest shopping mall in Namibia and contains a number of retail outlets, including Ackermans, @home, FNB, Total Sports, Stuttafords. Along with Wernhil Park Mall and Grove Mall, the malls are the largest formal shopping venues in Namibia.

Maerua mall lies opposite Centaurus High School in Windhoek. It is one of the two malls in Namibia which contains a cinema and a Virgin Active gym. Maerua has various restaurants including Wimpy, Mugg & Bean and Panarottis.
