= Christo Wiese =

South African businessman (born 1941)

- Born: Christoffel Hendrik Wiese; 10 September 1941 (age 84); Upington, Cape Province; Union of South Africa
- Education: Paarl Boys' High School
- Alma mater: Stellenbosch University
- Spouse: Caro Wiese (m. 1975)
- Children: 3, including Jacob
- Relatives: Japie Basson (father-in-law)

Christoffel Hendrik Wiese (born 10 September 1941) is a South African billionaire businessman who was the longtime chairman of Shoprite and Pepkor. He was also the chairman and largest shareholder of Steinhoff International until its collapse in December 2017.

Trained as a lawyer, Wiese entered discount consumer retail in 1981 when he acquired a controlling interest in Pep Stores from a family member. Though he is no longer the majority shareholder in Shoprite or Pep, he retains significant interests in both companies, as well as in mining and real estate.

== Early life and education ==
Wiese was born on 10 September 1941 in Upington, South Africa, where his father owned a sheep and cattle farm and a car dealership. He matriculated at Paarl Boys' High School and initially enrolled at the University of Cape Town but dropped out without completing his programme. After a hiatus in Upington, where he started a radiator repair business, he resumed his studies at Stellenbosch University and graduated in 1967 with a Bachelor of Arts and Bachelor of Laws. On the Stellenbosch campus he lived at Wilgenhof.

== Business career ==
While Wiese was at Stellenbosch, his parents co-founded Pep Stores in Upington in 1965. After his graduation, Wiese spent several years working as an executive director for the family business during a period of rapid expansion. In 1974, however, he moved to Cape Town, where he married and worked at the Cape Bar with a practice in criminal and commercial law. He remained involved in business, buying a diamond mine in Richtersveld in 1976, and he ran unsuccessfully for election to Parliament in 1977, standing as a candidate for the opposition Progressive Federal Party in the Simonstown constituency. In 1981, he sold the Richtersveld mine and bought his cousin out of Pep Stores, which had acquired Shoprite for R1 million in 1979 and which by then had 450 locations nationwide; Wiese acquired a controlling 44-per-cent stake in Pep Stores and became its chairman.

Pep (renamed Pepkor Limited in 1982) was tremendously successful in the discount retail market over the next two decades, buoyed in part by the de facto protectionism produced by international sanctions against the apartheid government. Wiese later described the company as "the Wal-Mart of Africa," saying, "The business has basically been built on one slogan: Low prices you can trust." In 1986, Pepkor acquired the clothing chain Ackermans and spun out Pepkor's food interests, listing Shoprite Holdings Limited separately on the JSE alongside the clothing interests of PEP Limited; Wiese maintained control of both public companies. In 1991 Pepkor acquired Smart Group Holdings, Cashbuild, Checkers, and Stuttafords. Pepkor also purchased the loss-making OK Bazaars from South African Breweries for one rand in 1997.

=== British investments ===
Weise's private equity company, Brait, holds several investments in British companies, beginning with a 2012 investment in Iceland Foods. In April 2015, Brait bought 80 per cent of Virgin Active from Richard Branson's Virgin Group, and it bought 90 per cent of New Look later the same year. Wiese told press that he had looked abroad because antitrust policy restricted his further expansion in the South African retail market.

=== Steinhoff scandal ===
In March 2012, Wiese became a shareholder and director of German-listed Steinhoff International as part of the sale of his five-star vineyard hotel, the Lanzerac Manor and Winery, which he had owned since 1991. The deal, reported in the media as a sale to a foreign consortium, was spearheaded by Steinhoff executive Markus Jooste, who was Wiese's personal friend. Two years later, in November 2014, Steinhoff acquired 92.34 per cent of Pepkor, buying Wiese's 52.47 per cent stake and Brait's 37.06 per cent stake. In exchange Weise acquired 19.7 per cent of Steinhoff, and in 2016 he became chairman of Steinhoff after buying further shares to finance its acquisition of Mattress Firm. By the end of the 2016 financial year, he was the largest single shareholder of both Steinhoff (23 per cent) and Shoprite (16.9 per cent), and he publicly supported proposals to merge the companies' interests.

Wiese was Steinhoff chairman in December 2017 when Steinhoff admitted to massive accounting fraud, resulting in Jooste's resignation as chief executive. Wiese initially took over as acting chief executive, but a week later he announced that he would step down from the board entirely. His net worth reportedly fell by over $3 billion in subsequent weeks as Steinhoff's share price plummeted. Four large international lenders – Goldman Sachs, JP Morgan, Citigroup, and Bank of America – also reported large losses on written-down margin loans to Wiese, though the loans were ringfenced around his Steinhoff shares. Summoned to the South African Parliament to answer questions about the scandal, Wiese testified that revelations of the fraud had been like "a bolt from the blue." Jooste later claimed that Wiese had in fact had earlier notice of the fraud.

In April 2018, Weise's company, Titan, sued to cancel R59 billion in Steinhoff share purchases, which he alleged were the result of fraud; the case settled in early 2022, with Wiese receiving R3 billion in cash and a per cent stake in Pepkor valued at over R4 billion. Absent from the Forbes Billionaire List since 2018, Wiese regained dollar-billionaire status in 2023.

=== Shoprite leadership ===
In the aftermath of the Steinhoff collapse, Wiese reduced his holdings in Shoprite by about a third; by October 2019, he held 10.7 per cent of the company, a smaller share than the Government Employees Pension Fund, though he retained control of the board through deferred shares with special voting rights. The company remained highly profitable.

In November 2019, Wiese used his special voting rights to gain reappointment as Shoprite chairman, notwithstanding the opposition of shareholders who controlled over 60 per cent of ordinary shares, but he stepped down as chairman in November 2020, replaced by Wendy Lucas-Bull. He remained chairman of Invicta Holdings and TradeHold, and in 2024 he told press that he was focusing on his mining interests in Trans Hex Group Limited.

== Financial controversies ==
In April 2009, the United Kingdom Border Agency confiscated some £675 000 (about R7.2 million) from Wiese at London City Airport, where Wiese was carrying £120 000 in his hand luggage and £554 920 in his checked baggage on a flight to Luxembourg. The City of Westminster Magistrates' Court approved a forfeiture order under the Proceeds of Crime Act, finding that the cash was associated with criminal conduct. Wiese said that he had earned the money in diamond deals in the 1980s and 1990s and had stored it in a safety deposit box at the Ritz Hotel in order to avoid South African exchange controls. Represented by Clare Montgomery, Wiese won an appeal in the London High Court in 2012 and reclaimed the money.

Meanwhile, the City Airport controversy reportedly spurred an investigation by the South African Revenue Service (SARS), resulting in 2012 in a finding that one of Wiese's companies, Titan, owed up to R2 billion in taxes in South Africa. The dispute went to the Supreme Court of Appeal in 2024.

== Personal life ==
Wiese's wife, Caro, is an art collector and the daughter of prominent politician Japie Basson. They have three children. Resident in Clifton, Cape Town, they also own the Lourensford Wine Estate in Somerset West, purchased in 1998, and a private wildlife reserve in the Kalahari desert.

== See also ==
- List of South Africans by net worth
