= Cargo (retail chain) =

British homewares retail chain

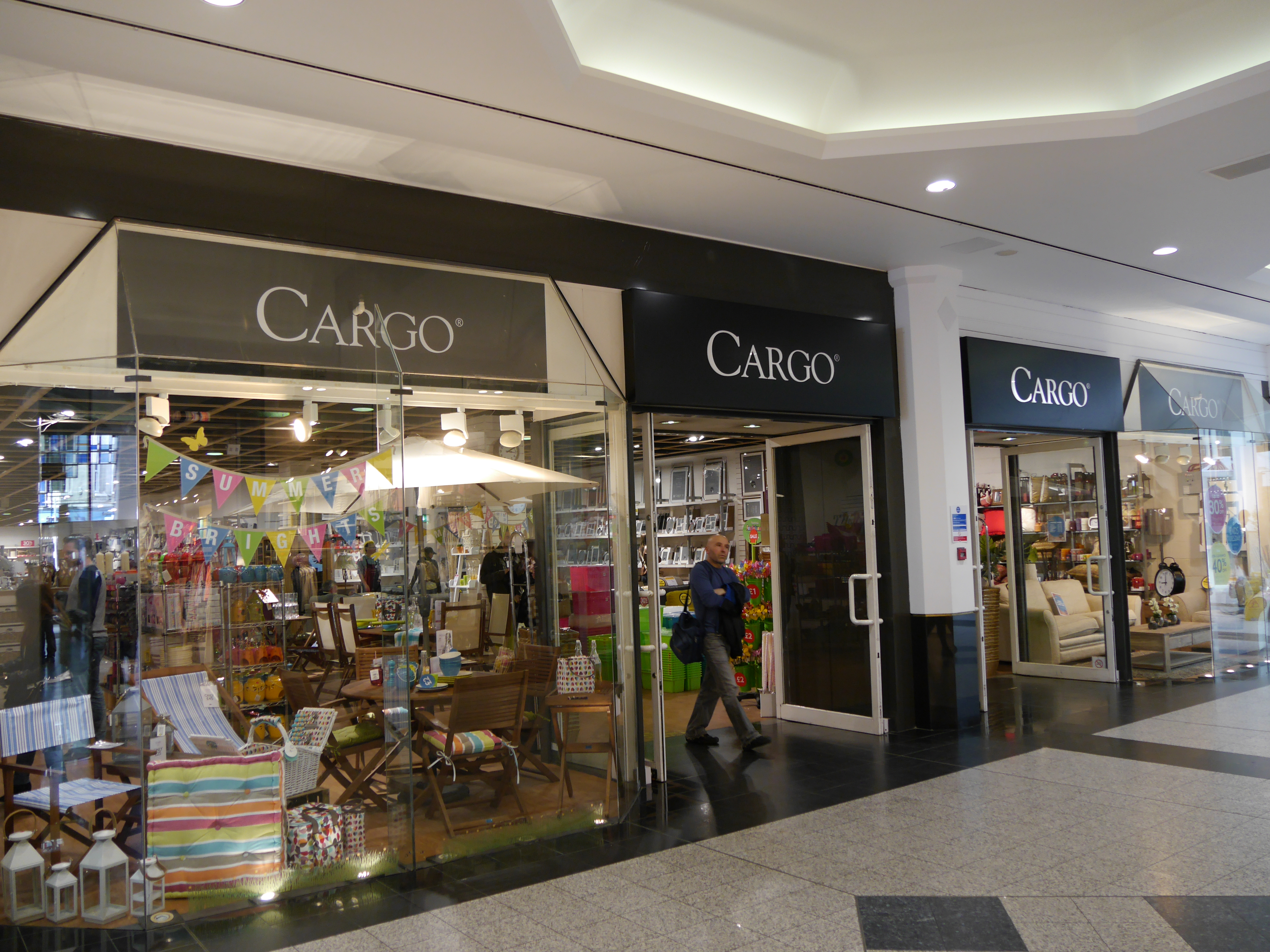
- Cargo store, Putney, London
- Industry: Homewares chain
- Founded: 1876
- Founder: James Waller Carpenter
- Defunct: 2015
- Successor: Bensons for Beds
- Owner: Steinhoff (trademarks)

Cargo was a British homewares retail chain, with 43 stores mostly situated in London and south-east England.

The company was established in London in 1876, by 20-year-old James Waller Carpenter, under the trading name of JW Carpenter Ltd. The group underwent several rebrands in the 1980s and 1990s, becoming Carpenter's In-House, Carpenter's and Carpenter's Cargo before becoming Cargo Homeshop in 1997. In May 2004, JW Carpenter was bought by Steinhoff, one of the world's largest furniture retailers, which owns UK high street brands Harveys Furniture and Bensons for Beds.

In 2015 Steinhoff announced the chain would be merged with Bensons for Beds and would continue as an online presence. The website was taken down shortly before the last few stores closed.
