= Steinhoff International =

South African-based international retail holding company

Steinhoff International Holdings N.V.
- Type: Public (Naamloze vennootschap)
- Industry: Retail
- Founded: 1964; 62 years ago (Westerstede, Lower Saxony, Germany)
- Founders: Bruno Steinhoff
- Defunct: 13 October 2023
- Fate: Restructured
- Successor: Ibex Topco B.V.
- Headquarters: Stellenbosch, Western Cape, South Africa
- Key people: Markus Jooste (former CEO)
- Revenue: ▲EUR 12.9 billion (2017–18 - 9 months)
- Number of employees: ▲130,000 (2018)
- Subsidiaries: Conforama; Mattress Firm; Pepco Group; Greenlit Brands
- Website: steinhoffinternational.com

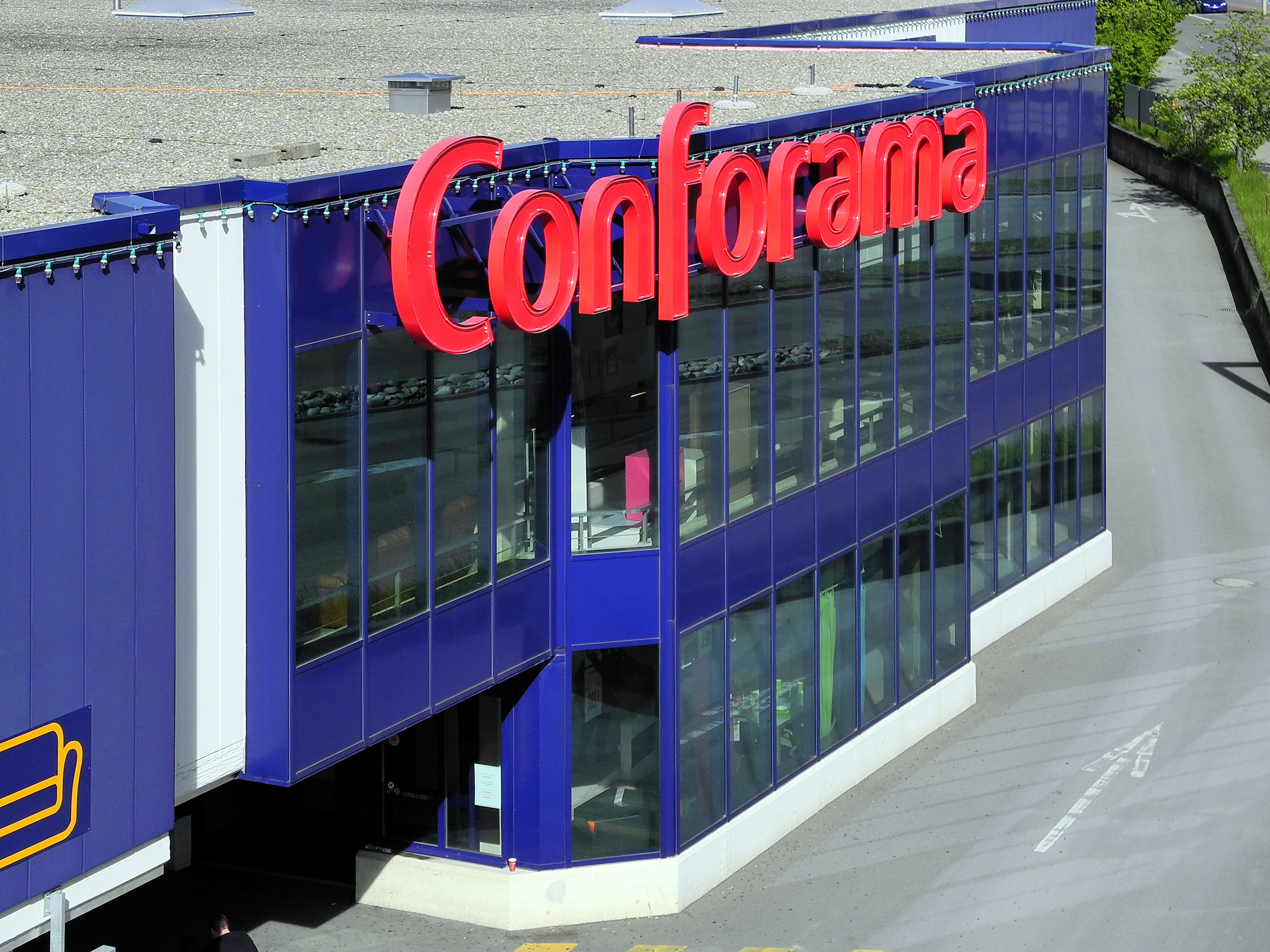
Conforama in Wallisellen, Switzerland.

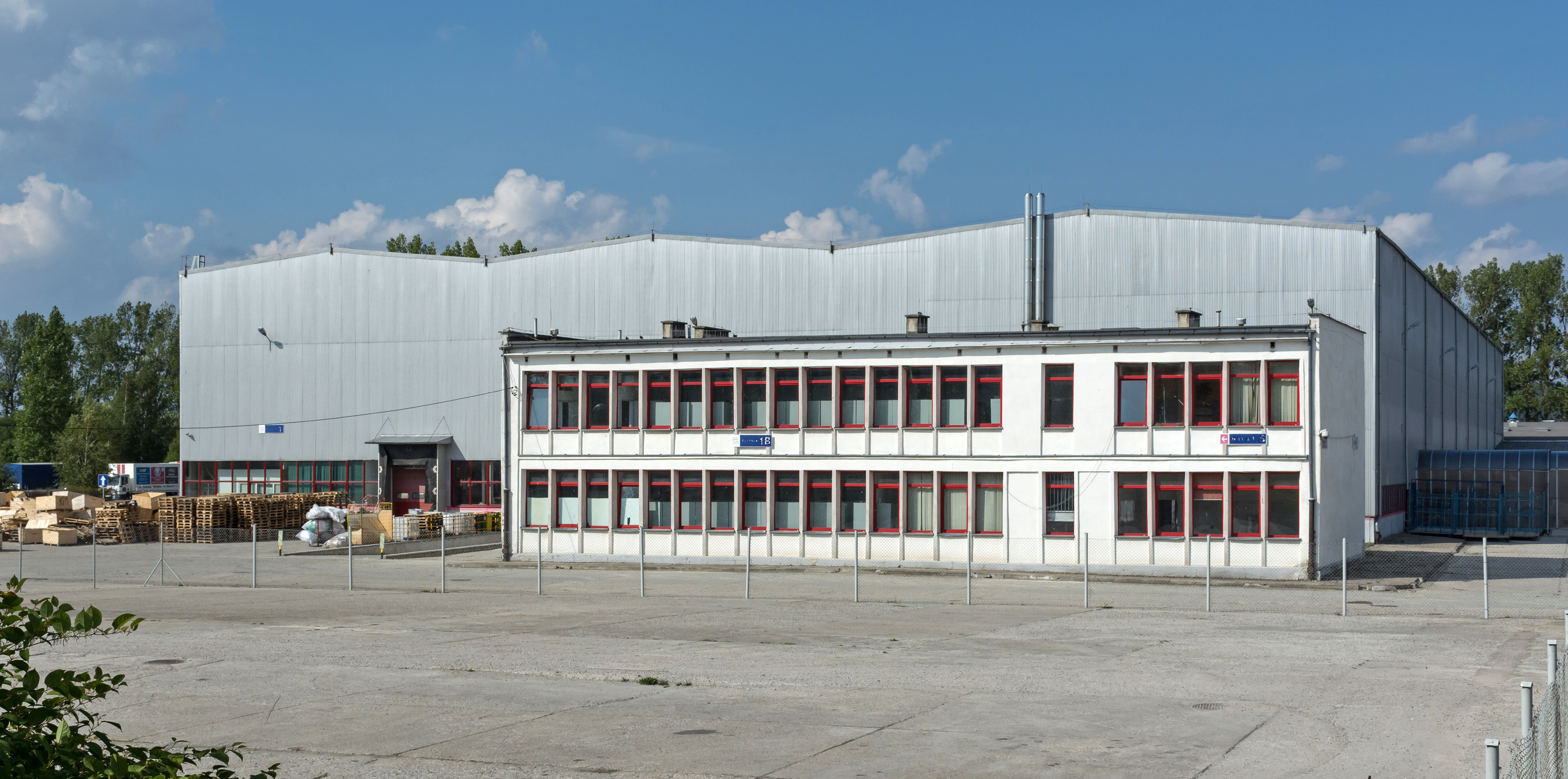
Steinhoff plant in Kłodzko, Poland.

Steinhoff International was a multinational holding company that was dual listed in Germany and South Africa. It was officially delisted in October 2023. Its holdings were in the retail sector, primarily in furniture and household goods, and included a 43,8% stake in South Africa's Pepkor group. The company operated in Europe, Africa, Asia, the United States, Australia, and New Zealand. It was well known for an accounting scandal which led to criminal charges against its former chief executive, Markus Jooste.

== History ==
Steinhoff was founded in 1964 by Bruno Steinhoff in Westerstede, Germany. Bruno Steinhoff sourced furniture from communist countries in Europe, for resale in Western Europe. In 1997, Steinhoff acquired 35 per cent of Gommagomma, a furniture company based in South Africa, and prepared for a merger the following year. The company moved its headquarters to South Africa in 1998, attracted by the low production costs there, and went public on the Johannesburg Stock Exchange that same year. The merged group was headed by Bruno Steinhoff as executive chairman and Markus Jooste as managing director.

=== Expansion ===
In subsequent years, Steinhoff acquisitions included an £86 million investment in the United Kingdom's Homestyle Group, in 2005; and, in 2011, a $1.2 billion investment in French Conforama, Europe's second largest retailer of home furnishings, with over 200 stores in France, Spain, Switzerland, Portugal, Luxembourg, Italy and Croatia; and, in 2013, the acquisition of Austrian home retailer Kika-Leiner. In 2015, Steinhoff acquired Pepkor, a South African investment and holding company focused on low-end retail; the $5.7 billion cash-and-share deal made Christo Wiese Steinhoff's largest shareholder and chairman.

In December 2015, Steinhoff International moved its primary listing from the Johannesburg Stock Exchange to the Frankfurt Stock Exchange, and founded a new Dutch holding company, Steinhoff International Holdings NV, based in Amsterdam. This move reflected Steinhoff's shift from its traditional markets, in the Indian Ocean basin, to the European market. The management remained in South Africa. As of May 2020, Steinhoff International Holdings NV remained headquartered in Amsterdam.

In March 2016, Steinhoff was a member of MDAX with capitalization of over €20 billion but had a low trading volume.

In July 2016, UK discount retail chain Poundland accepted Steinhoff's takeover offer of £597 million which was then increased by Steinhoff to £610 million in August 2016. The takeover received shareholder approval in September 2016.

As of August 2016, Steinhoff held retailing activities in 30 countries, counting 6,500 retail outlets belonging to 40 different brands, and employing about 90,000 employees. 60 per cent of the company's revenue, and two-thirds of its benefits, were made in Europe.

In August 2016, Steinhoff announced its plan to purchase the United States-based Mattress Firm for $3.8 billion. In February 2017, Steinhoff and South African retail giant Shoprite called off a proposed merger.

In 2017, Mattress Firm split from its supplier Tempur Sealy. In October 2018, Mattress Firm filed for bankruptcy but emerged from Chapter 11 bankruptcy 2 months later after financial restructuring with support from AlixPartners.

=== Debt problems ===
More significantly, in the aftermath of a major accounting scandal in 2017–2019, Steinhoff faced significant debts – $10 billion worth – and possible further liabilities due to civil claims against it, even as its creditors withdrew their credit facilities. Among the casualties was a consortium of lenders, including Japanese bank Nomura and a range of U.S. institutions, which had extended a $1.9 billion margin loan to Steinhoff. Nomura confirmed that it had booked an unrealised loss of 14 billion yen ($128 million). In 2018, Steinhoff negotiated with its creditors a three-year reprieve on debt repayment.

On 25 April 2018, Extreme Digital, a Hungarian e commerce firm acquired by Steinhoff in October 2015, was resold to their founders Balázs Várkonyi and Gyula Kelemen through their buying back shares.

As of August 2019, Steinhoff creditors had received a 50 per cent stake in Conforama.

In September 2019, the company told its shareholders that it would address its debts by selling off its non-retail assets and cutting jobs at Conforma. Du Preez said that, "We believe the only way for Steinhoff to survive is for it to become a pure investment holding company. The group cannot trade itself out of this debt." The company said that it intended to develop its markets in Eastern Europe (through Pepco) and Britain (Poundland) through its Pepkor Europe assets alongside its core interests in South Africa. During this period, Steinhoff sold its shares in Unitrans, a car dealer network; sold its shares in KAP Industrial and PSG Group (in South Africa) and in Showroomprivé (in Europe); and also sold property assets attached to its retail operations in Europe.

In November 2019, UK chains Bensons for Beds and Harveys and upholstery and bedding manufacturer Relyon were sold by Steinhoff to UK-based private equity group Alteri Investors.

On 8 July 2020, Steinhoff sold its remaining stake in Conforama France to Mobilux Sàrl which has been the furniture retailer BUT's parent company since 2016. Mobilux has 50-50 ownership by both Andreas Seifert's WM Holding, which is associated with XXXLutz through its owner Andreas Seifert, and the American investment firm Clayton, Dubilier & Rice (CD&R). In France, IKEA is the largest furniture retailer with a 15.43 per cent market share and Conforama and BUT have market shares of 10.86 per cent and 10.34 per cent which are second and third, respectively.

As of 2023, Steinhoff had 45 per cent ownership in MattressFirm, 79 per cent ownership in Europe's Pepco Group, 43 per cent ownership in South Africa's Pepkor Holdings, and full ownership of Greenlit Brands in Australia and New Zealand.

== Corruption scandal ==
=== Investigations into corruption scandal ===
In late November 2015, Steinhoff Europe Group Services offices in Westerstede were raided by German law authorities; in December 2015, German tax authorities began an investigation into suspected accounting fraud at Steinhoff. The company said that the investigation concerned the proper disclosure of revenues and taxable profits; by December 2017, the investigation included four current and former managers, who were suspected of having overstated revenues at Steinhoff subsidiaries.

On 5 December 2017, Jooste, Steinhoff's CEO, resigned in connection to the accounting irregularities. Deloitte, then Steinhoff's auditor, later said that it had uncovered the irregularities during the course of its 2017 audit and had "pushed" Steinhoff to investigate further; Jooste confirmed this. Steinhoff announced on the day of Jooste's resignation that its board had approached PricewaterhouseCoopers to perform an independent forensic investigation, but the investigation took over a year to complete. In the interim, Wiese (who at first had stepped in as acting CEO) resigned as chairman, and, the week after Jooste's resignation, the Standing Committee on Finance of the Parliament of the Republic of South Africa condemned Steinhoff and called for investigations of the company by regulators, including the Financial Services Board and the South African Reserve Bank. Steinhoff's value also plummeted. In the first day after Jooste's resignation, Steinhoff stocks lost 58 per cent in trading on the Frankfurt Stock Exchange and 56 per cent on the Johannesburg Stock Exchange; within two weeks, they lost almost 90 per cent. In 2018, Steinhoff announced a $12 billion writedown relating to the reversal of overstated revenues, profits, and asset values.

The complete PwC report was not made public, but, in March 2019, Steinhoff published a summary of the report, which said that:

A small group of Steinhoff Group former executives and other non-Steinhoff executives, led by a senior management executive, structured and implemented various transactions over a number of years which had the result of substantially inflating the profit and asset values of the Steinhoff Group over an extended period... Fictitious and/or irregular transactions were entered into with parties said to be, and made to appear to be, third party entities independent of the Steinhoff Group and its executives but which now appear to be closely related to and/or have strong indications of control by the same small group of people... it appears that the Steinhoff Group entered into a number of transactions (some of which were fictitious or irregular) with allegedly independent third party entities which resulted in the inflation of profits and asset values.

The report found that, between 2009 and 2017, the fictitious and irregular transactions had amounted to income of over €6.5 billion ($7.36 billion), and therefore had inflated the group's income by a concomitant amount. In March 2019, the company share price was still down 96 per cent from its value before the scandal erupted, representing a total loss of about $15 billion in market value.

After a stint in which chief operating officer Danie van der Merwe served as acting CEO, Louis du Preez was appointed to replace Jooste. In April 2018, Peter N. Wakkie, a Dutch attorney who is closely associated with Mikhail Fridman, was appointed the deputy chairman and was previously the acting chairman of supervisory. In September 2019, Steinhoff replaced Deloitte with Mazars as the firm's auditors.

=== Legal response ===
Steinhoff referred Jooste to South African authorities and launched a civil case against him, on the basis of what they viewed as his personal liability for the accounting scandal, although Jooste denied any knowledge of financial wrongdoing before December 2017. In March 2021, sources told Bloomberg that, in late 2020, German prosecutors in Oldenburg had indicted Jooste and three others on charges arising from the initial German investigation. In October 2022, the South African Reserve Bank seized Jooste's South African assets in connection to an investigation of the accounting irregularities, although, at that time, no criminal charges had yet been laid in a South African court.

In September 2024, South Africa's Financial Sector Conduct Authority (FSCA) is expanding its investigation into the Steinhoff scandal, focusing on potential violations by additional individuals related to financial statements from 2014 to 2016. The investigation covers three types of market abuse: insider trading, false statements, and price manipulation. The scandal, South Africa's largest corporate fraud, resulted in losses exceeding 250 billion rands for investors.

The scandal also gave rise to numerous civil claims against Steinhoff: by early 2021, it faced over 90 separate lawsuits – in South Africa, Germany, and the Netherlands – lodged by investors aggrieved by the drop in its share price after the December 2017 revelations. In early 2022, Steinhoff finalised plans to compensate retail investors for the share price drop through compensation from a combined payout "pot" of around R25 billion. Deloitte, as Steinhoff's auditor during the time the irregularities were taking place, agreed to contribute up to R1.3 billion (or €70 million) in compensation to claimants.

== Dispute with Andreas Seifert ==
Predating the accounting scandal was a longstanding legal dispute between Steinhoff and Austrian investor Andreas Seifert of XXXLutz. Jooste linked the dispute to the accounting scandal, saying that Seifert was the source of the initial allegations of false accounting. The November 2015 raids of Steinhoff's Westerstede offices had also involved the seizure of documents signed by Seifert, though Seifert said that the documents, and his signature on them, had been forged. Most centrally, however, the dispute concerned Steinhoff asset Poco, a discount furniture chain: Seifert claimed 50 per cent ownership of Poco, while Steinhoff claimed it had bought Seifert out. In February 2018, an Amsterdam court ruled that Steinhoff had to change its accounts to reflect Seifert's part-ownership, and, later that year, a German court – which had been hearing the case since 2015 – urged the parties to settle. In late April 2018, Steinhoff reached a settlement with Seifert which saw Seifert buy a 50 per cent stake in Poco for an amount calculated as a multiple of Poco's earnings, on the basis of an agreed equity valuation of €532.5 million for Poco in its entirety.

== Brands ==
Steinhoff's South African Pepkor brands included Ackermans, Buco, Dunns, Flash, HiFi Corp, Incredible Connection, John Craig, Pennypinchers, Pep, Refinery, Russels, Shoe City, Tekkie Town and Timbercity. Powersales was another African Steinhoff brand.

In the UK, Steinhoff owned the high street brands, Poundland (under Pepco Group) and Sleepmaster.

In Ireland, Steinhoff operated Dealz (under Pepco Group) and Pep&Co. Steinhoff's other European brands included Pepco (under Pepco Group) and Kika in Poland, Slovakia and Hungary.

Steinhoff expanded into the United States market on 7 August 2016 when it acquired Mattress Firm.
