= List of South Africans by net worth =

The following Forbes list of South African US dollar billionaires is based on an annual assessment of wealth and assets compiled and published by Forbes magazine.

== 2025 South African billionaires list ==
World Rank	Name	Citizenship	Net worth (USD)	Source of wealth
165	Johann Rupert and family	South Africa	14 billion	Richemont, Remgro
258	Nicky Oppenheimer and family	South Africa	10.4 billion	De Beers
1072	Koos Bekker	South Africa	3.4 billion	Naspers
1219	Patrice Motsepe	South Africa	3 billion	African Rainbow Minerals
1626	Michiel Le Roux	South Africa	2.2 billion	Capitec Bank
2233	Jannie Mouton and family	South Africa	1.5 billion	PSG, Capitec Bank
2233	Christoffel Wiese	South Africa	1.5 billion	Pepkor

== See also ==
- The World's Billionaires
- List of countries by the number of billionaires
