= Régis Schultz =

French businessman (born 1968)

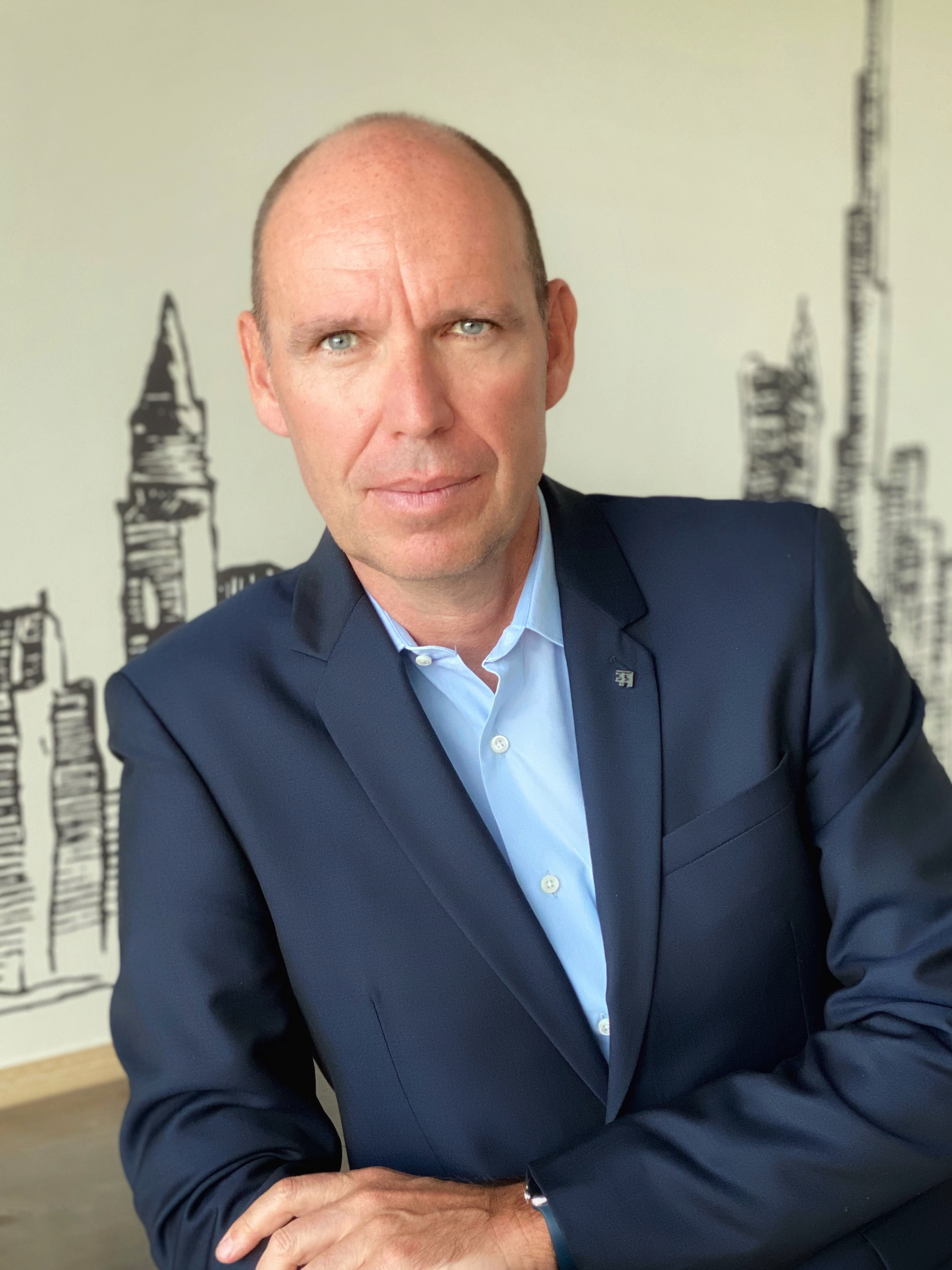
- Born: 10 December 1968 (age 57); France
- Education: Paris Dauphine University
- Occupation: Businessman
- Known for: CEO of JD Sports
- Children: 3

Régis Schultz (born 10 December 1968) is a French businessman, who is the CEO of JD Sports. During his career, Schultz has been president of retail at Al-Futtaim Group, CEO of French retail chain Monoprix and member of the executive committee of Groupe Casino, CEO of Darty, CEO of French retailer BUT and a senior executive at Kingfisher PLC.

== Early life ==
Schultz graduated from Paris Dauphine University in 1993.

== Career ==
=== Early career ===
Schultz started his career with the Pernod Ricard Group as Financial Controller at Orangina, becoming Chief Financial Officer of CSR Pampryl in 1997.

In 2000, he joined Kingfisher plc starting in Castorama France as Chief Financial Officer and then became the Deputy Chief Executive Officer.

In 2003, he moved to London to be the Strategy and Development Director of Kingfisher, member of the executive board, stepping up as Chief Financial Officer, Commercial Director and finally Chief Operating Officer for the subsidiary of Kingfisher, B&Q (Block & Quayle).

In 2008, Schultz became Chief Executive Officer (CEO) of the French furniture retailer BUT, after the leveraged buyout from Goldman Sachs and Colony Capital. After a successful turnaround at BUT, he joins Darty PLC as Chief Executive Officer and Chairman of Darty France in 2013.

Following the take over by Fnac in 2016, he became the chairman and CEO of Monoprix and member of the Casino Group executive committee.

In September 2022, he succeeded Peter Cowgill as CEO of JD Sports.

=== CEO of BUT ===
In October 2008, Schultz became CEO of BUT, a major French furniture retailer acquired by Colony Capital and Goldman Sachs. Driving organizational change, he digitalized BUT's stores and introduced new store formats, reviving its profitability and market share.

BUT sold 25 of its stores property for 200 million euros, thus unloading most of the company's debt. It opened BUT City and BUT Cosy stores - the retailer's new store formats, fully modernized its inventory and equipped all the employees with connected touch pads. Régis Schultz lead BUT to launching its first ecommerce website and implemented the performance and sales management system across the entire network of retail outlets.

Under Schultz's tenure, BUT's sales grew 7% yearly, hitting 1.8 billion euros in 2011.

=== CEO of Darty ===
In April 2013, Schultz became CEO of Darty - Europe's third-largest electrical goods retailer. He was in charge of managing the company's reorganization, applying the strategy code-named 'Nouvelle Confiance' which includes the "4D" plan: drive trading, digitalize Darty, develop the brand and deliver cost efficiency.

With Schultz as CEO, Darty's stores were digitalized and the new pricing strategy supported Darty in better competing against low-cost offering. Customer service was revolutionized with same-day delivery and the company launched the 'Darty button' - a home device that connects customers to Darty. Darty franchise program aimed to target least densely populated areas and the multi channel strategy development had a major impact on Darty's sales. An online marketplace similar to Amazon’s was launched to maintain the brand's leading position on the Web. The French online retailer Mistergooddeal was acquired, enabling Darty to set a foot in the low cost market.

Schultz has been called the architect of Darty's turnaround. Net results went from 38 million euros in 2013 to 93 million in 2016, and the share price moved from 40p when he joined Darty to 170p three years later. After Fnac acquired Darty in April 2016, Régis Schultz announced he would be moving away from the operations role and will remain leading the company as CEO.

=== President of Monoprix ===
In August 2016, Schultz became president of the French retail chain Monoprix and member of the executive committee of the Groupe Casino. During his mandate, Schultz launched and drove the digital transformation of the company, notably by acquiring a stake in the French e-shopping startup 'Epicery', taking over Sarenza with its ecommerce know-how, launching the partnership with Amazon Prime Now for express delivery and signing the agreement with Ocado - the online grocery retailer. Schultz's digital strategy included other initiatives such as the vocal shopping list with Google, online recipes with Jow and in-store mobile payments services.

It is also under his presidency that Monoprix accelerated its sustainable development, with initiatives such as the expansion of organic products offering, implementation of paper reduction program, eliminating printed catalogues and tackling plastic waste and pollution by launching the scheme that eliminated single-use plastic packaging.

=== President of Al-Futtaim Retail ===
In September 2019, Schultz was appointed chairman and CEO of Al-Futtaim Retail, a division of the Al-Futtaim Group. Operating in 16 countries across Middle East, North Africa and South East Asia, Al-Futtaim Retail runs more than 70 brands with over 700 stores.

=== CEO of JD Sports ===
Schultz joined the JD Sports as its CEO in 2022. In February 2023, he presented his five-year growth strategy. His plan includes opening up to 350 new stores a year as well as double-digit sales growth, double-digit market share in key regions and double-digit operating margin. One year into his five-year growth plan, JD Sports' profits dropped by 8%.

== Personal life ==
Schultz is married with two sons and a daughter.
