= Bensons for Beds =

Furniture retailer based in Northern England

- Type: Limited
- Industry: Retail
- Predecessor: Cargo
- Founded: 1950; 76 years ago
- Founder: Cyril Benson
- Headquarters: Accrington, Lancashire, England, United Kingdom
- Number of locations: 270 (February 2016)
- Products: Beds; mattresses; bedroom furniture
- Owner: Alteri Investors
- Website: www.bensonsforbeds.co.uk

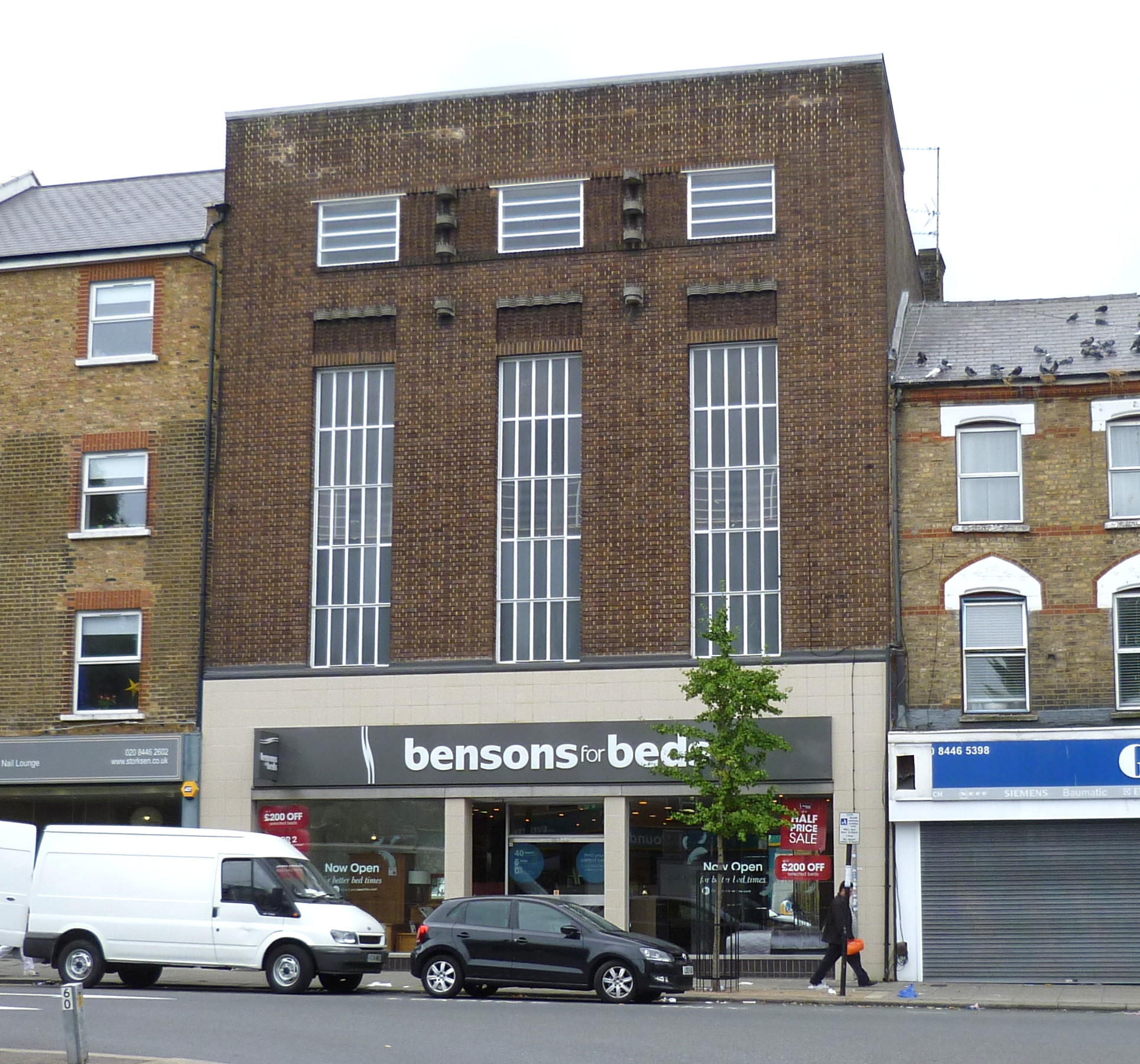
Bensons for Beds, north Finchley.

Bensons for Beds is a British bedroom furniture retailer. With 166 stores in the UK, it is Britain's largest bed retailer specialising in beds, mattresses and pillows.

== History ==
Founded as a general store in 1950 by Cyril Benson, Bensons for Beds opened the first dedicated bed centre in 1972. The company is now based in Accrington, Lancashire, and operates as a chain of concessions and stand-alone stores.

By February 2015, Bensons for Beds' had over 270 stores throughout England, Scotland, and Wales, following a merger with sister company Sleepmasters in England, Wales and Northern Ireland, and, in October 2011 with Bed Shed in Scotland.

In November 2019, Bensons for Beds was acquired from Steinhoff International by UK-based private equity group Alteri Investors, alongside Harveys and upholstery and bedding manufacturer Relyon.

On 30 June 2020, Bensons for Beds went into administration, but Alteri immediately bought it back, aiming to save between 150 and 175 of the chain's 242 stores, its Huntingdon manufacturing operation, and nearly 1,900 jobs.
