= Windhoek Gymnasium Private School =

High school in Windhoek, Namibia

Location
- 1 Sossusvlei Street; Windhoek, Khomas Region, Namibia
- Coordinates: 22.61675°S 17.10908°E

Information
- Type: Private school
- Motto: Logos-Pathos-Ethos (Teaching a new lifestyle, building a better future)
- Established: 2007
- Gender: Boys and Girls
- Website: www.curro.co.za/namibia/windhoek-gymnasium/

Windhoek Gymnasium Private School (Windhoek Gymnasium) is a private school in Windhoek, the capital of Namibia. The school has one campus in the Kleine Kuppe suburb, while the old campus situated in Olympia is now being used as an office complex for a private company. It is one of Namibia's top-performing schools, coming fifth in Grade 12 results in 2014 (2013: rank 8).

== History ==
Windhoek Gymnasium Private School was established on 17 January 2007. The school started off with 280 learners from grade 1 to 8. The school had grown to a total amount of 340 learners towards the end of 2007. The secondary school started in 2008 and grew by 700 learners. The learners grew to 1100 when a preprimary school was added in 2009 with 150 kids. By 2012 the school has grown to 1400.

The campus in Kleine Kuppe is divided into five blocks. The facilities provided at Block A are 14 secondary school classrooms , 2 computer labs, 2 laboratories, admin section and the Rector’s office. Block B accommodates 33 primary school classrooms; a design & technology room; 1 computer lab. Block C accommodates 15 secondary school class rooms and book stores. Block D accommodates the main reception and admin offices; school hall; cafeteria & coffee shop and cloakrooms. Block X accommodates 8 secondary school class rooms.

The school participates in cricket, rugby, hockey, tennis, netball, swimming, athletics and golf. Learners are encouraged to participate in the various sports provided by the school. The school appoints its own coaches and provides equipment and facilities.

== 2019 school bus incident ==
On 25 August 2019 while on a school trip to southern Namibia, a Windhoek Gymnasium bus overturned on the B1 national road south of Kalkrand. 2 learners were killed and several others injured. The driver of the hired bus, tested positive for alcohol.

== See also ==
- List of schools in Namibia
- Education in Namibia
