= Cimbebasia (Windhoek suburb) =

Suburb of Windhoek, Namibia

Coordinates: 22.632°S 17.081°E

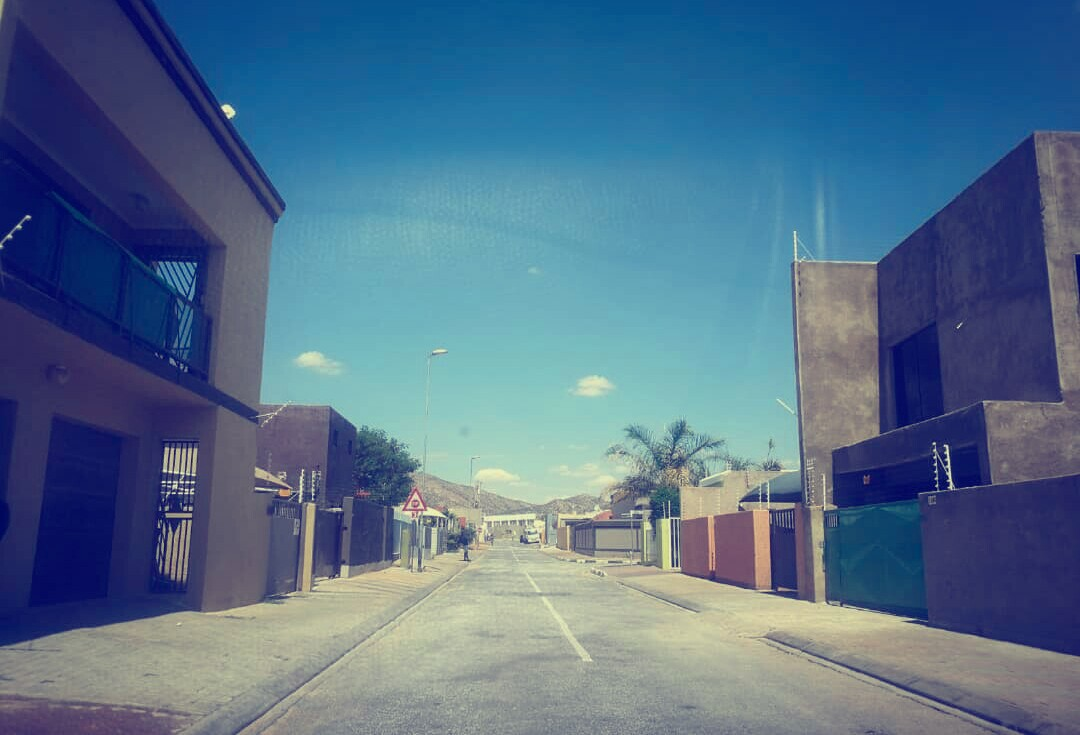
Houses in Cimbebacia

Cimbebasia is suburb situated in Southern Windhoek, the capital of Namibia. The name Cimbebasia was originally applied to the region occupied by a Roman Catholic Prefecture Apostolic that was established in southwestern Africa. Cimbebasia is bordered by Prosperita to the north and Kleine Kuppe to the east.

The suburb was established after independence to provide housing for the middle class. The suburb has had several extensions over the years. There are two schools in Cimbebasia: Amazing Kids Private School and Cimbebasia Primary School.
