= Conforama =

French international furniture store chain

- Conforama's current logo since 2012

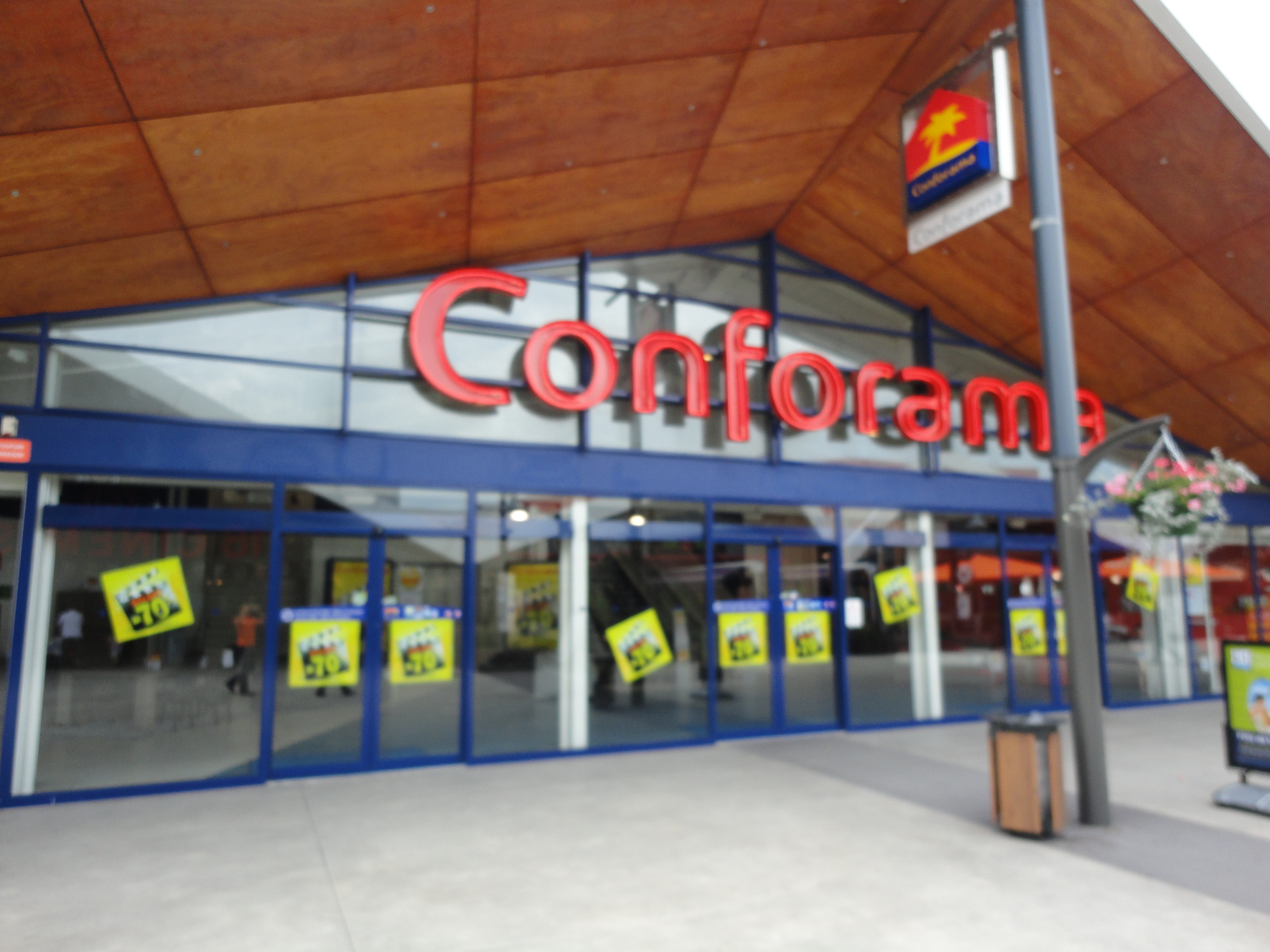
- A Conforama store in Torcy, France, in 2012
- Type: Public
- ISIN: NL0011375019
- Industry: Retail
- Founded: 12 December 1967; 58 years ago (in Saint-Priest, Rhône)
- Founder: Pierre and Guy Sordoillet; Jean Moll and Jacques Ragageot
- Headquarters: Lognes, Seine-et-Marne, France
- Area served: Worldwide
- Key people: Marc Ténart (Chairman); Christophe Guégan (COO)
- Products: Electronics; Home and furniture; Home improvement; Photo finishing; Craft supplies; Party supplies
- Revenue: ▲US$2.570 billion (2017)
- Owner: Ibex Topco B.V. French branches: BUT
- Number of employees: 13,500 worldwide (2018); 9,000 France (2018)
- Website: conforama.fr

Conforama is Europe's second-largest home furnishings retail chain with over 200 stores in France, Spain, Switzerland, Portugal, Luxembourg and Italy.

== History and ownership ==
In the early 1960s, Pierre and Guy Sordoillet, Jean Moll and Jacques Ragageot, supported by furniture dealers in the North and a Bordeaux manufacturer, Charles Minvielle, created a "Carrefour of furniture" by testing a discount formula in the outbuildings of an old farm in the suburbs of Lyon. In 1967, the first Conforama was opened in Saint-Priest, Rhône in a 2,500-square-metre industrial building.

In 1976, Conforama was acquired by Agache-Willot.

In 1981, the financial holding company experienced serious legal difficulties, and in 1991, Conforama was acquired by Pinault SA. Conforama set up its first commercial website in 1998.

In March 2011, Conforama was sold by PPR to Steinhoff International, for a consideration of €1.2 billion.

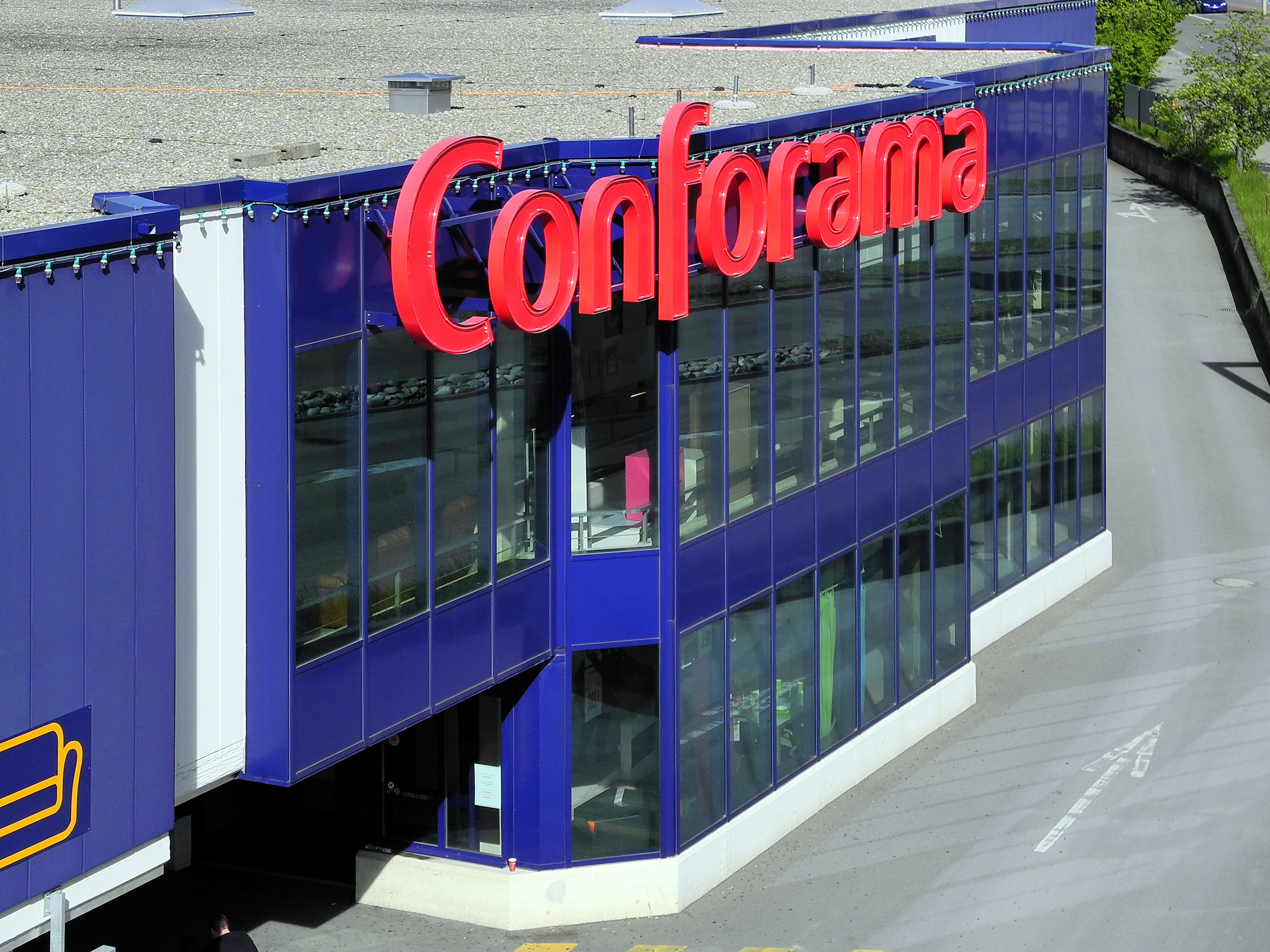
A Conforama store in Wallisellen, Switzerland in April 2012

In March 2016, Darty announced it had agreed to be purchased by Steinhoff for £673 million, through Conforama subsidiary. Fnac returned with a higher offer, resulting in a bidding war between Fnac and Conforama during April 2016. On 26 April, Conforama announced that it had dropped out in the battle for Darty. The Fnac offer was declared unconditional on 19 July 2016, thereby allowing the takeover to be completed. In September 2016, it was reported that Conforama and Casino had forged a supply purchase co-operation agreement.

In April 2017, Conforama signed title sponsorship with France's Ligue 1. The deal, reportedly worth €10 million a season, started in the 2017–18 season and ended on 2019–20. The next month, Conforama announced that it would take a 17% stake in the French number two in online clearance retail site Showroomprivé.fr in the amount of €157.4 million. On 11 January 2018, this stake was urgently sold off on the orders of Steinhoff, which was suffering from its own accounting scandal. The proceeds of this sale to Carrefour amounted to €79m, a loss of 50%.

Although the group had a net turnover of €3.4 billion in 2018, according to the parent company, they have accumulated losses of nearly €500 million ($564 million) since 2013. To that end, and to address the challenges in the retail sector, the company announced the departure of Frank Deshayes, general manager France, on 9 July 2019. A major restructuring plan for 2020 that was announced in July 2019, involved the closure of 32 stores – including the chain's flagship store in Pont Neuf – and the loss of 1,900 jobs.

In late September 2019, Conforama named Marc Ténart as the new general manager of the group. Marc Ténart had formerly headed Kingfisher, the holding company of Castorama.

In July 2020, Austrian furniture retailer XXXLutz Group acquired the 162 French branches of Conforama, through its French subsidiary BUT.
