= Incredible Connection =

South African consumer electronics retailer

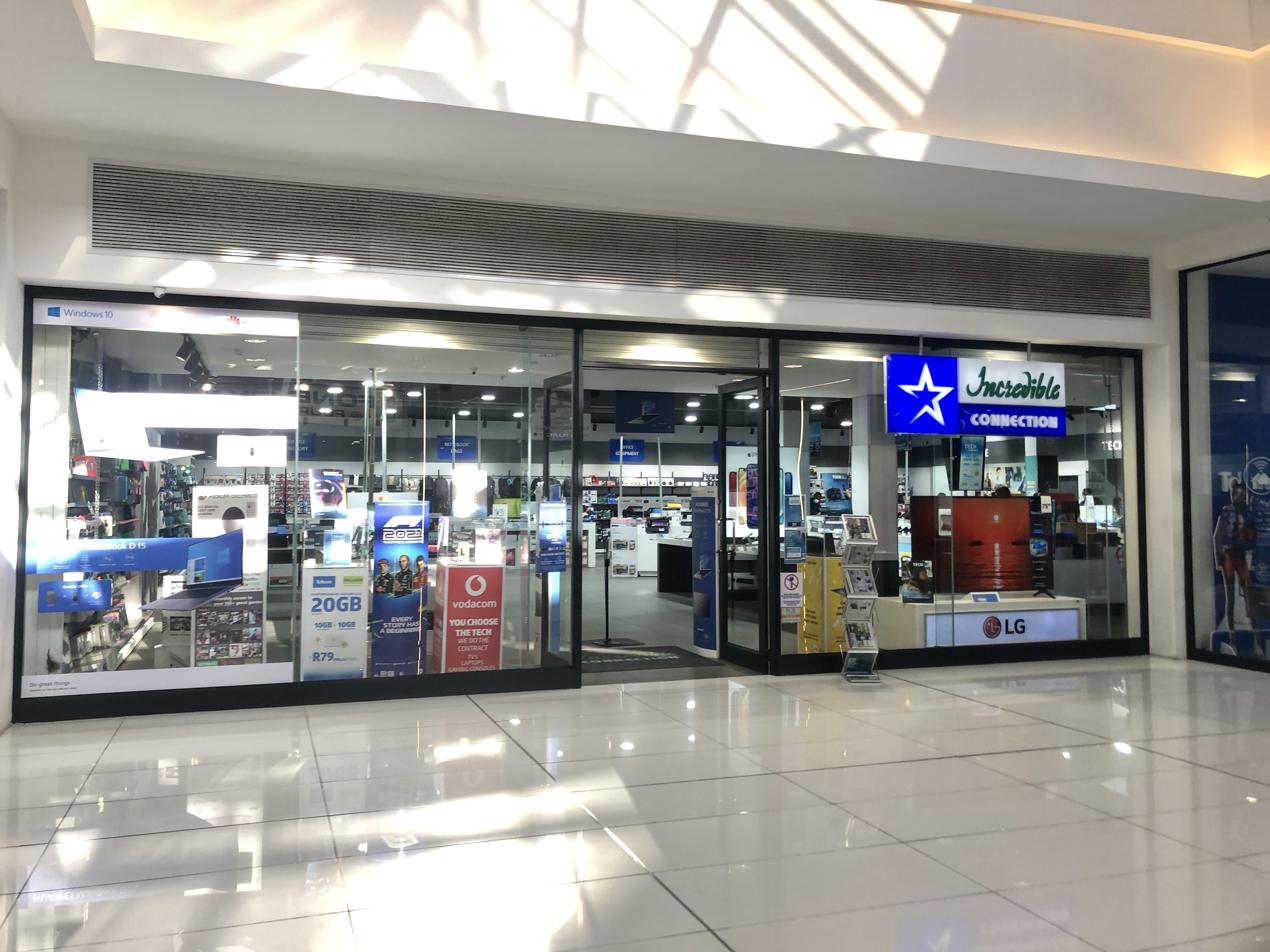
- Type: Subsidiary
- Industry: Retail
- Founded: 1995; 31 years ago
- Founder: Michael Glezerson and Michael David Smith
- Headquarters: Sandton, Gauteng, South Africa
- Number of locations: 75
- Area served: Africa
- Products: Consumer electronics
- Number of employees: 3,500
- Parent: Pepkor
- Website: incredible.co.za

Incredible Connection, also sometimes referred to simply as Incredible, is a South African consumer electronics retail chain. Founded in 1995 and headquartered in Sandton, Gauteng, Incredible Connection is a subsidiary of major South African retail holding company Pepkor.

== History ==
In 1989, Australian entrepreneurs Michael Glezerson and Michael David Smith founded Software Connection, with the company's original store located in Sandton, Johannesburg.

In 1995, the first Incredible Connection opened in the suburb of Woodmead, Johannesburg.

On 15 December 1998, Incredible Connection was acquired by Connection Group Holdings Limited, itself a subsidiary of JD Group Limited.

In 2005, the company was operating a total of 34 stores. This had increased to 78 by 2018.
