= Westerstede =

- Town
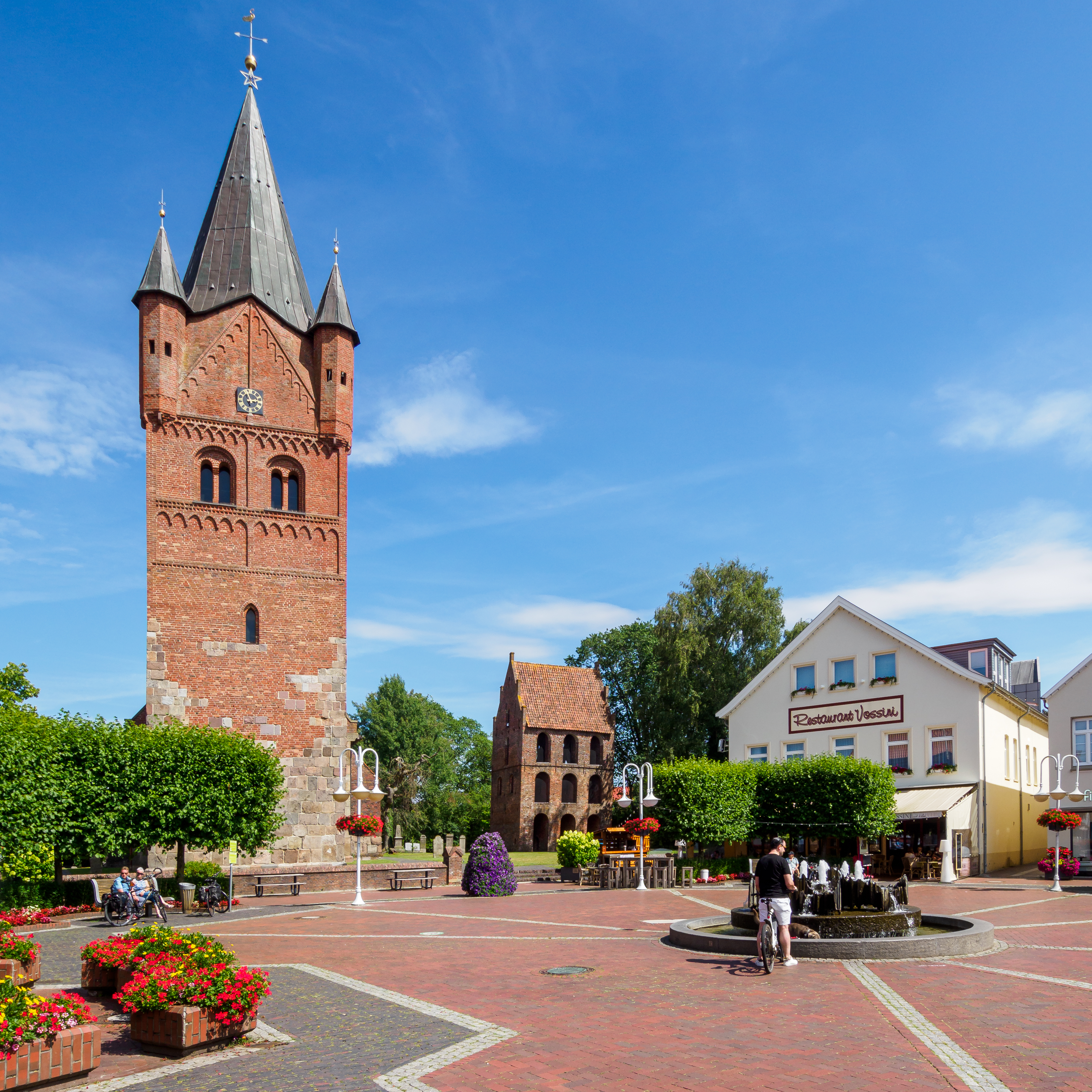
- St Peter's Church and market square

- Flag Coat of arms

- Location of Westerstede within Ammerland district
- Interactive map of Westerstede
- Location within Germany Location within Lower Saxony
- Coordinates: 53°15′N 7°55′E
- Country: Germany
- State: Lower Saxony
- District: Ammerland
- Subdivisions: 24 districts

Government
  - Mayor (2019–24): Michael Rösner

Area
  - Total: 179.55 km^{2} (69.32 sq mi)
- Elevation: 6 m (20 ft)

Population (2025-12-31)
  - Total: 23,956
  - Density: 133.42/km^{2} (345.56/sq mi)
- Time zone: UTC+01:00 (CET)
  - Summer (DST): UTC+02:00 (CEST)
- Postal codes: 26655
- Dialling codes: 04488, 04409
- Vehicle registration: WST
- Website: www.westerstede.de

Westerstede (German pronunciation: [vɛstɐˈʃteːdə]; Low German: Westerstäe) is the capital of the Ammerland district, in Lower Saxony, Germany. It is situated approximately 25 km northwest of Oldenburg.

It is known for hosting the Rhodo Festival, the biggest exhibition of rhododendrons in Europe. The festival is hosted every four years (next time in 2027).

The villages of Burgforde, Eggeloge, Felde, Fikensolt, Garnholt, Gießelhorst, Halsbek, Halstrup, Hollriede, Hollwege, Hollwegerfeld, Hüllstede, Ihausen, Ihorst, Karlshof, Linswege, Linswegerfeld, Mansie, Lindern, Moorburg, Neuengland, Ocholt, Ocholterfeld, Ollenharde, Petersfeld, Tarbarg, Torsholt, Westerloy, Westerloyerfeld and Westerstederfeld are part of Westerstede.

The railway station of Westerstede is located in the village of Ocholt, 6 km south of the town. Trains from and to Leer and Oldenburg halt there every hour.

The community (and the whole Ammerland region) is famous for its tree nurseries. They grow rhododendrons that are sold outside Germany as well. The slightly acid peat soil is very suitable for this type of horticulture.

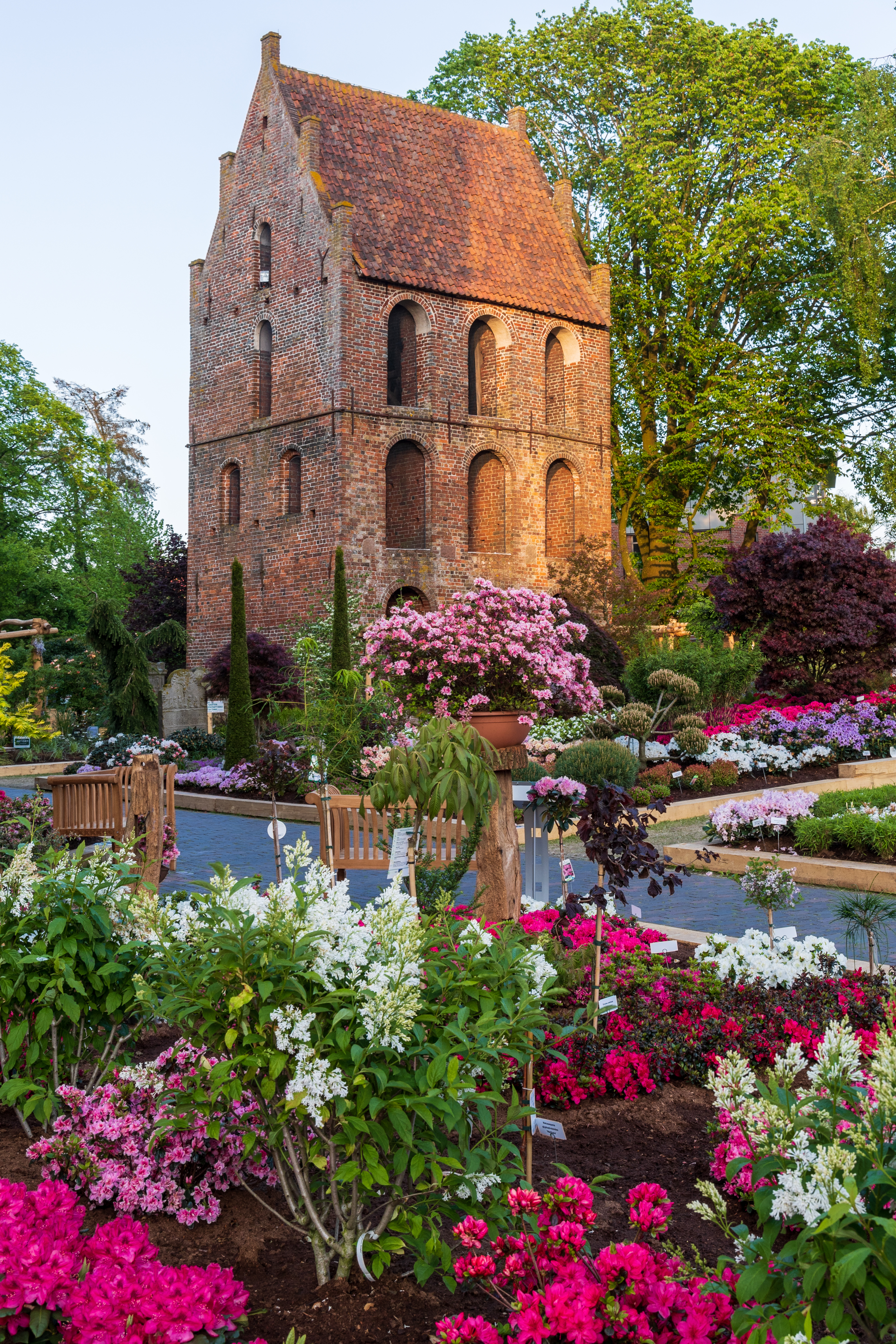
Belltower at Rhodo 2023, exhibition of rhododendrons

Near Linswege village, 7 km north-east of Westerstede, a Rhododendron Park has been established next to a beautiful wooded area. The park is open to visitors in May and June every year.

== Mayor ==
The current mayor of Westerstede is Michael Rösner (UWG), who has been in office since 2019.

== Notable people ==
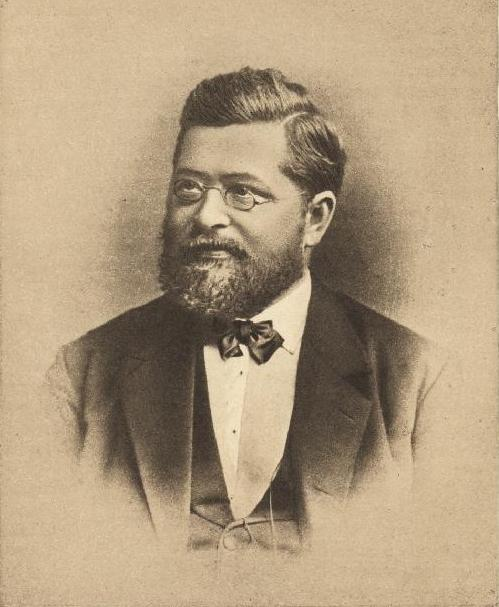
Friedrich Tietjen

- Wolfgang Hackbusch (born 1948), mathematician
- Eilhardus Lubinus (1565–1621), professor of poetics, theology, mathematics, geography, and Rector of the University of Rostock
- Bruno Steinhoff (born 1937), billionaire businessman, founder of Steinhoff International
- Friedrich Tietjen (1834–1895), astronomer
