= Harveys Furniture =

Former British furniture retailer

Harveys Furniture Ltd
- Harveys Logo
- Company type: limited company
- Industry: Retail
- Founded: 1966; 60 years ago
- Defunct: 30 June 2020; 5 years ago
- Headquarters: United Kingdom
- Key people: Simon Barnett (Director)
- Products: Furniture
- Parent: Alteri Investors
- Website: www.harveysfurnitureltd.co.uk

Harveys Furniture Ltd was a British retail chain, specialising in living room and dining room furniture, and was one of the largest furniture specialists in the United Kingdom, with over 150 stores alongside Oak Furnitureland.

== History ==
Harveys Furniture was established in the United Kingdom in 1966, with its first store opening in Mare Street, East London. It began as a private company, selling textiles and home furnishings. In 2003, Harveys made the decision to move to a furniture only business, removing all textiles from their product portfolio. The company was acquired by Steinhoff International in October 2005.

Between 2004 and 2010, Harveys Furniture specialised in living room, dining room and bedroom furniture. However, in May 2010 the bedroom furniture range was removed from the catalogue and was taken over by Bensons for Beds, another brand by Steinhoff. A fire engulfed the branch in Carlisle on 23 November 2013, following an arson attack. It reopened in March 2016.

Harveys had its first celebrity partnership in September 2018, with Louise Redknapp, launching her own collection of sofas. In November 2019, Harveys and Bensons for Beds were acquired by private equity owner, Alteri Investors. On 30 June 2020 Harveys announced the company had officially gone into administration, with the immediate loss of 240 jobs.
