= Pep (South Africa) =

South African retail company

PEP
- Industry: Retail
- Founded: 1965
- Headquarters: Parow, Cape Town, South Africa
- Number of locations: 1,800 stores
- Area served: Southern Africa
- Key people: Jaap Hamman(MD); Louis Brand (CD & FD)
- Products: Clothing
- Number of employees: 15,000
- Parent: Pepkor
- Website: www.pepstores.com

Pep (stylized as PEP) is a multinational budget retail company based in Cape Town, South Africa. Founded in 1965, PEP operates around 1,800 stores across 11 countries in Southern Africa, and employs around 14,000 people.

A subsidiary of Pepkor, the company also owns and operates the largest clothing factory in Southern Africa, where it manufactures much of its product line.

== History ==
In 1955, after putting himself through university, the son of South African farmer, Renier van Rooyen, started running a bargain shop part-time in Upington with no previous retail experience in partnership with Gawie Esterhuyzen while they ran other businesses. Eventually becoming more experienced and involved full-time van Rooyen began restructuring and expanding the bargain store, buying out his partner Esterhuyzen in 1956.

Van Rooyen opened an additional store in 1959 to focus on selling just discounted clothing. He amalgamated the two discount stores and added a small warehouse under a holding company called BG Bazaars by 1960 and started expanding outside of Upington.

BG Bazaars built quick success by offering quality clothing, blankets, and shoes at very low prices, maintaining low overheads, and focusing on underserved markets similar to the modern retail giant Wal-Mart.

By 1965, Van Rooyen launched the PEP Stores Ltd (known locally as just "PEP"), with just R50,000 in starting capital, in De Aar, followed by branches in Kimberley and Postmasburg integrating all the BG Bazaars branches under the PEP banner. In just two years they opened a further 29 branches with an average turnover of R79,000 each.

Things took a big shift in 1971 when van Rooyen approached Whitey Basson to become the financial director of the new retail chain that van Rooyen had founded. Van Rooyen was planning to list the company on the JSE as Pepkor. Basson agreed to join the company as financial director and in 1974 became head of operations.

By 1981, PEP expanded to 500 stores, 10 factories, 12,000 employees with a turnover of close to R300 million. At this time Christo Wiese also bought out van Rooyen's holdings in Pepkor, becoming the major shareholder and chairperson of Pepkor.

In 2014 Wiese sold Pepkor to Steinhoff International in exchange for about 20% of Steinhoff's issued shares.

== See also ==
- Retailing in South Africa
