= Bruno Steinhoff =

Rudra Prime

- Born: November 1937 (age 88)
- Occupation: Businessman
- Known for: Founder of Steinhoff International
- Children: 2

Bruno Ewald Steinhoff (born November 1937) is a German billionaire businessman, the founder of Steinhoff International, a South African-based international retail holding company, and its executive chairman until September 2008. He is now a non-executive director and a member of the supervisory board.

== Early life ==
Bruno Steinhoff was born in November 1937.

== Career ==
Steinhoff started his career in furniture in 1964 in Westerstede, Germany. He started by sourcing furniture from Eastern Europe and selling it in Western Europe, and began manufacturing in 1989.

Steinhoff International is Europe's second largest furniture retailer, after Ikea.

== Personal life ==
Steinhoff lives in Johannesburg, South Africa.

His daughter Angela Krüger-Steinhoff is a member of the supervisory board of Steinhoff International.
