= Grove Mall =

Shopping center in Namibia

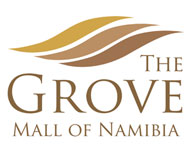
- Location: Kleine Kuppe, Windhoek, Namibia
- Coordinates: 22.6203855°S 17.0912727°E
- Address: Chasie Street, Hilltop mixed-use estate, Kleine Kuppe
- Opened: October 2014
- Num. of stores: 120
- Floor area: 52,089 square metres (560,680 sq ft)
- Floors: 2
- Website: thegrovemallofnamibia.com

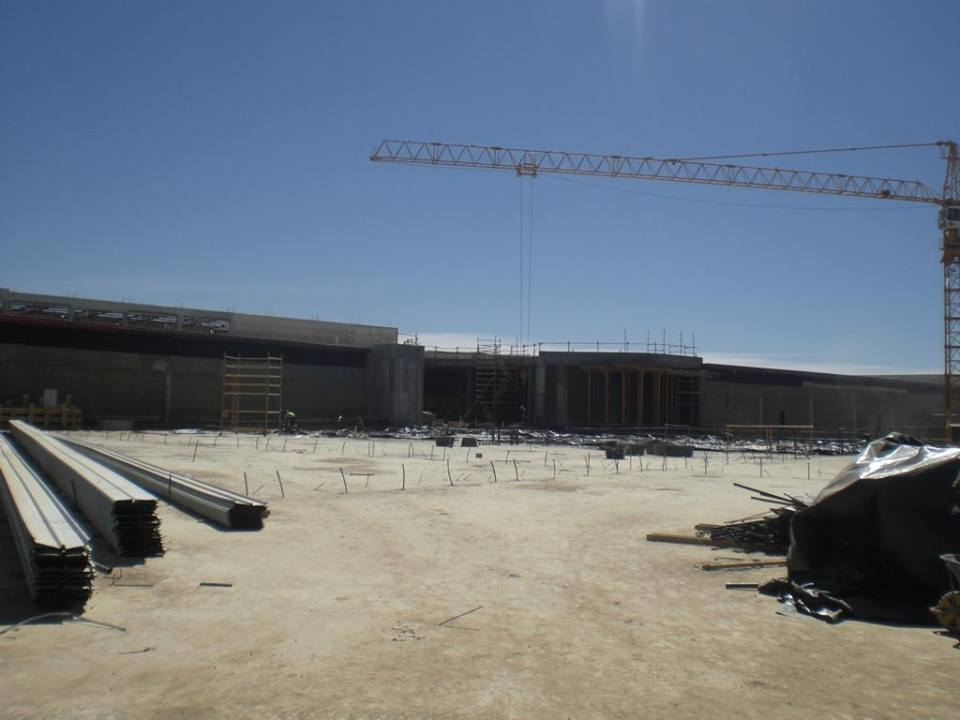
The Grove Mall under construction in 2014

Grove Mall (originally The Grove Mall of Namibia) is the largest shopping centre in Namibia, Southern Africa, billed as the country's first regional shopping mall. It is located in the Hilltop mixed-use estate in Kleine Kuppe, in the southern Windhoek suburbs. It has 52,089 square metres (560,680 sq ft) of gross leasable area, anchored by Checkers (supermarket), Game (hypermarket), Edgars (department store), Woolworths' 9th store in the country, Ster Kinekor cinemas, and SPAR (supermarket). Other well-known South African and international chains present include Truworths, Ackermans, Zara, Cotton On, Dis-Chem pharmacy, and Sportsmans Warehouse. It had 120 stores and restaurants in all upon opening in October 2014, of which 28 were new to Namibia. It cost 1 billion Namibian dollars to build.
