= Kleine Kuppe =

- Location within Namibia
- Coordinates: 22°37′16″S 17°6′3″E
- Country: Namibia
- Time zone: UTC+2 (South African Standard Time)

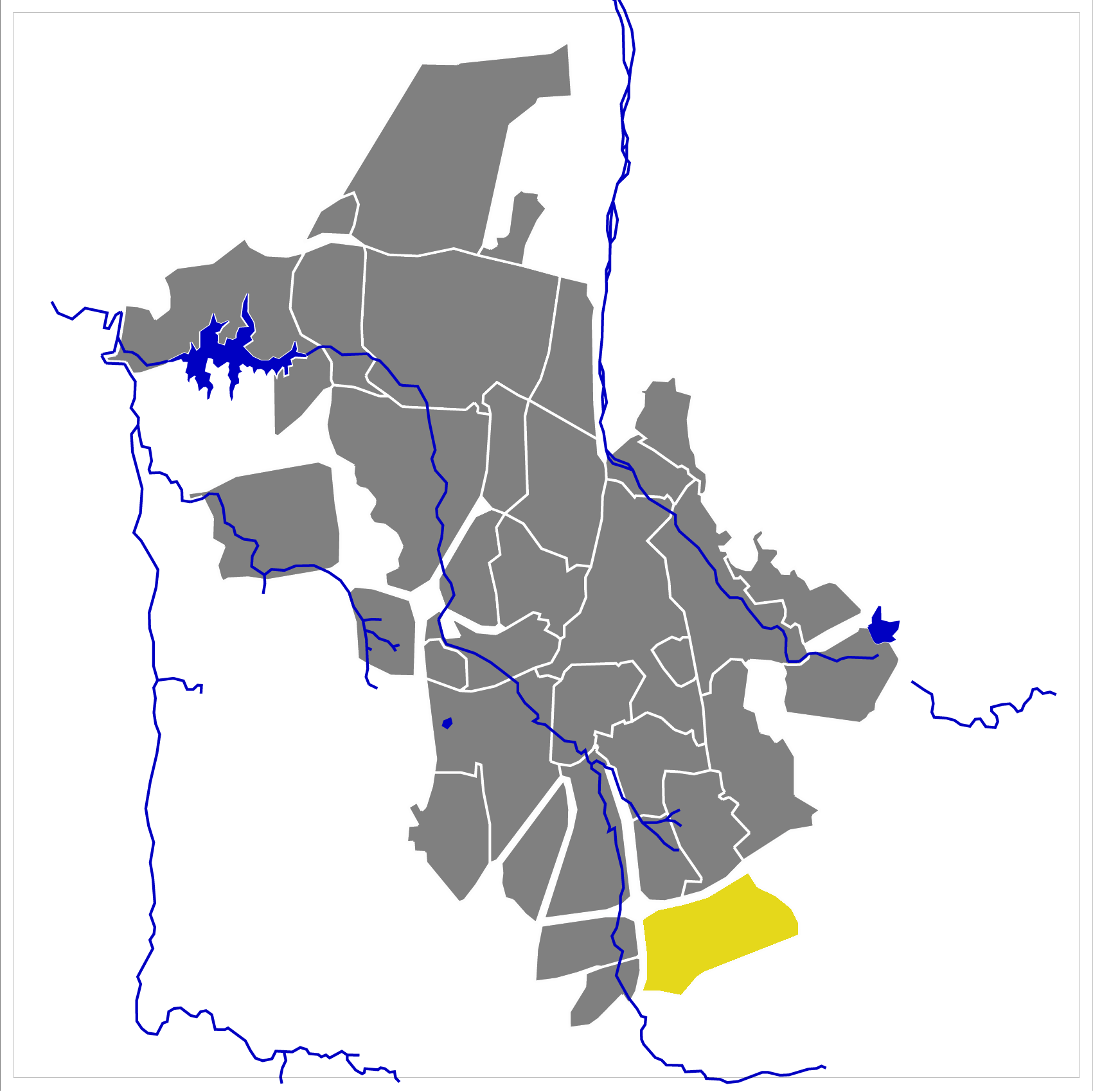
Kleine Kuppe

Kleine Kuppe (lit. 'Small Hilltop' in German) is a residential suburb in the south of Windhoek, the capital of Namibia. Kleine Kuppe is a middle income suburb that is bordered by the suburbs of Olympia to the north and Cimbebasia to the west. The Windhoek Gymnasium Private School has one of its campuses in Kleine Kuppe. Grove Mall, the largest shopping centre in Namibia is located in the Hilltop mixed-use estate in the area, as are several other retail centres.

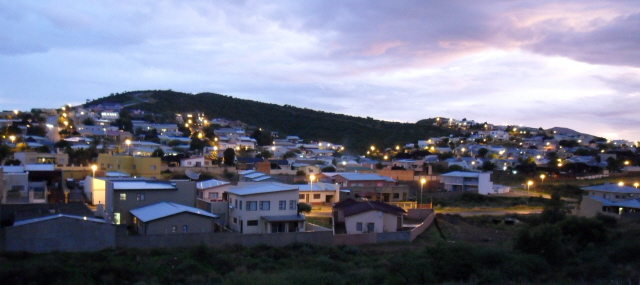
Kleine Kuppe Extension 1

== Natural & Recreational Attractions ==
There is a 1 km walking trail in Kleine Kuppe, starting off Okandeka Street, as well as the Haven Zoological Park which is a small petting zoo.
