= BUT (retailer) =

French retail store brand

- Type: Société par Actions Simplifiée
- Industry: Retail
- Founded: 1972
- Founder: Andre Venturini
- Headquarters: Émerainville, Seine-et-Marne, France
- Products: furniture, home decoration, major appliances, small appliances, consumer electronics
- Revenue: € 1.8 billion (2010)
- Number of employees: 6500 employees in stores and 300 at headquarters
- Website: but.fr

BUT is a French brand of retail stores specialized in home goods, including furniture, large and small appliances, and consumer electronics.

== History ==
The BUT brand was created in 1972 by André Venturini in Le Havre, France. With his son Michel, he rapidly expanded his network by using franchising. In 1982, there were 140 BUT stores, and in 2015, 280.

In 1987, Carrefour became a major shareholder of BUT; it sold its shares in 1993. In 1997, BUT was bought by the English company Kingfisher, owners of B&Q and Comet, which made it part of Kingfisher Electricals.

Since 31 March 2008, BUT has been owned to Decomeubles Partners, a company held by a consortium of Colony Capital, Goldman Sachs, and OpCapita.

In November 2016, a 50/50 partnership between Austrian furniture retailer XXXLutz Group and Clayton, Dubilier & Rice acquired BUT.

In July 2020, BUT acquired the French branches of Conforama.
