= Wernhil Shopping Centre =

Shopping mall in Windhoek, Namibia

Coordinates: 22.5836°S 17.0936°E

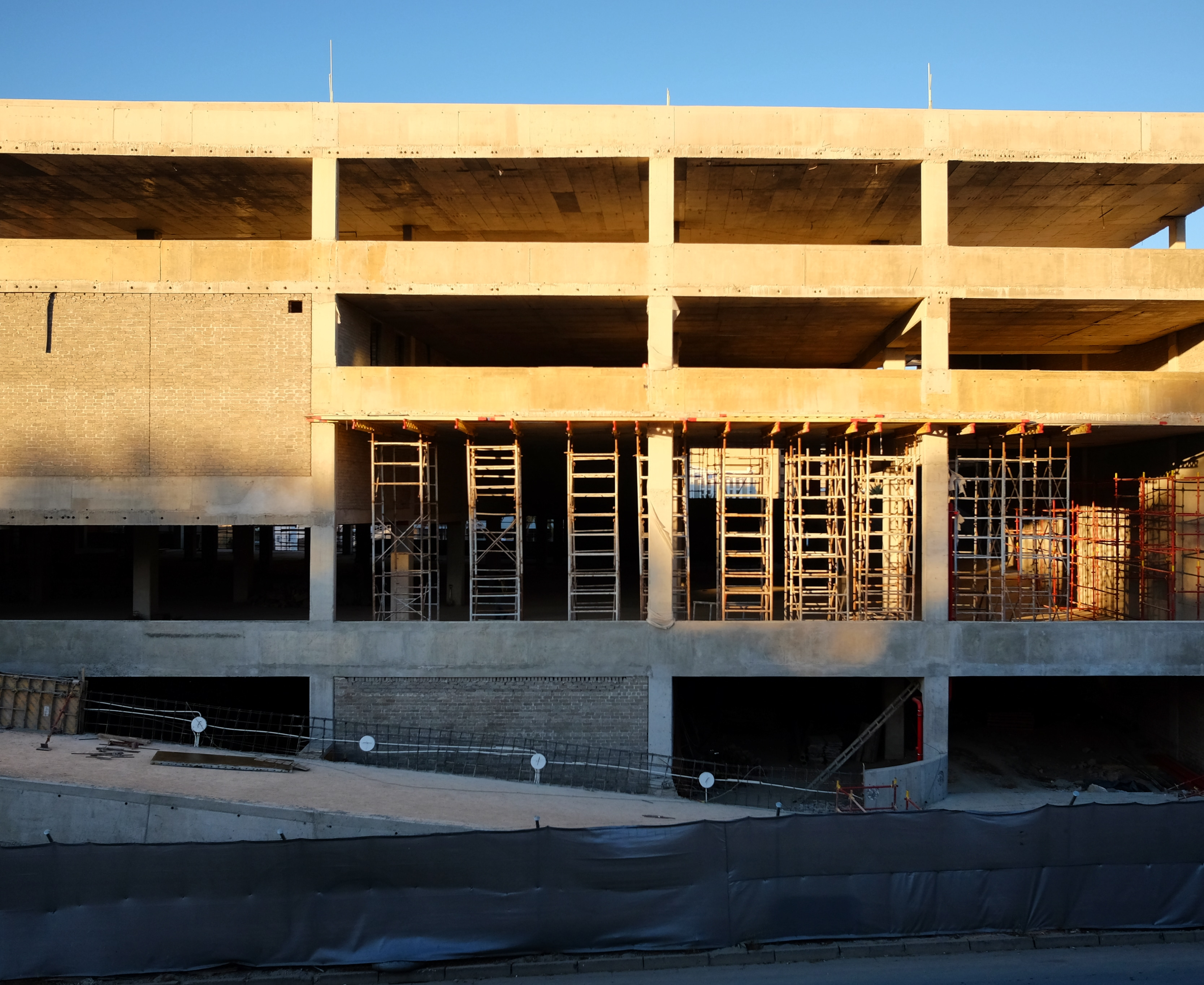
Wernhil Shopping Centre

The Wernhil Shopping Centre formerly known as Wernhil Park Mall is a mall in Windhoek's central business district. It is named after the first names of Werner and Hildegard List, the then-senior stockholders of the Ohlthaver & List group of companies who owns the facility. It is the second largest mall in Namibia. In 2011, Wernhil reopened after a N$ 600 million expansion.
