= Nilkamal Plastics =

Indian plastic company

Nilkamal Ltd.
- Type: Public Limited Company
- Traded as: BSE: 523385; NSE: NILKAMAL
- Industry: Furniture
- Genre: Furniture
- Founded: 1981
- Founders: Mr. Vamanrai Parekh, Mr. Sharad Parekh
- Headquarters: Mumbai, Maharashtra, India
- Revenue: ₹21.9 billion (US$230 million)
- Website: https://nilkamal.com/

Nilkamal Limited is a plastic products manufacturer based in Mumbai, India. It is the world's largest manufacturer of moulded furniture and Asia's largest processor of plastic moulded products. Their product range consists mainly of custom plastic mouldings, plastic furniture, crates and containers. The company also has a chain of retail stores under the @home brand.

== History ==
Nilkamal was incorporated on 5 December 1985 as Creamer Plastic. The company changed its name to Nilkamal Plastic on 23 August 1990. In Year 2004 Company Changed Names to Nilkamal Ltd. The company has manufacturing facilities in Samba, Greater Noida, Pondicherry, Barjora, Sinnar, Nashik and Silvassa. The company also has joint manufacturing ventures in Bangladesh (Nilkamal Padma Plastics) and Sri Lanka (Nilkamal Eswaran Plastics). In 2011, the company also began production of mattresses with manufacturing units in Hosur and Dankuni.

== @home ==
At-home Store
- Headquarters: Mumbai, India
- Parent organization: Nilkamal Limited
- Website: www.at-home.co.in

@home is a chain of retail stores owned by Nilkamal Limited.

@home has 20 stores in 14 cities in India.

== Sponsorship ==
In September 2017 it was announced that Nilkamal had agreed to become the co-sponsor of Mohun Bagan A.C for the period between July 2018.The sponsorship deal with Nilkamal Limited happened for a sum of ₹ 20 million (₹ 2 Crore) and will continue until the end of the season.

== Media gallery ==
=== Arts and craft at Nilkamal Homes, Bangalore ===

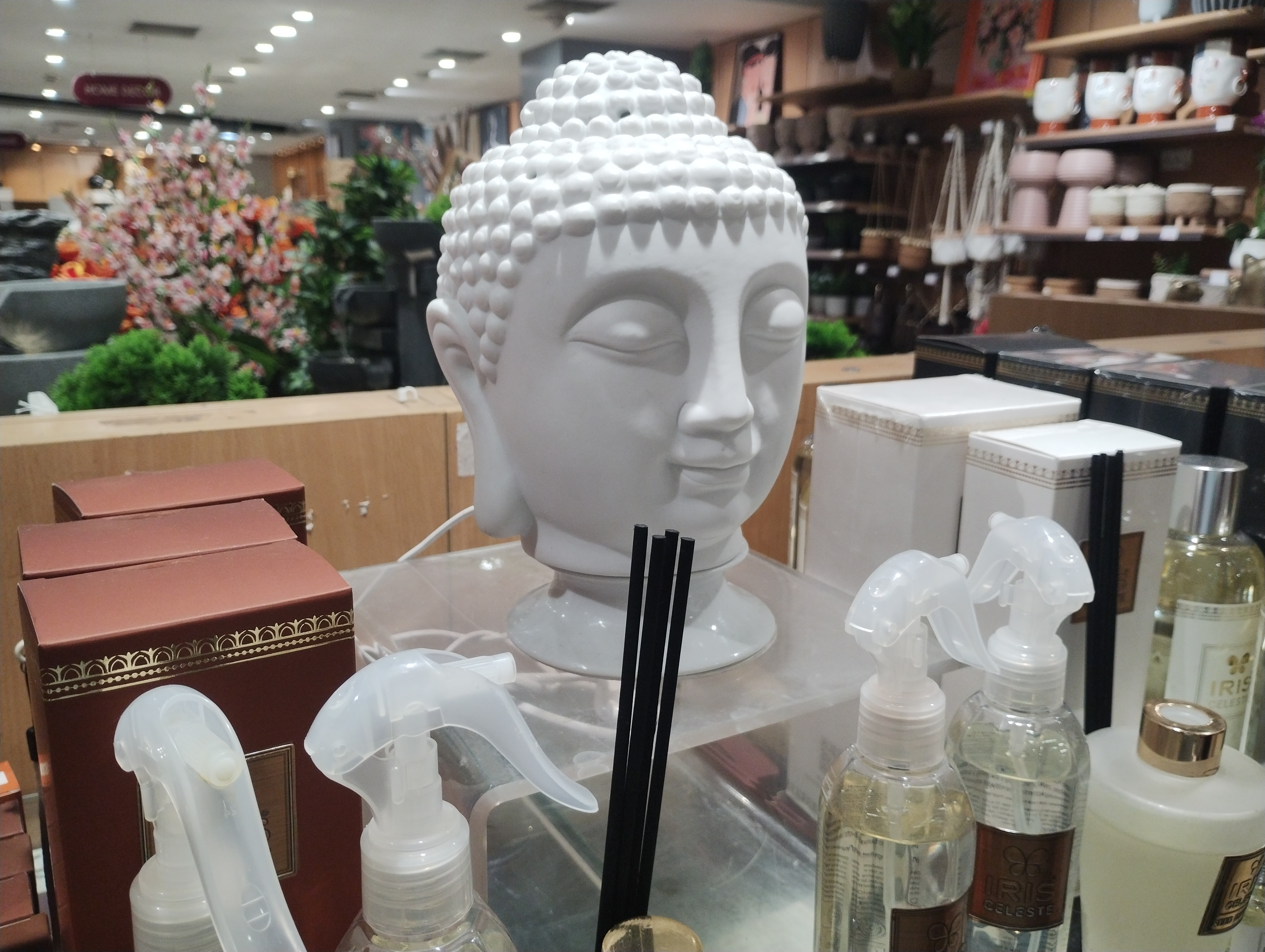

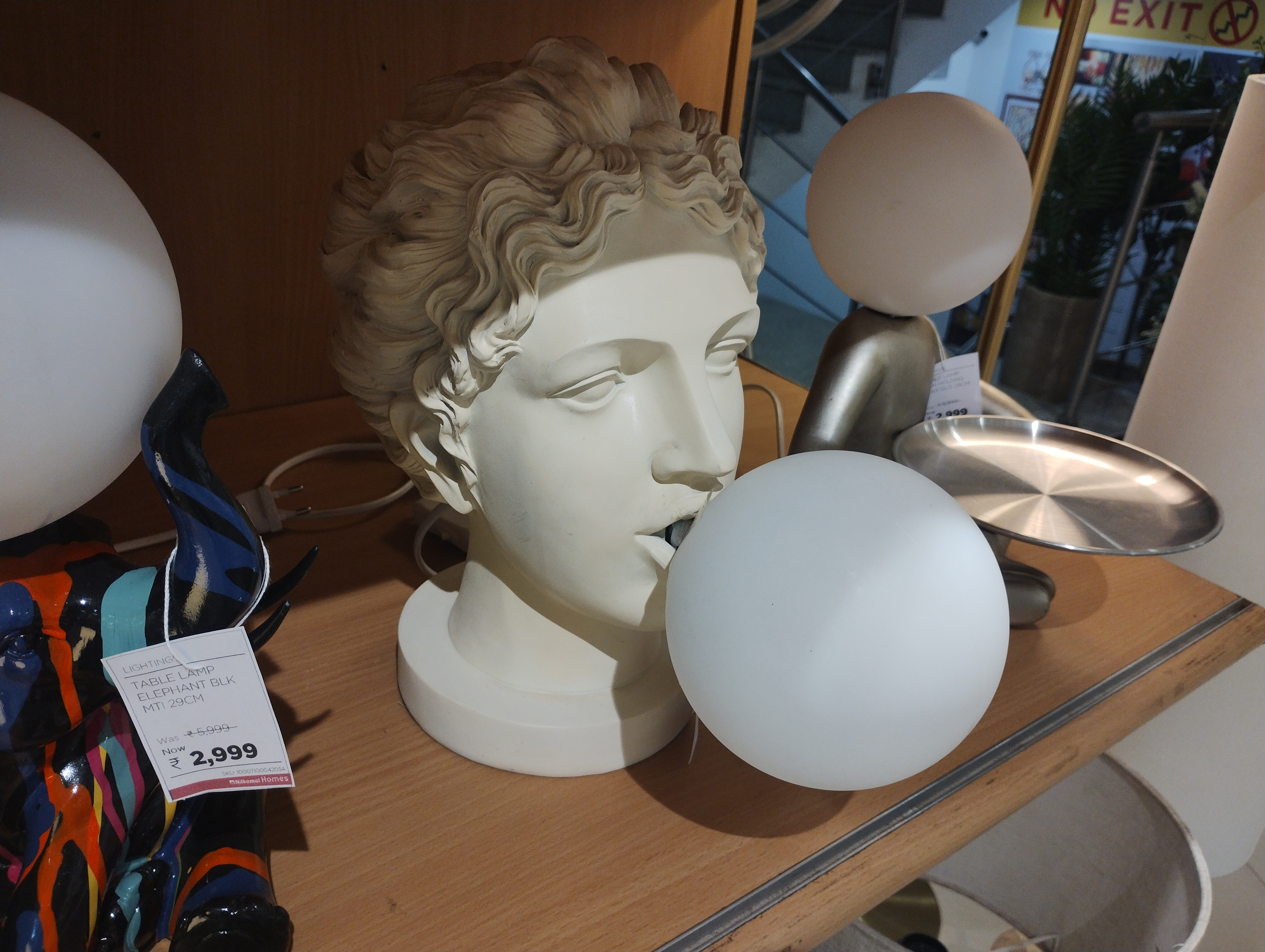

== See also ==
- Supreme Industries - notable competitor
