= Pepkor =

South African investment and holding company

Pepkor Holdings Limited
- Type: Public
- Traded as: JSE: PPH
- ISIN: ZAE000259479
- Industry: Retail; Finance
- Founded: 1965; 61 years ago
- Headquarters: Cape Town, South Africa
- Number of locations: 6,000+ (2025)
- Area served: Africa; Brazil
- Key people: Pieter Erasmus (CEO); Riaan Hanekom (CFO); Ian Kirk (Acting Chairperson)
- Revenue: ▲ R95.3 billion (2025)
- Operating income: ▲ R11.09 billion (2025)
- Net income: ▲ R5.63 billion (2025)
- Total assets: ▲ R115 billion (2025)
- Total equity: ▲ R63.24 billion (2025)
- Number of employees: 48,500 (2025)
- Subsidiaries: PEP; Ackermans; Incredible Connection; Shoe City; Refinery; HiFi Corp; BUCO; Dunns; Bradlows; FintechCo (57.1%)
- Website: pepkor.co.za

Pepkor (officially Pepkor Holdings Limited) is a South African investment and holding company, focused on the discount and value consumer retail, and fintech markets. When all of its brands are combined, as of 2025, it is the largest retail operator in Southern Africa by number of stores, processing around 2 billion transactions per year.

While the majority of Pepkor's operations are in South Africa, the company also operates in other African countries, as well as Brazil. It manages retail brands that sell predominantly clothing, footwear, and homeware, in addition to household furniture, appliances, consumer electronics, and building materials.

== History ==
The company was founded in 1965 by Renier van Rooyen. He opened his first chain store, the start of PEP Reef, in 1978. Formerly known as PEP stores, the company was renamed Pepkor Limited in 1982, with PEP stores becoming a subsidiary.

In 1998, Pepkor acquired Australian retailer Best & Less.

In 2011, the private equity company Brait bought a 24.6% stake in Pepkor for R4.18 billion, valuing the company at about R17 billion.

In 2012, Pepkor purchased the Australian department store chain Harris Scarfe from investment company Momentum Capital.

In November 2014, Steinhoff International acquired Pepkor for US$5.7 billion.

Pepkor was listed on the Johannesburg Stock Exchange in September 2017.

Pepkor expanded into selling affordable mobile phones and sells 12 million cellular handsets annually.

In February 2022, Pepkor acquired a majority stake in Brazilian retailer Grupo Avenida, marking the company's first foray into Latin America.

In February 2023, shareholder Ibex Topco B.V. reduced its stake in Pepkor from 50% to 43.89%. By September 2024, Ibex's shareholding had decreased further, to 30.18%.

In July 2025, Ibex's indirect subsidiaries Ainsley Holdings and SAHPL disposed of their stakes in Pepkor, thus reducing Ibex's shareholding in Pepkor to zero.

Also in 2025, Pepkor reported opening its 6,000th store. Of new stores opened during the company's 2025 financial year, 95 were PEP locations, 45 were for PEP Home, and a further 32 were for newly-launched adult womenswear brand Ayana. The company's Ackermans division also entered the menswear market for the first time, and announced plans to enter the cosmetics market in 2026.

Pepkor's fintech division performed particularly well in the 2025 financial year, with divisional revenue and gross profit increasing by 31.1% and 52.3% respectively. The group sold a total of 13.5 million smartphones during that financial year, accounting for eight out of every ten prepaid smartphones sold in South Africa. The group gained 1.3 million new credit clients, bringing its total number of active A+ credit book clients up to 3.5 million. Furthermore, the group received Prudential Authority approval to establish a new South African bank.

As part of this endeavor, Pepkor wholly acquired Cloudbadger, a fintech platform, to assist with the bank's formation. Cloudbadger was developed in-house by major South African insurance company OUTsurance Group, when the latter had plans to launch its own bank. However, these plans were canceled. At the time of the Pepkor acquisition, the Cloudbadger platform was owned by OUTsurance (45%), Standard Bank (45%), and Cloudbadger management (10%). The deal was valued at R206 million upfront, with an additional R100 million over four years, provided certain conditions were met.

Other acquisitions during 2025 include furniture retail chains OK Furniture and House & Home, and clothing retail chain Legit, Swagga, and Style. The latter added 469 stores to Pepkor's total locations.

In July 2026, Pepkor announced it intended to merge its Flash business with Shop2Shop, creating a new business called FintechCo. The new company would immediately become one of South Africa's largest fintech platforms, with a total value of R21.3 billion. As part of the deal, Pepkor will acquire a 57.1% stake in the new FintechCo, by purchasing R1.57 billion's worth of shares in Shop2Shop. Pepkor will also contribute 100% of its shares in Flash, valued at R10.6 billion. Pepkor said the move is part of its strategy to expand its Informal Market Platform segment. At the time, financial services as a whole contributed 15% towards Pepkor's total revenue, and Flash was processing payments worth over R200 billion a year.

== Operations ==
Pepkor's retail brands include PEP, Ackermans, Shoe City, Dunns, Tekkie Town, Refinery, S.P.C.C, CODE, Bradlows, Rochester, Sleepmasters, Incredible Connection, HiFi Corp, and BUCO. As of its 2025 financial year, the company had 6,000 locations.

As of 2025, across all of its brands, Pepkor operates over 6,000 stores across Africa and Brazil.

The clothing retail segment accounts for the vast majority of the group's revenue, at 72%. The company's fintech division generates 15% of its revenue, and a further 13% is generated by the combined categories of furniture, appliances, and electronics.

Pepkor's fintech operations provide financial and telecommunications services to customers in the formal and informal sectors. Its Flash business supports 200,000 small businesses in the informal sector. Pepkor's internally-developed PAXI parcel delivery service utilizes its large retail network.

== See also ==
- Retailing in South Africa
