= Ackermans =

South African clothing retail company

- Type: Subsidiary
- Industry: Retail
- Founded: 1916; 110 years ago
- Founder: Gus Ackerman
- Headquarters: Kuils River, Western Cape, South Africa
- Number of locations: 700
- Area served: South Africa, Namibia, Botswana, Lesotho, Eswatini
- Key people: Charl Cronje (MD)
- Products: Clothing, clothing accessories, footwear, homeware, cellular, financial services
- Revenue: ▲ R5 billion (2012)
- Number of employees: 3,622
- Parent: Pepkor
- Website: ackermans.co.za

Ackermans is a South African chain of clothing stores, and a subsidiary of major SA retail holding company Pepkor.

Founded in 1916 in Wynberg, Cape Town, Ackermans has over 700 stores across Southern Africa, including in Namibia, Botswana, Lesotho, and Eswatini, and is headquartered in Kuils River, near Cape Town.

In 2015, Ackermans was rated the second best clothing store by the South African Consumer Satisfaction Index.

== History ==
Ackermans began in 1916 when Gus Ackerman opened the very first store in Wynberg, Cape Town, South Africa.

In 1960, Ackermans was sold to Greatermans.

in 1970, Ackermans was sold to Edgars who maintained its successful price discounter position.

In 1984, Pepkor acquired Ackermans. At the time, there were 34 stores across the country.

By the turn of the century Ackermans grew to over 200 stores across Southern Africa. By the end of the 2002/2003 financial year their stores numbered 284.

In 2021, with more than 450 stores in Southern Africa, the business was set to exceed R5 billion in turnover. As of 2024, Ackermans operates more than 1000 stores.

== Awards ==
Ackermans have received many awards

Year	Award
2019/2020	Ask Afrika Icon Brands winner in the Children's Clothes category
2019	Beeld Readers’ Choice platinum winner in the Children's Clothing store category
2019	Daily Sun Readers’ Choice platinum winner in Best Baby Shop category
2019	Daily Sun Readers’ Choice platinum winner in the Best Clothing Shop (Children) category
2017/2018	Winner of the Children's Retail Category in the 2017/ 2018 Kasi Star Brands Survey
2016/2017	Winner of the Children's Retail Clothing Category in the 2016/2017 Kasi Star Brands Survey
2016/2017	Winner of the Children's Retail Clothing Category in the 2016/2017 Icon Brands Survey
2016	Winner for Kids Clothing – Best of Bloemfontein Reader's Choice Awards
2015	Top Energy and Water Efficiency Project of the Year: SWATT
2015	Winner for Kids Clothing – Best of Bloemfontein Reader's Choice Awards
2015	1st Runner-up for Children and Baby Clothing – The Times Sowetan Retail Awards
2014	Winner for Kids Clothing – Best of Bloemfontein Reader's Choice Awards
2014	1st Runner-up for Children and Baby Clothing – The Times Sowetan Retail Awards
2013	1st Runner-up for Kids Clothing – Best of Bloemfontein Reader's Choice Awards
2013	1st Runner-up for Children and Baby Clothing – The Times Sowetan Retail Awards
2012	1st Runner-up for Children and Baby Clothing – The Times Sowetan Retail Awards
2011	2nd Runner-up for Children and Baby Clothing – The Times Sowetan Retail Awards
2009	Winner for Children and Baby Store (Baby Company) – The Times Sowetan Retail Awards

== See also ==
- Retailing in South Africa
