= List of South African women artists =

This is a list of women artists who were born in South Africa or whose artworks are closely associated with that country.

== A ==
- Clare Abbott (1921–2008), illustrator
- Valerie Adler, painter and designer
- Chrysoula Argyros (born 1954), painter
- Jane Alexander (born 1959), sculptor, installation artist
- Julia Anastasopoulos (born 1983), artist, illustrator, designer, actress
- Beth Diane Armstrong (born 1985), sculptor

== B ==
- Beverly Barkat (born 1966), South-African born Israeli visual artist
- Mary Elizabeth Barber (1818–1899), amateur scientist, painter, poet
- Myfanwy Bekker (active since the 1970s), painter, ceramist, now living in Plettenberg Bay.
- Deborah Bell (born 1957), painter, sculptor
- Doris Bloom (born 1954), painter; incorporates performance art into her work
- Frida Blumenberg (born 1935), sculptor
- Dineo Seshee Bopape (born 1981), multimedia artist
- Candice Breitz (born 1972), artist working with video and photography, educator
- Sarah Britten (born 1974), writer, lipstick artist
- Rhona Brown (1922–2014), botanical artist

== C ==
- Sarah Calburn (born 1964)
- Bettie Cilliers-Barnard (1914–2010), abstract painter
- Julia Rosa Clark (born 1975), contemporary artist
- Gillian Condy (born 1953), botanical artist

== D ==
- Angela de Jesus (born 1982), visual artist, curator
- Mbali Dhlamini (born 1990)
- Ethel May Dixie (1876–1973), botanical artist
- Marlene Dumas (born 1953), visual artist, now in Amsterdam
- Delmaine Donson illustrator, visual artist, acrylic painter.

== F ==
- Faith47 (born 1979), multimedia artist
- Marianne Fannin (1845–1938), Irish botanical artist, worked in South Africa

== G ==
- Ambra Gambale (active since 2010), jewellery designer
- Allerley Glossop (1870–1955), painter
- Frances Goodman (born 1975)
- Sophy Gray (1814–1871), artist, architect
- Liza Grobler (born 1974), mixed media artist
- Louise Guthrie (1879–1966), botanist, botanical artist

== H ==
- Cecil Higgs (1898–1986), painter
- Philippa Hobbs (born 1955), art historian, artist
- Rosa Hope (1902–1972), English-born South African painter

== J ==
- Barbara Jeppe (1921–1999), botanical artist
- Svea Josephy (born 1969), fine arts photographer, educator

== K ==
- Marlise Keith (born 1972), artist working in ink, pencil, acrylics
- Gulshan Khan (born 1983), photographer

== L ==
- Maggie Laubser (1886–1973), painter, printmaker
- Cythna Letty (1895–1985), botanical artist
- Aileen Lipkin (1933–1994), painter, sculptor

== M ==
- Noria Mabasa (born 1938), sculptor, ceramist
- Esther Mahlangu (born 1935), Ndebele painter
- Anja Marais (born 1974), sculptor, multi-disciplinary artist
- Judith Mason (1938–2016), painter, mixed media artist, textile designer
- Jacki McInnes (born 1966), painter
- Ina Millman, artist and art teacher
- Nandipha Mntambo (born 1982), sculptor, video artist
- Sethembile Msezane (born 1991), visual artist, public speaker and performer
- Zanele Muholi (born 1972), photographer, video artist, installation artist

== N ==
- Allina Ndebele (born 1939), artist and weaver
- Robyn Nesbitt (born 1984), contemporary artist

== P ==
- Diana Page (born 1965), installation artist, now in Istanbul
- Carolyn Parton (born 1964), contemporary artist
- Barbara Pike (born 1933), botanical painter
- Karabo Poppy (born 1992), illustrator
- Deborah Poynton (born 1970), painter

== R ==
- Tracey Rose (born 1974), contemporary artist
- Arabella Elizabeth Roupell (1817–1914), British botanical artist working in South Africa

== S ==
- Ruth Sacks (born 1977), installation artist
- Berni Searle (born 1964), contemporary artist
- Katharine Saunders (1824-1901), British-born Colony of Natal botanical illustrator.
- Mmakgabo Helen Sebidi (born 1943), sculptor and painter in pastel, acrylic and oil paint
- Lerato Shadi (born 1979), performance artist, installation artist
- Mary Sibande (born 1982), sculptor
- Penny Siopis (born 1953), painter, installation artist
- Buhlebezwe Siwani (born 1987), multidisciplinary artist
- Doreen Southwood (born 1974), multimedia artist
- Mary Stainbank (1899–1996), sculptor
- Irma Stern (1894–1966), painter
- Pamela Stretton (born 1980), digital artist
- Maud Sumner (1902–1985), painter

== T ==
- Jill Trappler (born 1957), painter, weaver, installation artist
- Alys Fane Trotter (1862–1961), Irish poet and artist, remembered for her illustrations of the Cape district

== U ==
- Jeannette Unite (born 1964), Earth mining artist, collects minerals, oxides for art materials and photographs industrial sites.

== V ==
- Marjorie van Heerden (born 1949), writer, illustrator
- Thelma Van Rensburg (born 1969), artist working with ink, pencil and charcoal
- Minnette Vári (born 1968), installation artist
- Diane Victor (born 1964), artist, printmaker

== W ==
- Ellaphie Ward-Hilhorst (1920–1994), botanical artist
- Sue Williamson (born 1941), multimedia artist, curator

== Z ==
- Cynthia Zukas (1931– 2024), painter
