= IQhiya Collective =

South African artist collective

iQhiya is a network of young black women artists based in Cape Town and Johannesburg, South Africa. They specialise in a broad range of artistic disciplines including performance art, video, photography, sculpture and other mediums.

iQhiya is an isiXhosa word for the cloth women use on their heads to carry water vessels. This is meant to represent "unshakable power" and an infinite love for the collective.

== Members ==
The collective was originally formed by Asemahle Ntlonti, Bronwyn Katz, Buhlebezwe Siwani, Bonolo Kavula, Charity Kelapile, Lungiswa Gqunta, Pinky Mayeng, Sethembile Msezane, Sisipho Ngodwana, Thandiwe Msebenzi, and Thuli Gamedze.

=== Asemahle Ntlonti ===
Asemahle Ntlonti was born in 1993 in Cape Town, South Africa. She graduated from Michaelis School of Fine Art, University of Cape Town earlier this year. She was awarded Hoosein Mohamed Award for excellence is 2015 and the Barbaro Fairhead award for social responsibility in 2014. Ntlonti was top ten finalist for Barclays L’Atelier in 2016 and participated in Infecting The City. In 2015 she was a finalists for Sasol New Signatures. She is a member of iQhiya a collective of 11 black women in based in Cape Town, Johannesburg, South Africa and Botswana. Ntlonti recently had her first solo show, Kukho Isililo Somntu at Blank Projects, 2017. She continues to live and work in Cape Town.

=== Bonolo Kavula ===
Kavula creates a new art persona in the video piece titled, Messy, which is featured in the Zeitz MOCAA exhibition The Main Complaint. Her name is “Black Mona Lisa”. She is a rap artist but prefers to call herself a rap visual artist because she is a painter too. The work is a music video where Black Mona Lisa makes her debut as a solo artist and rap artist. Her voice is unapologetic and brave and very candour. “Black Mona Lisa” as a character is expressing her confidence in not only her craft as an artist but also having fun while doing so. She expresses her black female sexuality with freedom knowing she is being watched and heard.

Her video piece titled, You must be exhausted was a finalist in the Sasol New Signatures Art Competition (2014). She has also been part of various group exhibitions including Burr: Print and Purpose (Print Portfolio) and iQhiya Group Exhibition at AVA Gallery (Cape Town: 2016); New Monuments at Commune 1 (Cape Town: 2016); 3 881 days, blank lab and Furniture at Blank Projects (Cape Town: 2015, 2016) and the Sasol New Signatures at the Pretoria Art Museum (Pretoria: 2011).

Kavula. has been awarded the 2014 Katherine Harries Print Cabinet Award at University of Cape Town (Cape Town, South Africa) and her works are part of the Works of Art Committee collection also at University of Cape Town.

Bonolo Kavula’s work is featured in the Zeitz MOCAA exhibition, The Main Complaint (2018 – 2019).

=== Bronwyn Katz ===
Multi-disciplinary artist, Bronwyn Katz completed a Bachelor of Fine Arts in 2015, receiving the Simon Gerson Prize for a distinctive body of work related to collective history and memory linked to the spaces and objects around them. She has since exhibited throughout the globe, participating in shows such as Dak'Art (2016) in Senegal; the Kunsthale Kade, Netherlands (2017- 2018), as well as the Palais de Tokyo in Paris (2018). A Silent Line, Lives Here (curated by Marie-Ann Yemsi) is the result of a 6-month sponsored SAM Arts Project residency at the International des Arts in Paris and will be on show from 22 June to 9 September 2018. In 2021, Katz was shortlisted for the Future Generation Art Prize, with her work exhibited at PinchukArtCentre in Kyiv, Ukraine. She is represented by Blank Projects.

=== Buhlebezwe Siwani ===
Buhlebezwe Kamohelo Siwani is a visual artist living and working in Cape Town with a focus on performance, photography, sculpture and installation. She completed her Bachelor of Fine Arts (Honors) at the Wits School of Arts in Johannesburg in 2011 and her Masters in Fine Arts at the University of Cape Town Michaelis School of Fine Arts in 2015.

Thematically Siwani's work interrogates the patriarchal framing of the black female body and black female experience within the South African context, along with issues of spirituality and religion, femininity and colonialism. As an initiated sangoma, Siwani has also used her artistic practice to delve into religious subjects and the often-perplexing relationship between Christianity and African spirituality.

=== Lungiswa Gqunta ===
Lungiswa Gqunta (b.1990) is a visual artist working in performance, printmaking, sculpture and installation. She obtained her undergraduate degree at the Nelson Mandela Metropolitan University in 2012 and her MFA at the Michaelis School of Fine Arts in Cape Town in 2017. In addition to her independent practice, Gqunta is one of the founding members of iQhiya, with whom she recently participated in Documenta 14 and Glasgow International. Gqunta has been actively involved in the South African gallery scene and has exhibited with Zeitz Museum of Contemporary African Art, the Johannesburg Art Gallery (JAG) and has held two solo exhibitions, Qwitha (2018) and Qokobe (2016), with WHATIFTHEWORLD. Her work forms part of the public collections of the Nelson Mandela Metropolitan University, The University of Cape Town and Zeitz MOCAA. She has also recently participated in the Manifesta 12 Biennal and the 15th Istanbul Biennial.

=== Pinky Mayeng ===
Pinky Mayeng (RSA b. 1993) is a former undergraduate student at the Michaelis School of Fine Art. Her work is personal yet observational, she uses herself as a tool to explore or portray issues and ideas that surround her. These are things that she feels are overlooked yet hold a certain part within identity, whether it is the understanding and exploration of her own identity or navigating representation. While she works predominantly in the mediums of sculpture, paint, installation and photography she is now venturing into printmaking and video exploring how she can further express herself within these mediums. She is also part of iQhiya a collective of eleven black women artists based in South Africa and Botswana. Through her participation in iQhiya she has been in a group exhibition at the AVA and performed at Documenta 14 in Athens, Greece and Kassel, Germany.

=== Sethembile Msezane ===
Sethembile Msezane was born in 1991 in KwaZulu Natal, South Africa. She lives and works in Cape Town, South Africa. She was awarded a Masters in Fine Arts in 2017 from the Michaelis School of Fine Art, University of Cape Town, where she also completed her Bachelor of Fine Arts in 2012. Using interdisciplinary practice encompassing performance, photography, film, sculpture and drawing, Msezane creates commanding works heavy with spiritual and political symbolism. The artist explores issues around spirituality, commemoration and African knowledge systems. She processes her dreams as a medium through a lens of the plurality of existence across space and time, asking questions about the remembrance of ancestry. Part of her work has examined the processes of mythmaking which are used to construct history, calling attention to the absence of the black female body in both the narratives and physical spaces of historical commemoration.

Msezane is an OkayAfrica 100 women 2018 Honoree. Msezane was a TEDGlobal Speaker in Ausha, Tanzania (2017). She was a TAF & Sylt Emerging Artist Residency Award winner (TASA) (2016). Msezane is the first recipient of the Rising Light award at the Mbokodo Awards (2016). She is a Barclays L’Atelier Top 10 Finalist (2016). She is a Sasol New Signatures Merit Award winner (2015).

Msezane’s work has been widely exhibited across South Africa and internationally. It was included in All Things Being Equal…, the inaugural exhibition of the Zeitz MOCAA in Cape Town, and forms part of the museum’s collection, as well as that of the Iziko South African National Gallery in Cape Town, and the University of South Africa (UNISA), in Johannesburg. In 2015, during protests by the Rhodes Must Fall Movement, she presented the performance Chapungu – The Day Rhodes Fell at the removal of the Cecil John Rhodes statue at the University of Cape Town.

Recent solo presentations include Speaking Through Walls, Tyburn Gallery, London, England (2019); All Things Being Equal…, Zeitz MOCAA, Cape Town, South Africa (2017) and Kwasuka Sukela, Gallery MoMo, Cape Town, South Africa (2017).

Recent group exhibitions include Made Visible: Contemporary South African Fashion and Identity, Museum of Fine Arts, Boston, Dancing on a Volcano, Lagos Photo Festival, Lagos, Nigeria (2018), L’envol, La Maison Rouge, Paris, France (2018), Not a Single Story, NIROX Foundation, South Africa, and Wanås Konst, Sweden (2018), Cape to Tehran, Gallery MoMo, Cape Town, South Africa (2018); The Winter Sculpture Fair, Nirox Foundation Sculpture Park, Johannesburg, South Africa (2017); Re[as]sisting Narratives, Framer Framed, Amsterdam, Netherlands (2016); Women’s Work, Iziko South African National Gallery, Cape Town, South Africa (2016); Dance, if you want to enter my country! / Global Citizen, GoetheOnMain, Johannesburg, South Africa (2016) and iQhiya, The AVA Gallery, Cape Town, South Africa (2016).

In 2019 she performed Signal Her Return III at the New Art Exchange in Nottingham. 2018, she staged a performance for the ICA Arts Live Festival in Cape Town, as well as performing at the National Museum of Denmark in Copenhagen, as part of the conference Changing Global Hierarchies of Value? Museums, artifacts, frames, and flows, organized in association with the University of Copenhagen. She also performed at dOCUMENTA 14 in 2017 in both Athens, Greece, and Kassel, Germany, as part of iQhiya Collective. She has participated residencies including the Sylt Foundation Emerging Artist Residency, Sylt and Künstlerhäuser Worpswede, Germany (2017), and the Situate Arts Lab Residency, Hobart, Australia (2016).

=== Sisipho Ngodwana ===
Sisipho Ngodwana was born in Cape Town, 1993. She completed a BFA from the Michaelis School of Fine Art, UCT in 2015. In 2014 she was awarded the Hayden Lubisi award and she currently lives and works in Cape Town, as an associate director at Stevenson Gallery, a member of iQhiya and a practicing artist .

=== Thandiwe Msebenzi ===
Born in 1991, Thandiwe Msebenzi is a photographic artist who uses her images as a way to communicate her own experiences as a woman, and to connect this to larger conversations about how women are treated. In 2014 she graduated from Michaelis School of Fine Art at the University of Cape Town. She grew up in Nyanga, Cape Town and matriculated in 2010. That year she was selected to participate at the Iziko National Gallery. In 2013 she received an award for social involvement in photography for her third year work. In her fourth year (2014), she became the recipient of the Tierney Photography Fellowship Award.

=== Thuli Gamedze ===
Thulile Gamedze is a cultural worker, based in Cape Town, South Africa, situating her practice between writing, curating, teaching and art production. Thuli is a member of the art collective iQhiya.

== Artistic approach ==
The iQhiya is an art collective and network. Formed in June 2015 in Cape Town as a response to young black women artists voices being marginalized, thus forming a collective and network that can magnify their voices. It aims to create a safe space where women artists can share their concepts and ideas, and forms a network of women that can continuously display works of art as a collective and support each other's individual careers. They seek to contest and transform invisible institutional lines that consciously or unconsciously continue to marginalize black women voices in the art world.

The iQhiya collective has been connected to black feminist theory by recognizing mainstream feminism as a movement that previously tend to excluded the works of black women. Simultaneously, some members of iQhiya speak of black feminism and the importance of narrating black women stories.
