= Aphids (performance artists) =

Australian artist collective

Aphids are a feminist art collective from Melbourne, Australia currently comprising Lara Thoms and Mish Grigor.

Since its inception in 1994, Aphids have presented performances and experimental theatre works across Australia and internationally, including at Arts House, Melbourne, ANTI Contemporary Arts Festival, Finland and Jue Festival, Shanghai. Founded by inaugural Artistic Director David Young, followed by Willoh S. Weiland from 2010 to 2019, the collective is currently led by co-directors, Lara Thoms, Mish Grigor and Eugenia Lim.

== Work ==
Based at the Collingwood Arts Precinct and known for their experimental feminist performance art, Aphids are a leading contemporary performance company in Australia, incorporating live art, music, new technologies, sound and visual art.

- Howl (2016, 2018, 2020) presented at the Festival of Live Art, Melbourne, Perth Institute of Contemporary Art and the Art Gallery of NSW
- The Director (2018, 2019, 2020) presented at Arts House, SICK Festival, Manchester, and the International Theatre Festival Of Kerala, India
- Artefact (2016, 2017, 2018) presented at ANTI Contemporary Arts Festival and Perth Institute Contemporary Arts
