= Lungiswa =

Lungiswa is a given name of South African origin. Notable people with the name include:

- Lungiswa Gqunta (born 1990), South African sculptor and visual artist
- Lungiswa James, South African politician
