= Haapoja =

Haapoja is a surname. Notable people with the surname include:

- Juho Haapoja (born 1980), Finnish boxer
- Matti Haapoja (1845–1895), Finnish murderer
- Susanna Haapoja (1966–2009), Finnish politician
- Terike Haapoja (born 1974), Finnish visual artist
