= Wellcome Collection =

Museum and library in London, England

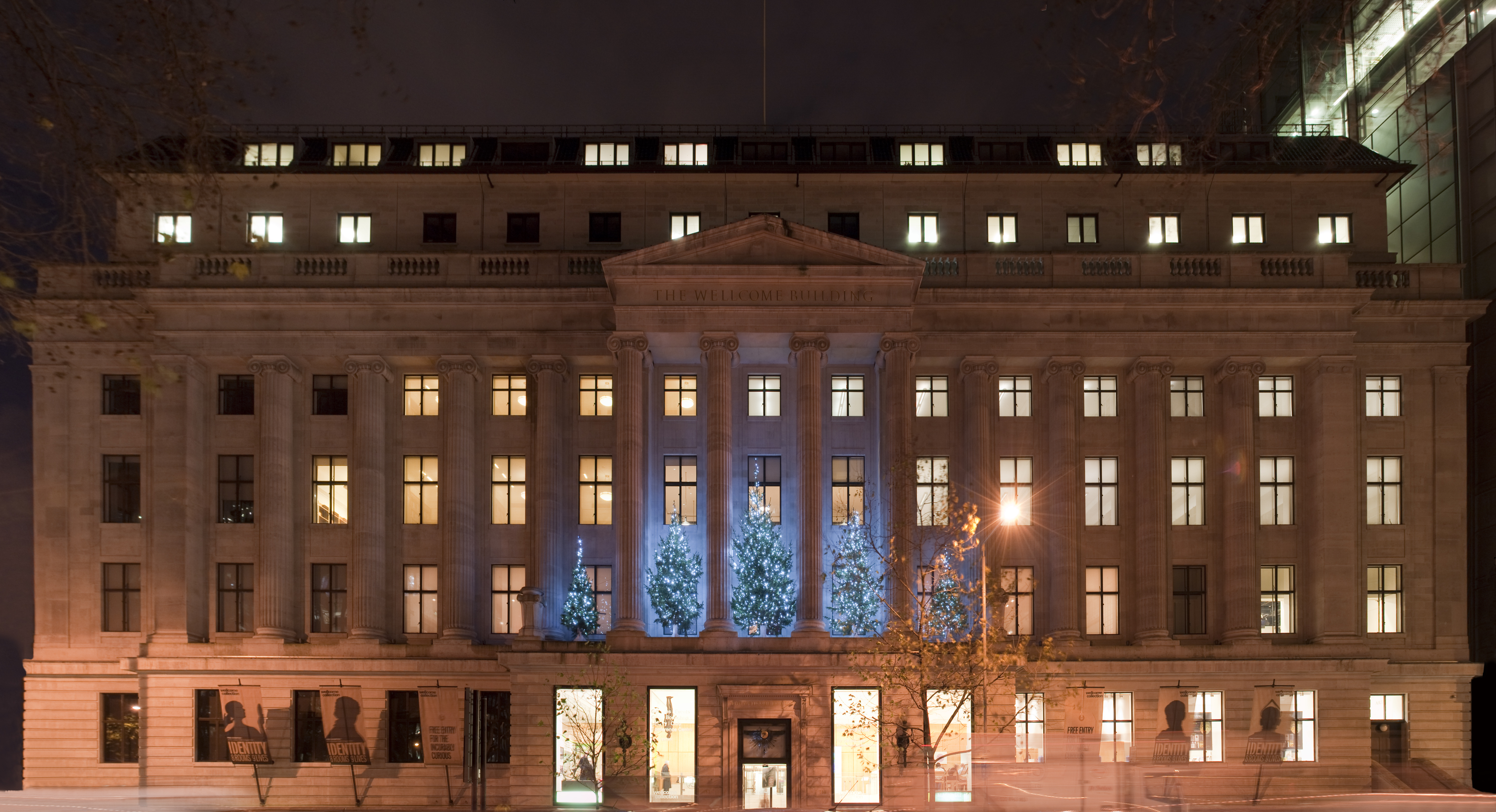
- Established: 2007
- Location: Euston Road; London, NW1; United Kingdom
- Coordinates: 51.525944°N 0.133889°W
- Type: Museum, library
- Collections: history of medicine
- Visitors: 550,000 per annum, as of 2013
- Founder: Henry Wellcome
- Director: Melanie Keen
- Public transit access: Euston Square; Euston
- Website: wellcomecollection.org

Wellcome Collection is a museum and library based at 183 Euston Road, London, England, displaying a mixture of medical artefacts and original artworks exploring "ideas about the connections between medicine, life and art". Founded in 2007, the Wellcome Collection has over 550,000 visitors per year.

The venue puts on exhibitions of contemporary historic art and artefacts, and has a café, bookshop and conference facilities. In addition to its physical facilities, Wellcome Collection maintains a website of original articles and archived images related to health.

== History and development ==
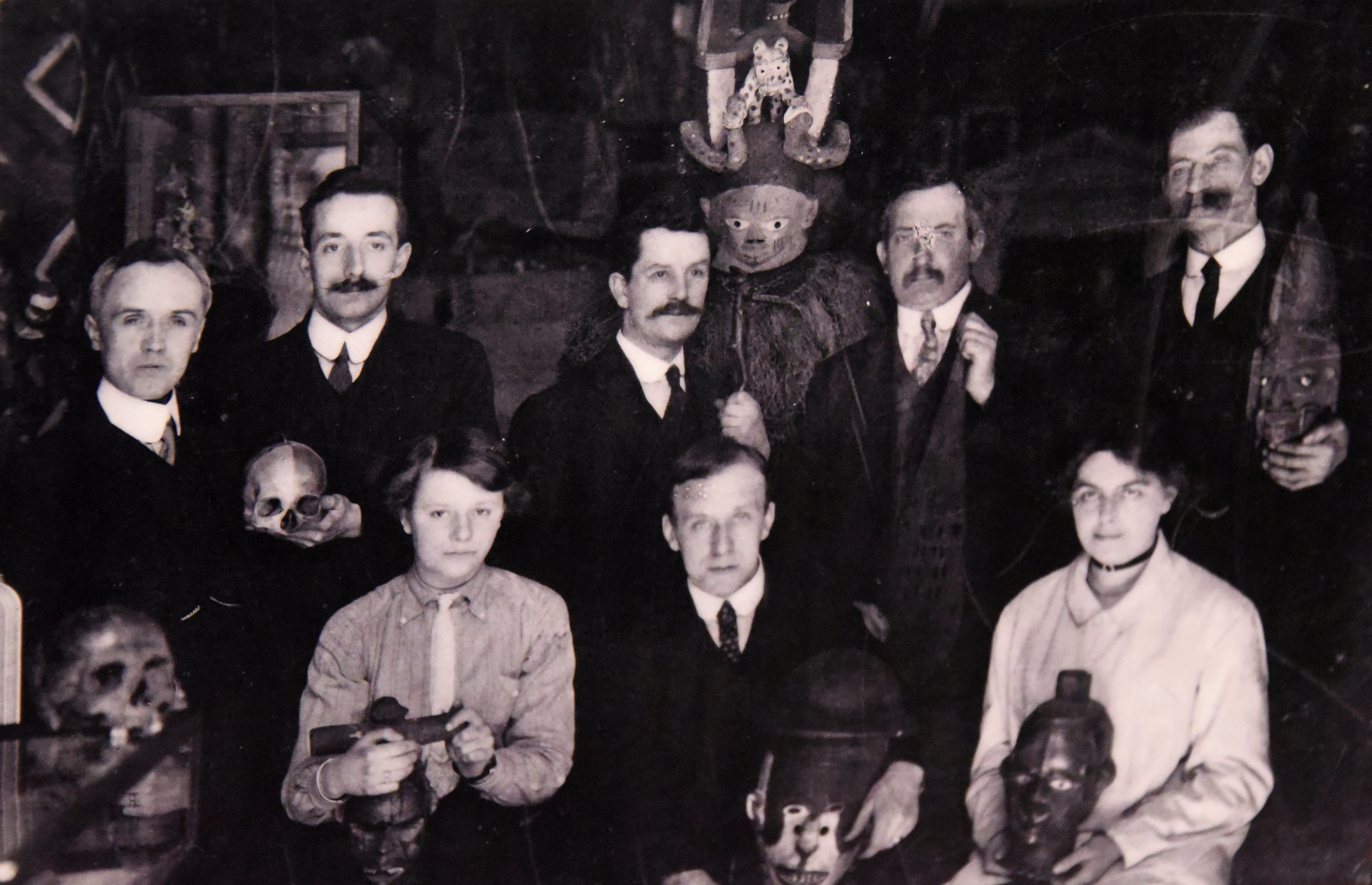
Staff at the Wellcome Historical Medical Museum, c. 1915

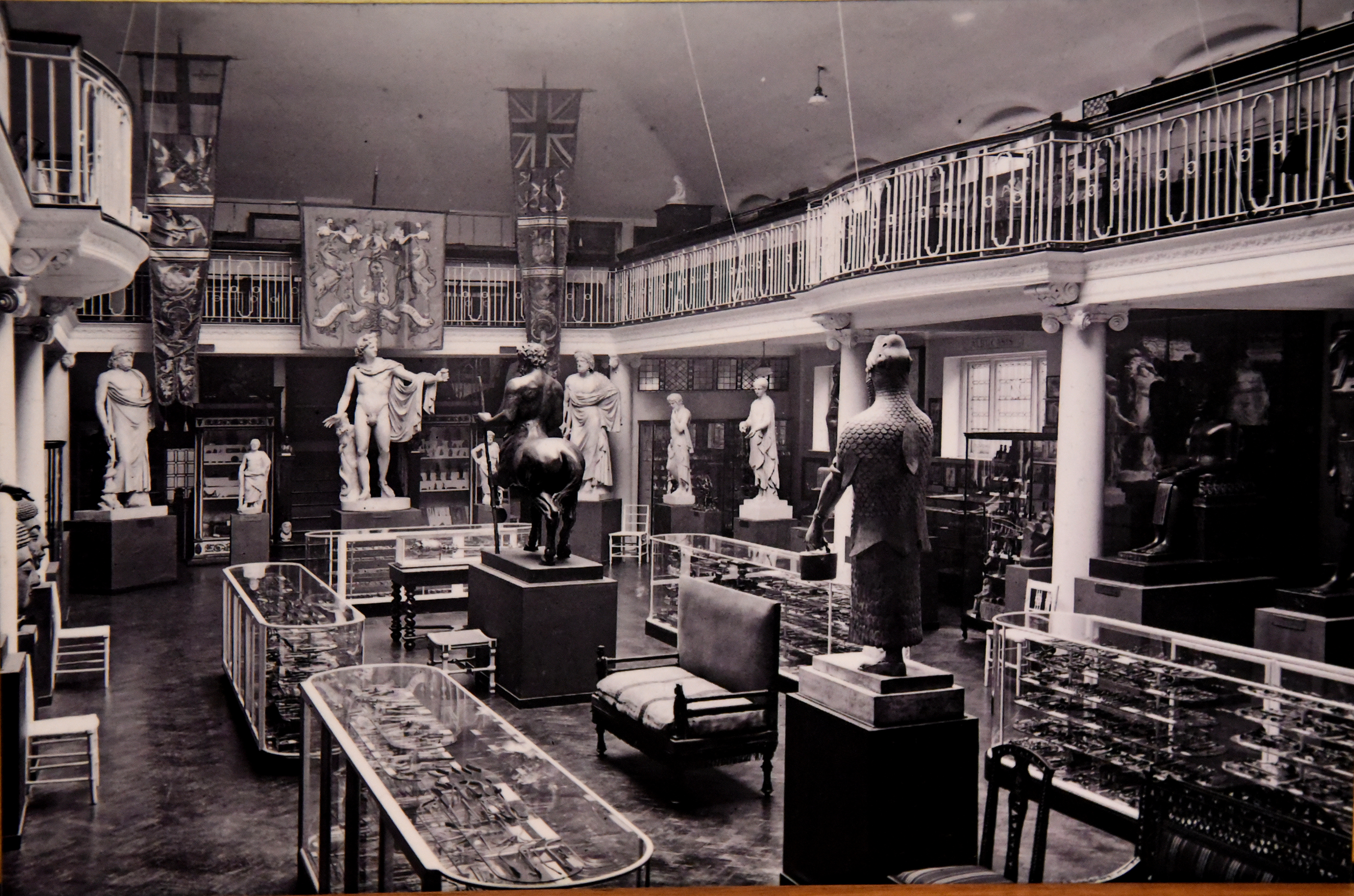
Hall of Statuary, Wellcome Historical Medical Museum, Wigmore Street, London, c. 1926. Unknown photographer. The Wellcome Collection, London

Wellcome Collection is part of the Wellcome Trust, founded by Sir Henry Solomon Wellcome (1853–1936). An extensive traveller, Wellcome amassed a huge collection of books, paintings and objects on the theme of historical development of medicine worldwide. There was an earlier Wellcome Historical Medical Museum at 54a Wigmore Street, housing artefacts from around the world.

The Wellcome Trust moved its administrative offices into their new Gibbs Building (designed for the Trust by Michael Hopkins and Partners) on the adjoining site in Euston Road, completed 2004, thereby creating an opportunity for a new public venue in the old Wellcome Building. The collection opened to the public in June 2007.

Queen Elizabeth II at the museum in 1962.

Due to its historical holdings, the Wellcome Collection is a member of The London Museums of Health & Medicine group.

Having been open since 2007, Wellcome Collection re-opened with additional public spaces in October 2015.

Sam Owen took over as the interim director of the Wellcome Collection in 2026, replacing Melanie Keen.

== Collection practices ==
Henry Wellcome's collection practices have subsequently come under greater scrutiny, particularly regarding the circumstances under which some objects entered his collection. In 2021, the Collection acknowledged that Wellcome’s collecting was shaped by colonialism: many objects bought at auction in the late 19th and early 20th century had no documentation stating how they had been acquired, and may have been "unjustly taken" from communities across Europe, Asia, Africa, and the Middle East.

The Collection has since committed to work with communities to better understand the provenance of its inventory. In 2025, the Collection returned a group of Jain manuscripts to India after researchers found they had been acquired without the consent of the communities to which they belonged.

== Wellcome Library ==
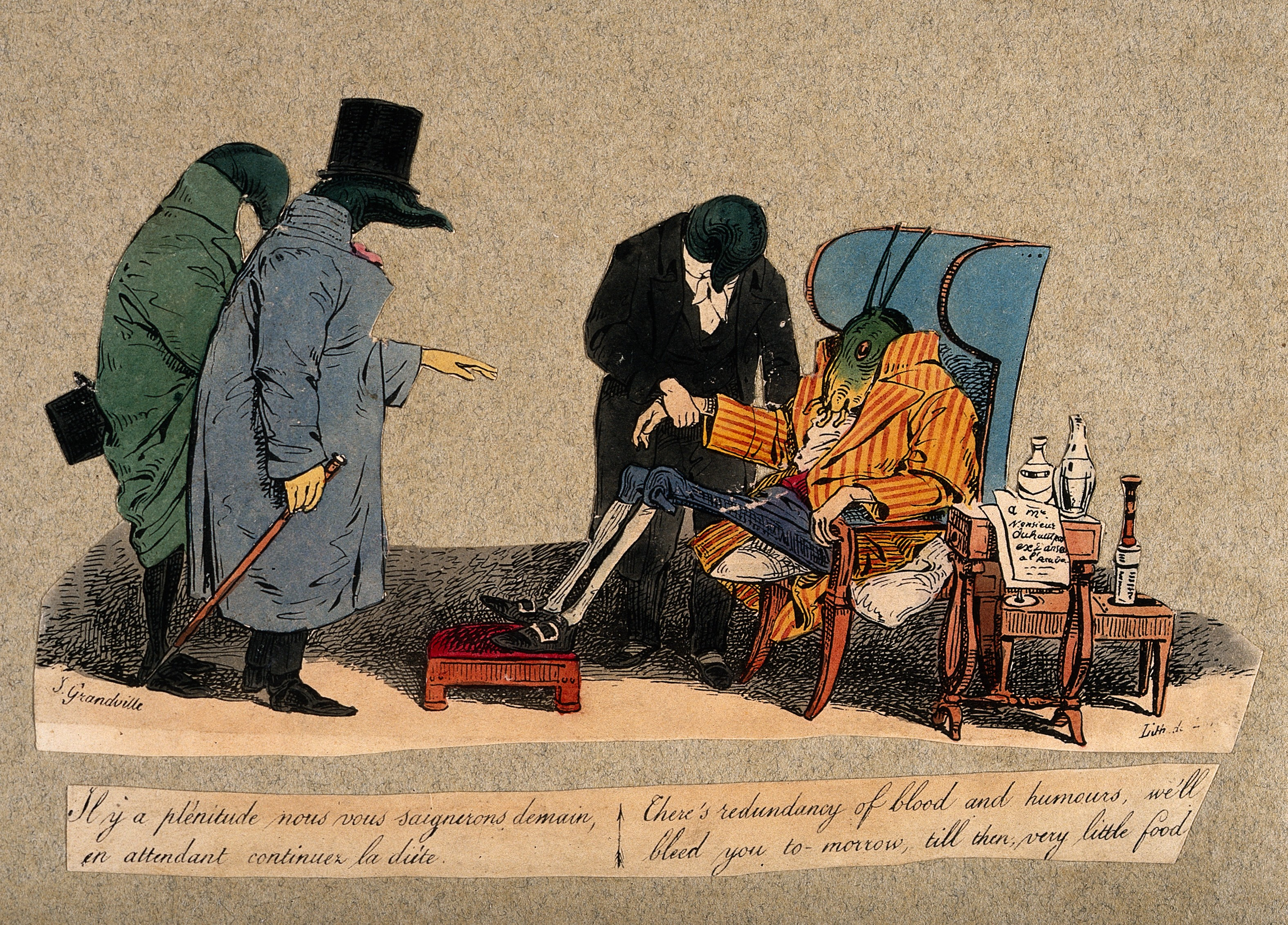
Three leeches attend a grasshopper, prescribing a course of bloodletting, cartoon by Jean-Ignace-Isidore Gérard c.1832. Wellcome Library collections.

The Wellcome Library provides access to collections of books, manuscripts, archives, films and pictures on the history of medicine from the earliest times to the present day.

== The Hub ==
Located on the 5th floor of the Collection, The Hub is a space for researchers to collaborate, which "brings together different voices and expertise as part of an experiment to see what new knowledge can be created".

The first residents of The Hub, Hubbub, explored the dynamics of "rest, noise, tumult, activity and work" from October 2014 to July 2016.

In October 2016 – July 2018 Created Out of Mind, a group exploring dementia and the arts began their residency. "Many of the group’s core members came from the Dementia Research Centre (DRC) at University College London. The team aimed to explore what dementia means to all of us, as well as challenging definitions of the condition".

From 2018 to 2020, creative arts company and charity Heart n Soul took up residency at The Hub "exploring ideas like ‘normality’ and the value of difference between us all".

== The Reading Room ==
Refurbished in 2015 as part of the Wellcome Collection's 2015 renovation, the Reading Room is open to the public.

== Collections ==
The collection is divided into several galleries. Being Human is a permanent exhibition opened in 2019 designed with the help of disabled artists and activists within the frame of the social model of disability, making it one of the world's most accessible galleries. Being Human explores what it means to be human in the 21st century, with a focus on personal stories, and is split into four parts: genetics, minds and bodies, infection, and environmental breakdown. It includes art by Yinka Shonibare CBE, Latai Taumoepeau, Kia LaBeija, Mary Beth Heffernan, and Isaac Murdoch's "Water is Life" banner designed for the Standing Rock protests.

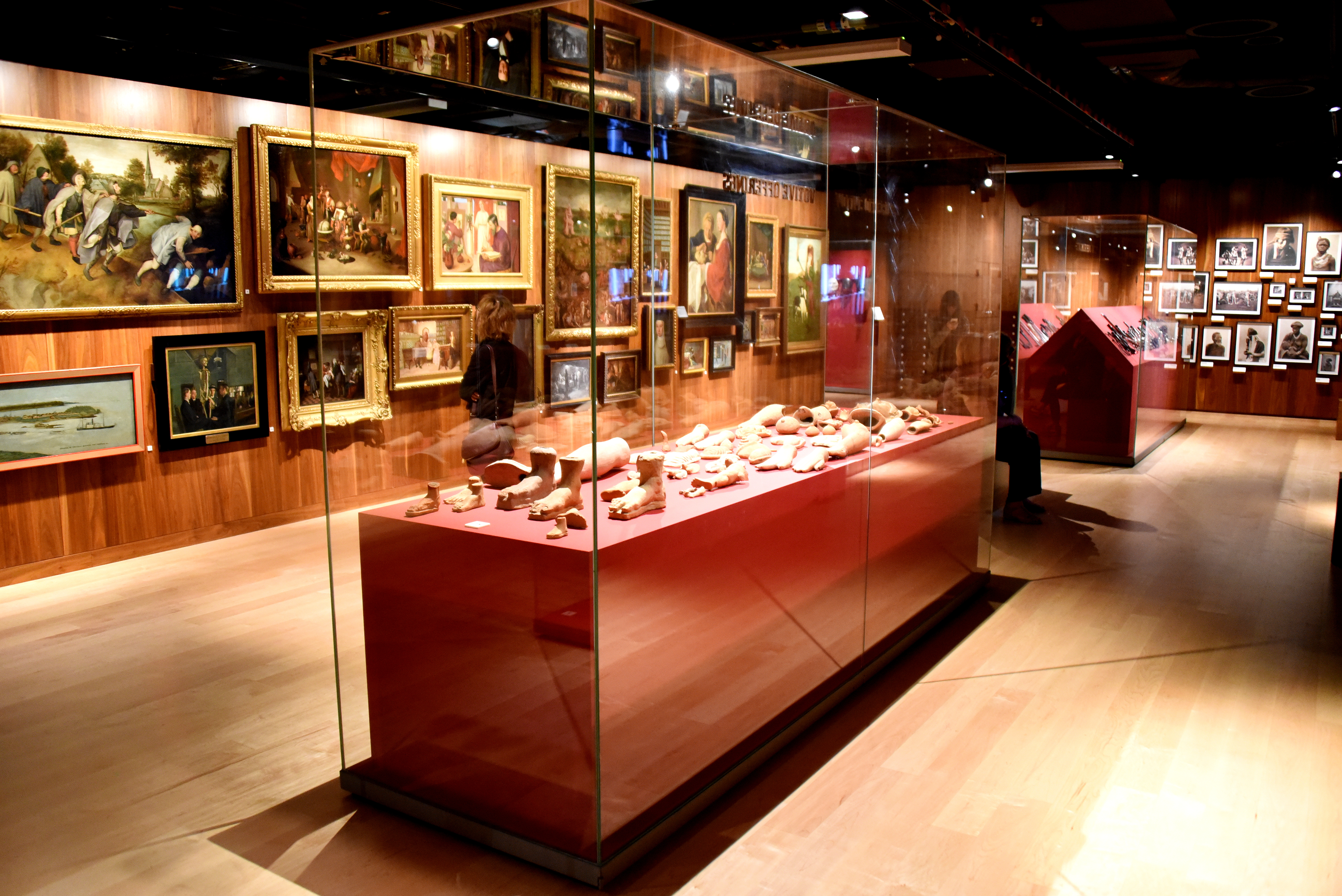
The Medicine Man gallery in 2016

The museum previously hosted Medicine Man, a permanent exhibition displaying a small part of Henry Wellcome's collection. The exhibition closed permanently on 27 November 2022 after running for fifteen years. While part of an ongoing programme to update how the collection is displayed, the closure was perceived to be a result of concerns over "racist, sexist and ableist theories and language".

The main exhibition space hosts a changing programme of events and exhibitions. The space has included work by Felicity Powell and Bobby Baker. In 2024, an exhibition highlighting the exploitation of workers, and entitled Hard Graft: Work, Health and Rights, included work by Cindy Sissokho, Lindsey Mendick, Lubaina Himid, Louise Bourgeois, Kelly O'Brien and Shannon Alonzo.

The building foyer and public areas usually include a 1950 work by Pablo Picasso (originally on a wall in John Desmond Bernal's flat in Torrington Square) and one by Antony Gormley. A figure by Marc Quinn was originally lying unprotected on the stone floor, then moved inside a glass case, and is also not currently on view. The collection includes 17,500 magic-medical amulets, talismans and charms picked up by Henry Wellcome in Islamic North Africa and elsewhere in the world.

Wellcome Collection is digitising and openly licensing its collection; as of January 2020 it had made over 40 million images from 325,000 items (books, manuscripts, archives, artworks, audio and video material etc.) available on wellcomecollection.org and via a range of third-party services.
