= Donaufestival =

Music festival

‘‘Donaufestival’’ is an annual festival of music, performance, art, film and discourse that takes place in spring in Krems an der Donau, Lower Austria, Austria. In the festival’s early years, two cities were used as locations: Krems and Korneuburg. Since 2007, however, the festival has only been held in Kerms.

The festival typically showcases avant-garde rock, experimental music, performance art, noise, electronic music and other contemporary artistic forms.

== Artists who have played at the Donaufestival ==
2005	2006	2007	2008	2009	2010	2011	2012	2013	2014
Chicks on Speed; Alec Empire; Foetus; Xiu Xiu; Prefuse 73; Zeitkratzer; Sleater-Kinney; Liars; Alvin Curran; Naked Lunch; Radian; Pan Sonic; Jamie Lidell; Amon Tobin; Cristian Vogel	Keiji Haino; Trail of Dead; Mouse on Mars; Mike Patton; Autechre; Stuart Staples; Mogwai; Terre Thaemlitz; Vladislav Delay; Matthew Herbert; Faust; The Dresden Dolls; Wolf Eyes; Battles; No-Neck Blues Band; A Silver Mt Zion	Current 93; Sunn O))); Matmos; Om; Pantaleimon; Simon Finn; Julia Kent; Annie Anxiety; Fovea Hex; Larsen; Nurse With Wound; Bonnie Prince Billy; Six Organs of Admittance; Gang of Four; Zeitkratzer; Alan Vega; Throbbing Gristle; Boredoms; Phill Niblock; Haswell & Hecker; KTL	Fischerspooner; The Go! Team; Melvins; Amon Tobin; Tortoise; Jay-Jay Johanson; Clark; Xiu Xiu; Apse; Liars; Die Goldenen Zitronen; Naked Lunch; Tim Hecker; The Hidden Cameras; Health; John Wiese; Fuckhead; Phosphorescent; Magik Markers; Radiohole	Sonic Youth; Aphex Twin; Antony and the Johnsons; Butthole Surfers; CocoRosie; Spiritualized; The Cesarians; Boys Noize; Luke Vibert; Goblin; Sunset Rubdown; Black Dice; Moderat; Fennesz; The Raincoats; Yacht; Yo! Majesty; DAT Politics; Mirror/Dash; We have Band	Rufus Wainwright; Peaches; Theo Adams Company; Wolf Parade; Panda Bear; Dinosaur Jr.; múm; Glenn Branca; Tindersticks; Xiu Xiu & Deerhoof; Dan Deacon; Fuck Buttons; Alec Empire; The Ex; Akufen; Ben Frost; These New Puritans; Matmos; Parenthetical Girls; Cobra Killer; Ja, Panik	John Cale; Ladytron; Death From Above 1979; The Books; Diplo; Laurie Anderson; James Blake; Tim Hecker; Max Hattler & Noriko Okaku; Owen Pallett; Wild Beasts; Lydia Lunch; Gonjasufi; Hudson Mohawke; Rhys Chatham; Carla Bozulich; Nadja; Mount Kimbie; Gold Panda; Chris Watson; Ben Frost; The Irrepressibles; Valgeir Sigurðsson; Wildbirds & Peacedrums; Kap Bambino; WU LYF	CocoRosie; Squarepusher; Ariel Pink's Haunted Graffiti; Atlas Sound; Pantha du Prince; Oneohtrix Point Never; Chairlift & Bell; Busdriver with Nomi Ruiz; Lesbians on Ecstasy; Hercules and Love Affair; The Field; Chris Cunningham; Sissy Nobby & Antony; And Also the Trees; Seefeel; Lustmord	!!!; How to Dress Well; Suuns; Simian Mobile Disco; Death Grips; Actress; Biosphere; Darkstar; Ghostpoet; Laurel Halo; Martin Rev; Jenny Hval; The Gaslamp Killer; Thunderdrone; snd; Robert Hood; Michael Rother; Manorexia; Kasper T. Toeplitz; Carlos Amorales	Julie Monaco; Back to the Future; William Kentridg; Constantin Luser; Finnbogi Petursson; Hans Schabus; Dries Verhoeven; Santiago Sierra; Emi Honda & Jordan McKenzie; Robert Henke; Liz Rosenfeld; Macular; God's Entertainment; Roly Porter; Ebe Oke; Jon Hopkins; Oneohtrix Point Never; Mouse on Mars; Tim Hecker; Body/Head

== See also ==
- Donauinselfest - free open-air music festival held annually at Donauinsel in Vienna, Austria
