= Gambale =

Gambale is a surname. Notable people with the surname include:

- Ambra Gambale, South African and Italian artist and jewellery designer
- Diego Gambale, (born 1998), Italian footballer
- Frank Gambale (born 1958), Australian jazz guitarist
- Giuseppe Gambale (born 1964), Italian politician
- Mary Gambale (born 1988), American tennis player
- Rodrigo Gambale (born 1984), Brazilian politician
