= Tania El Khoury =

Lebanese live artist

Dr Tania El Khoury
- Born: 1982 (age 43–44); Jounieh, Lebanon
- Education: Lebanese University (BA); Goldsmiths, University of London (MA); Royal Holloway, University of London (PhD)
- Style: Live art
- Awards: ANTI – Contemporary Art Festival International Prize for Live Art (2017); Soros Arts Fellow (2019)

Tania El Khoury (born 1982) is a Lebanese live artist. In 2017, she was winner of the ANTI – Contemporary Art Festival International Prize for Live Art, the only international award for live art, attracting a EUR30,000 prize. Her work has been translated into multiple languages and shown in 32 countries across six continents. She is also visiting professor, festival curator and Director of the Center for Human Rights and the Arts at Bard College.

Her work has involved creating immersive performances in many different sites, ranging from the great hall at the British Museum to an old church in Beirut once used as a military base during the civil war.

Her exhibition, Gardens Speak, considered the Syrian uprising against the Assad regime. It presented the reconstructed oral histories of 10 men and women who died between 2011 and 2013, and were buried not in public cemeteries, but in the back gardens of ordinary homes. It led to an accompanying book, published by Tadween in 2016.

El Khoury is the co-founder of the Dictaphone Group, with architect and urban planner Abir Saksouk. In 2018, a survey of her work entitled "ear-whispered by Tania El Khoury" took place in the city of Philadelphia, USA, organized by Bryn Mawr College and supported by Pew Center for the Arts and Heritage.

She completed a PhD at Royal Holloway, University of London, focusing on interactive live art after the Arab uprisings, supervised by Professor Harriet Hawkins and supported by a scholarship from the Arts and Humanities Research Council. Prior to this, she earned an MA (with distinction) in Performance Making at Goldsmiths, University of London and a BA in Fine Art from the Lebanese University, Beirut. Her work was also recognised with the Total Theatre Award for Innovation and the Arches Brick Award in 2011.

El Khoury was selected as a 2019 Soros Arts Fellow, where 11 of the selected artists, filmmakers, curators and researchers whose work involved immigration were granted US$80,000 each "to realize an ambitious project over the next 18 months."

== Selected publications ==
- El Khoury, T (2016) Gardens Speak, Tadween, Washington DC, ISBN 1939067200
- El Khoury, T (2016) Swimming in Sewage, Performance Research, 21:2, 138–140
- El Khoury, T & Pearson, D (2015) Two Live Artists in the Theatre, Performance Research, 20:4, 122–126
- El Khoury, T (2013) The Contested Scenography of the Revolution, Performance Research, 18:3, 202–205
- El Khoury, T (2012) Sexist and Racist People Go to the Theatre Too, Performing Ethos 3 (2), 209–212

== Selected works ==
- The Search for Power (2018) - in collaboration with historian Ziad Abu-Rish exploring the history of power outages in Lebanon in an interactive and lecture performance in which the audience viewed archives collected from five different countries. In 2017, El Khoury was the ANTI Festival International Prize for Live Art winner, and received a production grant to return to the festival the following year, where she presented this piece.
- As Far As My Fingertips Take Me (2016) - a one-on-one performance, performed by Basel Zaraa. An encounter through a gallery wall between one audience member and a refugee. The piece was translated into multiple languages and has toured globally.
- Gardens Speak (2014) - El Khoury drew inspiration from a picture she had seen on social media of a woman burying her deceased son in her garden, after he was killed at the beginning of the Syrian uprising by the Assad regime. In the immersive performance, only 10 participants are allowed at a time. They have to pick a card with a name and match it to the wooden tombstone, once the audience member has found the correct grave, they dig. Shoe-less and protected by a plastic poncho, the audience members have to excavate, not to find bones, but a voice telling the stories of those who lost their lives during the regime. The production has been touring globally.
- The Sea Is Mine (2012) - looking at Beirut's beach resorts and the blockage it has created when accessing public beaches in the area, as the issue has quickly grown since the Lebanese civil war (1975 - 1990). In the performance, El Khoury attempts to swim into one of the many resorts for free. Prior to the staging, she shared booklets with fishermen and around the city, where a map of the city pin pointing the history of the resort-filled coastline.
- Maybe If You Choreograph Me, You'll Feel Better (2011) - while El Khoury stands on the street with headphones, the audience stands and watches through a window, while a male audience member dictates her actions, chooses a name and a costume for her. "Results were seldom pretty, as the men frequently abused their power." Exploring the relationship with the female performance and the male gaze; it debuted in 2011 at the Forest Fringe.
- Tell Me What I Can Do (2018)
- Ear-whispered: works by Tania El Khoury (2018)
- Sejjaħ lil Malta (Call Malta) (2018)
- Un-Marry Us (2017)
- Stories Of Refuge (2013)
- Jarideh (2010)
- Fuzzy (2009)
- Dictaphone Group.
- Bank Robbery?
- Actions Against an Apocalyptic Future
- Culture Exchange Rate
- Possible Damage (2011)
- Visual Newsflash (2005)
- Leave to Remain (2010)
- La Danaide (2005 - 2007)
- No Place Called Home (2007 - 2008)
