= Aileen Lipkin =

- Born: 1933; Johannesburg, South Africa
- Died: 1994 (aged 60–61)
- Education: Central School of Art and Crafts
- Occupation: Artist
- Known for: Painting Sculpture

Aileen Lipkin (1933–1994) was a prominent South African artist.

== Artistic career ==
Born in 1933 in Johannesburg, South Africa, Aileen Lipkin began her artistic journey early, facing financial challenges and the loss of her mother at 15. Initially working in commercial art, she transitioned to fine arts with her husband Lee Lipkin's support and mentorship under Arthur Goldreich. Her first solo exhibition, in 1960 at Lidchi Art Gallery in Johannesburg, featured detailed sketches of African workers and received positive recognition.

Moving to London, Aileen studied at the Central School of Art and Crafts and focused on her art, leading to solo exhibitions at John Whibley Gallery in 1961 and 1962. Her work, inspired by European rural life and nuns from the Sisters of Mercy order, achieved international recognition, with her Walking Nuns painting selling thousands of copies worldwide. After returning to South Africa in 1963, she continued her success with an exhibition at Adler Fielding Gallery, including her best-selling print, Woman on a Donkey.

In 1964 Aileen held another solo exhibition in London, featuring scenes from Israel, Greece, and South Africa. She then paused public exhibitions for three years to explore new aesthetic forms, focusing on landscape and resilience. This led to the creation of The Green Line in 1965, an abstract work inspired by the regenerative force of nature—now housed in the Iziko South African National Gallery. Her exploration of abstraction continued, culminating in her 1967 Africa – Landscape within Landscape exhibition at the Grosvenor Gallery in London.

During this period, Aileen Lipkin created the African Growth suite, a series of six panels displayed at the Gulbenkian Foundation exhibition in Lisbon in 1968, depicting the life cycle of organic growth. She was one of seven artists representing contemporary South African art in Lisbon. Simultaneously, she was commissioned to create four abstract mural panels, titled The Discovery of Gold in the Witwatersrand, for the President Hotel in Johannesburg.

In 1969 the Sage Fund commissioned Aileen for their annual report. Additionally, she contributed a painting for the cover of Maurice Tyack's book South Africa – Land of Challenge, further establishing her as an artist engaged with South African themes. After her successful Africa – Landscape within Landscape exhibition, Aileen transitioned to a minimalist, conceptual style, creating white-on-white and black-on-black paintings with geometric forms. Her 1969 exhibition at Gallery 101 in Johannesburg featured minimalist works and received positive attention despite some initial skepticism.

Aileen's exploration of minimal paintings, characterized by heavy paint masses and shadow effects, led her toward sculptural works and plastic molding, including Emergent Province. She also experimented with metal reliefs, creating notable pieces like the large panels at the Sable Centre in Johannesburg and Growth of Urban Society at the Natal Provincial Administration Building in Pietermaritzburg, featuring chrome-plated mild steel that reflected the motion and vibrancy of contemporary life.

Aileen's exploration into steel led to kinetic sculptures, introducing movement and dynamic elements to her art. In 1973, she created the Echo series, inspired by rippling reflections in her metallic works, incorporating stained-paper collages and three-dimensional constructions exploring reflection and movement.

In late 1974 Aileen traveled to Northwest Africa, exploring Mali and the Ivory Coast. The resilience and stoicism of the Mandingo kingdom, along with the vibrant markets of Bamako and Timbuktu, shifted her focus to capturing daily life with urgency and authenticity. The spiritual life of the Malians, marked by acceptance of fate, inspired her to appreciate the harmony of living with circumstances.

After the tragic loss of her husband, Lee, in mid-1975, Aileen won a competition to erect the Growth sculpture in Johannesburg. In October 1975 she revisited Northwest Africa, further immersing herself in West African cultures, which deeply influenced her work. Her sketches and observations from these travels were published in From Bamako to the Dogon Country – October 1975, reflecting her engagement with diverse African cultures.

In 1976 Aileen completed Growth, an eight-meter-tall stainless steel sculpture, the tallest free-standing sculpture in Johannesburg at the time. She began using stainless steel exclusively for her larger sculptures, valuing its reflective qualities and environmental integration. These works were showcased in solo exhibitions at the Goodman Gallery in Johannesburg in 1977 and 1978.

By 1979, seeking rejuvenation, Aileen traveled to London, Paris, and Israel, where she became inspired to explore the Sinai desert. Her visit to the desert, guided by a Bedouin, marked a profound personal transformation. This experience led her to adopt a raw fruit and vegetable diet and study Egyptology, spiritual philosophy, reincarnation, and the occult.

Aileen briefly returned to South Africa before feeling compelled to further explore the Middle East, visiting Egypt, the Sinai desert, Gaza, Jericho, and Jerusalem. These travels significantly influenced her art, emphasizing the power of solitude and transformative experiences. Upon her return in 1980, she was deeply affected by Egypt's ancient history, which shaped her work and culminated in her 1984 exhibition Dungman at the Goodman Gallery in Johannesburg.

Dungman, the centerpiece of this exhibition, reflected themes of environmental awareness and the concept of living in harmony with nature. The artwork depicted a scarab beetle set against a backdrop of technology and consumer culture, emphasizing the role of nature in sustaining life. Recognized for its artistic and environmental significance, Dungman was acquired by the Iziko South African National Gallery.

During this period, Aileen's work reflected the wisdom of ancient Egyptians, particularly their understanding of life, death, and nature. She connected their insights with modern environmental challenges, using her art to bridge ancient wisdom with contemporary issues. One notable work from this time, The Party Is Over triptych, employed traditional impasto layering techniques to explore these themes.

== Devotional career ==
In early 1984 Aileen visited Sai Baba's ashram in Bangalore, India, an experience that deepened her spiritual journey and led her to connect with the International Society for Krishna Consciousness later that year. Through Bhakti yoga, she found clarity and embraced a simpler, spiritually focused lifestyle.

In 1985 Aileen created artworks reflecting her spiritual insights, including a piece depicting A. C. Bhaktivedanta Swami Prabhupada. She then produced The Eye Opener series, based on Srimad-Bhagavatam and the Bhagavad Gita, contrasting materialistic life with spiritual enlightenment. The series is now housed in the Johannesburg Art Gallery.

During this period, Aileen received formal initiation into the practice of Bhakti yoga by Giriraj Swami, receiving the spiritual name Arca Vigraha Devi Dasi. Her spiritual and artistic paths intertwined, as seen in 1989 when she contributed portraits of Giriraj Swami and was commissioned to create a sculpture for the Braude College of Engineering in Israel.

In 1989 Aileen purchased land in Vrindavan, India, a town sacred to Bhakti yoga practitioners, and oversaw the construction of a house there. In May 1991, after a second cancer diagnosis, she moved permanently to Vrindavan, choosing to spend her remaining days there. In 1992 she was commissioned to paint portraits of revered saints, which are still on display at two holy sites in Radha Kund, India.

In the late 1980s Aileen began the Miracle Flowers of Life series, which she sold through the Atlantic Art Gallery in Cape Town, funding her travels and house construction in Vrindavan. Despite the challenges of living in Vrindavan, she continued creating and sending these paintings back to South Africa. In 1994, during her final months, despite declining health, Aileen continued to create art, and her vibrant flower paintings from that time reflect her ongoing commitment to her craft.
