= Sethembile Msezane =

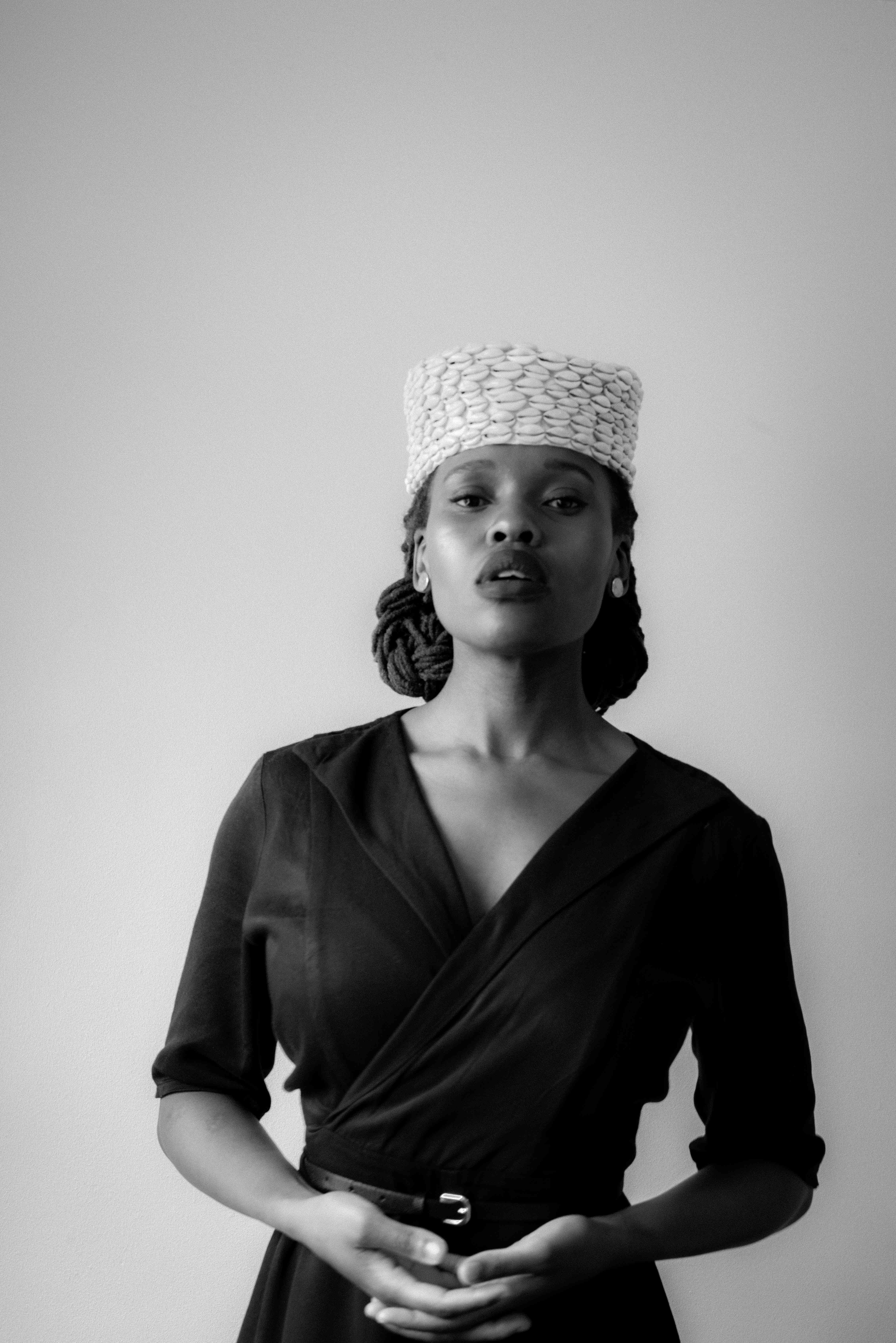
The artist Sethembile Msezane

Sethembile Msezane (born 1991 in KwaZulu-Natal) is a South African visual artist, public speaker and performer who is known for her work within fine arts. Msezane uses her interdisciplinary practice which combines photography, film, sculpture, and drawing to explore issues focused on spirituality, politics and African knowledge systems. Part of her works focus has been on the process of myth-making and its influence on constructing history as well the absence of the black female body in both narrative and physical spaces of historical commemoration. Msezanes work is held in galleries in South Africa as well as internationally and has won awards and nominations. Msezane is a member of the iQhiya Collective, a network of black women artists originating from Cape Town, Johannesburg and across South Africa.

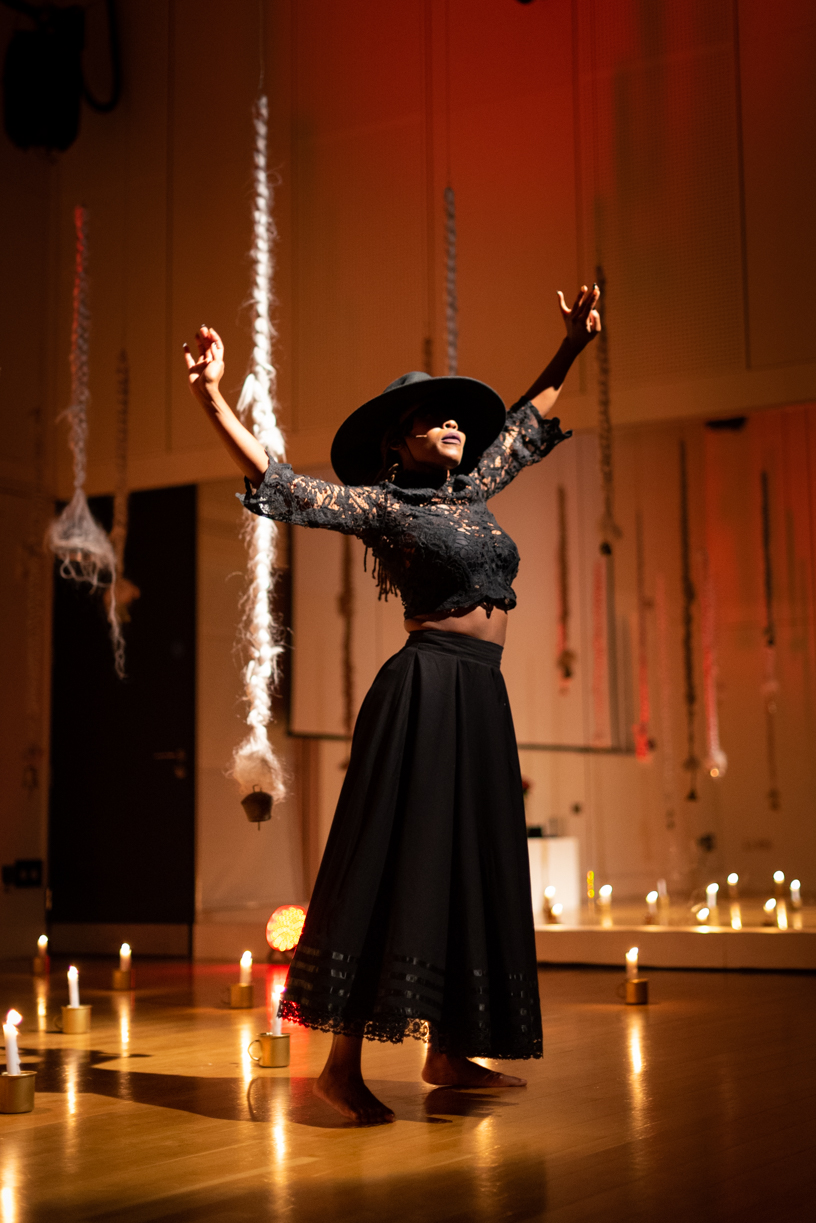
Sethembile Msezane, Signal Her Return III, 2019. In collaboration with Tyburn Gallery. Photo by Tom Morley, courtesy New Art Exchange

== Education & Career ==
Although born in Kawazulu-Natal, Msezane was raised in Johannesburg. She later moved to Cape Town, where she attended the Michaelis School of Fine Art to study for a BA in Fine Arts in 2012 and then her Masters of Fine Arts in 2017. Msezanes performances centre on the absence of black women in political and historical landscapes in South Africa. Through her performances she explores the ways in which women are restricted by society in their movement, clothing and figures by using her own body as a human sculpture, dressed in symbolic costume to affirm her importance, existence and role in public spaces.

Msezanes work has been widely recognised globally and features in galleries across South Africa including the Iziko South African National Gallery, Zeitz Mocca and the University of South Africa. In 2016 Msezane was the first person to receive the Rising Light Award during the Mboko awards ceremony for her work. She additionally received a TAF and SYLT Emerging Artist Residency (TASA) award the same year and was a Barclays L'atelier top ten finalist. Msezane was also nominated for an ANTI Festival International Prize for Live Art in 2017.

Her work, "Chapungu-the Day Rhodes Fell" (2015) was performed during protests of The Rhodes Must Fall Movement, whilst the John Cecil Rhode Statue at the University of Cape Town was being removed. Msezane stood as a human statue during the event for hours in a performance to reclaim the space. Msezane has used various other South African Public Holidays to perform and address issues that effect youth of today, as part of her "Public Holiday series 2014-2015" Some of Msezane's other performances include "Kwasuka Zukela" (2017) Gallery MoMo, Cape Town, South Africa, "All Thing being Equal" Zeitz Mocca (2017)Cape Town, South Africa and "Unframed"(2018) at the Cape Town Art Fair. Msezane exhibited her first UK solo performance "Speaking through the wall" at the Tyburn Gallery, London (2019), as well as showcasing her newest performance "Signal her return III" at the New Art Exchange in Nottingham, UK.

Msezane has alo performed in group shows some of which include "Women's Work and the art of Disruptions"(2016) at the Iziko South African National Gallery, "Re[as]sisting narratives(2016) at the Framer Frame in Amsterdam, "Dancing on a Volcano"(2018) at the Lagos Photo festival Nigeria, "Translations" at Emergence Art Space and Reed College (2015) Portland, Oregon, "Made Visible: Contemporary South African Fashion and Identity" (2019) at the Museum of Fine Art, Boston, USA.

Msezane appeared on TedGobal as a public speaker in 2017.

== Exhibitions ==
"Speaking Through the Wall" (2019) Tyburn Gallery. London, UK

"Kwasuka Sukela" (2017) Gallery Momo. Cape Town, South Africa

"All Things Being Equal" (2017) Zeitz Mocca. Cape Town, South Africa

"Unframed" (2018) Cape Town Art Fair. Cape Town, South Africa.

"Umoya: a Quiet revolution" FNB Joburg Art Fair. Johannesburg, South Africa

"Re(as)sisting Narratives" (2016) Framer Framed, Amsterdam, the Netherlands

== Awards ==
- Okay Africa 100 Women 2018 Honoree
- Mbokodo Awards, first receiver of the Rising Light Award 2016
