= Asemahle Ntlonti =

South African artist

Asemahle Ntlonti (born 1993) is a contemporary South African artist living and working in Cape Town. She is best known for her political work that deals with her experience as a black female growing up in South Africa.

== Early life and education ==
Asemahle Ntlonti was born in Cape Town, South Africa in 1993. She graduated from The University of Cape Town's Michaelis School of Fine Art with a Bachelor of Fine Arts in 2017, where she majored in sculpture.

== Work ==
Asemahle's recent work has dealt with the trauma of the frequent death and violence inflicted on black bodies. She is a member of iQhiya Collective which is made up of 11 black women based in Cape Town, Johannesburg, South Africa and Botswana. iQhiya participed in Documenta 14 (2017) and has exhibited in various spaces.

She was awarded Hoosein Mohamed Award for excellence is 2015 and the Barbaro Fairhead award for social responsibility in 2014. Ntlonti was top ten finalist for Barclays L’Atelier in 2016 and participated in Infecting The city.

Ntlonti had her first solo show, Kukho Isililo Somntu at Blank Projects in 2017. The exhibition aimed to discuss the experience of black pain; "loss of lives, disintegrating memory, loss of land, humanity, time and love. "

Asemahle continues to live and work in Cape Town, South Africa

== Awards and Residencies ==
- Hooseid Mohamed Award (2015)
- Finalist for Barclays L’Atelier (2016)
