= ANTI – Contemporary Art Festival =

Art festival held in Kuopio, Finland

Coordinates: 62°53′34.05″N 27°40′45.10″E

ANTI - Contemporary Art Festival -logo.

ANTI – Contemporary Art Festival is an art festival that presents site-specific contemporary art which covers all artistic forms from sculpture and environmental art to dance, live art and performance. The annual festival is held in Kuopio, Finland. The first ANTI Festival was first organized in 2002 by The Arts Council of Northern Savonia. The ANTI – Contemporary Art Festival Association was established in 2005 to coordinate the festival.

Over the years, ANTI has become Finland's leading presenter of live art, as it promotes innovative developments in sonic and visual arts. Artworks featured in the festival are presented in multiple different locations depending on the theme and nature.

The name "ANTI" means "gift" in Finnish, which reflects the festival's policy to make art accessible to all, artworks that are presented in the festival are free of charge, allowing people who may not typically engage with art to become accidental participants and viewers, which leads to most audiences often experience the disruptive potential of the works profoundly.

In 2007, Artistic Director Erkki Soininen was replaced by Gregg Whelan, who was appointed as Co-Artistic Director of ANTI. Whelan also works as a performance-maker, writer and co-artistic director of Lone Twin and Lone Twin Theatre.

In 2013, ANTI – Contemporary Art Festival launched the ANTI Festival International Prize for Live Art, an international art award with a prize of 30,000 Euros. The Live Art Prize has been awarded since 2014, recognizing outstanding contributions to the field of live art.

== Live Art Prize recipients ==
In 2014, the ANTI festival established an International Live Art prize of 30,000 Euros.

- 2014: Cassils
- 2015: Willoh S. Weiland
- 2016: Terike Haapoja with shortlisted artists: Action Hero, My Barbarian and Public Movement
- 2017: Tania El Khoury with shortlisted artists: Sethembile Msezane, Alexandra Pirici, and the Vacuum Cleaner
- 2018: Sonya Lindfors with shortlisted artists: All The Queens Men (Australia), Nic Green (United Kingdom), Jeanne van Heeswijk (Netherlands) by a jury chaired by Jacques Rancière
- 2019: Dana Michel (Canada) with shortlisted artists: Cuqui Jerez (Spain), Keijaun Thomas (USA) and Mammalian Diving Reflex (Canada)
- 2020: Brian Fuata (Australia) with shortlisted artists: Geumhyung Jeong (South Korea), W A U H A U S (Finland), Ingri Fiksdal (Norway)
- 2021: Alex Baczynski-Jenkins (Poland/UK) with shortlisted artists: keyon gaskin (US), Florentina Holzinger (Austria), Narcissister (US)
- 2022: Latai Taumoepeau (Australia/Tonga) with shortlisted artists: Liz Rosenfeld (US/ Germany), River Lin (Taiwan), Zinzi Minott (UK)
- 2023: Tiziano Cruz (Argentina) with shortlisted artists: Autumn Knight (United States), Jota Mombaça (Brazil) and Joshua Serafin (Philippines/Belgium)

== Themes ==
2003

Over the years, the festival had explored various themes. Works were presented in unconventional spaces such as a hair salon, a gas station, and a nursing home. Main artists of the festival was butch artist Saga Kobayashi from Japan and Live Art artists Eve Dent and Kira O'Reilly from England.

2004

The international program included artists from many countries such as Great Britain, Canada, United States of America, Germany, Japan and Netherlands. In four days, there were 17 performances. One of them was Will Kwan's (CA) performative lecture in University of Kuopio which was mentioned in media as well as Jennifer Nelson's (US) and Glen Redpath's (CA) work Prisma Relay, which was held in local supermarket.

2005

The theme of the 2005 edition was the time. The theme was defined by Charles Landry, who said that ”It is important that a city does not wipe out its memory”.

2006

There were 17 artists from all over the world giving their performances in Kuopio City Hall, Väinölänniemi Tennis Court, Youth Center 44, Hotel Puijonsarvi, Huuhanmäki Observatory, Cinema Maxim, an empty property on Tasavallankatu, balcony of the Carlson department store, Kuopio airport, Savonia University of Applied Sciences, Health Professions Kuopio, an apartment mediated by the real estate agency Huoneistokeskus and the office of Reijo Kela.

2007

For the 2007 edition of the festival a community college, a skateboarding park, the pages of a city newspaper, a late-night grill, a children's playground and an entire island were negotiated by an international program of artists. The most popular work of the year was the vacuum cleaner's One Hundred Thousand Pieces of Possibility, where the artist gave away 1000 euros in 1 cent pieces. Claire Blundell Jones's work Introducing Tumbleweed to the Finnish Landscape, was noticed by media press.

2008

For the 2008 edition Kuopio's residents opened their homes to audiences and host works made for domestic space. Other projects took place in a sports stadium, on a public stage, across the network of city streets and on, and under, the Rönö bridge.

2009

The theme of the ANTI Festival was walking. Vincent Chevalier (CA) traveled from one place to another while walking along a 2-metre length of red carpet. Tim Knowles (UK), set off walking while being guided by the wind, and he created a wind vane mounted to a helmet.

2010

This edition of ANTI concentrated on how artists working with writing and language navigate, read and inhabit the city.

2011

2011 was year of celebration since it was 10th ANTI Festival. There were pieces presented by artists from Great Britain, United States, Canada, Belgium and France. In the program there was multiple different works, such as Blast Theory's Rider Spoke, which was a work for cyclists who explored the city by bike while searching for places to hide recorded messages and found digital treasures others have hidden. The choir was conducted by Heidi Fast, and a balloon piece was made by Gaëtan Rusquet. The festival culminated with Mammalian Diving Reflex's "The Children's Choice Awards".

2012

This year the ANTI Festival program worked on the themes of masculine relationship, along with nature and the connection between sexuality and the body as well as the natural state of the human body. For the 11th time, The festival took over public spaces in Kuopio, the Luonnon ANTI program set up a camp on the island of Karhusaari. And a weekend-long artwork and workshop program were organised.

2013

During its twelfth year, the ANTI Festival offered encounters in Kuopio and Northern Savonia. During its twelfth year, the international festival of contemporary art spread to other locations, such as Lapinlahti, Hietasalo island and the smoke sauna in Rauhalahti. In Cruising for Art about 20 Finnish and international artists made over 800 1-to-1 performances around Kuopio. Also the first PechaKucha night in Kuopio was organized during the festival.

2014

Children and teenagers were in the focus of this year's ANTI Festival. The youngest family members nearing adulthood were either the theme or an active part of the production. This year the first ever ANTI Festival International Prize for Live Art was awarded. Winner of the first prize was Canadian artist Heather Cassils.

2015

ANTI was running in cooperation with the Kuopio Marathon. The festival started to no longer be an annual event due to the new artistic concept, but it was organised with different partners to coincide with non-artistic events. The themes were much broader and were featuring endurance, fitness, sports and training.
