= Melanie Keen =

British arts professional

Melanie Keen CBE is an arts professional. She was director of Iniva (Institute of International Visual Art) from 2015 to 2019 and the Wellcome Collection from 2019 to 2026.

Keen has worked to promote artists of the Black Arts Movement in the UK.

== Early life and education ==
Keen was born in 1967 and grew up in the East End of London, her parents of Afro-Caribbean background. She studied at East Ham College of Technology in the 1980s, where she took inspiration from Sonia Boyce to pursue study of fine art. Later she achieved an MA in curating at the Royal College of Art (RCA).

== Career ==
Keen worked as an independent curator and consultant, supporting events and exhibitions such as the Frieze Art Fair and the Venice Biennale, also at Chelsea College of Art as a research assistant, and at Arts Council England. She joined Iniva as an assistant curator, eventually becoming Director a role she held from 2015 to 2019. She was appointed Director of the Wellcome Collection in June 2019, a post she remained in for seven years. She also sits on the advisory board of the Government Art Collection.

Keen has been a trustee of the Raven Row art exhibition centre since 2021. She has been the subject of artwork itself, sitting for Dutch photographer Carla van de Puttelaar.

In July 2022, Keen was awarded an honorary doctorate by the University of the Arts London.

== Bibliography ==
- Recordings: A Select Bibliography of Contemporary African, Afro-Caribbean and Asian British Art
- out of this world: digital technology
