= Bronwyn Katz =

South African sculptor and visual artist

Bronwyn Katz (born 1993) is a South African sculptor and visual artist. She is a founding member of iQhiya Collective, a network of young black womxn artists based in Cape Town and Johannesburg, South Africa.

== Early years and education ==
Katz was born in 1993 in Kimberley, South Africa. She attended the University of Cape Town, South Africa and graduated in 2015 with a BFA. She was awarded with the Simon Gerson Prize at the University of Cape Town.

== Career ==
Katz's works incorporates sculpture, installation, video and performance. Using the concept of land as a repository of memory, Her works reflect the notion of place or space as lived experience and hence the ability of the land to remember and communicate the memory of its occupation. In 2016, her solo exhibition titled Groenpunt was held at Blank Projects in Cape Town.

== Exhibitions ==
Katz has held five solo exhibitions and participated in several group exhibitions including;

- The 12th Dak’Art Biennale in Senegal (2016)
- Le jour qui vient – Galerie des Galeries in Paris (2017)
- Tell Freedom – Kunsthal KAdE in Amersvoort (2018)
- Sculpture – Institute of Contemporary Art Indian Ocean, Port Louis in Mauritius (2018)
- A Silent Line, Lives Here at the Palais de Tokyo in Paris (2018)
- Salvaged Letter at Peres Projects in Berlin (2019)
- Blank Projects in Cape Town (2019)
- Là où les eaux se mêlent (Where the water mingles) (Biennale de Lyon, Lyon, 2019)
- The Empathy Lab (Jessica Silverman Gallery, San Francisco, 2019)
- Material Insanity – Museum of African Contemporary Art Al Maaden in Marrakech (2019)
- Road to the Unconscious – Peres Projects in Berlin (2019)

== Residencies ==
- 2018 – SAM Art Projects residency, Paris
- 2018 – CBK Zuidoost residency, Amersfoort
- 2018 NIROX Sculpture Park residency

== Awards ==
- 2015 – She received the Simon Gershwin Prize at University of Cape Town
- 2019 – She won the FNB Art Prize

== Personal life ==
Katz lives and works in Johannesburg.
