= Latai Taumoepeau =

Australian contemporary artist (born 1972)

- Born: 1972 (age 53–54)
- Known for: Performance Art
- Movement: Contemporary

Latai Taumoepeau (born 1972) is an Australian contemporary artist. She is best known for her performance art, which explores the politics of race, colour and power in Australia. She has shown her works in leading Sydney galleries and venues including the Museum of Contemporary Art Australia, Carriageworks, Performance Space, the Sydney Opera House, Campbelltown Arts Centre, Casula Powerhouse Arts Centre, and the Australian Museum.

== Early life and education ==
Latai Taumoepeau was born in the Eora Nation, Sydney, Australia, where she currently lives and works. Taumoepeau is described as a punake, which is a Tongan term that refers to "performance artists, such as dancers, who use the body as their medium". The term punake is used to describe "artists who compose poetry and songs and choreograph them for performance. The word comes from puna (to fly) and hake (on high)."

== Career ==
Taumoepeau draws inspiration for her artwork from her Tongan heritage and seeks to address issues surrounding race, class and the female body politic.

Taumoepeau presented at a symposium at Melbourne's Contemporary Pacific Arts Festival which "celebrate[s] the creative practices among the Pacific diaspora in Australia".

Her artwork Dark Continent, 2018, was presented as a part of the 9th Asia Pacific Triennial of Contemporary Art (APT9) at Queensland Art Gallery | Gallery of Modern Art, in Brisbane. Dark Continent was also performed for the program duration of the 48HR Incident, a performance art and live action event which occurred over 48 hours from 29 to 31 May 2016.

In 2018, her performance piece Repatriate was also exhibited alongside Museum of Water as a part of the 2018 Perth Festival at the Fremantle Arts Centre. Repatriate sought to draw attention to the impact of rising sea levels on Pacific Island nations, including her motherland of the Kingdom of Tonga.

Taumoepeau was part of the Sydney Biennale in 2020, presenting her work The Last Resort, a major installation on Cockatoo Island.

In 2020 & 2021, Taumoepeau designed the programme for REFUGE at Arts House, a programme of talks, live artworks and installations that prepares communities for the coming climate emergency, connecting contemporary politics, environmental scientists and indigenous knowledge holders to enable interconnected conversations for the survival of all beings.

== Work ==
=== Awards and nominations ===
- 2015: Best Artist, FBi Sydney Music, Arts & Culture (SMAC) Awards.
