= Ambra Gambale =

South African-Italian artist and jewelry designer

- Born: Ambra Gambale
- Known for: Conceptual art, Sculpture, Jewellery
- Notable work: Silvered Crocodile Skull
- Movement: Metamodernism, Magic Realism, Surrealism
- Website: www.ambrajewellery.com

Ambra Gambale is a South African and Italian artist and fine jewellery designer. Her Skullchemy range of memento mori artworks created from exotic animal skulls, metals & precious stones have been exhibited and sold in London, Notting Hill & Dover Street, Mayfair. Her fine jewellery range is handmade and centred on the use of gold, ebony and diamonds. Her collectors include Pulitzer Prize winner Lauren Beukes.

Her Silvered Crocodile Skull art piece is a crocodile skull in platinum and diamonds that was featured in Casa Vogue of Brazil, valued at £1,000,000. While merchandised pieces of the skull along with her jewelry have been sold at Wolf & Badger in Mayfair and Merchants on Long, Cape Town.

== Life and career ==
=== Early life ===
Born in South Africa of mixed Sicilian and Venetian ancestry. Ambra went on to study design at Central Saint Martins and the Inchbald School of Design in London before setting up her own jewellery brand.

=== Career ===
Ambra Gambale established Ambra Fine Jewellery in 2010, making use of fine diamonds and precious metals such as gold and platinum. Her works are designed for the high-end luxury market, but also have a playful and girly charm.

By 2013, her jewellery had been sold and listed next to the likes of Anoushka Ducas & Theo Fennel and stocked internationally in London, UK, and Cape Town, South Africa. Her 2013 collection "Diamond Dreaming" included bracelets, necklaces and pendants inspired by the Islamic Hamsa motif as well as keys, crowns and peace signs in 9ct and 18ct white, yellow and rose gold.

Her range of Skullchmey exotic animal skulls of crocodile, baboon, caracul are dipped in liquid precious metals in a technique she has developed herself. Her metal embalming process leaves the exotic animal skulls in an antiqued patina finish that is already being copied by others. Ambra's Skullchemy range is inspired by surreal influences of skeletal carcasses she had seen on South African roads, juxtaposed with her desire to add hope and light to this scene of death.

Her works have been exhibited and listed on international media such as Casa Vogue of Brazil, Top Billing TV show in South Africa, British GQ & Grazia Magazine.

== Artwork ==
Her works include:

- Slivered Crocodile Skull, an exotic crocodile skull in precious metal and stones.
