= Terike Haapoja =

Terike Haapoja (born 1974) is a Finnish interdisciplinary visual artist, who works mainly with video and video installation. She's currently based in Berlin. Haapoja's work has been shown in solo and group exhibitions and festivals nationally and internationally.

Haapoja’s work investigates the existential and political boundaries of the world, exploring things like nature, death and other species, addressing especially the anthropocentric world view of Western traditions. She questions how different structures of exclusion and discrimination function as foundations for identity and culture.

In 2013, Haapoja represented Finland in the 55. Venice Biennale with a solo exhibition Closed Circuit – Open Duration in the Nordic Pavilion. She gained international recognition from her work, Museum of Nonhumanity (2016), that was created alongside Finnish author Laura Gustafsson. Museum of Nonhumanity has been exhibited in Taipei Biennale (2019), Santarcangelo Festival (2017) and Momentum Biennial (2017), and as part of the summer exhibition Animals and Us at Turner Contemporary, Margate. In 2016, Haapoja and Gustafsson were awarded with the Finnish State Media Art Award for the project. In 2020, Haapoja started an art and research project [Against] Animal Capitalism. In 2026, she curated a conference about her research for the National Museum of Contemporary Art Athens EMST.

Terike Haapoja’s work has been exhibited, among others, in Medina Triennial, Borås Biennale, Helsinki Biennale, Kalmar Art Museum, Kindl Berlin, Kiasma Museum of Contemporary Art and Chronus Art Center in Shanghai.

Haapoja has co-edited several publications including Bud Book –Manual for Earthly Living, The Helsinki Effect – Public Alternatives to Guggenheim’s Model of Culture-Driven Development, Altern Ecologies – Emergent Perspectives on the Ecological Threshold in the 55. Venice Biennale.

Haapoja has also been awarded Dukaatti prize (2008), the Säde prize (2009) and a honorary mention for artist of the year in 2007 at Finland’s Festival. In 2016, Haapoja won the ANTI Festival International Prize for Live Art. In 2022 Haapoja was awarded Guggenheim fellowship.

Haapoja has an MA degree from the Finnish Academy of Fine Arts and Theatre Academy.

Haapoja was a member of the board of trustees of Kone Foundation 2016–2018 and a member of the board of trustees of the Finnish Cultural Institute in New York in 2019–2022. She was also a founding member and a chair of Checkpoint Helsinki, a Helsinki-based art organisation now under the name PUBLICS.

== Personal life ==
Haapoja is of Hungarian descent through her father.
