= Thelma Van Rensburg =

South African artist

Thelma van Rensburg
- Born: 15 April 1969 (age 56); Pretoria, South Africa
- Education: Post graduate
- Known for: Photomanipulation, ink and pencil
- Movement: Feminism
- Website: Official website

Thelma van Rensburg (born 15 April 1969) is a South African artist. Her work explores female sexuality and how women are represented in the mass media concerning beauty or ugliness, issues of otherness and the Gaze. Her art making process is adventurous - ranging from mixed media, painting and drawing to digital work. She has been a participant in competitions such as Sasol New Signatures competition 2007 in Pretoria, Ekurhuleni competition in 2009 and Vuleka competition in 2009 in Cape Town and Art Lovers competition in Pretoria in 2014 and 2015 and was a finalist in all of these competitions.

== Education ==
Thelma van Rensburg was born in Pretoria, South Africa in 1969. She studied, traveled extensively and attended Hoerskool Tegnies Witbank where she joined the Drama team. In 2000 she acquired her BA degree in Psychology at the University of South Africa and in 2007, she acquired her B-Tech Honours Degree in Fine Art from the Tshwane University of Technology. She completed a master's degree in Fine Arts at the University of Pretoria University in 2016. She is currently enrolled as a PhD student in Practice Based Research at The University of Plymouth in the United Kingdom.

== Work ==
Throughout her work, van Rensburg aims to portray the masks that women use in order to be accepted by the contemporary society. These masks become an alternative "skin’, distorting one's identity". In 2013 she started working with the female form as abject and grotesque to subvert fetishized representations of women in fashion photography. This interest progressed in her Masters research when she came upon a proliferation of fashion spreads that depicted women in passive states, such as dead or dying as pioneered by the French fashion photographer, Guy Bourdin. Her dissertation offers a feminist critique of the representation of women in the media and the partially biased construction of femininity. The focus is on the representation of women in contemporary fashion photography and visual texts, and specifically the way in which a link is constructed between femininity and death.

== Exhibitions ==
Since 2008, van Rensburg has participated in several group exhibitions, including at the Fried Contemporary Gallery in Pretoria; Maggie gallery in Centurion; the Gallery at Duncan Yard Pretoria; and the MAP Gallery in Graskop. In 2009, she took part in a group exhibition at Deluxeville Gallery in Woodstock; the Rust-en-Vrede Gallery in Durbanville; in the Affordable Art Fair at Fried Contemporary Gallery in Pretoria; St Lorient Fashion and Art Gallery in Pretoria; Aardklop Arts Festival in Potchefstroom. She also had a solo exhibition at the Kunsthaus in Cape Town in September 2009, and she was a finalist in the Ekurhuleni Fine Arts Awards as well as in the Vuleka Sanlam competition in Cape Town the same year. In 2010, her work was showcased at The Gallery at Duncan Yard on many occasions; the Articles and Frames in Pretoria; at the Artcafe@thehub in Centurion; the Gallery 18th Avenue in Pretoria and at the Artspace Warehouse in Johannesburg.

== Examples of work ==
=== Unfinished Grotesque: September 2011 ===
This work critiques the 'master' painter's gaze on the female form. The term 'master' was applied throughout the history of painting to an elite group of supposed male genii. These collages use images from these 'master' paintings to literally create grotesque female bodies of fetishized body parts. The use of the grotesque signifies the transgressing of boundaries, in which this transgression is a critical feature of the ‘grotesques' relationship with both the beautiful and the sublime. In aesthetic discourse, clear and discreet boundaries are integral to the apprehension of beauty. The grotesque is a 'body in the act of becoming... never finished, never completed; it is continually built, created, and builds and creates another body. The work is thus a transgression of the patriarchal gaze and empowers woman's self portraiture.

=== Existential Angst ===
Occasionally, late at night, while trying to sleep and failing, people experience an anxiety of existence, they are aware of their entire body, the entire world, and the whole of reality itself. It's like waking from a dream, or a light going on, or a giant "You are here" sign appearing in the sky. The mere fact that I'm actually real and actually breathing suddenly hits me in the head with a thwack. It leaves me giddy. It causes a brief surge of clammy, bubbling anxiety, like the opening stages of a panic attack. The moment soon passes, but while it lasts it's strangely terrifying.

=== The Masquerade ===
The concept of masquerade can be analyzed as an extension of identity, as opposed to the Oxford English dictionary that does not make much distinction between mask, disguise and masquerade in intention or definition. The mask is seen as partial covering; and disguise is full covering. Masquerade in the other hand is explained as deliberate covering. The mask hints; disguise erases from view, and the masquerade overstates. The mask constitutes than an accessory; disguise is a portrait and masquerade is a caricature. Indeed, even in the dictionary definitions, the word 'disguise' appears in all three. Therefore, the words mentioned above: masquerade, mask and disguise share similarities that become obvious 'through dialectic of concealing and revealing'. Masquerade calls attention to such fundamental issues as the nature of identity, the truth of identity, the stability of identity categories and the relationship between supposed identity and its outward manifestations (or essence and appearance). The paradox 'appears to be that it presents truth in the shape of deception, and reveals in the process of concealing'.
