= Marie-Ann Yemsi =

German-Cameroonian curator (born 1963)

- Alma mater: Sciences Po; Paris 1 Panthéon-Sorbonne University
- Occupation: Art curator

Marie-Ann Yemsi (born 1963) is a German-Cameroonian curator, known for her efforts to promote African artists internationally.

== Biography ==
Yemsi was born in Germany in 1963, to a German mother and Cameroonian father. As a child, her family moved frequently throughout Europe and Africa, and her father faced death threats for his political activity as a dissident in Cameroon. She studied at Sciences Po, then obtained a master's in sociology of international relations from University of Paris 1 Pantheon-Sorbonne.

In 2005, she founded a consulting firm focused on cultural production, Agent Créatif(s). Then, in 2015, she drew notice for her work curating the exhibit Odyssées Africaines / African Odysseys at the Forest Cultural Center in Belgium. In the exhibit, she examined the resurgence of history in the contemporary work of 17 artists from such countries as South Africa, Botswana, the Democratic Republic of the Congo, and Mozambique.

In 2017, Yemsi worked as a curator on several international expositions, including the Art Paris art fair at the Grand Palais and Africa Now, an art event in Paris supported by the Galeries Lafayette. She also organized that year the exhibit Le jour qui vient at the Galerie des Galeries, and served as curator of the 11th edition of the African Photography Encounters in Bamako, Mali.

Yemsi describes herself as a "courier" allowing African artists to gain visibility internationally. She has particularly focused on the work of women artists in Africa.
