= Carolyn Parton =

South African artist

- Born: 1964 (age 61–62); Cape Town
- Known for: Painting
- Website: Carolyn Parton

Carolyn Parton (born 1964) is a South African artist living and working in Cape Town.

Parton is particularly interested in the impact of artists and their art making on the environment. Many of her works are made using spent and discarded paint tubes from other artists, which are then recycled into new images. Parton's work addresses both the waste generated in traditional painting and the environmental impact of the paint itself. The weight of reclaimed paint used in a piece determines the piece's title.

== Career ==
- Enviroserv Waste Art winner (2008)
- Spier Contemporary (2010)

== Awards ==
- 2010: Spier Contemporary finalist
- 2008: Enviroserv Waste Art winner
- 2006: University of South Africa Award for top Art student

== Exhibitions ==
- 2010: Spier Contemporary, Cape Town City Hall.
- 2007: Solo exhibition, Release, X-Cape, Hippocampus, Cape Town.
- 2004/2006: University of South Africa student group exhibitions, ArtB Gallery, Bellville.
