= Theo Fennell =

British jewellery designer

- Born: Alister Theodore Fennell; 8 August 1951 (age 74); Egypt
- Occupations: Jewellery and silverware designer
- Spouse: Louise MacGregor
- Children: 2, including Emerald
- Website: theofennell.com

Alister Theodore Fennell (born 8 August 1951) is an English jewellery and silverware designer. He is nicknamed the "King of Bling" due to his flamboyant designs for celebrity clients. In 1982, he opened his eponymous jewellery business. In 2009, he returned to the company after 18 months away, and regained control of the company in 2021.

== Early life and education ==
Alister Theodore Fennell was born to English parents in Egypt on 8 August 1951.

He was educated at Eton College, York College of Art, and the Byam Shaw School of Art.

== Career ==
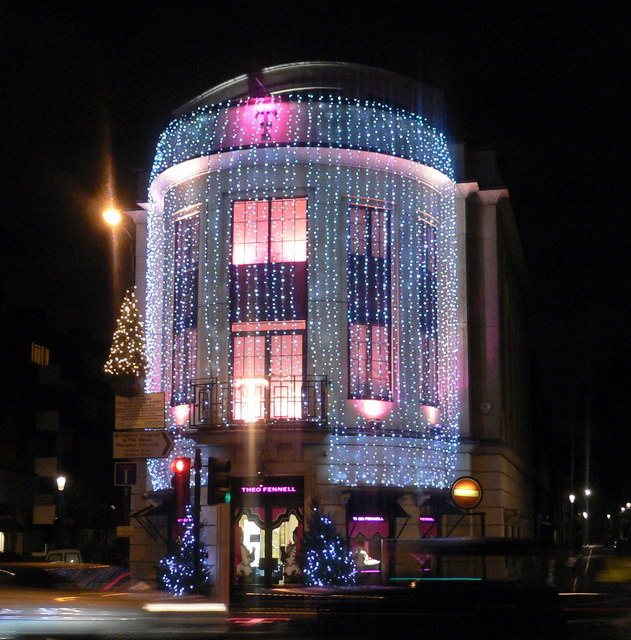
Theo Fennell on Fulham Road

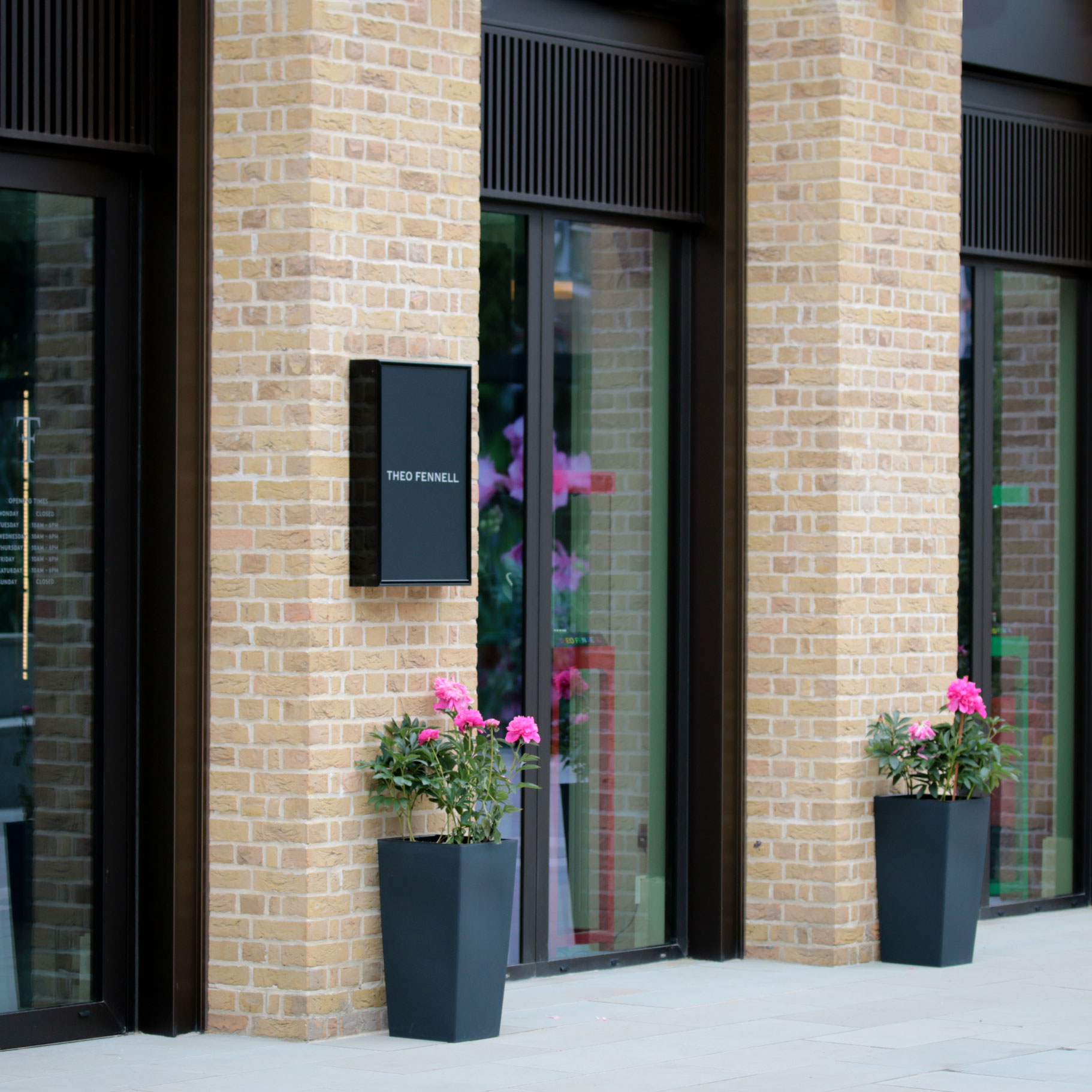
Theo Fennell in Chelsea Barracks

Fennell's first job was as an apprentice and designer at Edward Barnard, a long-established silversmiths in Hatton Garden. Following his apprenticeship, he started his first jewellery business in 1974. In 1982, he opened the first Theo Fennell shop at 177 Fulham Road in Chelsea, a location he chose to be closer to his clients. In 1997, he moved his flagship store into the building he helped design at 169 Fulham Road.

In 2007, Fennell held the exhibition Show Off! at London's Royal Academy of Art, consisting of an array of installations, dioramas, paintings, presentations, and sculptures, each showcasing a piece of his jewellery.

In 2008, Fennell founded The Original Design Partnership, a design consultancy specialising in jewellery, silver, and curios while also working in other design fields, including mentoring young British designers through his Gilded Youth initiative.

By 2011, Fennell had expanded from jewellery into items such as silver photo frames, cocktail shakers, and jugs, with more products in design. In 2011, bespoke items such as the Secret Garden ring with yellow gold, paraiba tourmaline, diamond, and enamel were listed at £40,000 or more.

In May 2022, after 25 years at 169 Fulham Road, Fennell announced that he would move his shop to Chelsea Barracks as the rent had become "ludicrous".

Fennell's clients have included Joan Collins, Lady Gaga, Elizabeth Hurley, Elton John, and Madonna.

== Honours ==
Fennell is a Fellow of the Institute of Professional Goldsmiths (IPG) and an ambassador for The Goldsmiths' Craft and Design Council. He is a liveryman of the Goldsmiths Company, and an honorary fellow of the University of the Arts London.

== Personal life ==
Fennell is married to author Louise MacGregor, with whom he lives in London. They have two daughters: actress and filmmaker Emerald and fashion designer Coco.

Fennell published his memoir, I Fear for This Boy: Some Chapters of Accidents, in 2022.
