= Chrysoula Argyros =

South African artist

- Born: 9 March 1954 (age 72); Lemnos, Greece
- Citizenship: South African
- Education: General Smuts High School in Vereeniging
- Occupation: Painter Miniaturist
- Known for: Watercolour and oil artworks of Greek landscapes, buildings and portraits

Chrysoula Argyros (born 19 March 1954, Greek: Χρησούλα Αργυρού) is a South African painter and miniaturist known for her watercolour and oil artworks, often depicting Greek landscapes, historic buildings, and figures

== History ==
Born on the Greek island of Lemnos, she immigrated to South Africa in 1956 and completed her schooling at General Smuts High School in Vereeniging, where she studied art. She began painting seriously in 1982 under the guidance of Sheila Santilhano, later continuing with Hazel Thompson from 1998.

Chrysoula joined the Watercolour Society of South Africa in 1991, earning Associateship in 1993 and Higher Associateship in 2005, and has received numerous awards from the society. In 1994, she was commissioned to create a painting for former President F.W. de Klerk. She became a member of the Miniature Art Society of South Africa in 1992, where she won multiple awards, and in 2006 was invited to join the Miniature Painters, Sculptors & Gravers Society as an Associate Member—an honor granted exclusively through peer vote. In 2007, she was elected a Signature Member of the Miniature Artists of America, a society established to recognize outstanding practitioners in the field of miniaturism, selected from among consistent award winners in major exhibitions. Her international recognition expanded further with election as an Associate Member of the Hilliard Society (UK) in 2012 and the Royal Miniature Society (UK) in 2013.

Independent media coverage has profiled her work and exhibitions. In 2019, the Bedfordview Edenvale News reported on a watercolour painting demonstration she hosted for community members and the Paint and Palette Group. The Insider SA published an article featuring her alongside Karyn Wiggill Bell, highlighting their miniature artworks.

Chrysoula has exhibited internationally, with works accepted into exhibitions by the Royal Miniature Society and the Hilliard Society. Her paintings have been offered at auctions, and she has been featured in the Watercolor Art Southern Africa online gallery

== Awards and Achievements ==
Miniature Art Society of South Africa - highly commended awards for

- 1998 At the Exhibition in Knysna
- 1998 At the NBS-House and Garden Show in Durban
- 2001 “Quiet Corner”
- 2002 “Balcony in Tuscany”
- 2003 “Exchange Views”
- 2004 “Sitting Pretty”
- 2005 “Summer Colours”
- 2006 “Tide”
- 2006 “Old Cypriot Woman”
- 2007 “Monk from Mount Athos”
- 2008 “Monk from Ayion-Oros”
- 2009 “Yia-Sou, Cheers”
- 2010 “Villager”
- 2011 “Burning the Candle”
- 2012 “Village Priest” 2013 “Broken Shutter”
- 2013 First Place for Stamp challenge - “Old Greek Villager”
- 2014 Best in Portrait category "Old Greek Monk"
- 2015 "Old Greek Priest"
- 2016 "Catch of the Day"
- 2017 "Boat in Lemnos"
- 2018 First Place "Colourful Geraniums”
- 2019 First Place "Enfield Busker"
- 2021 First Place "The Busker”
- 2022 First Place "In the Distance"
- 2023 First Place "Autumn Glow"
- 2024 First Place "Retief Pools"

Watercolour Society of South Africa - highly commended awards for

- 1991 Three works accepted for the exhibition in Hong Kong
- 1994 “Old Peasant” (49th Open)
- 1994 “MacCauvlei” (49th Open)
- 1998 “Kotsina-Limnos” (59th Open)
- 1999 “Blue Window” (62nd Open)
- 2001 “La Ramblas” (63rd Open)
- 2002 “Paul” (67th Open)
- 2002 “Woman in Black” (68th Open)
- 2004 Grand Prix Exhibition was awarded First and Second Place
- 2005 “Old Athenian” (73rd Open)
- 2005 “The Monk” (74th Open)
- 2007 “Gavito” (78th Open)
- 2009 “Potted Geraniums” (82nd Open)
- 2009 “The Visitor” (82nd Open)
- 2010 “The Villager” (84th Open)
- 2013 “Old Greek Fisherman” (89th Open)

International Watercolour Society of South Africa

- 2018 First Place for painting 'Old Greek Monk’
- 2018 Honourable Mention for painting 'in the Balance’
- 2018 Third Place for painting 'London Street Artist’
- 2018 Honourable Mention for painting 'Old Greek Priest’
- 2019 Best in Show for 'London Street Artist'

Brush & Chisel Society

- 1992 W H Coetzer Award - Best Painting
- 1996 W H Coetzer Award - Highest Points
- 2004 Award for Highest Points scored - Watercolour
- 2004 Award for Highest Points scored - Overall

Miniature Art Society of Florida

- 2002 Honourable Mention for “Yia-Yias’ Pretty Pots”
- 2003 First Place for “Villager from Rhodes”
- 2004 Third Place for “All in a Row”
- 2006 Third Place for “Waiting”
- 2008 Honourable Mention for “Entangled Creeper”
- 2009 Honourable Mention for “Outside Looking In”
- 2010 Second Place for “Potted Geraniums” (Botanical and Floral)
- 2011 First Place for “Neighbours” (Transparent Watercolours)
- 2012 Second Place for “Village Garden” (Transparent Watercolours)
- 2013 Second Place for “Green Shutters” (Exterior)
- 2016 First Place for "In the Balance" - Floral/Botanical category
- 2017 First Place for "Sorting Herbs" - International category
- 2018 Honorable Mention for "Village Garden" - Oil painting category
- 2019 First Place for "Colourful Geraniums" - Floral/Botanical
- 2020 "SYLVIA TRUNDLE AWARD" Best in Watercolour for "Resting"
- 2021 Second Place for "Roped In” - Floral/Botanical category
- 2022First Place for "Village Summer Garden" - Floral/Botanical category
- 2023 Second Place for "Evening Glow” - Transparent Watercolours
- 2024 Honourable Mention for "Eleni's Yard” - Transparent Watercolour

Miniature Painters, Sculptors and Gravers Society

- 2009 First Place for “At the End of a Day” (International)
- 2010 Second Place for “The Villager” (Portrait)
- 2011 First Place for “Old Greek Monk” (Portrait)
- 2012 Second Place “Sorting Herbs” (International)
- 2012 Third Place for “Old Greek Fisherman” (Portrait)
- 2013 Third Place for "Old Greek Fisherman" - Portrait category
- 2014 JANE H. STEEL Memorial Award for "Rusty Tins and Geraniums" Best in Floral
- 2015 Third Place for "Music in Beijing" - International category
- 2016 Second Place for "Potted Garden" - Floral/Botanical
- 2017 Second Place for "Old Brown Door"- International category
- 2018 Honourable Mention for "Old Blue Gate" - International category
- 2019 Second Place for "Tranquil Forest" - Landscape category
- 2020 Third Place for "Trees at Dimalachite" - Landscape category
- 2022 Third Place for "Colourful Borough Market" - Watercolour category
- 2023 Second Place for "Green Gate with Wisteria" - Watercolour category

Miniatures in Mariposa (Sierra Artists Gallery - USA)

- 2006 Peoples Choice - First Place for “Old Cypriot Woman”
- 2006 Honourable Mention for “The Tailor”
- 2007 Second Place for “Tshabalala” (Portrait)
- 2007 Second Place for “Colourburst” (Floral)
- 2007 Honourable Mention for “Green Gate”
- 2008 Second Place for “At the End of a Day” (Portrait)
- 2011 First Place for “Vanishing Traditions” (Portrait)
- 2011 Third Place for “Greek Priest” (Portrait)
- 2012 First Place for “Old Greek Villager” (Portrait)
- 2012 Third Place for “Creative Monk” (Portrait)
- 2013 First Place for “Old Greek Fisherman” (Portrait)
- 2013 Honourable Mention for a portrait
- 2014 First Place for "Broken gate" (Landscape)
- 2014 Second Place for "Solitude" (Portrait)
- 2015 First Place for "Old Greek Priest" - Portrait
- 2015 Third Place for "Old Man from Santorini" - Portrait
- 2016 Second Place for "Old Greek Monk" - Portrait
- 2016 Third Place for "Palace Garden" - Landscape
- 2017 BEST IN SHOW for "Old Himba Man" - Portrait
- 2019 BEST IN SHOW for "London Street Artist" - Portrait
- 2019 First Place for "Tranquil Forest" - Landscape
- 2019 Second Place for "Rusty Tins and Geraniums" - Floral
- 2020 First Place for "Pedro" - Portrait
- 2020 First Place for "Still Waters" - Landscape
- 2020 Honourable Mention for "Sitting Pretty" - Floral
- 2024 Second Place for "Cuban Woman" - Portrait

Vereeniging Art Society

- 1988 Best Watercolour on Show
- 1988 Best Building or Street Scene
- 1989 Best Watercolour on Show
- 1989 Best Building or Street Scene
- 1989 Best Oil Landscape
- 1989 Best Oil on Show
- 1990 Best Watercolour Landscape
- 1990 Best Portrait
- 1990 Best Building or Street Scene
- 1990 Best Watercolour on Show
- 1991 Best Oil Landscape
- 1991 Best Portrait
- 1991 Best Building or Street Scene
- 1991 Best Interior
- 1991 Best Still Life
- 1991 Best in Open Category
- 1991 Best Oil on Show
- 1991 Best Watercolour on Show
- 1992 Best Miniature on Show
- 1992 Best Oil Flowers
- 1992 Best Oil Landscape
- 1992 Best Still Life
- 1992 Best Portrait

Other Awards, Achievements and Commissions

- Commissioned to do a painting for the former President of South Africa, President F W De Klerk, which was presented to him in January 1994
- Commissioned to do 6 paintings for a calendar by a publisher in 1994 and 1998
- Commissioned to do paintings for the Bank of Athens in Johannesburg in 1999
- Commissioned to do 8 portraits of past Archbishops and Patriarchs of the Greek Orthodox Church of Africa.
- Received “Merit Award” at the 39th Annual Lake Oswega Festival of Arts in 2002
- Received “Excellence Award” in the Field of Art from The Lyceum Club of Greek Woman in 2005
- Received “Higher Associateship” from the Watercolour Society of South Africa

Work was accepted for the World Federation of Miniatures at the

- First World Miniature Art Exhibition in the UK in 1996
- Second World Miniature Art Exhibition in Tasmania in 2000
- Third World Miniature Art Exhibition in Washington, USA in 2004
- Fourth World Miniature Art Exhibition in Tasmania in 2007. Received “Highly Commended” for Best Portrait on Show in "Any Medium"
- Fifth World Miniature Art Exhibition in Moscow, Russia in 2004
- Awarded "Signature Member" at The Miniature Artists of America
- Awarded “Signature Membership” by the Hilliard Society of Miniatures in the UK in 2012
- Elected “Associate Member” of the Royal Miniature Society in the UK in 2013
- Deputy President of South Africa, Kgalema Mohlanthe, awarded a painting, which he was a guest of honour, to celebrate Advocate George Bizos’ 85th Birthday
- Included in the book MODERN MASTERS OF MINIATURE ART in America', published in 2011 and in the Book 'WHO'S WHO IN ART in the UK (36th Edition)
- Awarded Signature Membership by the Hilliard Society of Miniatures in UK in 2012 (HS)
- Elected Associate Member of the ROYAL MINIATURE ART SOCIETY 2013 (ARMS)
- Awarded FULL MEMBERSHIP to the ROYAL MINIATURE ART SOCIETY in 2017 (RMS)

INTERNATIONAL EXHIBITIONS other than Miniature Art

2021

- IWS GLOBE Watercolour Day', Honourable Mention for painting, 'Old Athenian' Tehran, Iran - 'Peace and Friendship Through Watercolor' Exhibition painting 'Old Athenian' selected
- IWS NEPAL, 'Truly Watercolor' Exhibition, painting 'The News Reader' selected
- IWS CALIFORNIA Brushstrokes of Harmony Exhibition, painting London Street Artist' selected
- IWS SINGAPORE, painting 'On a Cold Winter's Day' selected
- IWS HONDURAS, Cafe gallery, Coffee Painting Contest, painting 'Old Athenian' voted in the Top 40
- IWS ARGENTINA, painting 'Messa Potamos' selected
- WASA 'Out of Africa' Exhibition, Resting in Tranquility' received Highly Commended Award
- IWS KOSOVO, Coffee Painting Contest, at IWSBX Gallery, 'Village Shopkeeper' selected
- IWS TEHRAN, at Mah Art Gallery, painting 'Old Villager from Lemnos' selected
- MINI WATERCOLOR Exhibition in Kyiv, Ukraine, painting 'Valencia Spain' selected
- WASA International Watermedia Competition, awarded Honorable Mention for 'The News Reader' and 'Neo Classic Building-Crete’

2022

- RAJA RAVI VARMA, India, International Exhibition, received GOLD AWARD for painting 'Sorting Herbs'
- PERU, International Coffee Painting Competition, received 1st Honorable Award for painting 'Tranquility' SA Artists Magazine Competition, received Third Place in Landscape category for 'Autumn Glow'
- WASA Watercolor Competition, received Honorable Mention for painting 'Gavito'
- IWS AZERBAIJAN, 'Love and Peace Online Exhibition' received Second Place for "Tranquility'
- IWS SANTIAGO Watercolor Exhibition, painting 'Peratologio' selected
- IWS GREECE, 'Memories Unite Us' Exhibition, awarded the 'Atlantis Award" for 'Market Day in Konos'
- DRAWING GUILD OF SA, Degrees of Realism Exhibition awarded BEST IN SHOW for graphite drawing of 'Pedro'
- TEHRAN, Hope of Freedom, Coffee painting Exhibition, painting 'The Fisherman' selected in the Top 20
- IWS FRANCE Auarelle Pvreneene, ‘Restina in Tranauilitv' selected

2023

- BRISHA VANU Art Competition, Bengal, India, awarded GOLD for two paintings
- IWS GEORGIA, painting 'Pedro' selected for exhibition in Tbilisi, Georgia
- IWS AZERBAIJAN and IWS MEXICO, painting 'At the Kafenio' selected
- IWS GREECE, painting Market Day In Mykonos' selected for Global Watercolor Day exhibition at Chalkos Gallery, Thessaloniki, Greece
- IWS IRAN ‘To Be a Woman' exhibition, painting The Goat Herder' selected
- FabrianolnAquarelle Exhibition, Italy, painting 'Catch of the Day' selected.
- PersertWer Society, Little Gems Online Exhibition for Pink Roses', awarded Fourth Place for 'Geraniums'
- IWS CANADA Stories in Light exhibition, painting 'Evening Glow' selected
- IWS SURINAME, painting ‘Evening Glow' selected in the Top 10
- Published in The Watercolorist Magazine WASA
- Awarded the Primeart/Fabriano Award for 'All Tied Up’.
- Awarded BRONZE for 'Bluebell Forest' and Highly Commended for 'Green Gate with Wisteria' in Cheryl's International Watercolor Society Exhibition
