= Lungiswa Gqunta =

South African sculptor and visual artist

Lungiswa Gqunta (born 1990) is a South African sculptor and visual artist. Her work has been shown in several galleries and exhibitions including Zeitz Museum of Contemporary Art Africa, Johannesburg Art Gallery, Kunsthal Zurich and Nelson Mandela Metropolitan University, University of Cape Town.

== Early years and education ==
Gqunta was born in 1990 at Port Elizabeth, South Africa. She attended the Nelson Mandela Metropolitan University and graduated in 2012 with a bachelor's degree. In 2017, she received an MFA from the Michaelis School of Fine Arts in Cape Town.

== Career ==
Gqunta is a founding member of iQhiya Collective, a network of young black female artists based in Cape Town and Johannesburg, South Africa. Her work investigates colonial landscapes and the spatial legacies that result from them. She uses found materials including empty beer bottles, petrol, torn bed sheets and worn wooden bed frames to create designs that expresses different forms of violence and the systemic inequality in South Africa. She has shown her work with some galleries in South Africa including Zeitz Museum of Contemporary Art Africa and the Johannesburg Art Gallery (JAG).

== Exhibitions ==
She has exhibited her work both locally and internationally. Some of the solo and group exhibitions she has participated in include:

- Qokobe (2016)
- Whatiftheworld Gallery, Cape Town (2016)
- Manifesta 12 biennial, Palermo, Sicily, Italy
- Istanbul Biennial (2017)
- Not a Single Story II at the Wanas Konst Museum in Sweden
- Stranger's Location at the Michaelis Galleries (2017)
- Young Now at Hazard Gallery (2017)
- Everyday Anomaly at Whatiftheworld Gallery (2017)
- Qwitha (2018)

== Residencies ==
- Rijksakademie van beeldende kunsten in Amsterdam
- Grassworks

== Personal life ==
Gqunta lives and works in Cape Town.
