= Robyn Nesbitt =

South African artist (born 1984)

- Born: 1984 (age 41–42); Johannesburg
- Awards: Spier Contemporary, 2007
- Website: www.robynnesbitt.com

Robyn Nesbitt (born 1984) is a South African artist currently living and working in Johannesburg. Nesbitt attended Witwatersrand University, Johannesburg. In 2007 she was a recipient of the Spier Contemporary award. Nesbitt's work is distinguished by her meticulous observation of everyday events ranging from the ordinary routines of our life to the celestial routines that surround us. Humorous, poetic, and banal moments become stylized in mediums which include research, process, documentation, drawing, video, and photography. She often collaborates with Nina Barnett.
