= John Whibley Gallery =

Coordinates: 51°30′37.48″N 0°8′28.81″W

The John Whibley Gallery was an art gallery in London, England, at its peak in the 1960s and early 1970s. It was initially located at 60 George Street but was reported to have reopened in 1968 and thereafter was located at 22 Cork Street. It was still functioning in 1973. It attracted artists from as far afield as South Africa and Malaysia. The gallery closed in 1975.
