= Doreen Southwood =

- Born: 1974 (age 51–52); Cape Town
- Awards: 2003 Brett Kebble Art Award; 2001 ABSA L'Atelier

Doreen Southwood (born 1974) is a South African artist, designer, and boutique owner based in Cape Town. She works in a wide variety of media in her artwork, producing sculptures, objects, prints, film, and more, which she often bases on personal experiences and self exploration. Her candidness regarding personal flaws and the cycles of repression and coping that accompany conservative, middle class, Afrikaans upbringing inform much of her work, calling attention to ways in which women are silenced or otherwise repressed in that space.

In 2003, Southwood was named the overall winner of the Brett Kebble Art Awards for her painted bronze sculpture, "The Swimmer." The sculpture featured a young woman gazing blankly ahead as she stands on the end of a diving board. For this award, Southwood received R100,000, at that time the largest award for a single artwork in South African history.

Her work has been exhibited in Senegal, Cuba, New York City, and across South Africa.

In 2001 she opened a shop in Cape Town called Mememe, which seeks to make the work of African fashion designers available to the public. Another Mememe shop opened in Johannesburg in 2011. Southwood's own designs have been featured in fashion weeks in Johannesburg and Cape Town and are known for embodying features of the feminine and nostalgic.

== Career ==
=== Education ===
Southwood received her B.A. in Fine Arts from the University of Stellenbosch in 1998.

=== Exhibitions ===
2010

- CURRENT MATTERS, The Gallery, Grande Provence, Franshoek
- TWENTY, South African Sculpture of the last Two Decades, Nirox Sculpture Park, Cradlle of Humankind, Gauteng
- 1910-2010: From Pierneef to Gugulective, Iziko South African National Gallery, Cape Town

2009

- SING INTO MY MOUTH, What if the world, Cape Town
- Audi JO'BURG Fashion Week, Sandton Convention centre

2008

- ZA: GIOVANNE ARTE DEL SUDAFRICA, Palazzo delle Papesse, Siena, Italy
- VIRGIN MOBILE CAPE TOWN FASHION week, Cape Town

2007

- SUMMER 2007/08, Michael Stevenson Gallery, Cape Town
- SPIER CONTEMPORARY, Spier Estate, Stellenbosch

2006

- ALTERNATIVE CLOTHES workshop, Havanna Biennale, Cuba
- PERSONAL AFFECTS: Power and Poetics in South African Art, The Contemporary Museum, Honolulu
- WOMAN: Photography and New Media, Jo'burg

2005

- IN THE MAKING: materials and process, Michael Stevenson Gallery, Cape Town
- UNIVERSE OF ME, Michael Stevenson Gallery, Cape Town
- SYNERGY, Iziko National Gallery, Cape Town

2004

- DEMOCRACY AND CHANGE, Klein Karoo Nasionale Kunstefees, Oudshorn
- DAKART Biennial, Dakar, Senegal
- FORTY/VEERTIG, Sasol Museum Stellenbosch
- PERSONAL AFFECTS, Power and Poetics in Contemporary South African Art, Museum for African Art, New York City
- A DECADE OF DEMOCRACY: South African art 1994-2004 from the permanent collection, South African National Gallery, Cape Town

2003

- KAROO NASIONALE KUNSTEFEES, Untitled (solo exhibition)
- BRETT KEBELE ART AWARDS Finalists Exhibition, Cape Town

2002

- BELLVILLE ARTS ASSOCIATION, ABSA Atelier
- SELF, Klein Karoo Nasionale Kunstefess, Oudshorn
- JUST PERFECT, Spark Gallery, Jo'burg
- BELL ROBRTS GALLERY, Nothing really matters, Cape Town

== Bibliography ==
Perryer, Sophie (2004). 10 Years 100 Artists: Art In A Democratic South Africa. Cape Town: Struik. ISBN 1868729877. Archived from the original on 2 April 2015.
