= Liz Rosenfeld =

Liz Rosenfeld (born 1979) is an American performance, film/video and visual artist based in Berlin.

== Early life and education ==
Rosenfeld was born in 1979 in New York City to parents of Jewish descent. Rosenfeld received an MFA in 2005 from The School of the Art Institute of Chicago, followed by an MA in Performance Studies from New York University in 2007, where they worked with the late influential queer theorist José Esteban Muñoz as their thesis advisor.

== Work ==
Rosenfeld makes experimental film, performance, and visual artworks, addressing "questions and desires related to a queer corporal position". They are also a published writer of queer auto- theory and poetry. They were the first Goethe@LUX artist in residence with the Goethe-Institut London in 2017. Rosenfeld's films and performances have been shown internationally at museums and other venues.

In their practice, the artist "explores questions regarding the sustainability of emotional and political ecologies, past and future histories and the ways in which memory is queered." They explore cruising methodologies and take an approach to flesh as "a non-binary collaborative material" with a focus on "the potentiality of physical abundance and excess". Flesh, for them, is something that they "move with, live with, sculpt with ... something that [they're] collaborating with".

For Rosenfeld, the materiality of the body and the skin are akin to the texture of film and video, beyond simple metaphor, and the artist works with "moving images as performative bodies". The immersive environment of a planetarium, for which Rosenfeld made White Sands Crystal Foxes, merges their love for the cinematic and the performative.

In 2025 Rosenfeld published their first auto- theory book, co written with Professor João Florêncio titled Crossings: Creative Ecologies of Cruising. This was published by Rutgers University Press as part of their Q-Public book series. This book has been well received around the world, featured in the Los Angeles Review of Books and continues on a book tour in 2026.

Rosenfeld is also known for their 2003 experimental short film, (Untitled) Dyketactics Revisited, which is a re- interpretation of the late Barbara Hammer's seminal film, Dyketactics made in 1974. (Untitled) Dyketactics Revisited was Liz's MFA thesis at The School of the Art Institute of Chicago. After the making of "Untitled," Barbara and Rosenfeld formed a friendship, and who were often programmed in screenings, conversations and artists labs together until Barbara's passing. (Untitled) Dyketactics Revisited is still one of Rosenfeld's most screened films to date.

Rosenfeld has also worked with and performed in the work of artists Lilly Baldwin, Shu Lea Cheang, Marit Ostberg, Meg Stuart, Wu Tsang and others.

== Recognition ==
- 2022 – Rosenfeld's 360° film White Sands Crystal Foxes, conceived for a planetarium, was nominated for a Teddy Award for Best Short Film at the Berlinale
- 2022 – Shortlisted for the ANTI – Contemporary Art Festival Live Art Prize 2022
