= Diana Page =

South African painter and performance artist (born 1965)

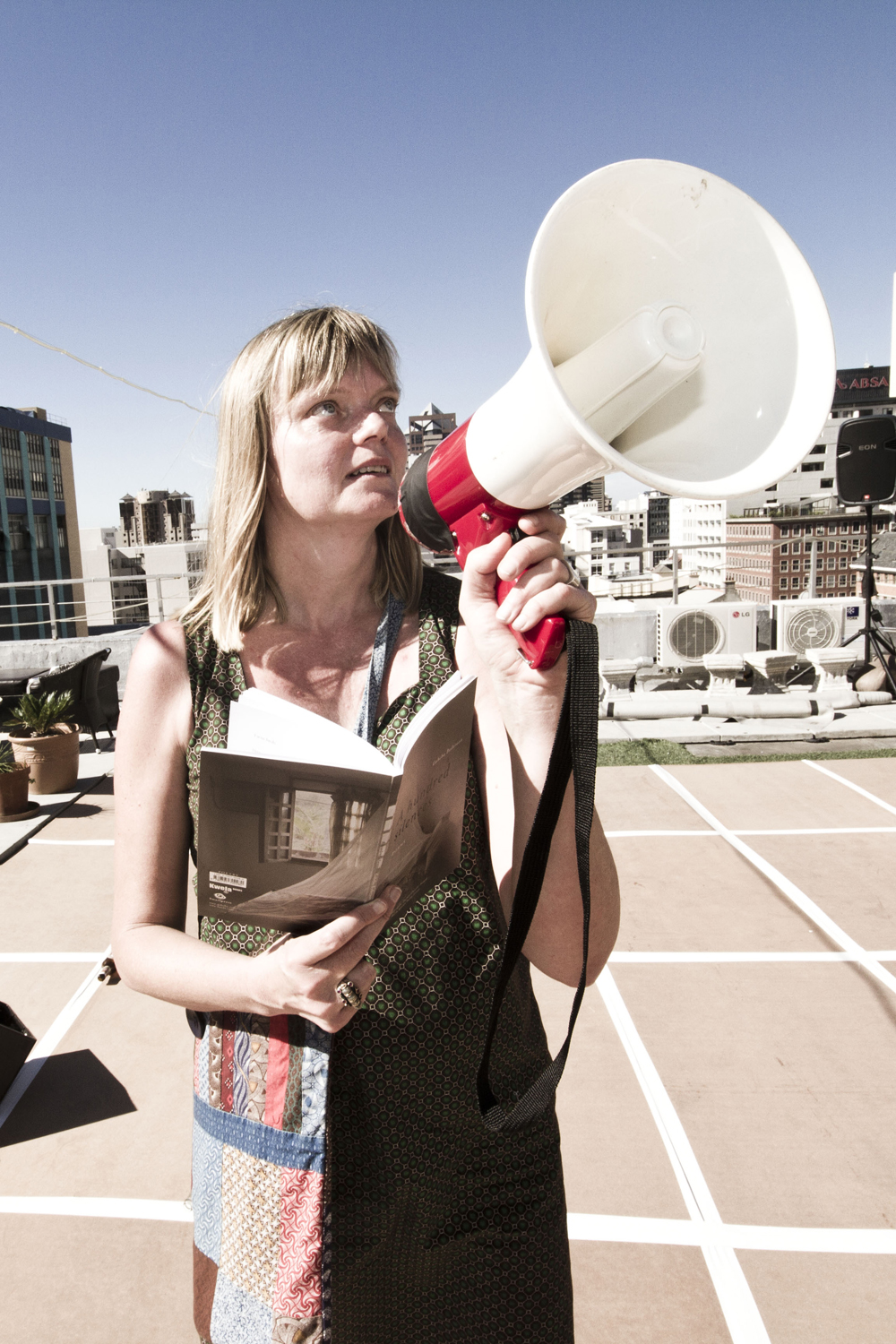
- Page on 8 March 2012
- Born: 1965 (age 60–61); Durban, South Africa
- Known for: Painting, Performance, Installation
- Website: www.dianapage.co.za

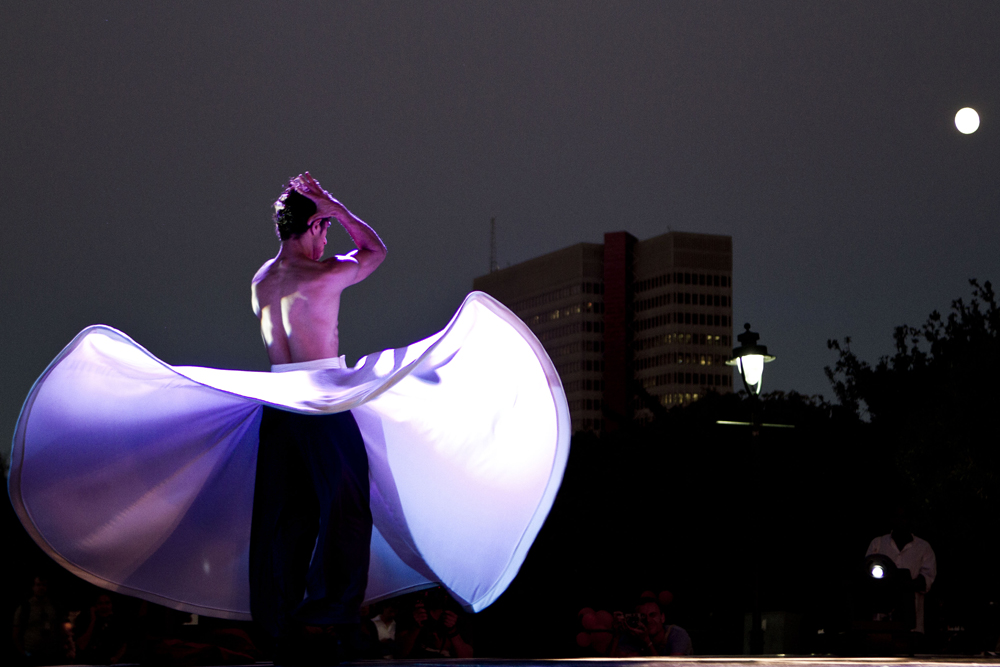
Infecting The City 2012, EkSe

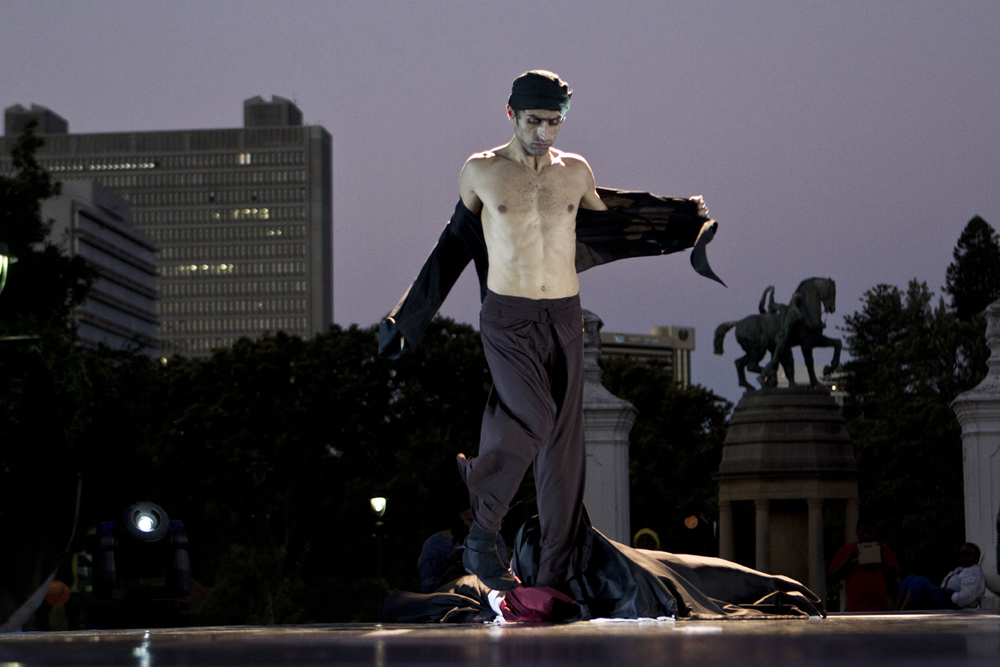
Infecting The City 2012, EkSe

Diana Page (born 1965) is a painter, performance and installation artist originally from South Africa but currently residing in Istanbul, Turkey. Exploring experiences of traveling back and forth between these two homes, Page's artwork concerns ideas of globalization and nomadic lifestyle. Through painting, drawing, performance, installation, and video, Page investigates the urban environments she inhabits as an emotional as well as physical setting.

== Career ==
In 2022, Page's solo exhibit, Walking on a rim of light, which including wall-based paintings and photographic and digital prints, was exhibited at the Oliewenhuis Art Museum (the Reservoir) from 24 February to 10 April 2022.

=== Education ===
Page has a BA Honours from University of Natal, 1986, a HDE from University of Cape Town, 1987, and a Master in Fine Arts from Rhodes University, 1992.

=== Exhibitions ===
- Infecting the City Public Art Festival, Cape Town, 2012
- Its Liquid:Liquid Cities and Invisible Identities 2012, Venice
- Between Colour and Line, Diana Page & Joicy Koothur 2012, Ouvroir d'Art, Istanbul
- Then Now Next Diana Page & Justin Eccles Ouvroir dArt, Beyoglu, Istanbul
- Ships & Dreams Arnavutkoy Art Gallery, Istanbul, 2010
- Produced a performance piece "Pitch Blue" in Redhook, Brooklyn (Axis Gallery), 2008
- Sound Installation "Kadinin Sesleri", Galata, Istanbul, 2007
- 360Istanbul, Beyoglu, Istanbul, 2007
- Unknown Cities, Buchanan Square, Woodstock, Cape Town, 2006
- Irma Stern, Diana Page & Jane Young, 2005
- Association of Visual Arts, Cape Town, 2003
- Karen McKerron Gallery, Johannesburg, 2001
- Feeling the spaces Chelsea Gallery Cape Town, 1996
- Pilgrims Chelsea Gallery Cape Town, 1995
- Going Home Market Galleries Johannesburg, 1993
- Going Home Grahamstown Arts Festival, 1992

== Photo gallery ==
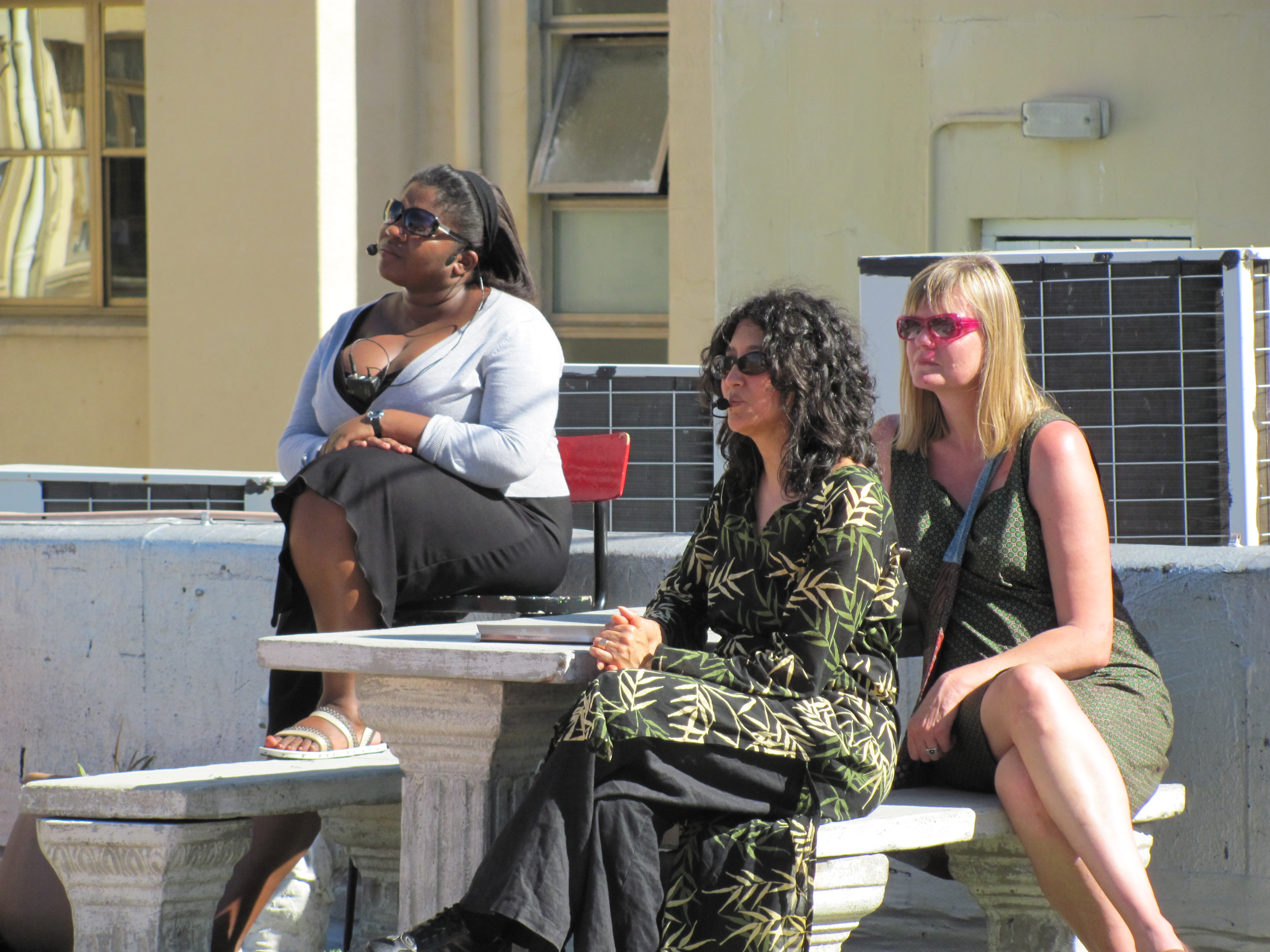

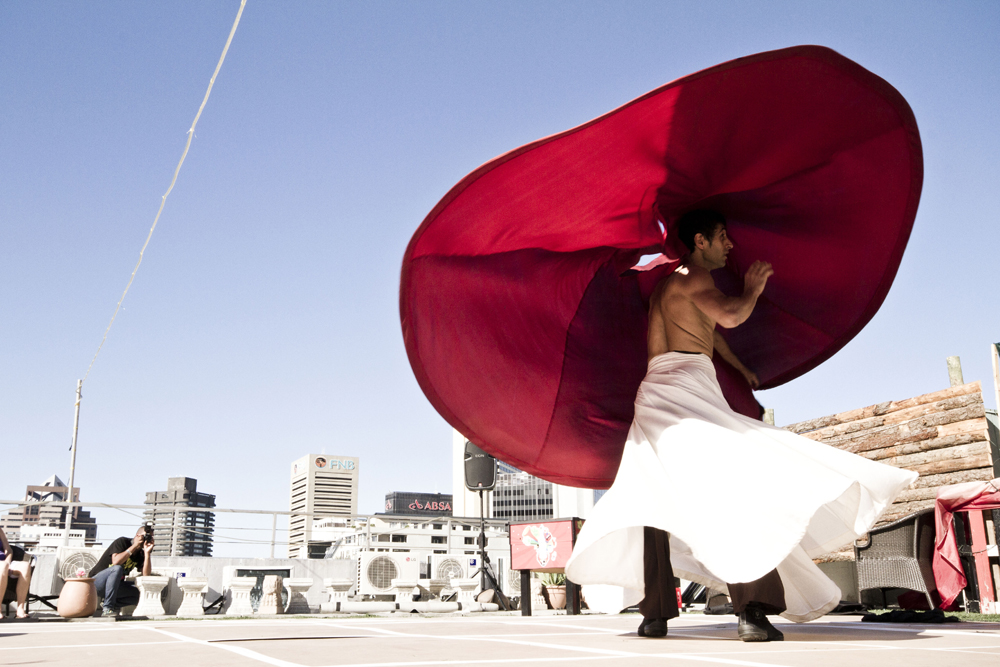
