= Buhlebezwe Siwani =

South African multidisciplinary artist

- Born: May 25, 1987 (age 39); Johannesburg
- Education: University of Cape Town
- Awards: Katrine Harries Print Cabinet Purchase Award (2015), Martienssen Prize Award (2010)
- Website: https://buhlebezwesiwani.com

Buhlebezwe Siwani (born in 1987 in Johannesburg) is a multidisciplinary artist known for her work in performance art, installations, and photographic stills.

== Biography ==
Buhlebezwe Siwani was raised in Johannesburg, and has lived in the Eastern Cape and KwaZulu Natal.

== Education and career ==
Siwani completed her BAFA (Hons) at the Wits School of Arts in Johannesburg in 2011 and her MFA at the Michaelis School of Fine Arts in 2015 where she graduated cum laude. Siwani works predominantly in the medium of performance and installations, and includes photographic stills and videos of some performances. Siwani uses videos and the stills as a stand in for her body which is physically absent from the space. Her work has been described as "revelatory" and "political", encompassing themes of black womanhood and spirituality.

== Exhibitions ==
- IYEZA, Standard Bank Gallery, Johannesburg (2023);
- Dedisa ubumnyama, Cairns Art Gallery, Cairns (2021);
- ukuqhaqha, Camera Work, Palazzo Rasponi, Ravenna (2021);
- The Power of My Hands. Africa(s): Women Artists – Musée d'Art Moderne de Paris, Paris, France (2021);
- Goddesses of Healing, Mbassy, Hamburg (2021);
- Casablanca Biennial, Casablanca (2021);
- Living, Forgiving, Remembering – Museum Arnhem, Arnhem, Netherlands (2020–2021);
- Witness: Afro Perspectives from the Jorge M. Pérez Collection – El Espacio 23, Miami, USA (2020–2021);
- Inkanyamba – Galeria Municipal de Almada, Almada (2020);
- 14th Curitiba Biennial, Curitiba (2020);
- Materiality, Iziko National Gallery, Cape Town (2020);
- Othunjiweyo – Galeria Madragoa, Lisbon (2019);
- Present Passing: South by Southeast, Osage Art Foundation, Hong Kong (2019);
- Bamako Encounters, Mali (2019);
- Ngoma: Art and Cosmology, Johannesburg Art Gallery, Johannesburg (2019);
- Cosmopolis #2: Rethinking the Human, Centre Pompidou, Paris (2019);
- The Third Bank, Bienal Ano Zero, Coimbra (2019);
- iNcence – No Man's Art Gallery, Netherlands (2018);
- Qab'Imbola – WHATIFTHEWORLD, Cape Town (2018);
- Tell Freedom, KaDE Museum, Amsefoort (2018);
- White blood blue night, Centre d'art contemporain d'Alfortville, Alfortville (2018);
- Imfazwe yenkaba, Galeria Madragoa, Lisbon (2017);
- Deep Memory, Kalmar Art Museum, Kalmar (2017);
- Art/Afrique, The Louis Vuitton Foundation, Paris (2017);
- Ingxowa yeGqwirhakazi – WHATIFTHEWORLD, Cape Town (2016);
- Imfihlo – Graduate Exhibition, Michaelis Galleries, Cape Town (2015).

== Residencies ==
- Het Vijfde Seizoen, Amersfoort (2017)
- Rote Fabrik, Pro Helvetia, Zurich, Switzerland (2016)
- Watch and talk, Theater Spektakel, Zurich, Switzerland (2015)
- Cite Des Arts, Paris (2020)

== Awards ==
- Standard Bank Young Artist Award for Visual Arts (2021)
- Prix Bisi Silva (2019)
- Katrine Harries Print Cabinet Purchase Award (2015)
- Martienssen Prize Award (2010)

== Personal life ==
Buhlebezwe lives and works between Amsterdam and Cape Town.
