= Arts House =

Arts centre in Melbourne, Australia

Coordinates: 37.803437°S 144.950073°E

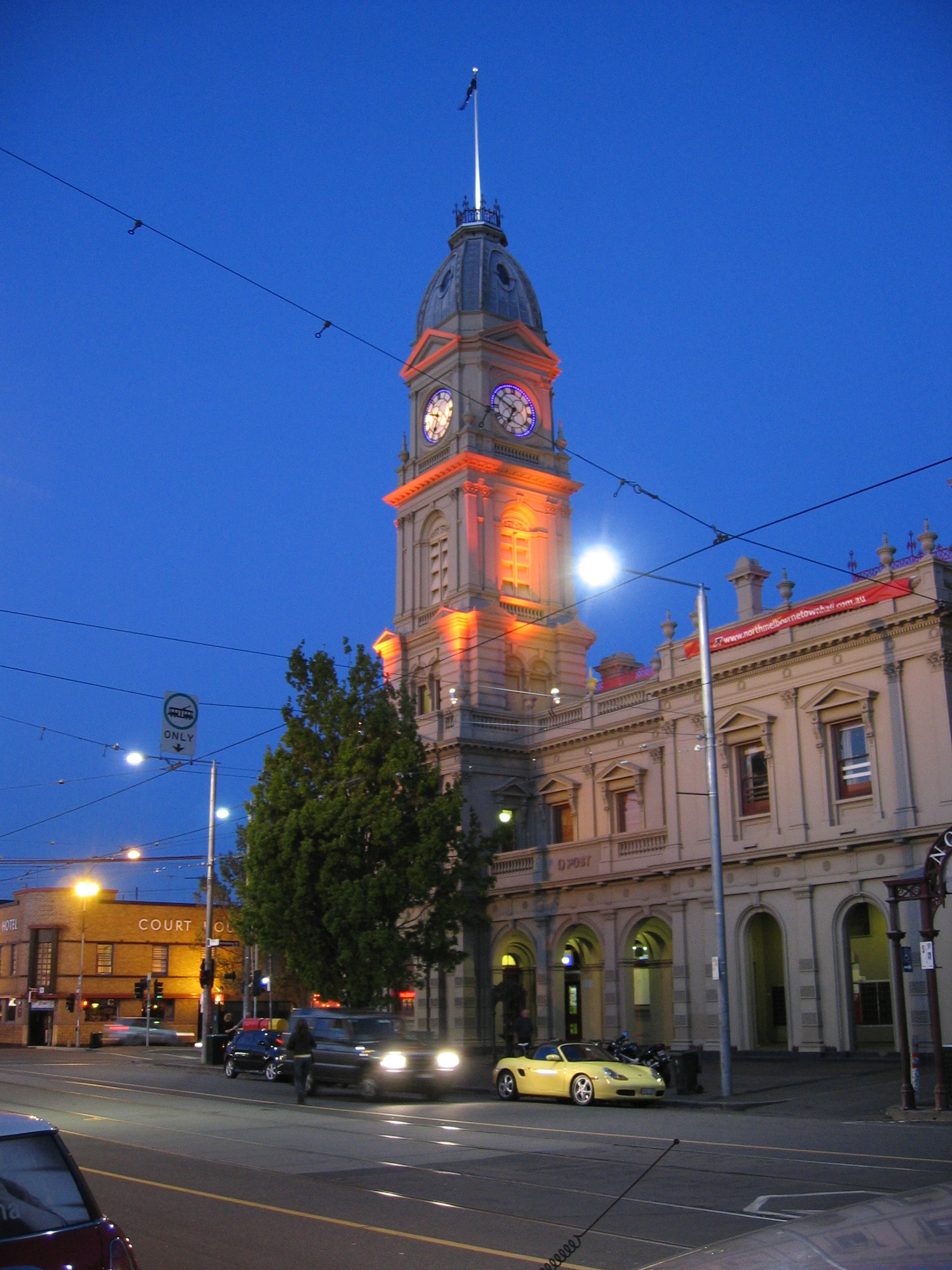
North Melbourne Town Hall

Arts House is a centre for contemporary performance and interactive artforms in Melbourne, Australia. Established in 2006, it is a program of the City of Melbourne.

It supports and presents a range of experimental theatre, live art, contemporary dance and similar types of performance, by Australian and international artists.

== Artistic Directors ==
Artistic directors of Arts House have included:

- Steven Richardson
- Angharad Wynne-Jones
- Josh Wright
- Emily Sexton
- Nithya Nagarajan
- Olivia Anderson
