= Mbokodo Award =

Awards for South African Women

The Mbokodo Awards are presented annually by Carol Bouwer Productions to honor South African women who have made contributions to the arts and culture. First awarded in 2012, they are given in multiple categories including literature, visual arts, film, theater, and music.
