= Lippy Lipshitz =

South African sculptor and painter

- Born: Israel-Isaac Lipshitz; 8 May 1903; Plungė, Russian Empire
- Died: 17 May 1980 (aged 77); Kiryat Tiv'on, Israel
- Known for: Sculpting, printmaking
- Notable work: Jacob Wrestling with the Angel (1946); Moses Striking the Rock (1961); Portrait of Margaret (1956)
- Awards: Medal for Sculpture (June 1964); Suid-Afrikaanse Akademie vir Wetenskap en Kuns

Israel-Isaac Lipshitz (8 May 1903 – 17 May 1980) was a South African sculptor, painter and printmaker. He is considered to be one of the most important South African sculptors, along with Moses Kottler and Anton van Wouw.

== Russia 1903 – 1908 ==
Israel-Isaac Lipshitz was born on 8 May 1903 as the second son of Shlomeh Josef Lipshitz of Dvinsk and Chayah Meray Faktor of Plungė, Lithuania. His paternal grandparents were of the Jewish Chassidic sect, while his maternal grandparents were of the Misnaged sect in February 1904, Israel's father set out for Cape Town in search of better prospects than were available to him in Plungė. He left his wife and the infant with the maternal grandfather Yankeh Fivah Faktor for the next four-and-a-half years. In his care the young Israel was taught to draw, carve wood and model in dough and candle grease. His grandfather had built the synagogue in Plungian, and it was in the decorative art of the synagogue that Israel first felt the impetus to artistic expression.

== Cape Town 1908 – 1928 ==
In 1908, Israel and his mother travelled to the port of Bremen, from where they arrived in Cape Town on 30 April 1908. In 1909, Israel started attending kindergarten classes at the Constitution Street Public School, where he received drawing instruction by the painter Ruth Prowse, and from 1911 to 1914 attended the Public Schools in Constitution and De Villiers Streets. From 1915 to 1917 he studied at Hope Mill School and matriculated in 1920 from the Normal College in Buitenkant Street. After school he pursued and abandoned a briefly held ambition to become a writer and enrolled, in April 1922, at the Cape Town Art School in Stal Plein.

The Cape Town Art School was run by Mr. P. Thatcher and Mr. C. S. Groves, who imposed a tradition of British academic discipline. Lipshitz developed friendships with painter Russel Harvey and sculptor Moses Kottler. Through Kottler, who had studied at the Bezalel Art School in Jerusalem and in Germany, before settling in Cape Town in 1915, Lipshitz made contact with modern art.

In 1925 Lipshitz met the Russian Jewish sculptor Herbert Vladimir Meyerowitz, who arrived from Berlin and was appointed lecturer at Michaelis School of Fine Art. They became friends and Meyerowitz invited him to be his assistant as Michaelis. Lipshitz derived considerable benefit from this relationship as he learned from Meyerowitz's skill in woodcarving. He also received an introduction to West African sculpture from Meyerowitz, who lent him a copy of Carl Einstein's Negerplastik (1915), an art-historical piece on primitivism.

At the end of 1926 a disagreement led to a parting of ways between Meyerowitz and Lipshitz. Isaac took up a studio with Russel Harvey in the Wasserfall and Hardick building in Church Street among painters George Crosland Robinson and Constance Penstone and sculptor Thackeray Edwards.

Towards the end of 1928, Lipshitz decided to further his education in Paris. He married Rachil Sief on 8 May 1928 and soon after made his departure for the City of Lights thanks to a grant from Ernest Oppenheimer.

== Paris 1928 – 1932 ==
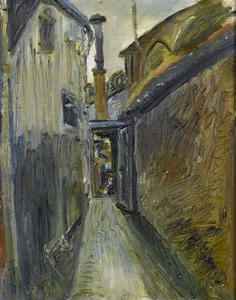
Montparnasse (1931), oil on canvas, 41 x 33 cm

Lipshitz took up residence in Montparnasse, Paris. He enrolled in the Académie de la Grande Chaumière where he studied under Antoine Bourdelle, onetime assistant to Rodin. In Paris he was initiated in the Modern Movement. Here he came into contact with the concepts of Cubism, Futurism, Expressionism, Dadaism, Surrealism and Constructivism.

In May 1929, with Rachel Lipshitz pregnant with their first child, he was forced to turn professional sculptor and abandon the Académie. He rented a studio in the rue Bardinet and some work was soon accepted for the Salon d'Automne of 1929, marking the beginning of his professional career. Also in 1929 he was able to visit first the studio of Ossip Zadkine, then Constantin Brâncuși. His friend Nesto Jacometti also introduced him to the work of a circle of Jewish artists within the École de Paris who would influence Lipshitz greatly: Chaïm Soutine, Jules Pascin, Moise Kisling and Amedeo Modigliani.

When Rachil Lipshitz returned to Cape Town in February 1930, Isaac remained in Paris for another two years, producing the body of work eventually shown at his first one-man exhibition in Cape Town in 1932. During these last two years he lived the life of a Bohemian, frequenting the Café de la Rotonde and the Dôme and gate crashing the annual Beaux Arts Ball. It was during this time he took up the soubriquet Lippy to distinguish himself from Cubist sculptor Jacques Lipchitz.

== Cape Town 1932 – 1947 ==
He returned to Cape Town in March 1932, settling in Barnett Street near the Company's Garden. He installed his studio in Castle Street, with painter Christopher Williams and set about organising his first solo exhibition of sculptures and drawings, which was to take place at the Martin Melck House on 16 May 1932. He found vociferous opposition to the Modern Movement and critics, like Bernard Lewis writing for The Cape, dismissive of all that it produced.

Lippy's exhibitions at Asbey's Galleries in 1934 and 1937 was subjected to a renewed assault by Lewis, but defended by younger critics, such as German sculptor René Graetz. Other artists such as Maggie Laubser, who had returned from Berlin strongly influenced by the German Expressionism, was similarly assaulted. That young artists felt compelled to defend Lippy's work was a first sign that they were organising themselves in opposition to establishment figures like Edward Roworth, then president of the South African Society of Arts. In 1936, the painter Gregoire Boonzaier returned from studies in London and felt compelled to take this further.

=== The New Group ===
Gregoire Boonzaier was born into the artist establishment in Cape Town. His father was D. C. Boonzaier, the cartoonist and connoisseur, and the family home was frequented by artists like Pieter Wenning, Gwelo Goodman and Moses Kottler; even Bernard Lewis the critic. He had exhibited at the Royal Academy, with the London Group and the New English Art Club. Instead of availing himself of these extraordinary credentials and ensconcing himself in the conservative establishment, he set out to organise young artists in order to exhibit independently of the South African Society of Artists.

With the aid of painter Freida Lock, Boonzaier formed the New Group and organised its inaugural exhibition from 4 to 10 May 1938 at the Argus Gallery, Burg Street. This show featured paintings by Boonzaier, Freida Lock, Charles Peers, Enslin du Plessis, Terence McCaw, Alexis Preller, Florence Zerffi, François Krige, Maurice Hughes, Rhoda Kussel, Joyce Ord-Brown, R. J. Pope-Ellis and Graham Young. Moses Kottler, René Graetz and Lipshitz contributed sculptures.

It was not just a matter of taste that divided the establishment from the New Group. The battle lines were being drawn by events in Europe, with official censorship of Modern Art in Nazi Germany and the opening of the Entartete Kunst (degenerate art) exhibition on 30 June 1937 in Munich.

Lipshitz formed a working association with painter Cecil Higgs, exhibiting together at 52 Dorp Street, Stellenbosch, in September 1938, in collaboration with René Graetz and Maggie Laubser. They would exhibit again, with John Dronsfield, in 1940, 1941 and 1945. The animosity in art circles came home to Lipshitz when, in August 1939, Bernard Lewis criticised a nude by Higgs at a New Group in the Stellenbosch University Library, giving rise to its removal, over public protest. Moreover, in November 1940, Edward Roworth, then Director of Michaelis and the South African National Gallery, openly supported Adolf Hitler's suppression of modern art. Lipshitz attacked him in a speech to The People's Club, quoted in full in Trek on 7 November 1940. It was a resounding defeat for the traditionalists.

=== Palm Studios ===
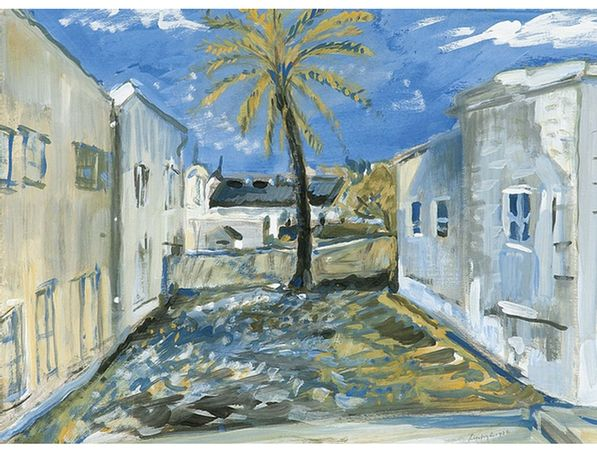
The Palm Studio (1936), gouache, 32 x 43.5 cm

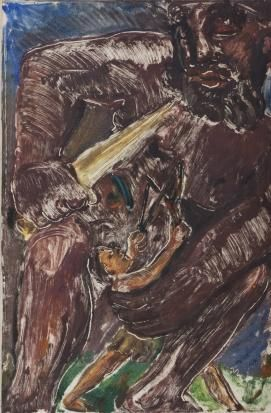
David and Goliath (1948), monotype, 53 x 34 cm

In 1932 Lipshitz had become friends with Expressionist painter Wolf Kibel and they leased premises at 18 Roeland Street, Cape Town, which they restored and named Palm Studios. They offered workshops and mentoring to younger artists like Gerard de Leeuw and Dorothy Leeb.

Kibel and Lipshitz developed a technique of monotype printing. The monotypes were the first to receive widespread attention in South Africa, becoming sought after collector's items. In June 1934 they held their first joint exhibition at the studio. Financial problems eventually led to their eviction in May 1937, after which they took up space in Madeira House in Stal Plein, with Freida Lock, John Wright and Hetta Crouse. It was a serious setback for Kibel, who was ill with tuberculosis. He was to die on 29 June 1938.

== England 1947 – 1948 ==
Lipshitz left South Africa in May 1947, taking up a studio belonging to Lady Nicholson (daughter of Sir Lionel Phillips) in Glebe Place, Chelsea, London. He worked for six weeks and participated in the Gimpel Fils Summer Exhibition. After this he moved to 18 Ellersdale Road, Hampstead to prepare for a London debut, an exhibition to open at the Galerie Apollinaire in Litchfield Street on 12 April 1948. Lipshitz exhibited 25 carvings at this occasion. Despite being his first exposure to a mature, informed audience, the works were well received by Maurice Collis writing for Time and Tide, Colin MacInnes in The Observer and Vorticist painter Colin MacInnes.

Lipshitz exhibited again at the A.I.A. Gallery, and at The Little Gallery, with Dolf Dieser. Part of the Galerie Apollinaire exhibition was shipped to Johannesburg, where an exhibition was held at Gainsborough Galleries. He also met sculptors Henry Moore and Jacob Epstein, spending some time with the latter in his studio. During a trip to Paris with friend Yankel Adler he met Jean Arp. In 1948 he visited the artist's colony at Zennor, in Cornwall, stayed with David Lewis and met the carver Sven Berlin.

Lipshitz returned to Cape Town in November 1948.

== Cape Town 1949 – 1967 ==
The internationalist bent in South African art was to culminate in the establishment of a South African Branch of the International Art Club of Rome, with Maurice van Essche as chairman. Van Essche, Lipshitz, Cecil Higgs, John Dronsfield, Irma Stern, Jean Welz, Alexis Preller and Walter Battiss were invited to participate in the Art Club exhibitions in Turin and Rome in early 1949.

As a result of the exhibitions in Italy, South Africa was invited to exhibit at the Venice Biennale in 1950. A committee convened by Minister of Education, Arts and Science, C. R. Swart and consisting of John Paris, Director of the South African National Gallery, Dr. J. W. von Moltke of the Michaelis School and Prof. F. E. J. Malberbe of Stellenbosch University selected Van Essche, Lipshitz, Higgs, Dronsfield, Stern, Maud Sumner and sculptor Elsa Dziomba to represent the country at the Biennale. The selection and published photographs of selected works sparked an uproar in the Afrikaans press, particularly Die Burger. The result was that the works went to Venice with the aid of private funds.

John Paris, as Director of the South African National Gallery (SANG), moved to assert the institution's independence and orient acquisitions policy away from the British School and towards South African art. The SANG acquired two Lipshitz works: Tree of Life (1950) in November 1950, and Jacob Wrestling with the Angel (1946) in March 1959. Graphic works were purchased in 1954, 1959 and 1962.

Rupert Shepard, Director of the Michaelis School, offered Lipshitz a post, which he assumed in 1950. In 1952 he was chief advisor to the SANG for the exhibition The Meaning of Sculpture. His works were acquired by other major collection in Southern Africa, and in June 1964, he was awarded the medal for sculpture by the Suid-Afrikaanse Akademie vir Wetenskap en Kuns, followed in October 1964 by an Associate Professorship at Michaelis.

Lipshitz emigrated to Israel in 1978, where he died in 1980.
