= Wolf Kibel =

South African artist

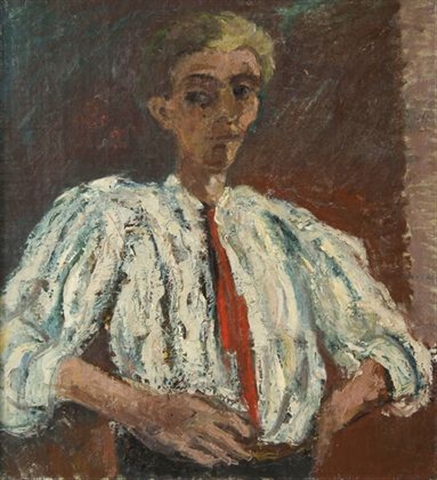
- Self Portrait, oil on canvas laid down on board, 430 x 395 mm
- Born: 16 December 1903; Grodzisk Mazowiecki, Poland
- Died: 29 June 1938 (aged 34); Cape Town, South Africa
- Known for: Painting, Drawing, Printmaking
- Notable work: Portrait of Freda Kibel (SANG); Still-life with bird (Pretoria Art Museum); Cellist (Pretoria Art Museum)
- Movement: Expressionism
- Patrons: Appelbaum; Hayim Nahman Bialik

Wolf Kibel (16 December 1903 – 29 June 1938) was a Polish-born South African painter and printmaker. He was partly responsible for the introduction of Expressionism to South Africa. His paintings and monotypes have earned him recognition as a sincere and gifted artist.

== Early life and education ==
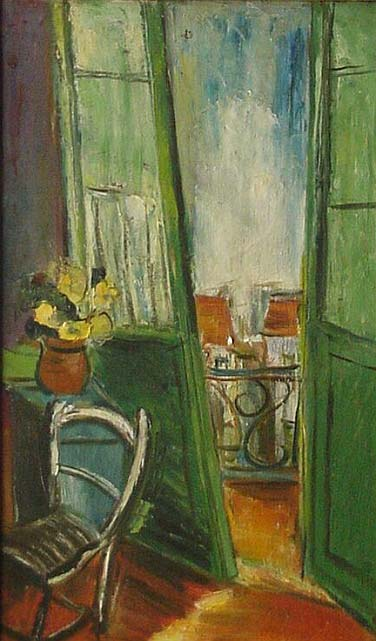
Studio, oil on canvas, 500 x 300 mm, Sanlam Art Collection

Wolf Kibel was born in Grodzisk Mazowiecki, a shtetl 32 km from Warsaw, in Congress Poland.

Kibel's father came from a family of singers and was employed by the community in the capacity of hazzan and shochet. He was relatively well paid and able to support a large family, of which Wolf was the third boy and fifth child of six. The family prized artistry; his father not only sang professionally, but carved miniatures, composed cantorial music, wrote verse and did bookbinding. Wolf participated in the choir his father trained and carved grotesques from his father's oil-stones.

At the age of three he was sent to the local school to be educated in Jewish culture. In 1911, when Wolf was eight, his father died, leaving the family bereft of financial support. With the outbreak of the First World War, they decided to move to Warsaw. There Wolf was apprenticed to a bookbinder, but lost this position after an accident. The family moved back to Grodzisk Mazowiecki and Wolf was apprenticed to a maker of shoe uppers. He apparently disliked this enough to run away to the countryside for several days, after which he was allowed to pursue his drawing and painting freely.

A friend of relatives in London, named Appelbaum, looked up the family when he visited Poland to paint a synagogue. It was the first time a professional artist saw Wolf's work. Appelbaum took him to Warsaw, where he met other artists, visited art galleries and read books and periodicals. He was impressed by the paintings of Jozef Israëls and admired the pictures of Jan Matejko.

== Early career and travels ==
=== Vienna ===
After the Treaty of Versailles, signed on 28 June 1919, nationalist Poles engaged in a wave of pogroms. This hostility, along with the prospect of conscription, persuaded Wolf to go to Paris in 1923. He crossed Czechoslovakia and arrived in Vienna several months later, having journeyed 524 km on foot. The end of the war was also the end of Austria-Hungary, and Vienna was an impoverished city full of refugees. Accommodation was in short supply and Kibel frequently resorted to sleeping in the Wiener Prater.

An antique dealer introduced him to the portrait painter Edmund Pick-Morino. Pick-Morino found Kibel a patron, a rich banker, and allowed him to draw and paint his models, some of whom were society ladies, wearing masks. He appears to have come into contact with the work of Oskar Kokoschka. However, his impoverished existence soon wore on him and, since he could not travel to Paris without papers, he was persuaded by Pick-Morino to go to Palestine.

=== Jerusalem ===
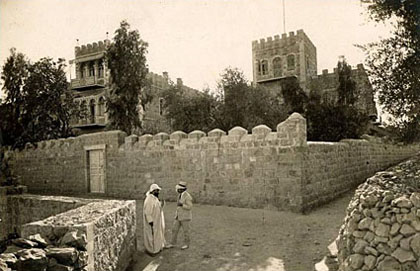
Bezalel buildings, Jerusalem, 1913

In 1925, Kibel left Vienna for Haifa, then to Jerusalem, contracting malaria along the way. In Jerusalem he went straight to hospital, and was discharged after two days, still very ill. Peripatetic and homeless, his only possession was a letter of introduction to the director of the Bezalel Art School, Boris Shatz, from Pick-Morino. He was disappointed by the patriotic Bezalel school pictures the pupils were expected to paint, and decided to go to Tel Aviv.

=== Tel Aviv ===
Still suffering from malaria and penniless, he slept on the beach. His only luck came when he visited a cousin, who worked as an immigration officer, who took him to a private doctor for a course of Salvarsan injections, which cured the malaria.

A friend by the name of Popek, subsisting on a tiny dairy farm on the outskirts of Tel Aviv with his wife, took him in. When Kibel insisted on not imposing on their kindness and made to leave, Popek pressed upon him his saving book, with enough money for him to find a room in the city. Now with some means, he met many painters, becoming friends with influential painter Yitzhak Frenkel, who had spent seven years in Paris. Though they spent much time together, Wolf would never be a pupil of Frenkel's.

It was in Tel Aviv that Wolf would meet his future wife Freda, and by her accounts they were an active part of a group of outspoken, highly critical and ambitious young people who preferred painting, literature, music, drama, even sport over politics. The artists were fanatical in their admiration for Paul Cézanne, to the point of slavish imitation. Kibel found this attitude dangerous and often expressed his beliefs to his friends.

Kibel had great admiration for Marc Chagall, whose work he considered to be a highlight of contemporary painting. He also came into contact with the work of Henri Matisse and was impressed by his skilled formalism.

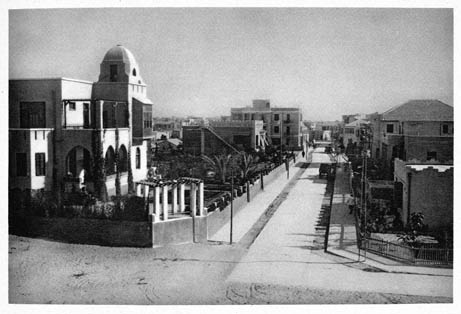
Bialik House, Tel Aviv, 1924

Kibel's chief media in Tel Aviv were watercolour and black and white drawing, requiring extreme control, since it dries quickly and mistakes are difficult to correct. This was also by financial necessity, since oil paints were more expensive. Kibel would only start painting in oils when a certain Dr. Zlockisty volunteered to supply the necessary materials. He met the famous Hebrew poet Hayim Nahman Bialik, who patronised his work. They became firm friends.

After four years in Palestine, Kibel passed the citizenship examination in Hebrew and became a Palestinian citizen. He had been stateless since birth. Coincidentally, an affidavit arrived from his brother Sam, who had settled in Cape Town, South Africa. The affidavit gave him permission to live in the Union of South Africa. Kibel's brother did not know he had a wife, and Freda left for Kraków in December 1928 where she gave birth to their first child.

=== Cape Town ===
Kibel arrived in Cape Town on 27 June 1929, the day their son Joseph was born in Kraków. He lived with his brother, who was a cantor in the synagogue in the Company's Gardens, but soon found that they did not see eye-to-eye on his continued pursuit of his art career, and felt regret at having moved to South Africa. Kibel soon took lodgings at the house of Roza van Gelden, principal of a primary school, who also offered him a studio at the school in exchange for lessons.

The art galleries in Cape Town were of no interest to Kibel, and he found its citizens indifferent to painting. He decided to hold an exhibition at Martin Melck House in December 1931, with the intention of raising money to join his wife and son in Tel Aviv. His work was met with outrage by a public and a coterie of art critics, notably Bernard Lewis of Die Burger, who were unfamiliar with or hostile towards the avant-garde art movements of the time. Notable exceptions were the art teacher Frank Barrington Craig, who praised his show, and artist Hugo Naudé, who was impressed enough to invite Kibel to his house in Worcester.

Kibel took up the invitation to visit Hugo Naudé and his wife, stayed on, and learned the technique of etching in his studio. The kindness of the Naudés persuaded Wolf and Freda that Paris would be too difficult an adjustment and Freda and Joseph arrived in Cape Town on 19 January 1933. Freda Kibel records that he was doing much work from life and using a wide variety of media: pastel, oil, watercolour, tempera, chalk, pen, etching and others. The influence of Matisse seemed to have disappeared in favour of a personally developed style.

Kibel moved his studio to a dilapidated building in Roeland Street, Cape Town, called Palm Studios, the upper storey of which he shared with friend and artist Lippy Lipshitz, who had just returned from Paris. The artists took pupils in order to augment their meagre income.

His 1935 exhibition at Ashbey's Gallery, opened by Lipshitz, was again met with public abuse, but favourable review by Melvin Simmers of the Cape Times, under the heading Virile Exhibition by Wolf Kibel. His repeatedly failed exhibitions, the birth of a second child, called Aaron, and the general hostility towards his art, eventually led to tension between the artists and their eviction in 1937.

== His art ==
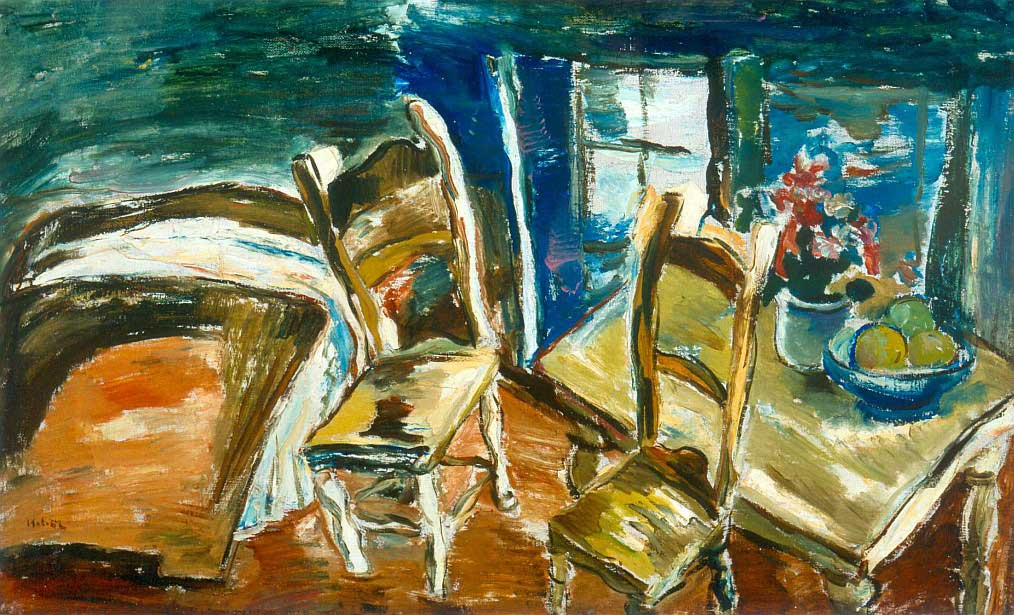
Interior with bed, oil on canvas, 310 x 670 mm, Sanlam Art Collection

I want to achieve a very high degree of complexity and order without any sacrifice of the feeling of spontaneity, and to do so through the fullest use of the varied means available, through shape and colour and tone value and paint quality, something like an orchestral effect in paint, in which the various distinct instruments blend together into a richly woven whole.

Wolf Kibel is frequently referred to as an expressionist artist, but his expressionism has none of the exuberance of Irma Stern or pastoral qualities of Maggie Laubser. He did not share the revolutionary anger of the original Expressionists and his influences ranged to Matisse, Chagall and Soutine. Like Chagall and Soutine, he was of Eastern European, and exclusively Jewish, extraction. Like Soutine he would employ a painterly approach, with rich impasto and expressive brushmarks.

Kibel was a strict formalist and he refused to provide explanations, engage in sales talk or even sign and date his works. He naturally despised exhibitions because of this and it certainly did not endear him to the public or the critics. Yet he was keenly sensitive to human values and this led him to avoid the picturesque, such as the impoverished Malay Quarter in Cape Town, which was, and still is, mined endlessly for saleable pictures. It is also to this that his wife would attribute his admiration of Rembrandt.

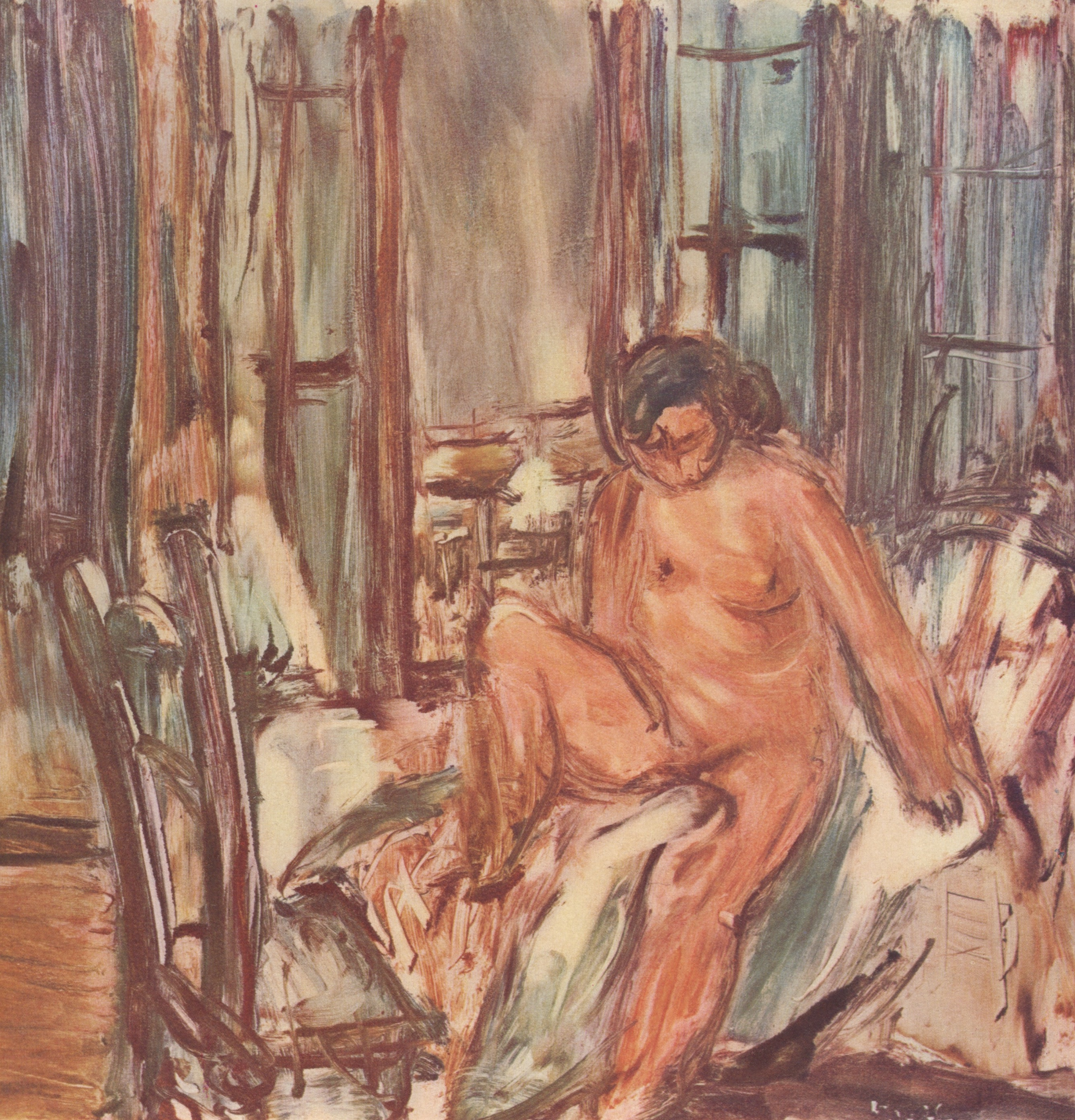
Nude on Chair, monotype, 229 x 229 mm

His sensitivity gave him 'the ability to animate and give inner life to objects normally considered prosaic because of their familiarity'. Freda Kibel was using Interior with bed as an example, in which distortions of perspective are reminiscent of Van Gogh. His skin tones are reminiscent of those of Renoir.

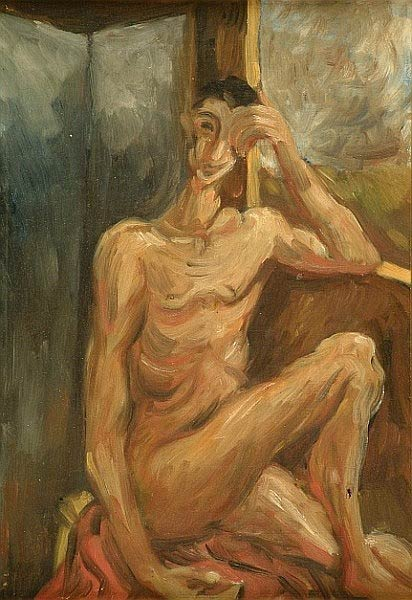
Nude Study, oil on canvas on board, 290 x 195 mm, Sanlam Art Collection

Kibel was the first to exhibit monotypes in South Africa in numbers, notably at the prestigious 1936 Empire Exhibition in Johannesburg. Working from metal plates, he brought the medium to expressive perfection and respectability as an artform.

== Final exhibition and illness ==
Kibel had been feeling ill for some time before his exhibition in 1937. He refused to see a doctor, fearing that a negative diagnosis would derail the exhibition. The exhibition contained 45 works, including a tempera portrait of his wife, bought by the South African National Gallery. Melvin Simmers commented on his coloured monotypes in the Cape Times of 24 June 1937:

Kibel has a very clear power of extracting essential rhythms and finding low, harmonious keys of colour with which to reinforce them.

A visit to a physician after the exhibition revealed that he had advanced tuberculosis of the lungs and throat. His health soon collapsed and he was removed to hospital. He received visits from many friends, notably several times a week from artists Cecil Higgs and Maggie Laubser, but succumbed to the disease after ten months, on Wednesday, 29 June 1938.

== Major collections ==
Wolf Kibel's works are included in a number of major collections:

- South African National Gallery, Cape Town
- Johannesburg Art Gallery, Johannesburg
- Pretoria Art Museum, Pretoria
- Durban Art Gallery, Durban
- King George VI Gallery, Port Elizabeth
- Tatham Gallery, Pietermaritzburg
- Spier Art Collection, Stellenbosch
- William Humphreys Art Gallery, Kimberley
- Sanlam Art Collection, Cape Town
