= Walter Westbrook (artist) =

South African artist

Walter Edward Westbrook (3 August 1921 – 15 January 2015) was a South African artist who lived latterly in Kent, England. He was well known particularly for his watercolour landscapes inspired by the arid plains of the Northern Cape and Namibia, and later by the countryside of Kent and the English Channel. Westbrook was born in Pretoria in 1921 and lived in Kimberley for several decades before emigrating to England in the late 1990s. He died in Kent in 2015, aged 93.

== Early years and wartime art ==
Westbrook began to paint at a young age and studied art under Walter Battiss in Pretoria. Not recognised officially as war artist, Westbrook nevertheless practised as a painter throughout his war years in North Africa, and in Italy where he was taken under the wing of Italian artist, Francisco Caprioli. Wartime works of his are exhibited at the South African National Museum of Military History. In the post-war period, Westbrook held a one man show in Pretoria in 1947.

== Kimberley ==
It was when living and working in Kimberley that he began to engage with the arid landscapes of the Northern Cape, the Kalahari and Namibia. He embarked on a full-time career as artist in 1970. Westbrook was a member of the 'Bloemfontein Group', founded in the 1960s by Dr F.P. Scott. Together with artists Marianne and Alexander Podlashuc, Fr Frans Claerhout, Stefan and Iris Ampenberger, Mike Edwards and Louis Scott, Westbrook contributed two works to the twenty four pieces making up the F.P. Scott Trust at the Oliewenhuis Art Museum in Bloemfontein. This collection, with its strongly regional flavour, signaled the Group's commitment to the establishment of the Oliewenhuis gallery.

== Kent ==
Having emigrated to the United Kingdom, Westbrook continued to find inspiration in landscapes, while rediscovering a passion for portraits, figures and still life painting.

== Exhibitions, commissions and collections ==
Walter Westbrook's work featured in solo and group exhibitions in South Africa, Germany, Spain, Portugal and the England. Major retrospective exhibitions of his work have been held at the William Humphreys Art Gallery in Kimberley, the University of the Free State and the University of Pretoria.

Other galleries that have exhibited his paintings include the Sandton Gallery, Leicester Galleries, Bakker Gallery, the South Africa Association of Arts, the Hoffer Gallery in Pretoria and the Oliewenhuis Art Museum in Bloemfontein. Westbrook's major art commissions included Standard Chartered Bank in New York, De Beers South Africa, De Beers Diamond Mines Kleinzee in Namaqualand, Southern Life South Africa, St James' Anglican church in Galeshewe, Kimberley, and the Agricultural Co-op Leeudoringstad.

The William Humphreys Art Gallery in Kimberley owns a significant collection of his work. His work is also to be found in private and public collections worldwide, including the Cotton Collection, USA, the Iziko South African Museum in Cape Town, Pretoria Art Museum, UNISA in Pretoria, Willem Annandale Art Gallery in Lichtenburg, the SASOL art collection, the Oliewenhuis Art Museum in Bloemfontein, the University of the Free State, the University of Johannesburg, the South African National Museum of Military History and various South African embassies in Europe.

== Publications and documentary ==
Westbrook's work is included in Berman's Art and artists of South Africa and in Alexander and Cohen's 150 South African Paintings Past and Present. It was also featured in episode 4 of the 13-part television documentary A Country Imagined, in which musician Johnny Clegg, as presenter, journeyed through South Africa engaging the connections between landscape, art and identity.
