= Cecil Higgs =

South African artist (1898–1986)

- Born: Cecil Marcia Higgs; 28 June 1898; Thaba Nchu, Orange Free State
- Died: 16 June 1986 (aged 87); Cape Town, South Africa
- Occupation: Artist
- Parent(s): Clement Higgs and Florence Morgan

Cecil Higgs (28 June 1898, Thaba Nchu, Orange Free State - 16 June 1986, Cape Town, South Africa) was a South African artist. She was the third child and second girl of the five children of Clement Higgs and his wife Florence. In 1912, Higgs's father died at the age of 50. In 1916, Higgs became a boarder at the Wesleyan Girls' High School (now Kingswood College) in Grahamstown. Her oldest brother, Clement jr., was killed in 1916 in World War I. Higgs briefly enrolled in the Grahamstown School of Art in 1918, however in 1920 she sailed to England and stayed abroad for 13 years. She trained in London at the Byam Shaw School of Art, at Goldsmiths' College and, from 1926, at the Royal Academy of Arts. Higgs was called back to South Africa, however, due to the illness of her mother, who died in 1934. Higgs held her first solo exhibition in the Domestic Science hall of Stellenbosch University in 1935, meeting the painter Wolf Kibel and the sculptor Lippy Lipshitz. In 1938, she held a joint exhibition with Rene Graetz, Maggie Laubser and Lippy Lipshitz. In 1938 she returned to Paris, however she left due to World War II. Higgs joined the New Group which was revolting against tradition forms of art. In 1939, Higgs began a lifelong friendship with English painter John Dronsfield. In 1953, she held her only solo exhibition in the Orange Free State. Higgs eventually settled in Sea Point, however the influence of the sea in her paintings led to her label as a marine painter. In 1964, she built a house in Onrust. Higgs was eventually diagnosed with Alzheimer's disease, and in 1984 she moved to Protea Park Nursing Home, where she died on 16 June 1986.

In 1964, Higgs was awarded the gold medal of the Suid-Afrikaanse Akademie van Wetenskap en Kuns.

== Sources ==
- Bertram, Dr. Dieter, Cecil Higgs Close Up
- Fransen, Hans, Three Centuries of South African Art
- Holloway, Victor, Cecil Higgs
