= Maggie Laubser =

South African painter and printmaker

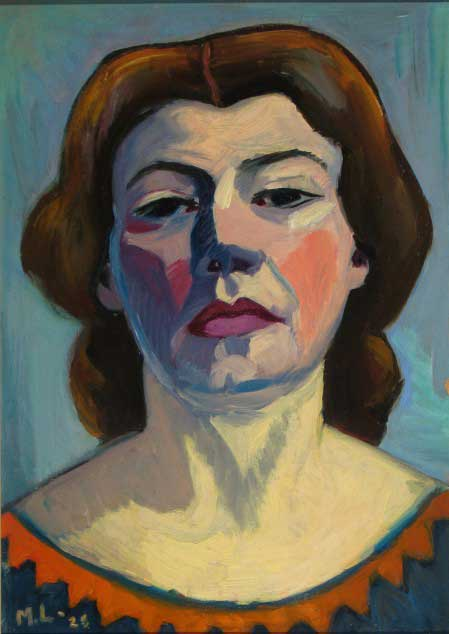
- Self Portrait (1928), 475 × 340 mm
- Born: Maria Magdalena Laubser; 14 April 1886; Bloublommetjieskloof; Malmesbury district, Cape Colony
- Died: 17 May 1973 (aged 87); Altyd Lig; Strand, Cape Province, South Africa
- Education: Slade School, London
- Known for: Painting, Drawing, Printmaking
- Notable work: Harvesters in Belgium (1921/22); Oestyd (Harvest time) (1932); Annie of the Royal Bafokeng (1945)
- Movement: Expressionism, Fauvism
- Awards: 1946: Medal of Honour for Painting by Suid Afrika Akademie; 1959: Honorary member Suid Afrika Akademie; 1968: Medal of Honour SAAA (Cape Region)
- Patrons: Jan Hendrik Arnold Balwé; M. L. du Toit

Maria Magdalena Laubser (/laʊbˈʃæ/; 14 April 1886 – 17 May 1973) was a South African painter and printmaker. She is generally considered, along with Irma Stern, to be responsible for the introduction of Expressionism to South Africa. Her work was initially met with derision by critics but has gained wide acceptance, and now she is regarded as an exemplary and quintessentially South African artist.

== Early life and education ==
Maria Magdalena Laubser was born on the wheat farm Bloublommetjieskloof near Malmesbury in the Swartland, a productive agricultural area in South Africa. She was the eldest of six children of Gerhardus Petrus Christiaan Laubser and Johanna Catharina Laubser (née Holm). Laubser's youth was dominated by the rural and pastoral and she delighted in this carefree existence.

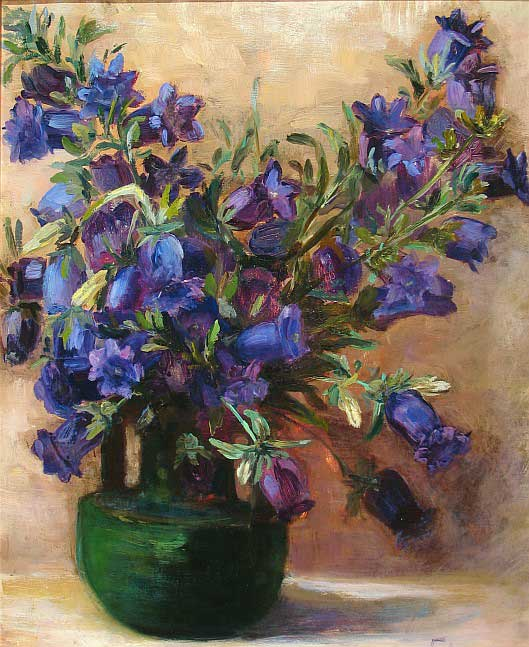
Still Life: Flowers in a Vase (1909–1913), oil on canvas, 520 x 420 mm, Sanlam Art Collection

After attending the farm school Rocklands, she left for boarding school at Bloemhof Seminary, Stellenbosch, where she was introduced to the art of drawing. She returned to the farm in 1901, and during a visit to Cape Town she met Beatrice Hazel, a realistic romantic style painter, who introduced her to Edward Roworth, giving impetus to her desire to study painting.

In 1903 she convinced her parents to let her go to Cape Town once a week for singing lessons. The difficulty of travel and the low opinion her mother had of her mezzo-soprano voice discouraged her, but it was at this stage that she started painting on her own.

She studied painting under Roworth in Cape Town for two months of 1903, during which time she received a silver medal for her work. By 1907 she had become proficient enough to be elected to the South African Society of Artists (SASA) and, in 1909, she was represented at the annual exhibition of the SASA and the Fine Arts Association of Cape Town. By 1910, she had her own studio in Strand Street, Cape Town.

During a 1912 visit to her nephew, Gert Coetzee, in Pretoria, she took up employment as a governess on a farm owned by the Wolmarans family in Ermelo district, Transvaal, where she also taught art and needlework. While on vacation in Durban with a friend, Sophie Fisher, she befriended Jan Hendrik Arnold Balwé (Consul for the Netherlands in Durban 1903–1913), a shipping-line owner who offered to finance her and her sister Hannah's studies abroad.

=== Holland and England ===
Laubser and her sister left for Europe on 4 October 1913, initially living in an artists' colony at Laren in an area called the Gooi. She met Ita Mees, a concert pianist and Frederik van Eeden, author and poet. She also befriended Laura Knight and Frans Langeveld, both painters. In the last years of his life, Anton Mauve (1838 – 1888), who was an important influence on Vincent van Gogh, lived in Laren. Laubser worked in the studio he established there.

At the outbreak of World War I she went to London. She initially stayed in Huntingdonshire and then, in October 1914, moved to a London hotel and registered at the Slade School of Art for the period October 1914 to March 1919. Henry Tonks, Walter Westley Russell and Ambrose McEvoy taught her drawing, while Philip Wilson Steer lectured her in painting. It seems that she never painted during her time at the Slade, instead concentrating her efforts on drawing of portraiture and figure studies. Laubser returned to South Africa briefly in 1915 to visit the new family farm at Oortmanspost, near Klipheuwel in the Cape Province and again in March 1919, after her studies were concluded.

== Early career and travels ==
=== Belgium, June 1919 to September 1920 ===
Laubser left London on 6 June 1919 for Belgium, staying at Antwerp and the Villa Chenes in the Nachtigalen Lei in Schoten. She befriended Arnold Balwé, son of her patron, who studied at the Academy. She might have accompanied Balwé as an occasional student, as is evidenced by a number of nude studies sketched during this period. There is also some evidence that she came into contact with the art of Die Brücke and Der Blaue Reiter during a stay in Munich in 1919.

=== Italy, October 1920 to August 1921 ===
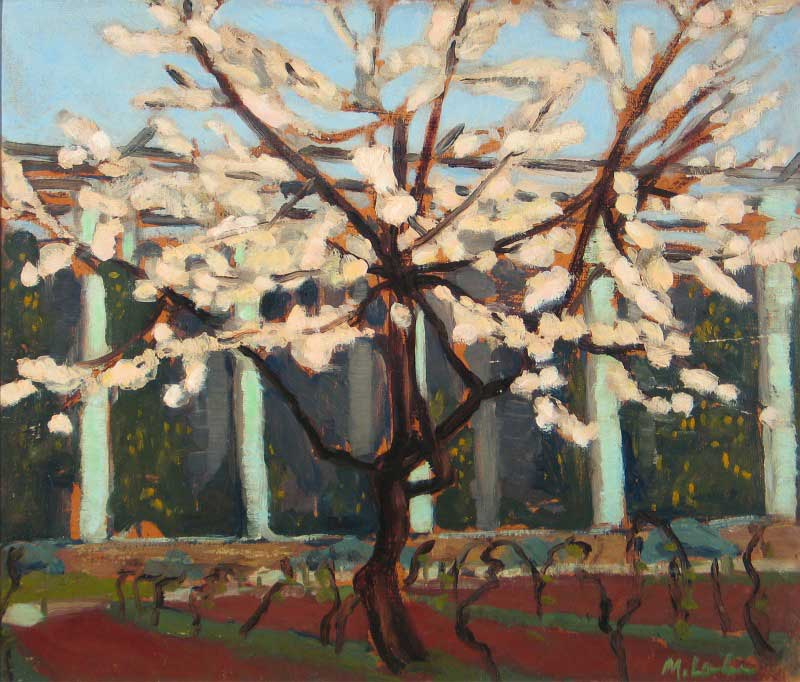
Pink Blossoming Tree, (1920–1921), oil on cardboard, 340 x 400 mm, Sanlam Art Collection

Laubser travelled with Balwé to Italy in August/September 1920 and lived and worked at Torri del Benaco and San Vigilio on the Garda Lake. During this time the couple was supported financially by Balwé's father and this gave them freedom to work on paintings for possible exhibitions instead of sale. A large number of signed and dated works from this period give some support to this.

J. H. A. Balwé had been ill towards the end of 1920, and Arnold Balwé and Laubser accompanied him to Bad Kissingen in mid-April 1921, where he died in April or May of that year. After Balwé's death Laubser travelled to Venice, where she visited the Doge's Palace (June/July 1921), then to Milan and, on 18 August 1921, back to Germany. On 19 September 1921 she arrived in Cape Town on the Union-Castle Line.

=== Germany, November 1922 to November 1924 ===
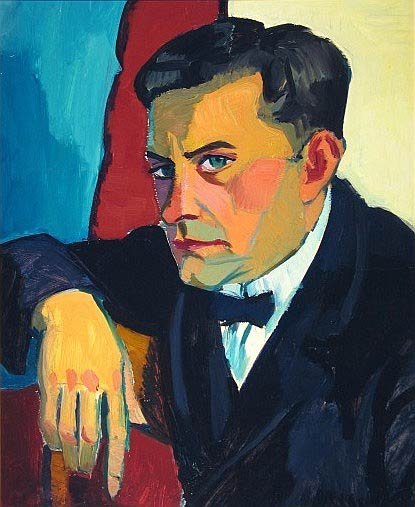
Portrait of a Man, Berlin, (circa 1923), oil on board, 595 x 475 mm

Laubser was issued with a visa by the German Consulate in Cape Town on 16 November 1922 and was installed at Kurfürstendamm 40, Berlin by 1 January 1923. Her address had apparently changed to Kurfürstendamm 43, Berlin by 23 January 1923. She looked up Irma Stern and they undertook a trip to the Baltic Sea at Ahrenshoop for three weeks in July 1923. After trips to Weimar and Bavaria and another change of address from Kalckreuthstrasse 5 to lodgings with a Fräulein Finck at Von der Heydt Strasse 1, south of the Tiergarten, which she obtained with the help of her friend Kate Mädler, she settled down to the cultural life of Berlin. She met members of the diplomatic corps, painted portraits and attended music concerts. She befriended pianists William Busch and Otto Glore.

It was in Berlin, from 1922 to 1924, that she came into contact with German Expressionism and was encouraged by Karl Schmidt-Rottluff. The works of Emil Nolde, Max Pechstein, Franz Marc and Erich Waske were available to her and clarified her ambitions. She singled out Franz Marc of Der Blaue Reiter and Nolde, Schmidt-Rottluff and Pechstein of Die Brücke as significant to her personality, although she would claim not to have been influenced by them. The extent of their influence is evident in that she came closest to the German Expressionist style during these years, in which she produced a series of ten lithographs called Visionen. During this time she created portraits that were consistent with the style of Fauvism, this was evident in her portraits through her color choice and use of pastel shades in her landscape works. Her influences were beginning to shine through into her work. Her brushwork and color choice became more expressive and less consistent with her earlier works, using angular features and colored shapes to both her landscape paintings and portraits.

On 14 August 1924 she made arrangements with Allison Bros., London to ship her paintings to South Africa.

== South African debut and critical reception ==
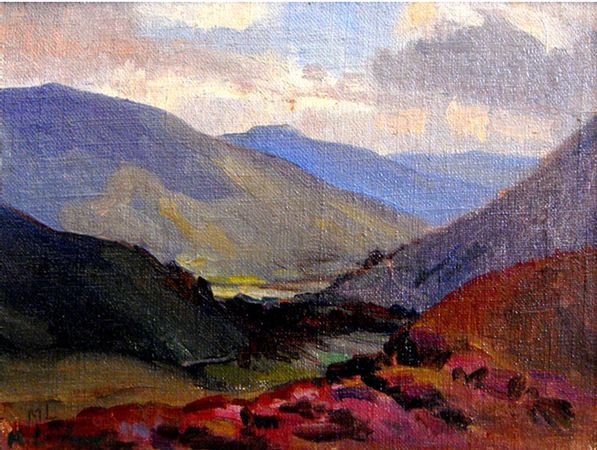
Bloublommetjieskloof, oil on canvas laid-down on board, 270 x 365 mm

In November 1924, Laubser returned to South Africa and settled at Oortmanspost, the family farm. She met sculptor Moses Kottler and the cartoonist D. C. Boonzaier, who introduced her to his son Gregoire, founding member of the New Group, and renewed her friendship with painters Ruth Prowse and Nita Spilhaus. She was asked to exhibit in Cape Town, and was cruelly disillusioned. Her work, like that of Irma Stern, met with fierce criticism, most notably from Bernard Lewis of Die Burger and The Cape Times, who as late as 1931 was able to write of her work in a group show:

Is there any normal, sane human being in all South Africa who is able to appreciate as a work of art, to enjoy as a picture...the one sent by Maggie Laubser? —Bernard Lewis

In April 1929 she met P. Serton and his wife, as well as A. C. Celliers and Koos Botha, all of whom encouraged her to have a one-man exhibition. Her first solo exhibition was held in Stellenbosch, with support from A. C. Bouman and Con de Villiers. During this time she also met Martin du Toit, who would become a fervent supporter, organising her first exhibition in the Transvaal in 1931.

== Empire Exhibition, Johannesburg, 1936 ==
On 3 May 1936, Laubser's father died, leaving the farm to her brother, and establishing a trust fund for her mother. Laubser would inherit the balance of the trust fund when her mother died on 20 November 1936.

Although she was treated harshly by the press, Laubser was elected to the selection panel of the prestigious British Empire Exhibition, the convener of which was M. L. du Toit, without her parents living to see this success. The Empire Exhibition was a quadrennial exposition, which in 1936 was held in Milner Park, Johannesburg, and it was representative of the best South Africa had to offer. It was here that Laubser became familiar with Alexis Preller, who would attract the ire of the critics for his work at the first New Group exhibition on 4 May 1938. Laubser would also be a member of the New Group, and present at the exhibition of 1938.

== Later years and legacy ==
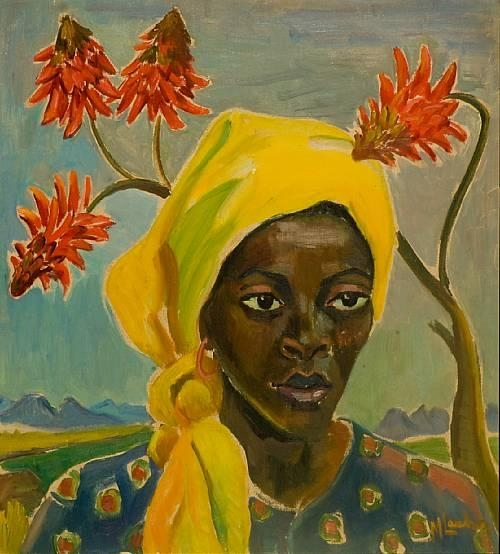
Annie of the Royal Bafokeng, 1945, oil on canvasboard

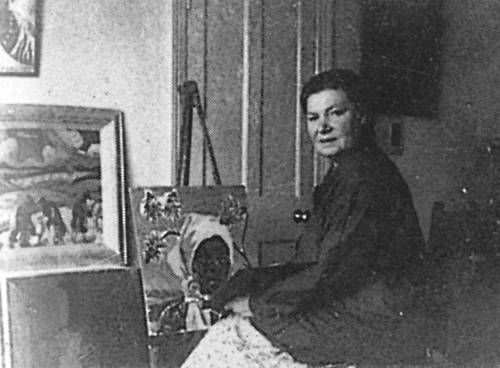
Laubser with Annie of the Royal Bafokeng in 1945

Laubser was active from as early as 1900 and continued working uninterrupted until her death in 1973. The catalogue raisonné compiled by Dalene Marais contains 1784 individual works. Her predominant style of work is generally accepted by many authors to be Expressionist, but there are also identifiable elements of Fauvism at work, and a pastoralism that belie the German Expressionist prototypes to which Laubser was exposed.

After the death of her parents she settled in Cape Town in 1937, taking a studio in Three Anchor Bay. In 1942, she moved to the Strand. She built a cottage there, called Altyd Lig (Always Bright), in 1947. On 28 May 1946 Prof. P. J. Nienaber announced that Laubser would receive the honorary medal of the Academy of Arts and Science. In 1945 she painted Annie of the Royal Bafokeng. In 1947 she received the Oscar Award for painting from Die Vaderland, a newspaper. In 1948, membership of the South African Academy for Arts and Science was awarded to her and the poet Elisabeth Eybers. She continued painting and continued to evolve her style, and in 1959 she was presented with an honorary membership of the Academy of Art and Science. The South African Association of Arts honoured her with a medal in 1968, presented by Prof. A. L. Meiring.

The South African National Gallery and the Pretoria Art Museum combined to host a major retrospective exhibition of Laubser's works in 1969. This was followed in 1987 by a retrospective of early works, again at the South African National Gallery, which ran from 2 December 1987 to 31 January 1988.

Maggie Laubser died on 17 May 1973 at Altyd Lig. There was an unfinished canvas on her easel.

== Major collections ==
Maggie Laubser's works are included in a number of major collections:

- South African National Gallery, Cape Town
- Johannesburg Art Gallery, Johannesburg
- Pretoria Art Museum, Pretoria
- Durban Art Gallery, Durban
- A. C. White Gallery, Bloemfontein
- Hester Rupert Art Museum, Graaff-Reinet
- Rupert Museum, Stellenbosch
- William Humphreys Art Gallery, Kimberley
- Sanlam Art Collection, Cape Town
