= Maud Sumner =

South African artist

- Born: Maud Frances Eyston Sumner; 1902- 1985; Johannesburg, Transvaal Colony
- Died: January 1985; Melrose, Johannesburg, South Africa
- Citizenship: South African
- Education: Roedean School (Johannesburg); Oxford University; Westminster School of Art; Académie de la Grande Chaumière
- Known for: Painting, stained glass design
- Movement: Ateliers d'Art Sacré
- Awards: Medal of Honour, Suid-Afrikaanse Akademie vir Wetenskap en Kuns (1971)

Maud Frances Eyston Sumner' (1902–1985) was a South African artist.

Sumner was born in Johannesburg, Transvaal Colony. After completing her schooling at Roedean in Johannesburg, she studied literature at Oxford University from 1922 to 1925 and then studied painting at the Westminster School of Art. Attracted to the French art scene, she moved to Paris in 1926, where she studied for four years at the Academie de la Grande Chaumière. She was part of the art movement called the Ateliers d'Art Sacré and loved the new style of painting taught by the masters George Desvallieres and his co-founder Maurice Denis, where everyday scenes were permeated with religious undertones. She was a designer for the stained glass manufacturer Goddard & Gibbs.

Although she had been separated from the South African art world, Sumner was invited by Walter Battiss to exhibit with the New Group in 1938.

She was awarded the Medal of Honour by the Suid-Afrikaanse Akademie vir Wetenskap en Kuns in November 1971, accompanied by a sensationally successful "semi-retrospective" exhibition at the South African Association of Art Gallery in Pretoria.

During her stay in Paris in 1978, Sumner was diagnosed with Guillain–Barré syndrome. She died in early January 1985 at her home in Melrose, Johannesburg.
