= Edith Louise Mary King =

Edith Louise Mary King (1871–1962) was a South African painter who worked primarily with watercolors, concentrating on landscapes and other still-life subjects.

Characterized by a high level of botanical detail, her paintings combine advanced planning and signification with a kind of stylistic innocence. King supported herself as an art teacher and, later, as headmistress at the Eunice School in Bloemfontein, South Africa. After retiring from teaching, King lived, traveled, and painted with her sister, encouraging friends and family in their artistic pursuits as well as organizing and participating in exhibitions. Five of her paintings were shown at the 1913 Armory Show. Since her death in 1962, King’s work has been featured at the Tatham Gallery and the mobile Everard Phenomenon exhibition in South Africa. Her work is also in the permanent collections of the South African National Art Gallery and the Pretoria Art Museum.
