= Langeveld =

Langeveld is a surname. Notable people with the surname include:

- Frans Langeveld (1877–1939), Dutch painter
- Niels Langeveld (born 1988), Dutch racing driver
- Ron Langeveld (born 1966), Dutch chess player
- Sebastian Langeveld (born 1985), Dutch road racing cyclist

== See also ==
- Langeveldt, a surname
