= Maurice van Essche =

Belgian-born South African artist

Maurice Charles Louis van Essche
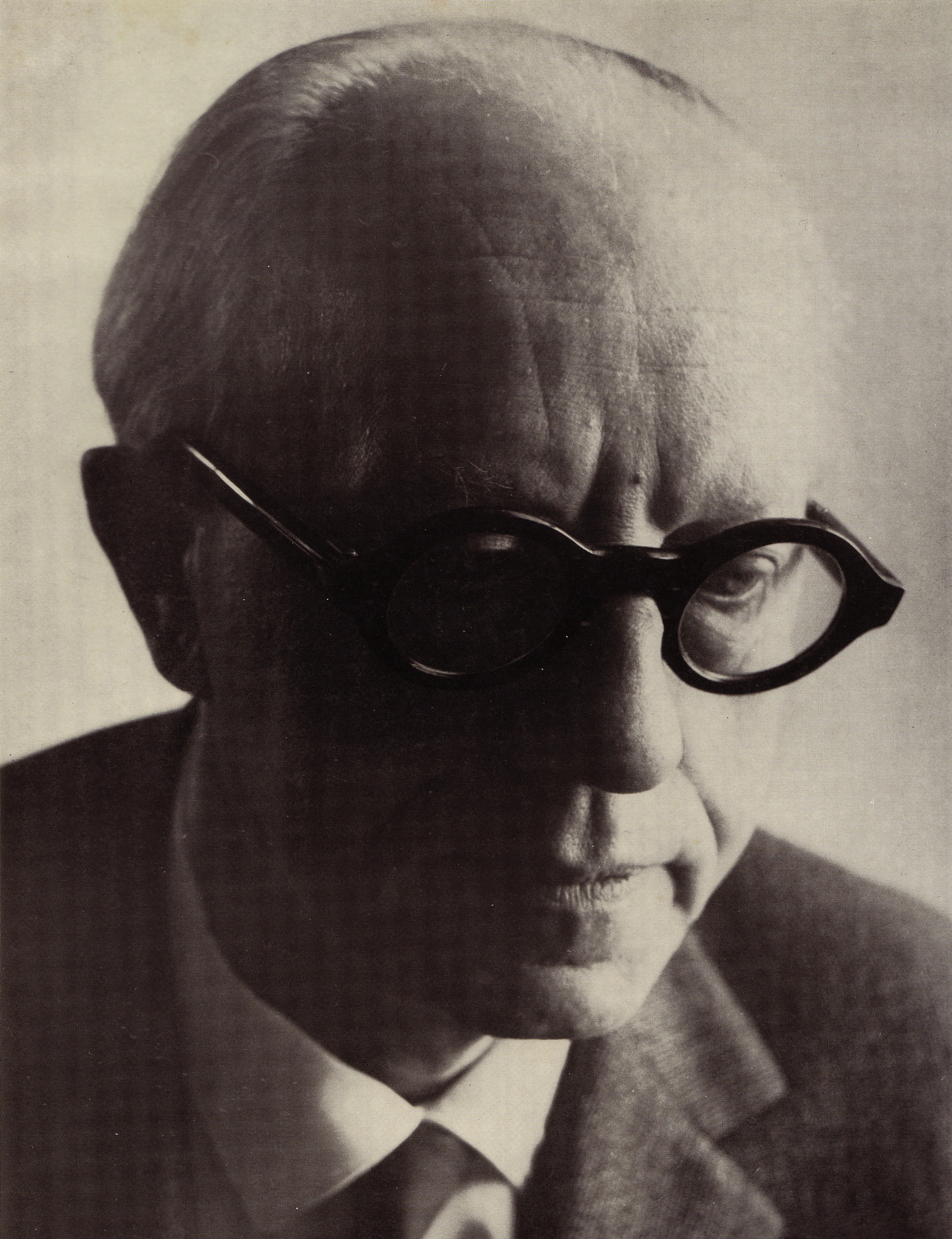
- Maurice van Essche in 1967
- Born: 4 October 1906; Antwerp, Belgium
- Died: 12 June 1977 (aged 70); Thonon, France
- Occupation: Artist
- Spouse: Lucette Josz (1908-1997)
- Children: Ludovic Henri Marie van Essche (1935-2020); Grandchildren: Paul-Henri van Essche, Catherine Jane Munro, Alexandra Roberta van Essche, Philippe Camille Maurice van Essche (1980-2020)
- Parent(s): Henri van Essche, Octavia de Ridder
- Website: www.mauricevanessche.org

Maurice van Essche (4 October 1906, Antwerp, Belgium – 12 June 1977, Thonon, France) was a Belgian-born South African artist and art teacher who achieved national and international recognition in his lifetime.

== Life ==
Maurice van Essche was born 1906, in Antwerp, Belgium, the seventh of eleven children, of whom only eight survived infancy. The family was French-speaking despite its Flemish roots; his mother's maiden name was De Ridder. He studied art at the Brussels Academy in 1924 under James Ensor, but halted his studies in 1925 for lack of funding, first working in a stained glass studio, then designing wallpaper – both of which experiences are actively reflected in many of his works. He also worked as a freelance cartoonist, but painted all the while. In 1933 he studied briefly under Henri Matisse in France (see Anecdotes), having met him by chance in an artist's supply shop in Cagnes, France. Thereafter he continued to paint and study full-time thanks to the sponsorship of his elder brother, Joseph Charles, and a group of friends.

His break came in July 1939 when he won a scholarship in a competition organised by the Belgian Government, who commissioned him to undertake a painting expedition to the Belgian Congo. His travels and experiences there influenced him profoundly, and the visions and emotions of that period echoed through his work for the rest of his life. In 1940 his wife Lucette (née Josz, practicing Catholic but of Hungarian Ashkenazy descent on her father's side, 1908–1997) and son Ludovic (1935–2020) fled German occupation of Belgium and joined him in the Congo. Lucette could not cope with tropical conditions and they moved to the relatively milder climate of the South African Cape rather than return to war-torn Europe.

Early days in South Africa were difficult, and on occasion van Essche traded paintings and drawings for food and other essentials. But he soon became a prominent member of the South African art community, exhibiting locally and later in Europe as well. As an active member of The New Group he contributed strongly to contemporary art in South Africa. He had a solid knowledge of both modern art trends and the history of European painting which he imparted in his role as teacher, a profession he regarded as equally important as creating. He taught at the Technical Art School from 1943 to 1945. In 1948 he founded the Continental School of Art in Cape Town, leaving in 1951 to become a lecturer at the Michaelis School of Fine Art at the University of Cape Town. He was appointed Professor of Fine Art in 1962 (see Anecdotes) and his success as a teacher is attested to by the number of his former pupils who have become prominent artists themselves.

Van Essche retired from academia in 1971, but continued to paint prolifically, despite poor health, including several heart attacks. He travelled in Europe and eventually settled near Thonon, France, at his wife's behest. His health continued to deteriorate, and he could not travel to attend his own retrospective exhibition in Cape Town in 1974. He missed Africa terribly, painting African scenes while searching in vain for local inspiration. His new themes included hippies and musicians, but he destroyed much of this work. His European landscapes from this period are dark and depressed, in stark contrast to the vibrant African scenes that flowed nonetheless. His oils continued to sell well in South Africa, and his reputation grew. He succumbed to a heart attack in June 1977 following a fall, and poor medical care.

== Chronological summary ==
- 1906 Born in Antwerp, Belgium
- 1911 Family moved to Brussels; educated there
- 1925 Interrupted his studies to earn a living working in stained glass studio
- 1930 Became a member of the group 'La Jeune Peinture Belge'; won silver medal at the International Exhibition, Antwerp
- 1933 Married Lucie Josz; studied under Matisse in South of France; group and one-man exhibitions in Paris and Belgian centres
- 1939 Government sponsored painting expedition to Belgian Congo
- 1940 Moved to South Africa; stayed temporarily in Cape Town; began exhibiting in South Africa
- 1943 to 1945 Lectured at Wits Tech Art School, member of New Group
- 1946 Founded Continental School of Art, Cape Town
- 1948–65 Regularly represented South Africa at international art exhibitions
- 1948 Foundation member of International Art Club; exhibited with fellow members in Turin, later elected chairman
- 1951 Awarded the title of Chevalier de Leopold II by King Baudouin of Belgium
- 1952 Appointed lecturer in Fine Art, Michaelis School, Cape Town; reputation in South Africa grown considerably; continued to exhibit at intervals in Europe
- 1962 Appointed Professor of Fine Art, Michaelis School, University of Cape Town
- 1966 Awarded Medal of Honour for Painting by South African Akademie
- 1967 Subject of monograph book 'Van Essche', by Carl Büchner, a former student
- 1970 Retired from Michaelis School.
- 1971 Departed for Europe; settled in Thonon-les-Bains, France.
- 1972 Awarded the title Officer of Order of Leopold II by King Baudouin of Belgium.
- 1974 Unable to attend Prestige Retrospective Exhibition of his work, South African National Art Gallery and Pretoria Art Museum
- 1977 Deceased 12 June, Thonon, France.

== Art ==
Van Essche's work exhibits contrasting influences, both artistic and environmental. From delicate renditions of the diffused tones of Flanders, to powerful depictions of Africa's landscapes, people and light, van Essche conveys unmistakable moods and a realism that is both beautifully poetic and strikingly honest. "There must be blood in my painting... I must remain human at all costs," he wrote to his friend Baron Robert d'Huart in 1961.

== Education ==
- 1924 Brussels Academy under James Ensor.
- 1933 Lessons with Henri Matisse, Paris, France.

== Awards ==
- 1930 Silver medal, International Exhibition, Antwerp
- 1951 Chevalier de Leopold II, King Baudouin of Belgium (Knighthood)
- 1966 Medal of Honour, South African Academy for Science and Art
- 1972 Officer of Order of Leopold II, King Baudouin of Belgium

== Anecdotes ==
Relationship with Henri Matisse: Maurice van Essche met Henri Matisse when buying paint in an artists' supply shop in 1933 in Cagnes, in the south of France. van Essche had just purchased the last tube of Lemon Yellow when Matisse entered the store and asked the clerk for the same article. On recognising the famous man, van Essche offered him the tube of paint. Matisse declined, but touched by the gesture invited van Essche to visit his studio. They formed a strong friendship and Matisse coached the young artist while in Cagnes, and later again in Paris.

Resemblance to Le Corbusier: On his visits to Paris before and after the war, van Essche frequented many well-known contemporary artists and architects of the time. Due to some similarities in appearance, and especially the style of glasses both men wore, he was often mistaken for Le Corbusier, much to his delight and amusement. It is unknown whether the two ever met.

As Professor of Fine Art at the University of Cape Town van Essche shared the position of Dean of Art and Architecture on an annual rotating basis with William Leonard Thornton WHITE, referred to by colleagues and friends as Thornton-White, until Thornton-White's death in 1965.

Direct descendant of Peter Paul Rubens: In the book on Maurice van Essche by Carl Büchner, published by Tafelberg in 1967, Büchner mentions van Essche's direct descendance from the flemish grand master, a claim originating from and sustained by van Essche himself. While there is no reason to doubt van Essche's good faith, the basis for the claim is unknown and direct descendance has not been researched or proven to date.

== Exhibitions ==
- 1927 First one-man exhibition, Brussels.
- 1930 and 1935 La Jeune Peinture Belge, Brussels and Paris.
- 1937 Ghent Salon.
- 1939 One-man art exhibitions, Elizabethville, Leopoldville.
- 1941 First South African one-man art exhibition, Cape Town.
- 1948 Overseas Exhibition of South African Art, Tate Gallery.
- 1948 to 1952 Exhibitions of International Art Club, South Africa.
- 1950 Venice Bienalle.
- 1952 Van Riebeeck Tercent Exhibition, Cape Town; Venice Bienalle.
- 1953 Rhodes Centenary Exhibition, Bulawayo.
- 1954 Venice Bienalle.
- 1956 First Quad of South African Art.
- 1957 São Paulo Bienalle.
- 1960 Second Quad of South African Art.
- 1961 São Paulo Bienalle.
- 1963 São Paulo Bienalle.
- 1965 São Paulo Bienalle.
- 1966 Republic Fest Exhibition, Pretoria.
- 1969 Group Exhibition, 'Le Petit Palais', Geneva.
- 1971 Republic Fest Exhibition.
- 1974/5 Prestige Retrospective Exhibition, South African National Art Gallery and Pretoria Art Museum.

== Public Collections ==
South African National Art Gallery; Johannesburg Art Gallery; Pretoria Art museum; Durban Art Gallery; William Humphreys Art Gallery; AC White Gallery, Bloemfontein; Hester Rupert Museum; Rembrandt Foundation; King George VI Gallery; University of Wits Art Gallery, UNISA.

== Bibliography ==
- van Essche, by Carl Buchner, 1967, Tafelberg, Cape Town, South Africa
- Art & Artists of South Africa by E. Berman, 1994, Southern Book Publishers
