= Frederick Timpson I'Ons =

British painter

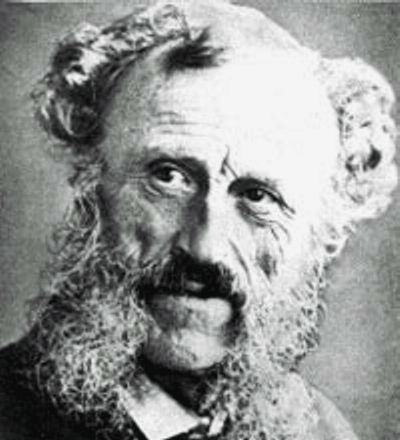
Frederick Timpson I'Ons, circa 1870

Frederick Timpson I'Ons (15 November 1802 in Islington – 18 December 1887 in Grahamstown) was a British-born Cape Colony painter, one of the eight children of John I'Ons, who was master of a riding school in Islington.

I'Ons showed an early aptitude for drawing, was influenced by, and became a friend of the sculptor John Francis and his daughter Mary, who married another sculptor, Thomas Thornycroft. He later ran an art school in Marylebone where he taught drawing, painting, and commercial subjects.

On 31 May 1827 Frederick I'Ons married Ann Frazer, whose ill-health led in 1834 to the young couple's emigrating to the Albany district of Grahamstown. They arrived at the start of the Sixth Frontier War, prompting Frederick to volunteer his services. This date marks the first of his 'Aquila Caricatures', a series of informative though jocularly offensive barbs directed at Andries Stockenström, the lieutenant governor of British Kaffraria at the time.

The patrons of I'Ons were largely military types who commissioned portraits of the local Xhosa chiefs, such as Sandile and Khama. I'Ons was outstanding in depicting the Bantu and Hottentot passers-by. The images of these 'native characters' are regarded as his most important works, reflecting a great deal of sensitivity and skill in their portrayal, and likened to those of Adriaen van Ostade. As is often the case with artists who have to produce potboilers to survive, their best work is neglected in the interests of financial exigencies.

Except for his short association with John Francis, I'Ons had no formal training in art. Still, his landscapes of the Eastern Cape have the charm usually encountered in naïve art with woodland scenes reminiscent of Watteau. Even so, his landscapes are sometimes criticised as being gloomy and uninspired. He eked out his income by painting stage decor, portraits of notable Grahamstown residents and giving art classes. A trip to the diamond diggings at Kimberley did not improve his fortunes.

His works provide an important insight into frontier life in the 1800s, and have been exhibited by the Tate Gallery in London (1948), the South African National Gallery in Cape Town (1976), and King George VI Gallery in Port Elizabeth (1990). His paintings may be found in private and corporate ownership, and at museums and galleries like the Africana Museum, Albany Museum, Fort Beaufort Historical Museum, King George VI Art Gallery, South African National Gallery, the University of Stellenbosch, the William Fehr Collection, William Humphreys Art Gallery and the 1820 Settlers Memorial Museum.

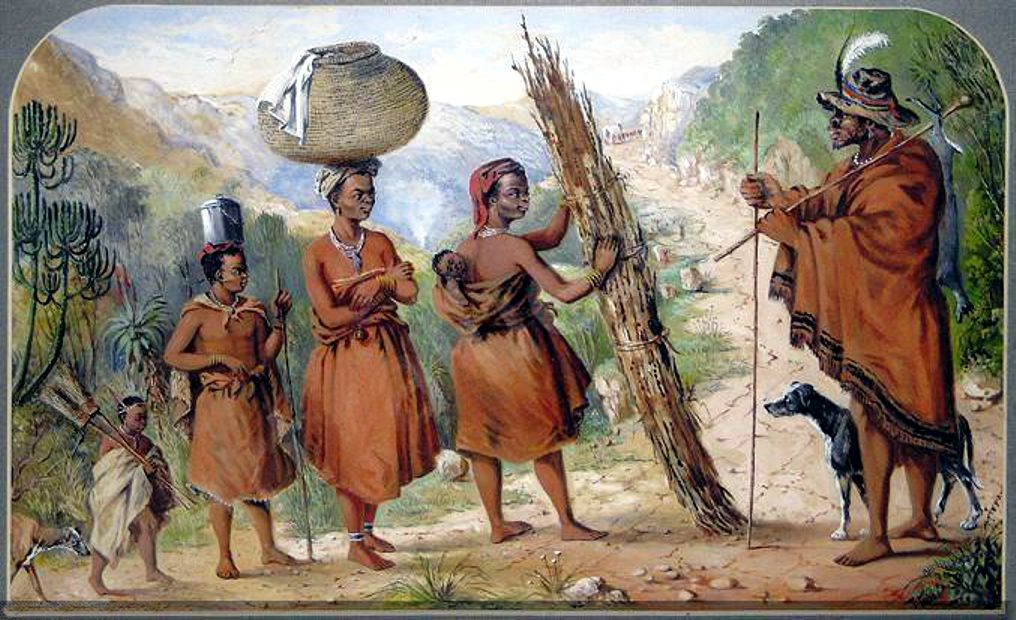
Group of Xhosas on the Grahamstown road

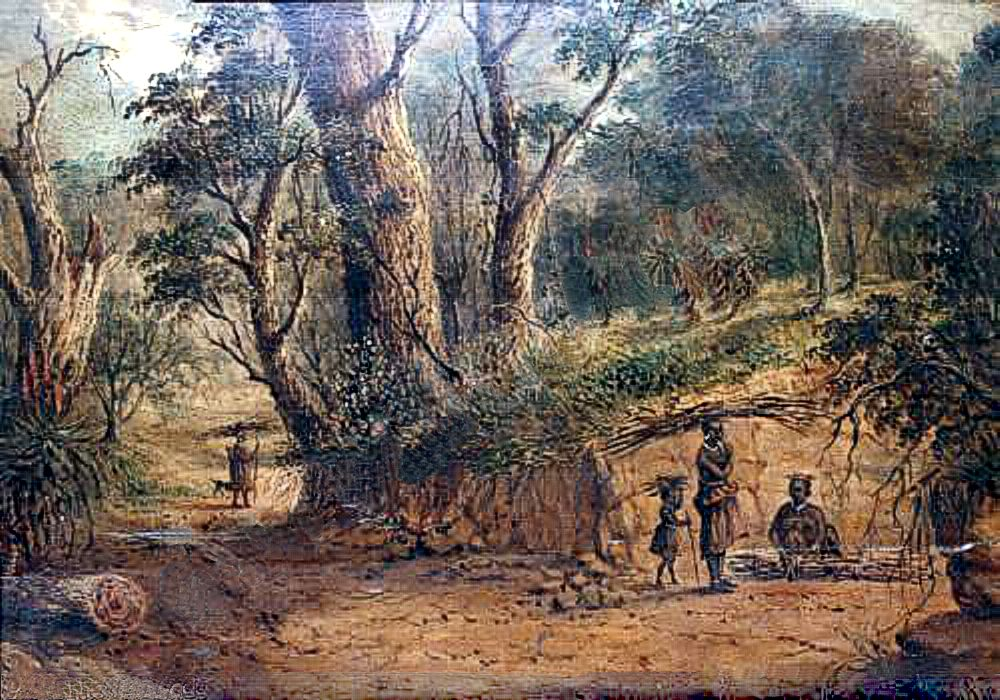
Xhosas on a track

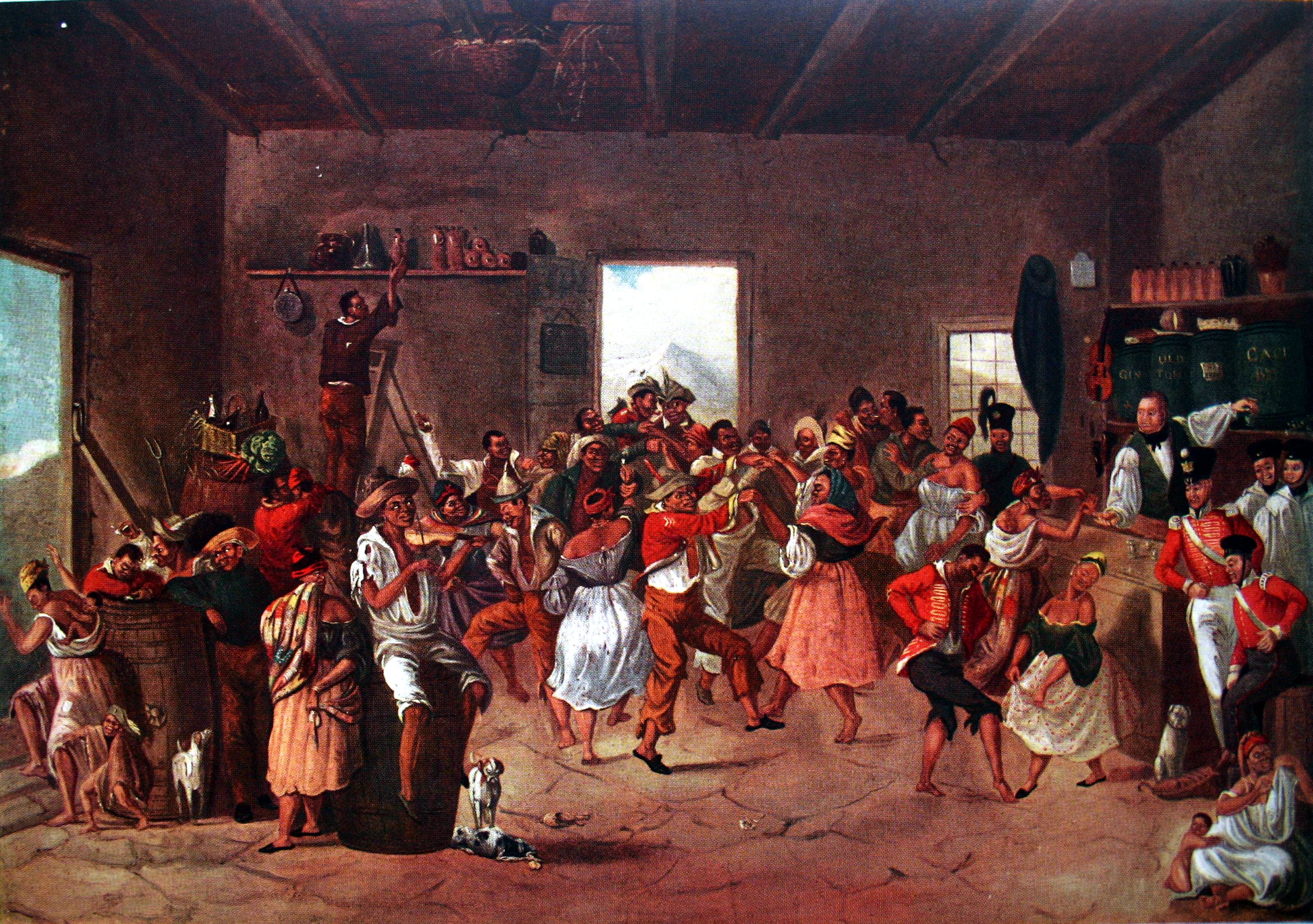
Canteen Scene, Potter's Inn, Grahamstown

== Bibliography ==
- Frederick I'Ons - Artist - Redgrave (J.J.) & Bradlow (Edna)(Maskew Miller, Cape Town, 1958)
