= Norman Catherine =

South African artist

- Born: 1949, September; East London, South Africa
- Citizenship: South Africa
- Occupation: Artist
- Years active: 1969

Norman Catherine (born September 1949 in East London, South Africa) is a South African artist whose body of work spans painting, sculpture, printmaking and mixed media. He collaborated closely with iconic South African artist Walter Battiss on the Fook Island concept from 1973.

Norman Catherine's artistic career began in 1969 with his first solo exhibition at the Herbert Evans Gallery in Johannesburg, which included oil paintings on wood, bone, wire and a variety of found objects. Since then he has continued to create new work and develop his style. Hazel Friedman describes his development as follows

"In the thirty years spanning his past and present output, Catherine’s visual trademarks have included rough-edged comical and nightmarish forms, rendered in brash cartoon colours. His idiosyncratic vision – a combination of dark cynicism and exuberant humour, as well as his innovative use of everyday material, has secured his place at the forefront of South African contemporary art" Hazel Friedman on Norman Catherine.

He lives and works from his home, named Fook Manor, near the Hartbeespoort Dam outside of Pretoria.

== Style and themes ==
Norman Catherine's work spans a variety of media including painting, sculpture, mixed media, printmaking, tapestry and bronze. His work is characterised by a dystopian vision of the socio-political landscape that shapes his psyche. Themes such as history, horror, crime, conflict, psychosis, politics and pathology stimulate his creative process, which oscillates between the macabre and the comic. He conveys his cynical outlook by juxtaposing dark and light sentiments, moving between an inner hallucinatory realm and a literal commentary on the material world.

His work is represented in public and private collections in South Africa and internationally, including the Museum of Modern Art (MoMA) and the Brooklyn Museum in New York. In 1993, he was invited to exhibit for the South African Pavilion at the 45th Venice Biennale. In 2006, the Johannesburg Art Gallery (JAG) presented a retrospective entitled 'Now & Then'.
