= Langeveldt =

Langeveldt is a surname. Notable people with the surname include:

- Charl Langeveldt (born 1974), South African cricketer
- Edgar Langeveldt, Zimbabwean stand-up comedian, singer-songwriter and actor
- Lee Langeveldt (born 1986), South African association footballer

== See also ==
- Langeveld, a surname
