= New Group =

The New Group was a group of young South African artists who, starting in 1937, began to question and oppose the conservatism of the South African Society of Artists. Its founding chairperson was Gregoire Boonzaier; other founding members were Lippy Lipshitz, Frieda Lock, Cecil Higgs. Walter Battiss, and Terence McCaw.

The New Group was a pioneering collective of South African artists established in 1937. Formed by a cohort of young artists returning from Europe, the group aimed to challenge the conservative art scene in South Africa, particularly the dominant values promoted by the South African Society of Artists. Concerned primarily with enhancing the working conditions and status of local artists, the New Group pursued initiatives to support artists financially, establish cooperatives to import materials affordably, and organize national exhibitions.

Founding members included Gregoire Boonzaaier, who served as the group’s first chairman, along with Lippy Lipshitz, Frieda Lock, Cecil Higgs, and Terence McCaw. To broaden its reach, the group also invited artists from Transvaal, a responsibility taken on by Walter Battiss. Membership in the New Group was exclusive, available only through invitation. The group’s inaugural exhibition took place in Cape Town on May 4, 1938, featuring 17 artists. This event attracted over a thousand attendees and included lunch-hour lectures. Notably, Alexis Preller's work drew criticism for its "modernist" style, which some viewed as contentious.

Complete list of members of the New Group 1938 to 1953:

Battiss, Walter Boonzaier, Gregoire Broadley, Robert Desmond, Nerine Dixon, Leng Domsaitis, Pranas Du Plessis, Enslin Dziomba, Elsa Esmonde-White, Eleanor Everard, Rosamund Everard-Haden, Ruth Farley, John Frank, Audrey Graetz, René Gluckman, Judith Hahn, Siegfried Hendrikz, Willem	Higgs, Cecil Hillhouse, May Hughes, Maurice Hutton, Phay Juta, Jan King, Edith Kottler, Moses Krenz, Alfred Krige, François Kussel, Rhoda Laubscher, Erik Laubser, Maggie Le Roux, Smith Le Roux Lewis, Neville Lipshitz, Lippy Lock, Freida Long, Geoffrey	McCaw, Terence Naudé, Hugo Ordbrown, Joyce Peers, Charles Pope-Ellis, Jeanette Preller, Alexis Prowse, Ruth Sargent, Wren Shephard, Rupert Sumner, Maud Van Essche, Maurice Wallis, Joyce Welz, Jean Wolfe, Edward Wright, John Young, Graham Zerffi, Florence	New Group Guest Artists: Borbereki, Zoltan Busk, Bridget Dixon, John Harries, Katrine Hart, ‘Pat’ Patrick Harvey, Russell Joubert, René Ronsheim, Nan Sekoto, Gerard Theron, Leo Van Heerden, Piet Vaughan-Williams, Mary

The group quickly became one of South Africa's most influential art organizations, regularly holding exhibitions nationwide over the next 15 years. Through these exhibitions, the New Group introduced the public to modern and avant-garde art, a sharp contrast to the more traditional art commonly displayed. They also promoted a unique concept of "art by barter," where artists could trade artworks for goods and services. For instance, Lippy Lipshitz exchanged his art for piano lessons for his daughter, while Neville Lewis bartered a painting for ten cases of whiskey.

The New Group’s exhibitions often stirred controversy, as they featured some of the country’s most progressive art. One incident involved the forced removal of a Cecil Higgs painting from an exhibition at Stellenbosch University's library, highlighting the group's frequent clash with conservative standards. In 1947, the group achieved national recognition when the South African government selected it to represent the country’s finest painters and sculptors. Works from the New Group members were subsequently chosen by the Department of State Information for international exhibitions.

Following World War II, the New Group's collaborative efforts became increasingly formalized, leading to its gradual institutionalization. In 1953, the group held its final exhibition in Cape Town before disbanding, marking the end of an influential era in South African art history.
