= William Humphreys Art Gallery =

Art Museum in Kimberley, Northern Cape

Coordinates: 28°44′37″S 24°46′08″E

The William Humphreys Art Gallery, in Kimberley, South Africa, was opened in 1952 and named after its principal benefactor, William Benbow Humphreys (1889–1965).

== Origins ==
In 1948, William Humphreys gave to the City of Kimberley a major part of his personal collection of sixteenth and seventeenth century Dutch and Flemish Old Masters, British and French paintings, antique furniture and other objets d'art. Significant South African works of art assembled by members of the Art Section of the Kimberley Athenaeum and The Max Greenberg Bequest were added to form the nucleus of the Gallery's collection. The Humphreys Loan Collection and Timlin Collection on indefinite loan from De Beers Consolidated Mines Limited, augment it.

== Growth ==
More recently the Meyer Collection of European and Oriental Porcelain and the Lawson Collection of Old Master Drawings and Prints have been acquired.

At present the William Humphreys Art Gallery concentrates on collecting South African works of art, and has built up an important art reference library.

== Artists represented ==
=== Flemish and Dutch painters ===
The Old Masters stem from the Michaelis collection. Among the earliest works are landscapes by Jan Brueghel the Elder (1568-1625). There are also landscape paintings by Antonie Waterloo (1610-1676), Jan Wijnants (1615-1679), Jan Dirksz Both (1610-1652), and Philip Wouwerman (1619-1668). Landscape with Ruins by Karel Dujardin (1622-1678) and a river scene by Jan van Goyen (1596-1656) are among the most renowned selections. Among the still lifes are works by Cornelis de Heem (1631-1695), Jan Frans van Son (1658-1704), Jan van Huysum (1682-1749). Other well-known paintings include The Woodcutters by Adam Pynacker (1622-1673), Fighting Cats by Frans Snyders (1579-1657), Interior by Egbert van der Poel (1621-1664), Portrait of a Man by Caeser van Everdingen (1606-1678), Portrait of a Woman by Gonzales Coques (1614-1684), Suitors in a Garden by Dirck Hals (1591-1656), Woman on Horseback by Eglon van der Neer (1635-1703), and Rest on the Flight to Egypt by Gerrit Dou (1613-1675).

=== French painters ===
The collection is limited. It includes works by Jean-Baptiste Greuze (1725-1805) and Gaspard Dughet (1594–1665). The painting Shipwreck of the Three Master is by Eugène Isabey (1767–1855).

=== Italian painters ===
The best-known artists in this group are Andrea del Sarto (1486–1530), Emma Ciardi (1879–1933) en Salvator Rosa (1615–1673).

=== British painters ===
Paintings in this collection include Mrs Irvine J. Boswell by Henry Raeburn (1756–1823), Lord Eldin by Andrew Geddes (1783–1844), Mother and Child: The Bath by William Orpen (1878–1931), and a self-portrait by David Wilkie (1785–1841). Other works are included by Peter Lely (1618–1680), William Etty (1675–1734), William Hogarth (1697–1764) en George Romney (1734–1802).

=== South African painters ===
Many of the most famous South African artists are represented in the gallery. The most important collection is that of Alexis Preller (1911-1975). Irma Stern (1894–1966) has three portraits and a still life there. Among the oldest artists whose work is shown here is Thomas William Bowler (1812-1869) and Frederick Timpson I'Ons (1802-1887). Bowler painted Cape Town and Table Mountain from Table Bay. Seven paintings by Frans Oerder (1867–1944) include Girl Reading and A Boy. Highveld, Transvaal is by Jacobus Hendrik Pierneef (1886–1957). Other highlights include De Beers Mine (The Big Hole), Old Church, Tulbagh, and Victoria Falls by Robert Gwelo Goodman (1871-1939); Bowl with a clump of mixed flowers by Wolf Kibel (1903–1938); The Return of the Rajah and The Messenger of Death by John Henry Amshewitz (1882-1942); Ship in Durban Harbor by Clement Senèque (1897-1930); Pool in the Komati River by Rosamund Everard-Steenkamp (1907-1945); and Rock Landscape by Stefan Ampenberger (1908–1983).

=== Other artworks ===
Controversial nudes by Moses Kottler (1896-1977) are found here, as well as several sculptures by Anton van Wouw (1862-1945). A modern statue is Sydney Kumalo's Sitting Woman. Bonnie Ntshalintshali's Tamfuti is a striking modern ceramic work. Other points of interest in the collection of plastic and decorative arts besides painting are 18th-century French furniture, examples of South African stinkwood and yellowwood furniture, Dresden and Meissen porcelain, and 19th-century Cape silver work by Johannes Casparus Lotter. A library of germane books is here as well.

== Serving the community ==
Additional to its collecting and exhibiting functions, the William Humphreys Art Gallery serves as an educational and cultural centre, with an outreach programme taking exhibitions to rural towns in the Northern Cape.

== Bibliography ==
- Fransen, Hans (1978). Guide to the museums of Southern Africa. Cape Town: Southern African Museum Association, 1978.
- Holloway, Rosemary. "A short history of the William Humphreys Art Gallery." Lantern, tydskrif vir kennis en kultuur, yearbook 33, no. 3, July 1984.
- Kros, Neville. "The William Humphreys Art Gallery Kimberley." Lantern, tydskrif vir kennis en kultur, yearbook 10, no. 1, September 1960.
