= John Dronsfield =

English artist

John Dronsfield (7 March 1900–12 July 1951) was an English artist known for his work in South Africa.

== Life ==
Born in Oldham, Lancashire, Dronsfield studied briefly at the Manchester School of Art before enlisting with the Young Soldiers’ Battalion – Cheshire Regiment in 1918. He was discharged as physically unfit in 1919 and began working in stage design with Sybil Thorndike in London. He worked as an illustrator and advertisement designer in the 1930s, illustrating The Weekend-End Book (Nonesuch Press) in 1936. He emigrated to South Africa in 1939, continuing his career as a stage designer. In 1942, he published Non-Europeans Only, a book of drawings of the Cape Coloured community.

He held his first solo exhibition in Cape Town in 1939, followed by joining a South African exhibition at the Tate in 1948 and the Venice Biennale in 1951. He committed suicide in 1951, following his death, two memorial exhibitions were held in Cape Town in 1955 and 1967.

In 1955, Oxford University Press published a collection of his verses and satires. Two portfolios of his graphic studies were also published under the title African Improvisations.
