= Frans Langeveld =

Dutch painter

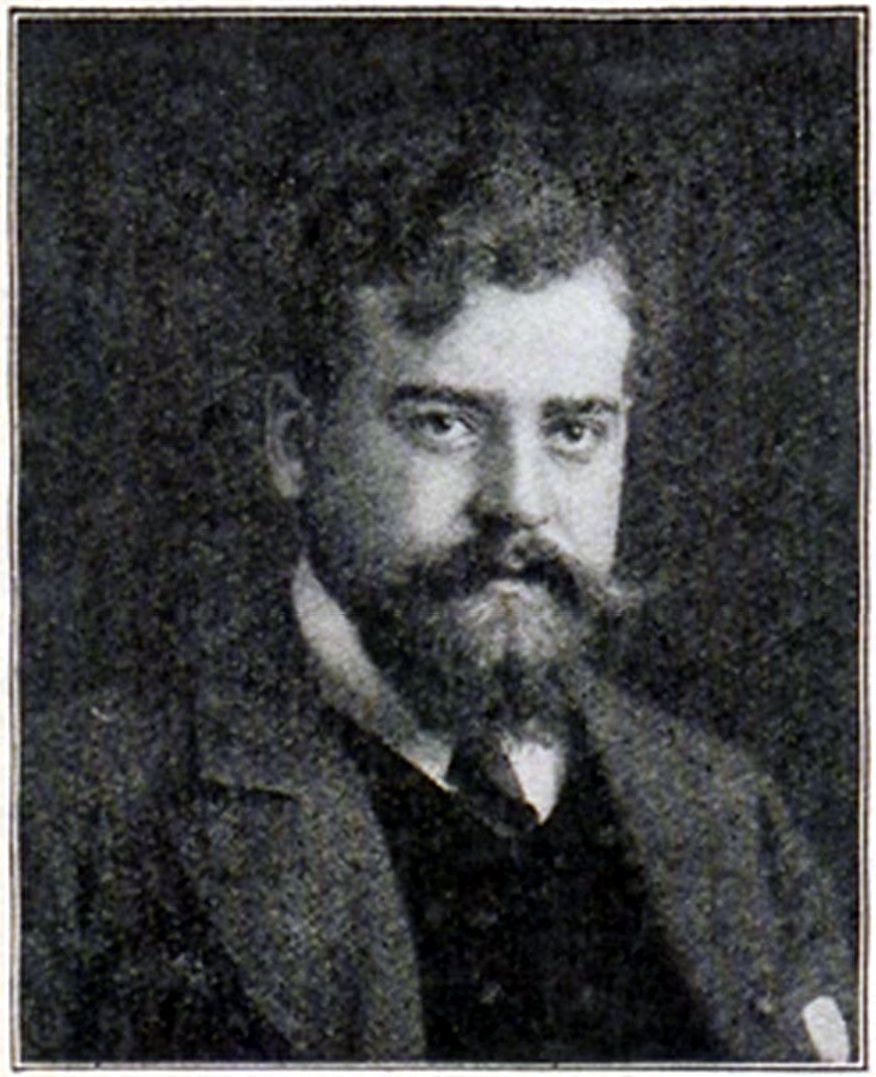
- Born: 16 February 1877; Amsterdam, Netherlands
- Died: 27 June 1939 (aged 62); Laren, Netherlands
- Occupation: Painter

Frans Langeveld (16 February 1877 – 27 June 1939) was a Dutch painter. His work was part of the painting event in the art competition at the 1936 Summer Olympics.
