= Martin Melck House =

Coordinates: 33°55′09″S 18°25′11″E

- Martin Melck-Huis
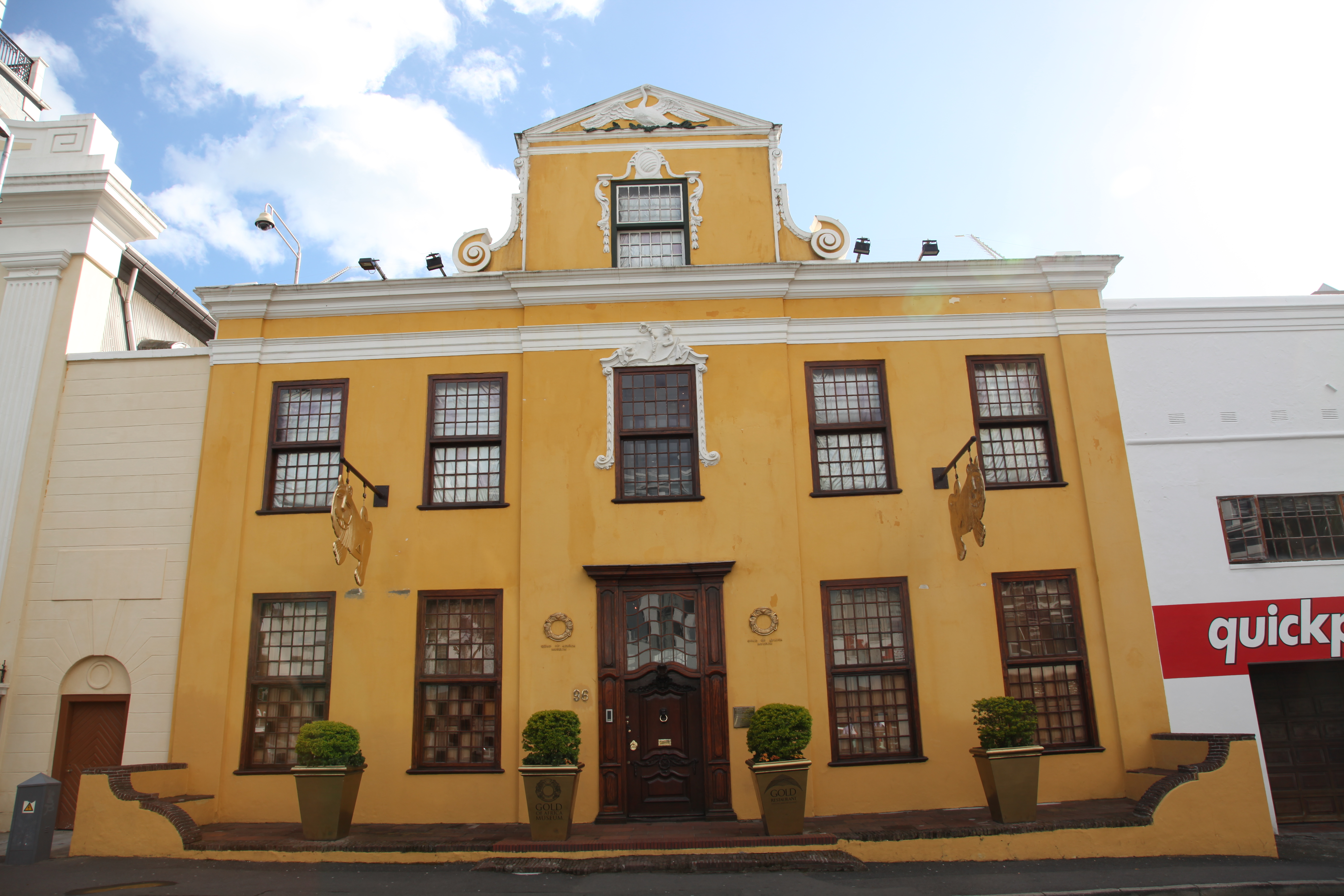

General information
- Address: 96 Strand Street
- Town or city: Cape Town
- Country: South Africa
- Year(s) built: 1781

Technical details
- Floor count: 2

Design and construction
- Architect(s): Louis Michel Thibault

The Martin Melck House (Afrikaans: Martin Melck-huis) on 96 Strand Street and the Kostershuis on 100 Strand Street, on either side of the Lutheran Church in Cape Town, are both national heritage sites of South Africa.

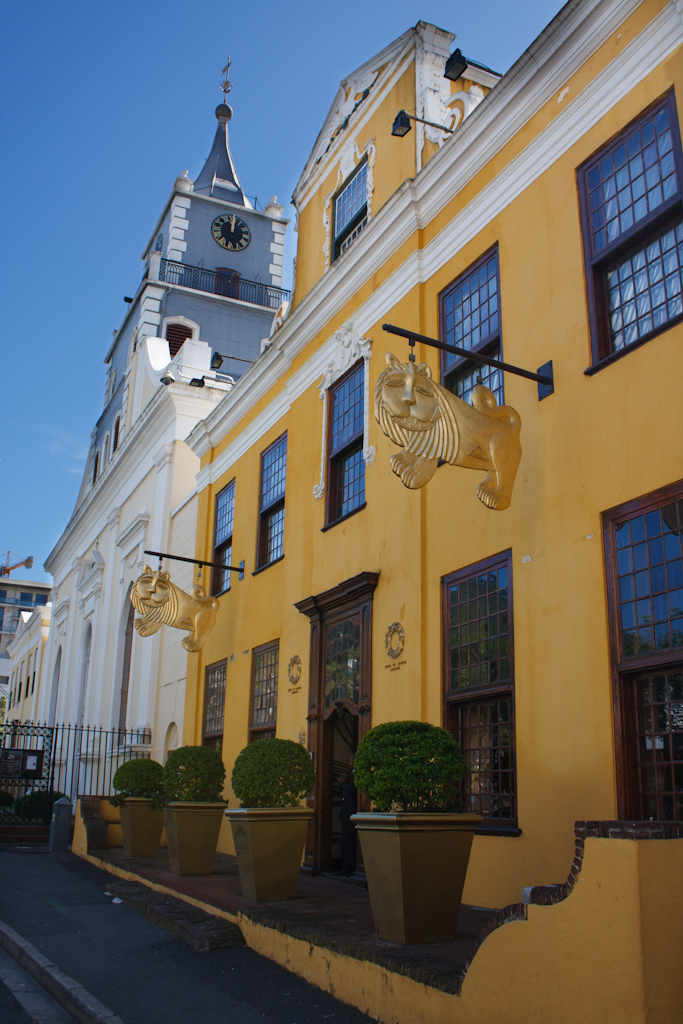
The Martin Melck House.

With the building of the Lutheran church, Martin Melck, a German immigrant whose business success and advantageous marriage rendered him the wealthiest man in Cape Colony in the 18th century, lent part of his property on the east side of the church for a parsonage. He donated the property to the congregation in the end, and in 1781, after Melck's death, construction began on the house. Louis Michel Thibault was probably the original architect. Anton Anreith is generally considered to have been responsible for the stained-glass windows, the swan in the gable, and the engravings on the front door. The building is influenced by French Renaissance architecture. It is also unique in that the attic (a "belvedere") had four windows, at the time giving a wide view of the city and Table Bay. Spacious rooms, paved entryways, African teak floors on the ground floor and Real yellowwood floors on the top floor, African teak beams over the living room, and a courtyard make it a distinctive structure.

Until 1891, it served as the parsonage for the church. In 1929, there was talk of demolition, but conservationists and the wider community saved it through intensive renovation. From 1932 on, it was named the Martin Melck House, earning the distinction of a national monument in 1936, and it was used by cultural groups in the city. Around 1975 an antique shop operated there. Shortly after 2000, it was home to a museum of gold art, a souvenir shop, a restaurant, and a goldsmith's studio. The museum focuses on 19th- and 20th-century gold works from Mali, Senegal, Ghana, and the Ivory Coast. The Golden Lion is the highlight of the collection and also serves as an emblem of the museum. It is exhibited in the attic.

On the corner of Buitengracht and Strand Streets is the Kostershuis, declared a national monument in 1949. This house was originally built from 1779 to 1783. 100 Strand Street in Cape Town was the traditional address of the Dutch Consulate General in the city.

== Gallery ==
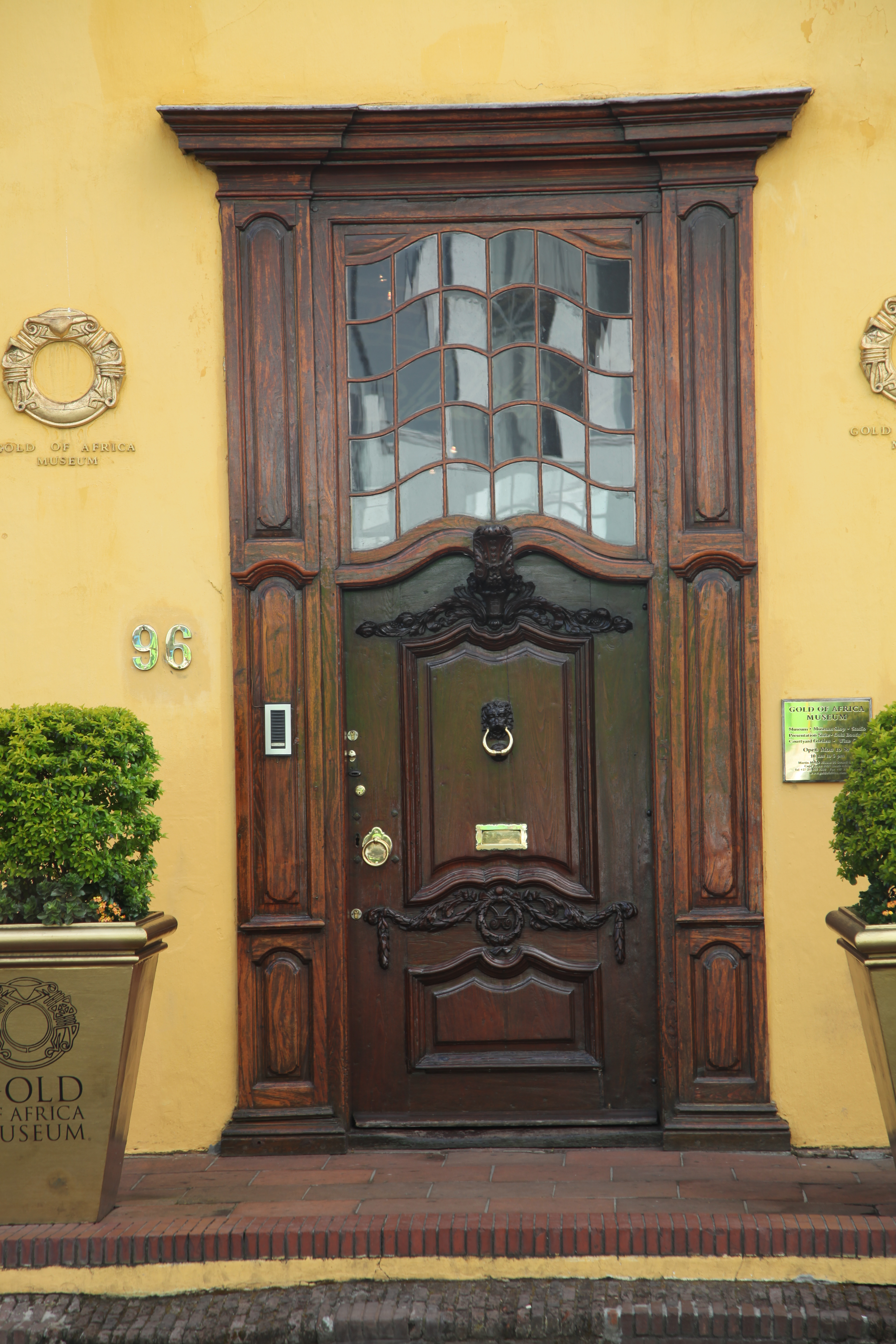
The door by Anton Anreith

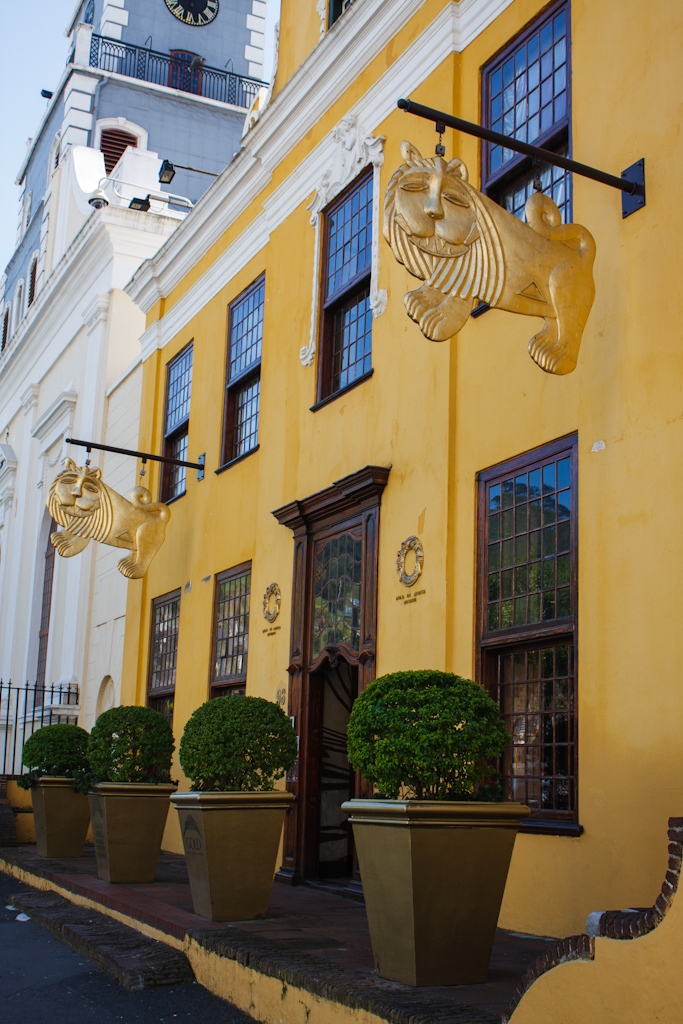

== Sources ==
- Oberholster, J.J. Die Historiese Monumente van Suid-Afrika. Cape Town: Kultuurstigting Rembrandt van Rijn vir Die Raad vir Nasionale Gedenkwaardighede, 1972. ISBN 0-620-00191-7.
