= Pretoria Art Museum =

- Pretoriase Kunsmuseum
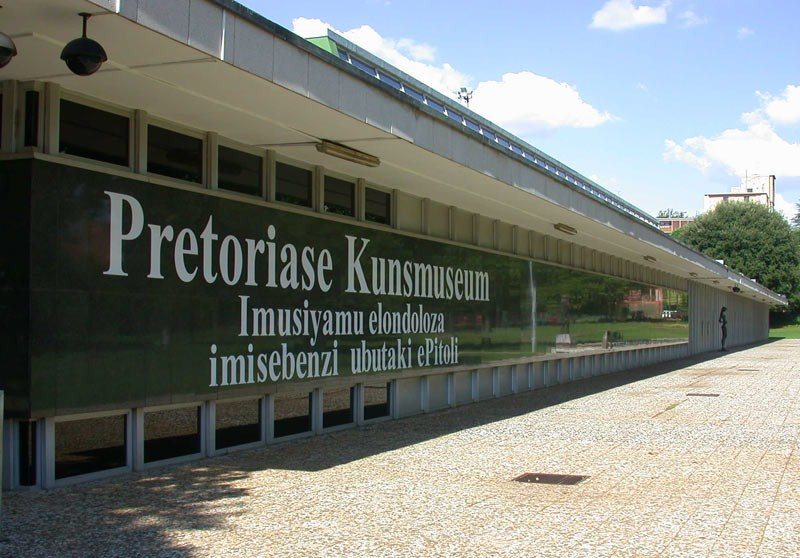
- Multilingual sign at the Pretoria Art Museum

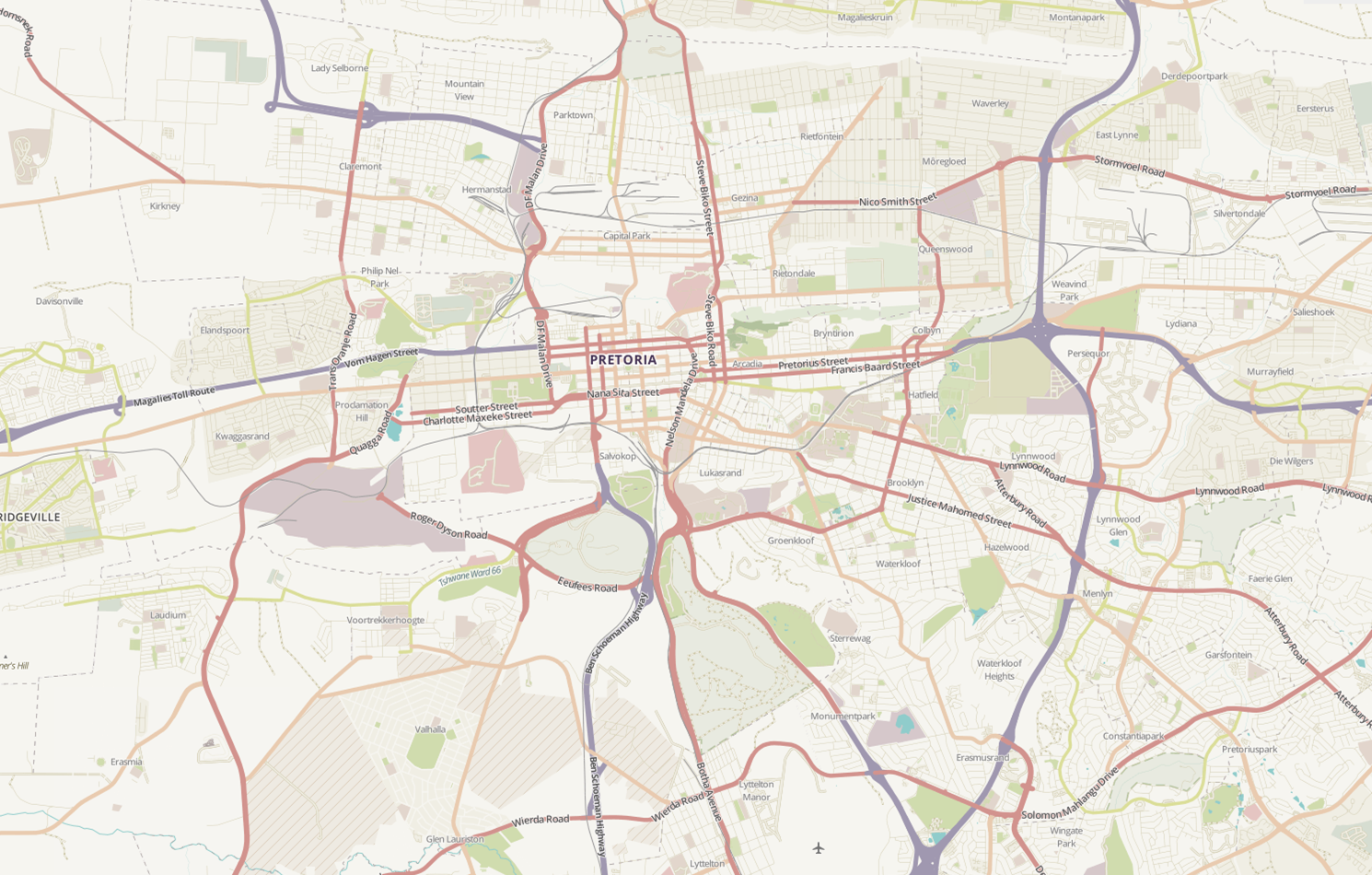
- Location within Pretoria Location within Gauteng Location within South Africa
- Established: 1964
- Location: Pretoria, South Africa
- Coordinates: 25.747°S 28.213°E
- Type: Art museum
- Director: Dirk Oegema
- Curator: Hannelie du Plessis
- Parking: On site (no charge)
- Website: www.pretoriaartmuseum.co.za

The Pretoria Art Museum is an art gallery located in Arcadia, Pretoria, South Africa. The museum in Arcadia Park occupies an entire city block bounded by Park, Wessels, Schoeman and Johann Streets.

The Pretoria Art Museum was established to house the City Council of Pretoria's Art Collection, built up since the 1930s. The collection received an early windfall in 1932 when Lady Michaelis bequeathed a large number of artworks to the city council after the death of her husband, Sir Max Michaelis. The collection consisted mainly of 17th-century work of the "North Dutch school". (Note: The Pretoria Art Museum appears to be the only institution that uses this phrase to describe the "Dutch Masters".) South African works included pieces by Henk Pierneef, Pieter Wenning, Frans Oerder, Anton van Wouw and Irma Stern. The collection was originally housed in the Town Hall. As South African museums in Cape Town and Johannesburg already had good collections of 17th-, 18th- and 19th-century European art, it was decided to focus on compiling a representative collection of South African art.

Aside from these artists, work by Pieter Hugo Naudé, Maggie Laubser and others was acquired. The purchase of international work was focused on more affordable graphics prints from Europe and USA. More recently there was greater emphasis on contemporary South African art and building a more representative historical collection also traditional arts and new-media. After the death of the sculptor Lucas Sithole 1994, half of his unfinished work by Haenggi Foundation was donated to the museum after documented by art historian Elza Miles. The South African collection now includes work by Gerard Sekoto and Judith Mason. Since the mid-1990s, the New Signatures competition is also held at the Pretoria Art Museum.

== History ==
The Pretoria City Council in 1954 decided that a building was needed to house the art collection. The firm of architects Burg, Lodge and Burg and W.G. McIntosh and the builder J. Zylstra (Pty) Ltd was appointed. The curator of the Johannesburg Art Museum, Anton Hendriks in an advisory capacity, and the city clerk of Pretoria, Henry Preiss, was the driving force behind the project; in 1956 he was on holiday in Europe on tour, where he studied art museums studied.

Building began on 26 January 1962 and the cornerstone was laid on 19 October 1962 by the then Prime Minister Dr HF Verwoerd and the mayor of Pretoria, Councillor E. Smith. The building of concrete and glass was completed over 18 months at a cost of R400,000. The design in the modern International Style design and technical innovations feasible at that time were used. The museum was officially inaugurated on 20 May 1964 by the new mayor of Pretoria, Dr PJ van der Walt. The first curator of the new Pretoria Art Museum, Dr. Albert Werth, was appointed early in 1963 and until his retirement in 1991 was director of the art museum.

Additional exhibit space was created in 1975 with the creation of secretion of an open area between the entrance and the East Gallery. It was constructed in 1988 and again in 1999 upgraded, in the latter case in preparation for the international exhibition, Leonardo da Vinci: scientist, inventor, artist. An image Garden is also on the stage, was added to the museum.

== See also ==
- List of museums in South Africa
