= Walter Battiss =

South African painter (1906–1982)

- Self portrait
- Born: Walter Whall Battiss; 6 January 1906; Somerset East, South Africa
- Died: 20 August 1982 (aged 76); Port Shepstone, South Africa
- Known for: Painting

Olympic medal record

Art competition
Bronze medal – third place	1948 London	Engravings and etchings

Walter Whall Battiss (6 January 1906 – 20 August 1982) was a South African artist, also known as the creator of the "Fook Island" concept.

== Early life ==
Battiss was born into an English Methodist family in the Karoo town of Somerset East. He first became interested in archaeology and tribal art as a young boy after moving to Koffiefontein in 1917. In 1919 the Battiss family settled in Fauresmith where he completed his education, matriculating in 1923. In 1924 he became a clerk in the Magistrates Court in Rustenburg. His formal art studies started in 1929 at the Witwatersrand Technical College (drawing and painting), followed by the Johannesburg Training College (a Teacher's Diploma) and etching lessons. Battiss continued his studies while working as a magistrate's clerk, and finally obtained his bachelor's degree in Fine Arts at University of South Africa at the age of 35.

== Career ==
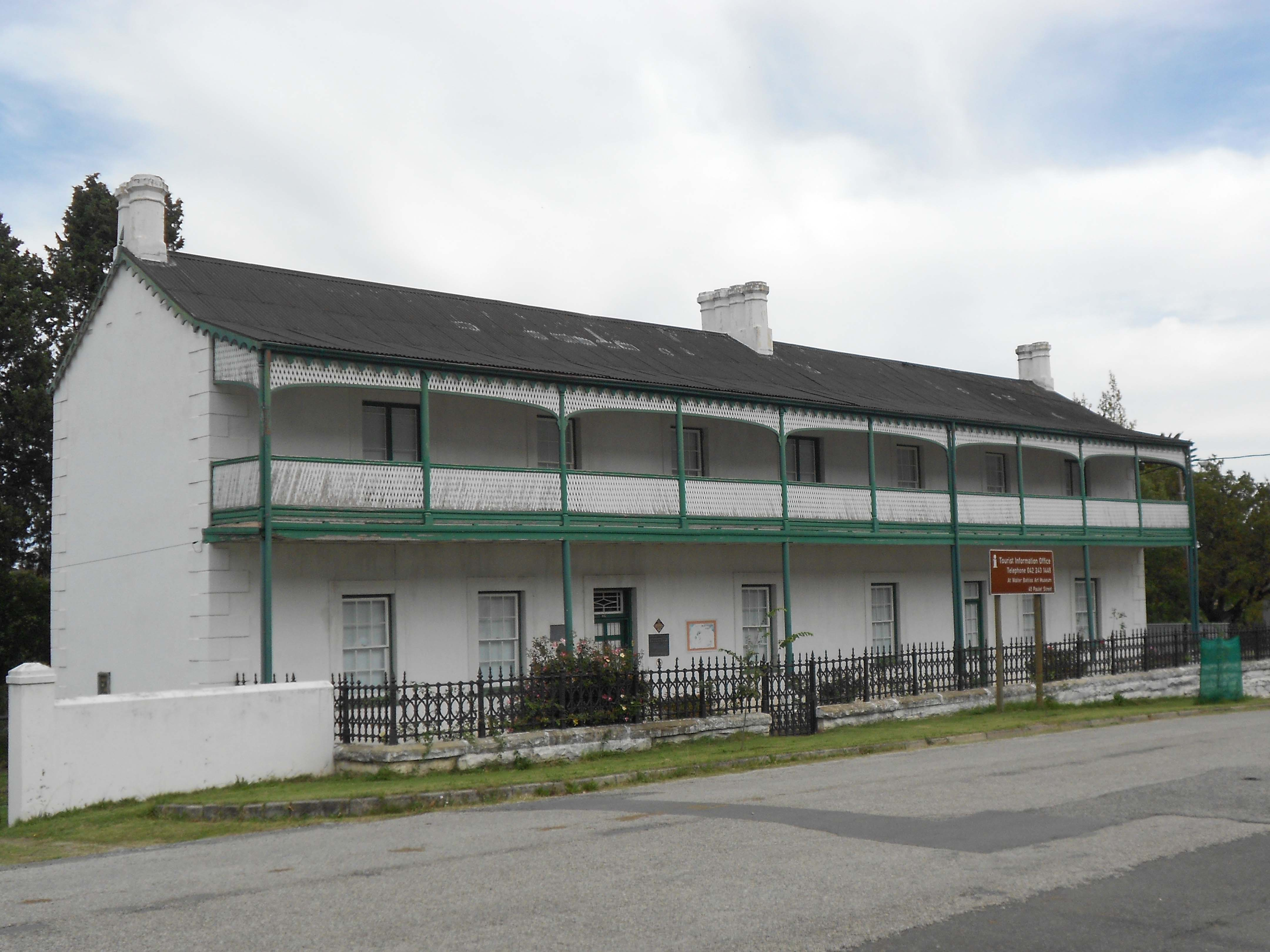
Walter Battiss Art Museum, 45 Paulet Street, Somerset East

Battiss was a founding member of the New Group, a pioneering collective of South African artists established in 1937/1938. The New Group also formed loose friendships with recognized contemporary European and American artists. He was unique among New Group members as he was tasked with inviting special guest artists from the then Transvaal, such as Gerard Sekoto and Patrick Pat Hart, and unique in the sense that he was from what were then regarded as the colonies and in that he had not studied in either Europe or North America. In fact, in 1938 he visited Europe for the first time. The following year, he published his first book, The Amazing Bushman. His interest in rock art had a very profound impact on his ideas, regarding San painting as an important art form. He was also influenced by African cultural Ndebele beadwork and generally by pre-Islamic cultures and calligraphy.

In 1949 he befriended Picasso who would have an influence on his style.

He visited Greece in 1966-1968 and the Seychelles in 1972, which inspired his make-believe Fook Island.

Battiss published nine books, wrote many articles and founded the periodical "De Arte". He taught art at Pretoria Boys High School from 1936 for most of the next 30 years and at the Pretoria Art Centre, of which was the principal from 1953 to 1958. He also taught at UNISA where he became Professor of Fine Art in 1964 and retired in 1971. In 1973 he was awarded a D.Litt. et Phil. (honoris causa) from UNISA.

In 1981 he donated all his work to the newly opened "Walter Battiss Museum" in his birthplace of Somerset East.

Walter Battiss died of a heart attack in Port Shepstone, KwaZulu-Natal on 20 August 1982.

== Influence ==
Walter Battiss's long career as an artist was devoted to the study of man in his environment; first in the context of Africa and rock art, then, later, in the interpretation of this concept in its broadest sense. His versatility and influence as an innovator and the incentive he provided for many aspiring artists secured him a special place among leading South African artists.

== Fook Island ==
This "island of the imagination" was a materialization of Battiss' philosophy for which he created a map, imaginary people, plants, animals, a history as well as a set of postage stamps, currency, passports and driver's licenses. He created a Fookian language with a full alphabet as well. This utopian 'island' was a composite of the many islands he visited – which included Zanzibar, the Seychelles, Madagascar, Fiji, Hawaii, Samoa, the Greek Isles and the Comores – blended together in his customary imaginative fashion. In Battiss's words, "It is something that does not exist. I thought that I would take an island – the island that is inside all of us. I would turn this island into a real thing ... I would give it a name". Fook was a result of his fertile imagination as well as his opposition to the Conceptualist Art movement of the 1960s and 70s, in Europe and America. The movement espoused that the construction of art was confined to the 'moment' in which it was created. He believed to the contrary that all art exists in the now and this he argued to represent with Fook Island, which was always in the now and always an essential part of reality.

South Africans including actress Janet Suzman, artist (and Battiss protégé) Norman Catherine, writer Esmé Berman and many others embraced the philosophy of Fook Island. The journalist Jani Allan interviewed Battiss in 1982 and also agreed to his request of becoming a 'resident' of the imaginary island.

Battiss's Fookian Driver's License was accepted in America and the colourful pages of his Fookian Passport has official stamps from Australia, Britain and Germany. A Fookian banknote was also exchanged at a Rome airport for $10.
