= Alexis Preller =

Notable South African artist

- Born: 6 September 1911; Pretoria, South Africa
- Died: 13 December 1975 (aged 64); Pretoria, South Africa
- Education: Westminster School of Art; Académie de la Grande Chaumière
- Known for: Painting

Alexis Preller (6 September 1911 – 13 December 1975) was a South African painter. He trained at the Westminster School of Art from which he graduated in 1934 and later at the Académie de la Grande Chaumière in Paris (1937).

He was especially influenced by Vincent van Gogh and Paul Gauguin and visited European galleries and museums to study these artists' works. Elements of Gauguin can be seen in his paintings on South African subjects such as the Garden of Eden (1937). Over time, he developed his own style and his works showed an array of elements from nature, African masks and other African art. One finds this overlay of his personal style on African themes most illuminatingly expressed in works such as Basuto Allegory (1947). Travels in Europe and North Africa gave further expression to his output which became influenced by the frescoes of Piero della Francesca and Egyptian murals. One sees this influence in works such as Hieratic Women (1956).

Preller's style isolated him from the artist related movements of the 20th century, he did not fit into any conventional style of the old school. Although as a native of Pretoria, this didnt happen in South Africa, an exhibition of his works in Cape Town in the late 1960s was well received by art critics. His style was different from others which made it difficult to label him. However, by owning, combining, and transforming all the influences and iconographies throughout his career, Preller developed sophisticated Preller-style, African themed, and created a legacy for the South African art market. Recognition for his work has grown over the past few decades, and the opening of the most recent major exhibition, Africa, the Sun and the Shadows of his works at Johannesburg's Standard Bank Gallery on 13 October 2009.
