= Irma Stern =

South African artist (1894–1966)

- Born: Irma Analize Stern; 2 October 1894; Schweizer-Reneke, Transvaal
- Died: 23 August 1966 (aged 71); Cape Town, South Africa
- Known for: Painting
- Spouse: Johannes Prinz (m. 1926; div. 1934)

Irma Analize Stern (2 October 1894 – 23 August 1966) was a South African artist who achieved national and international recognition in her lifetime.

== Life ==
Stern was born in Schweizer-Reneke, a small town in the Transvaal, to German-Jewish parents. Her father was interned in a concentration camp by the British during the Second Boer War because of his pro-Boer leanings. Irma and her younger brother, Rudi, were thus taken to Cape Town by their mother. In 1901, the family returned to Germany and later would constantly travel between South Africa and Germany. This travel also influenced Irma's development as an artist.

In 1913 Stern studied art in Germany at the Grand-Ducal Saxon Art School, Weimar; in 1914 at the Levin-Funcke Studio and notably from 1917 with Max Pechstein, a founder of the Novembergruppe. Stern was associated with the German Expressionist painters of this period. She held her first exhibition in Berlin in 1919. In 1920 Stern returned to Cape Town with her family, where she was first derided and dismissed as an artist before later becoming an established artist by the 1940s.

In 1926 Stern married Johannes Prinz, her former tutor, who subsequently became professor of German at the University of Cape Town. They were divorced in 1934.

Irma Stern travelled extensively in Europe and explored southern Africa, Zanzibar and the Congo region. These trips provided a wide range of subject matter for her paintings and gave her opportunities to acquire and assemble a collection of artefacts. Stern intended to travel extensively in her lifetime: in 1931 to Madeira; in 1937 and 1938 to Dakar, Senegal; in 1939 and 1945 to Zanzibar; in 1942, 1946, and 1955 to the Congo region; in 1952 to Madeira; in 1952 to Israel; in 1955 to Turkey; in 1960 to Spain; and in 1963 to France. Stern also travelled extensively in South Africa, for example in 1926 to Swaziland and Pondoland, in 1933 to Namaqualand, in 1936 generally, and in 1941 to the Eastern Cape. Stern refused to either travel or exhibit in Germany during the period of the Nazi regime from 1933 to 1945. These expeditions produced a wealth of artistic creativity and energy, as well as two illustrated journals: Congo (1943) and Zanzibar (1948).

== Reception ==
She held almost one hundred solo exhibitions during her lifetime in South Africa and Europe, including Germany, France, Italy, and England. Although accepted in Europe, her work was initially unappreciated in South Africa, where critics derided her early exhibitions in the 1920s with reviews titled such as "Art of Miss Irma Stern – Ugliness as a cult".

The Irma Stern Museum was established in 1971 in the Cape Town house where the artist lived for almost four decades. She moved into The Firs in Rondebosch in 1927 and lived there until her death. Several rooms were furnished as she had arranged them, while upstairs was a commercial gallery used by contemporary South African artists. The museum closed in October 2025. In February 2026, the Norval Foundation opened the first of a four-part exhibition series drawn from the Irma Stern Trust's collection, to run while the trust arranges a new permanent home for the works.

On 8 May 2000, one of her works sold at Sotheby's South Africa in Johannesburg for a record of R1.7 million. However, this record was soon broken when her 1936 Portrait of an Indian woman sold in March 2007 for R6.6 million. Stern's Gladioli was sold for an all-time high of R13.4 million in October 2010 at Strauss & Co. The record sale was soon followed by the sale of Bahora Girl for R26.7 million later that month – both were also records for sales of South African art at the time. A new record was set in March 2011, when her painting, Arab Priest, sold for R34 million at Bonhams, London. In June 2024, at an Aspire Art auction, another work by Stern sold for R5.6 million, though the pre-sale estimate ranged from R6 million to R8 million.

Between 2023 and 2025, two further works by Stern sold for more than R21 million each at Strauss & Co. Children Reading the Koran (1939) sold for R22.3 million on 28 March 2023, then a record for a work of art sold at auction in Africa, and the portrait Malay (Black Headdress) (1946) sold for R21.7 million on 28 October 2025.

On 11 November 2012, Stern's painting Fishing Boats was stolen, along with four other paintings, from a museum in Pretoria. A tip-off led South African police to a cemetery in Port Elizabeth, where they recovered four of the five paintings from under a bench.

From 3 November 2021 to 1 August 2022, the Norval Foundation gallery in Cape Town presented important paintings produced by Irma Stern during her two stays in Zanzibar from 1939 to 1945, and commented on these works as follows:

Her heavily-laden brush deposits swathes of colour and a tracery of mark that evokes at times the sweep and syncopation of Islamic calligraphy. The calligraphy that she encountered in the carved cartouches of the lintels of Zanzibari doors and the Islamic manuscripts which she collected, armed and liberated her mark-making. The boldness of her impasto brushwork results in a tangible embodiment of her sitters and their contexts, such that her decision to frame the works using fragments of Zanzibari doors feels completely in keeping.

— Norval Foundation, Cape Town, The Zanzibari Years: Irma Stern

== Honours ==
In 2024, at the South African Jewish Board of Deputies' 120th anniversary gala dinner, she was honoured among 100 remarkable Jewish South Africans who have contributed to South Africa. The ceremony included speeches from Chief Rabbi Ephraim Mirvis, and Stern was honoured among other artists such as Wolf Kibel.

== Gallery ==
Still life with African pot, Johans Borman Fine Art Gallery, Cape Town 1936

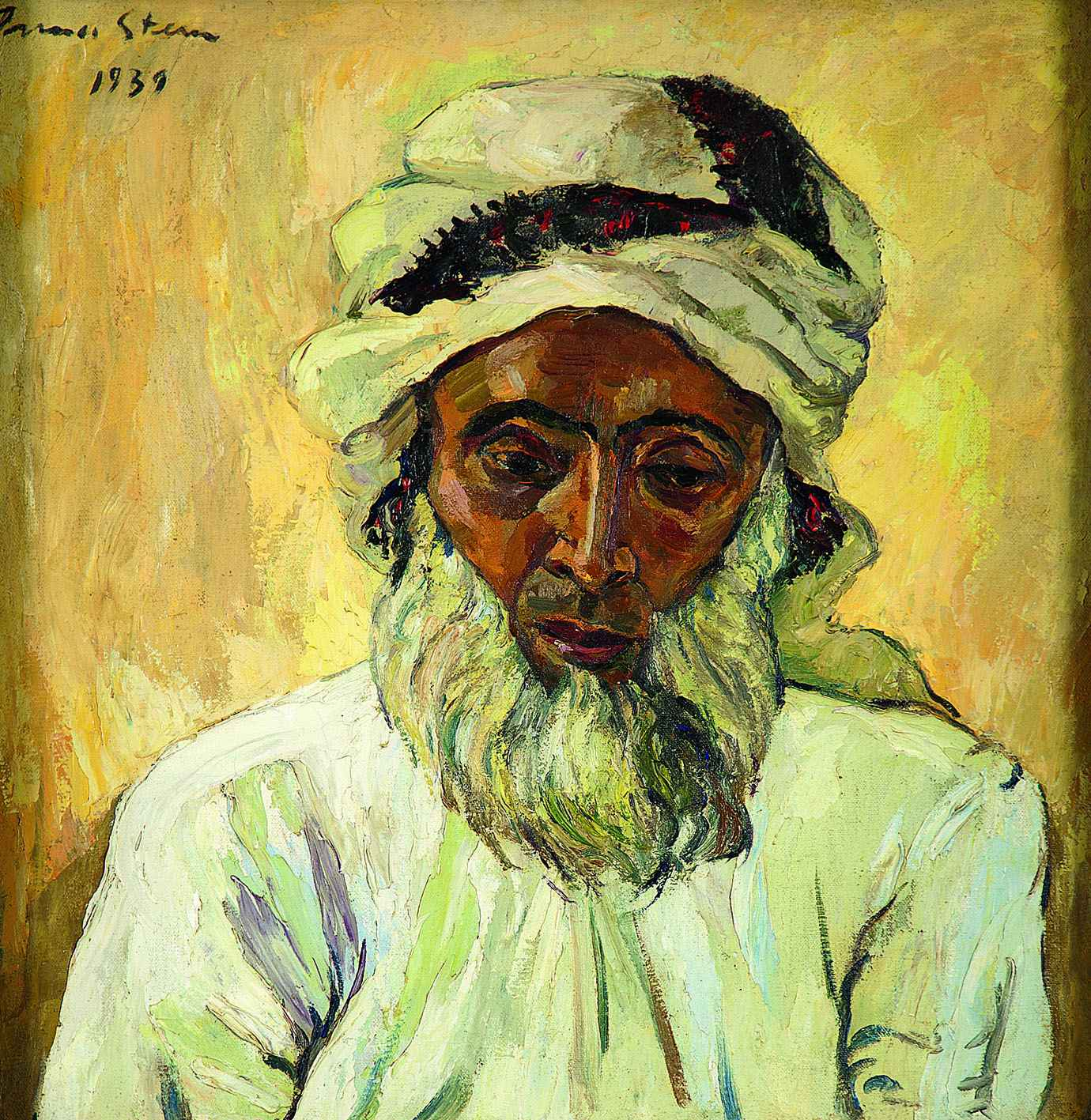
The Arab (1939)

== Bibliography ==
- At home with Irma Stern: A guidebook to the UCT Irma Stern Museum, by Helene Smuts ISBN 978-0-620-39702-5
- Hidden Treasures: Irma Stern – Her Books, Painted Book Covers and Bookplates, by Irene Below ISBN 0-620-26727-5
- Irma Stern: A Feast for the Eye, by Marion Arnold ISBN 0-620-19014-0
- Irma Stern and the Racial Paradox of South African Modern Art: Audacities of Color, by LaNitra M. Berger ISBN 978-1-350-18749-8
- Irma Stern: The Early Years (1894–1933), by Karel Schoeman ISBN 0-86968-112-5
- Paradise, the Journal and Letters (1917–1933) of Irma Stern Edited with a Commentary, by Neville Dubow ISBN 1-874812-08-X
- Remembering Irma: Irma Stern: A Memoir with Letters. ISBN 1-919930-27-2

== See also ==
- Irma Stern Museum
