= Gordon Tomlinson =

Lawyer

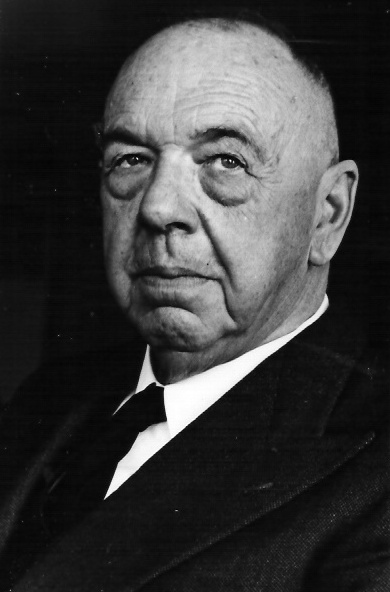
Gordon Tomlinson

Gordon Tomlinson (Swellendam, 6 October 1887 - Vredefort, 6 November 1955) was a lawyer, writer, and champion of Afrikaans.

== Early life ==
Tomlinson was born the third son among thirteen children of Daniel Males Tomlinson and his wife, Aletta Amelia Rothmann, oldest sister of Afrikaans writer M.E.R. Tomlinson; Gordon's was an older brother of Prof. Frederick R. Tomlinson, agricultural economist and chairman of the famed Tomlinson commission that authored the Tomlinson Report which failed to persuade the South African government to expand bantustans to accommodate population growth. After graduating from school in Swellendam, Gordon Tomlinson went to Victoria College in Stellenbosch, where that September he also enrolled as a clerk in the law firm of Paul D. cluver. At the end of 1908, he passed his attorney and notary exam, and afterwards he practiced as an attorney for two years in Trompsburg and Bethulie. In 1911, he returned to Stellenbosch to study theology. However, he only completed his first- and second-year admission exams and did not finish the program. From 1915 onward, he returned to the legal profession, practicing first in Heilbron and settling in 1917 in Vredefort.

Tomlison married Moritza Maria Gertenbach of Grootfontein, Philippolis, and the marriage produced one son and four daughters. Tomlinson was married by Dr. Tobie Muller, and the morning before the marriage, they translated the form into Afrikaans.

== Student life ==
Tomlinson played an active part in the cultural life of the Stellenbosch student community. He soon gained recognition for his performance in the Debating Society and the publication of his series of sketches named "Aasvoël" ("Buzzard") published in the South African News. After only two months at Stellenbosch, he was already editing the Stellenbosch Students Quarterly. Tomlinson's student society posts, rarely equaled in breadth before or since, included on occasion editor of the student newspaper, chairman of the student council, editor of Ons Moedertaal, and chairman of the Stellenbosch chapter of Afrikaanse Taalvereniging (ATV), the national language society. In addition, he also acted in plays.

== Language battle ==
During his first stay in Stellenbosch, he met Prof. T.B. (Tobie) Muller and they formed a close friendship. Both were fierce champions of Afrikaans, founding the Stellenbosch ATV branch in 1907. It was during Tomlinson's second stay in Stellenbosch, from 1911 onward, that the organization mounted the struggle for the language in earnest. Muller and Tomlinson were joined in a troika by J.J. Smith, together spearheading the organization of the second Afrikaans language movement. They edited Ons Moedertaal, the journal of the ATV, until 1915, when it was merged into Die Huisgenoot.

This journal published Tomlinson's early writing. Notable poems of his appeared in it periodically, and he also wrote a serial that would be published in 1917 under the title Deur die smeltkroes. Although it won the consolation prize from the Suid-Afrikaanse Akademie vir Wetenskap en Kuns, harsh reception by critics discouraged Tomlinson from writing further literature. Nevertheless, he published two more works of cultural and historical significance. In collaboration with Dr. B.B. Keet, he wrote the biography Tobie Muller, ’n inspirasie vir Jong Suid-Afrika (Cape Town, 1925) and the autobiography Herinneringe van ’n Jong Turk (Cape Town, 1956).

The activities of the ATV in Stellenbosch culminated in a conference on 14 August 1914, a high point for Muller, Smith, and Tomlinson's activism in which the Dutch Reformed Church in South Africa (NGK) embraced Afrikaans as an official language on par with Dutch. The Church committed to translating a Bible into Afrikaans to that end. These decisions created such a storm of protest that the trio had to meet outside the ATV, which they did under Tomlinson's chairmanship with Keet, Smith, and Muller as keynote speakers. After the conference, opposition waned as the "church, the university, and Parliament," in Tomlinson's words, "bowed to the inevitable."

== Public life ==
During his later career, Tomlinson participated very actively in public life. During his stay in Heilbron, he fostered the Helpmekaar movement, and in Vredefort, he ran an expanded legal practice and a large farm, and served for fifteen years as mayor of the town. He was an active member of the Ossewabrandwag, and in 1941 served as an honorary captain under Dr. Johannes Van Rensburg. He also assisted Afrikaners in improving their economic lot, serving as chairman of the Vredefort-Handelshuis Beperk and Trans-Oranje Beperk, and also served as a director for Askor and Afrikaanse Pers Beperk.

Tomlinson maintained a remarkable art collection, including works by Hugo Naudé, Pieter Wenning, J.E.A. Volschenk, J.H. Pierneef, Erich Mayer, Tinus de Jongh, and W.H. Coetzer. Uniquely, his collection covered a period stretching from 1906 to 1955. From an early age, he was interested in painting himself, and produced good-quality work under the tutelage of G.P. Canitz.

Although a mighty champion of Afrikaans, Tomlinson translated many of the works of the great English-language writers as well as classical masterworks. In this respect, his firm command of Latin stood him in good stead.

== Retirement and death ==
He loved nature, and loved exploring the wilds of the Boland, especially around Hermanus and Swellendam. The quiet surroundings of Vredefort, between the Vaal River and the Renoster River, greatly enchanted him, and he enjoyed angling there. He died in 1955 in Vredefort, where a street bears his name.

== Sources ==
- Suid-Afrikaanse Biografiese Woordeboek, 1st ed. 1981, vol. IV p. 691
