= Moses Kottler =

South African painter and sculptor

- Born: Moses Kottler ca. 1890; Joniskis, Russian Empire
- Died: 1977; Johannesburg; Transvaal, South Africa
- Education: Bezalel Academy of Art and Design, Jerusalem (1911–1912)
- Known for: Sculpting, Painting
- Notable work: Small Coloured Girl (1917), oil on cardboard, 42 x 35.5 cm, Johannesburg Art Gallery; D. C. Boonzaier (1918), oil on canvas, 45 x 34.5, South African National Gallery; Meidjie (1926), cypress wood, 156 cm (including base), Johannesburg Art Gallery
- Movement: Cubism, Symbolism, German Expressionism, Cape Impressionism, New Group
- Awards: Medal for Sculpture (1962); Suid-Afrikaanse Akademie vir Wetenskap en Kuns

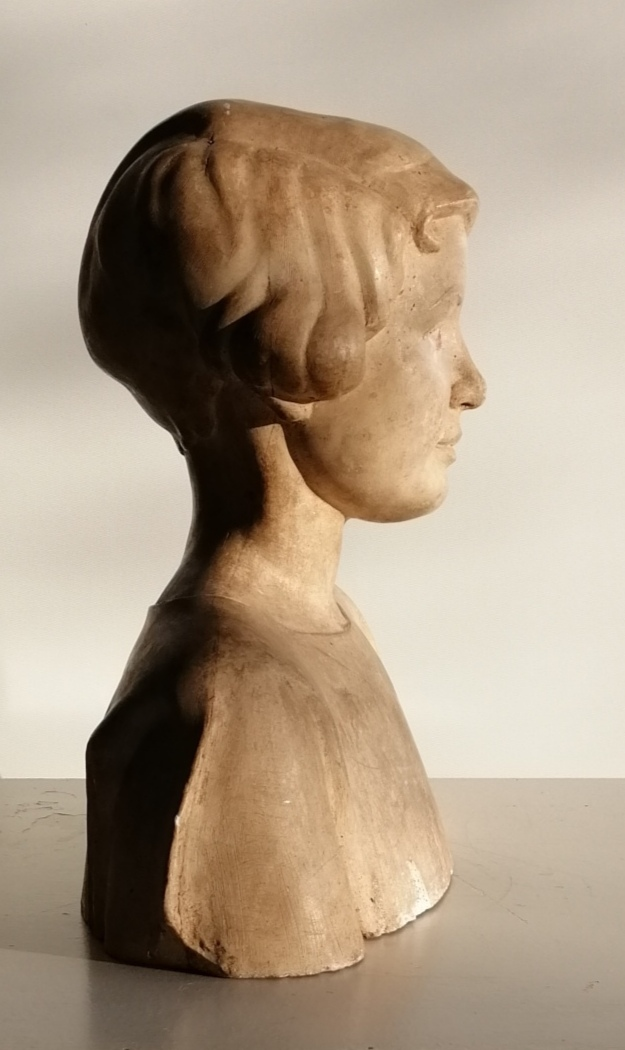
Moses Kottler "Irene"

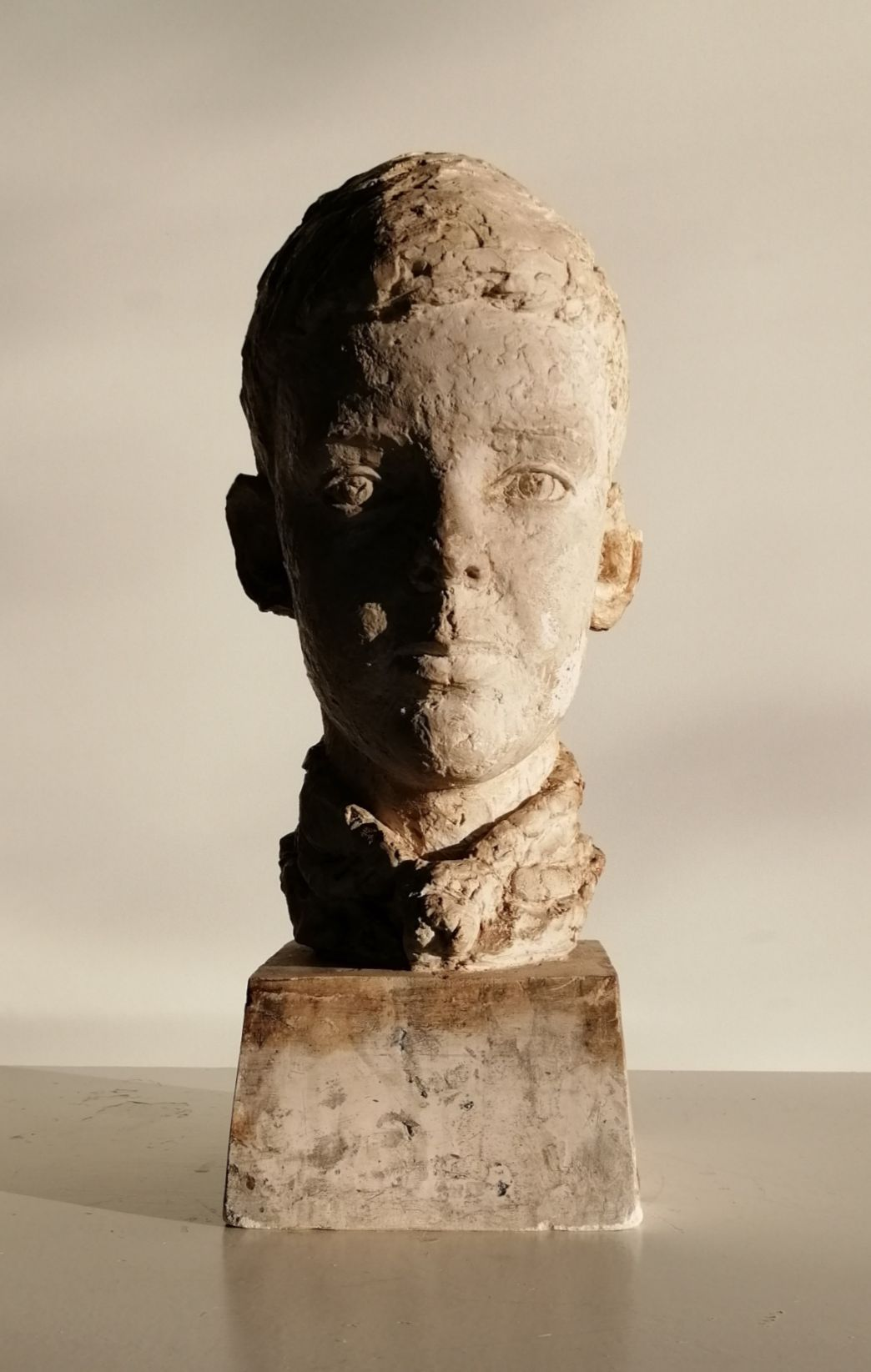
Moses Kottler "Frank Wunder"

Moses Kottler (1896–1977) was a South African painter and sculptor. He is widely regarded, along with Anton van Wouw and Lippy Lipshitz, as one of the most important South African sculptors. This triumvirate had the distinction of also having excelled at using pictorial media; Lipshitz with monotypes and Van Wouw in painting and drawing. Kottler's work in oils earned him additional consideration as a painter.

== Early life and education ==
Moses Kottler, nicknamed Moshe, was the eighth child of Joseph Kottler and Zirla Solin. His father was a trader of agricultural goods and their home – opposite a synagogue – seems to have been prosperous by the standards of Jews in Czarist Russia. Their home language was Yiddish, but Moses also gained command of German and Russian during his youth. He displayed manual dexterity and superior drawing ability from an early age. Moses' remarkable manual dexterity soon came to the attention of an uncle, Haim Israel Sacks, who was a leading Zionist. He took a photograph of a snowman Moses had created, and showed it to a sculptor Ilya Ginzburg while at a Zionist congress in Vilnius. Ginzburg advised that the boy be trained as a sculptor.

Discrimination against Jews, compulsory military service and the twin booms of the Witwatersrand Gold Rush (1886), and Second Ostrich Boom (1860–1914) sparked emigration of Jewish families to South Africa. By 1909, only Joseph, Zirla and their three youngest children were left of the Kottler family in Russia. The rest had left for South Africa. Moses was sent to the Bezalel Academy of Art and Design in Jerusalem, to study under Boris Schatz. Six months later, in 1910, the remaining family left for Oudtshoorn, South Africa.

Kottler's experience at the Bezalel School was a disappointment; he received no training in sculpture or painting at all. Instead, he used the time to train himself and started painting in oils during a visit to Tel Aviv. Little more than six months of training at Bezalel were enough to convince him to continue his studies at the Munich Art Academy. After submission of some drawings, he was accepted at the academy, but unable to secure a place in the sculpture continued with drawing and painting. He had Carl Johann Becker-Gundahl and Hugo von Habermann as his professors.

Munich, in the years preceding the First World War, was the city of the Blaue Reiter, Wassily Kandinsky, Franz Marc, August Macke, Paul Klee and Alexej von Jawlensky. Kottler had occasion to experience the work of these and other artists exhibiting in Europe's art second city. In the middle of 1913, Kottler left for the capital of European art: Paris. He took a room on the Rue Servandoni, near the church of St. Sulpice, with its murals by Eugène Delacroix. Later he would move to the Passage de Dantzig near La Ruche (the Beehive) where artists like Marc Chagall, Jacques Lipchitz, Chaïm Soutine and Ossip Zadkine stayed. He also befriended Chana Orloff, Henri Epstein and sculptor Josef Tchaikow. Nearby Montparnasse was the centre of the artistic world. During this time in Paris, he was greatly influenced by the works of Rodin and especially Maillol, whose studio he visited.

The outbreak of the First World War in August 1914 forced Kottler back to South Africa, settling in Oudtshoorn, where his extensive family now had farms and businesses. He occupied himself with his art on the farms Oude Muragie and Middelplaats, modelling and painting the rural population; producing 12 paintings and nine sculptures in the period 1915 to 1916. At least three sculptures and two paintings were shown at the exhibition of the South African Society of Artists in Cape Town on 10 April 1916, meeting with favourable responses from W. J. Makin, writing for the Cape Argus, and Louis Herrman, writing for The Cape.

== Cape Town December 1916 – May 1929 ==
Moses Kottler arrived in Cape Town in December 1916 to settle permanently. Conditions in the art world were bleak, with no art dealers, galleries, collectors with serious intent and, for the sculptor, foundries for bronze casting. The most influential figures in painting were J. S. Morland, Crosland Robinson, Constance Penstone, Gwelo Goodman and Edward Roworth. They were traditionalists, set against the avant garde art movements emerging in France and Germany. As late as 1940, Edward Roworth openly praised Adolf Hitler's suppression of Modern Art in Germany. The South African Society of Artists was the most influential organisation at the time. It was founded on 26 September 1902 and held its first exhibition at the Drill Hall, Cape Town at the end of that year. The membership count in 1917 was 121, including Hendrik Pierneef, Anton van Wouw, Nita Spilhaus, Ruth Prowse, Florence Zerffi and Moses Kottler, who had joined that year.

In January 1917, Kottler looked up D. C. Boonzaier, the cartoonist and art collector, on the advice of Nita Spilhaus, but was unable to show him anything more than photographs. On 7 February 1917, Boonzaier, Pieter Wenning, Florence Zerffi and Nita Spilhaus attended the opening of the South African Society of Artists exhibition in the Minor City Hall, Cape Town. This was to be the first occasion Boonzaier had to view Kottler's work and his diary contains glowing praise of what he saw. From then on Boonzaier and Kottler were frequently in each other's company, and Kottler completing a portrait of Boonzaier, completed on 4 April 1917.

In early 1917 Kottler was living in abject poverty, for want of commissions, and frequently unable to buy food. He lived and worked in the Athenian Chambers in Shortmarket Street, in a room D. C. Boonzaier described as cheerless surroundings. Circumstances improved slightly when Kottler was commissioned to illustrate a Nationale Pers children's book Wonderstories, for which he received £20. This was followed on 16 July 1917 by a commission to paint the portrait of Cecil James Sibbett, naturalist, President of the South African Botanical Society, and later chairman of the board of Trustees of the South African National Gallery. This portrait was destroyed when Sibbett's house, Mount Rhodes in Hout Bay, burnt down in 1936.

During 1917, Kottler was occupied with painting: portraits of Louis Herrman, A. Z. Berman and others, still lives and townscapes of Cape Town and the Malay Quarter, one of which was reproduced in Die Huisgenoot, an Afrikaans weekly magazine, in April 1918.

Art critic Bernard Lewis procured a commission for Kottler to paint the portrait of Jakob Elisa de Villiers (Oom Japie Helpmekaar), a wealthy farmer of Paarl, which was completed by 25 December 1917. On 11 February 1918, he finished the portrait of Ethel Friedlander, which he later destroyed, but can still be seen in the background of a self-portrait done around the same time. In March, he completed a portrait of Paulette Lowenstein, another portrait of D. C. Boonzaier and a bust of D'Arcy Cartwright. By 21 May, he completed a bust of Freda Versfeld.

On 5 December 1918, Kottler left for Oudtshoorn; a visit which had been greatly delayed by the influenza epidemic raging there. He returned exactly two months later, on 5 February 1919. On 13 April 1919, while visiting Bernard Lewis and his wife at the Vineyard Hotel, Newlands, he met Anton van Wouw for the first time. This was the second fortuitous meeting instigated by Lewis and not the last. On 26 April 1919, Lewis procured a commission for portrait paintings of J. I. Marais, first chancellor of the newly established Stellenbosch University, and Reverend J. H. Neethling, for which he was to be paid £180. The portraits were formally handed over to the Stellenbosch University Council on 23 August 1919. By 11 June 1920, Kottler finished a portrait bust of Ernest Oppenheimer, which Oppenheimer would have cast in Europe, and for which Kottler was paid £100. About the same time, he moved to Wynberg House, the home of Aletta Johanna, Lady de Villiers, widow of Chief Justice John Henry de Villiers. He also developed a furious passion for collecting Eastern Art; a passion he shared with Boonzaier.

Between 14 December 1920 and 4 January 1921, Kottler staged his first Exhibition of Sculpture, held at Cape Town City Hall and opened by Sir Carruthers Beattie. Painter Gwelo Goodman bought a bust of Ruth Prowse for £150 (haggled down from £300). Other than that, he only sold two woodcuts and a pencil drawing. The exhibition was not a success, perhaps because no paintings were shown. Kottler had, however, decided to make his career as a sculptor and very seldom painted after March 1918, never again after June 1924.

=== Major works ===
"I consider him the greatest artist in S.A., no comparison with any other – my own humble personality included" —Pieter Wenning (1919)

On 9 April 1921, Kottler finished the bust of General Christiaan de Wet, for which he had travelled to Klipfontein, the General's farm in the Orange Free State. The undertaking, with the General in ill health, had consumed twelve days but left a lasting impression on Kottler of the character of the guerrilla leader.

In June 1921, he finished a bust of Lord de Villiers, of which bronze casts were kept in the Supreme Court, Cape Town and in the Court of Appeal, Bloemfontein. In November, he finished the bronze bust of Max Michaelis, now in the garden of the Old Town House, Cape Town.

On 13 April 1922, he departed for London and Paris, returning on 1 January 1923. On 17 April, he was to complete a bust of Gregoire Boonzaier. In November, he completed a commissioned bust of William Philip Schreiner, and, in December, one of Lady de Villiers. In early 1924, he turned up the unusual commission for a death mask and bust of John Charles Molteno Jr., the member of parliament. On 15 June, he showed D. C. Boonzaier a self-portrait, which he later gave to Bernard Lewis. This portrait, along with a landscape of Wynberg, were the last paintings Kottler would complete in his Cape period.

The year 1925 found Kottler financially more secure, as is evidenced by him buying a motor car in July. In December he completed a bust of Prof. P. J. G. de Vos, Chancellor of Stellenbosch University. In May 1926 he started with a bust of J. B. M. Hertzog, then Prime Minister of the Union of South Africa, the sittings taking place at Groote Schuur. The bust was cast in bronze in London and presented on 30 April 1927. In October 1926, he is busy on Meidjie one of the most famous Kottler sculptures, now in the Johannesburg Art Gallery.

More important commission were to follow: in 1928, busts of the Earl of Athlone, V. S. Srinivasa Sastri, General Louis Botha and Sir George Edward Cory; in 1929, mayor of Cape Town, Hyman Liberman. In June 1928, he married Eva Goldberg.

== Later career ==
In January 1929, Kottler announced his intention to leave the Union of South Africa, provoking a furore in the Cape Times, Die Burger and The Cape, all local newspapers. On 10 May 1929, they sailed for Europe, only to return in 1932.

On his return to South Africa in 1932, Kottler settled in Johannesburg. He joined the New Group, served on the advisory committee of the Johannesburg Art Gallery between 1956 and 1965, was awarded Medal for Sculpture (1962) by the Suid-Afrikaanse Akademie vir Wetenskap en Kuns and, in 1974/5 was honoured with a Prestige Retrospective Exhibition by the Pretoria Art Museum, South African National Gallery and Johannesburg Art Gallery.

== Public collections ==
- South African National Gallery, Cape Town
- National Portrait Gallery, London
- Johannesburg Art Gallery, Johannesburg
- MuseuMAfricA, Johannesburg
