= Bernard Lewis (critic) =

South African art critic (1870–1956)

Bernard Lewis (20 May 1870 – 5 February 1956) was a Jewish South African art critic, journalist, and author.

== Life & work ==
He pursued his education at the University of Darmstadt and the South African College School. He cultivated lifelong friendships with the most prominent artists in Cape Town, foremost among whom was D. C. Boonzaier. The great South African artists Pieter Wenning, Moses Kottler, and Gregoire Boonzaier were in his close circle of friends. He served as a trustee of the South African National Art Gallery and published many essays in the South African Nation, Die Huisgenoot, Die Burger, The Cape Argus and The Cape Times, He also was a translator, creating the first translation into English of a piece of Afrikaans literature: Uit Oerwoud en Vlakte by "Sangiro" (Andries Albertus Pienaar) which he rendered as The Adventures of a Lion Family). He also wrote several children's books in Afrikaans under the pen name "Helen Blackmore".

== Sources ==
- Standard Encyclopaedia of Southern Africa, vol. 6, p. 603
- Scholtz, J. du P. 1979. Oor skilders en skrywers, p. 74
