= Johannes du Plessis Scholtz =

South African philologist, art historian, and art collector

Johannes du Plessis Scholtz (14 May 1900 – 26 January 1990) was a South African philologist, art historian, and art collector.

== Scholarly life ==
Scholtz studied first at the University of Stellenbosch, completing an M.A. in 1920. He then took a job assisting the philologist J. J. Smith in editing Die Huisgenoot, but he moved shortly thereafter over to the Nasionale Pers to be head of the publication department. In 1924 he went to Amsterdam and in 1927 he received a PhD from the Gemeentelijke Universiteit. He returned to the Netherlands for two years (1929–1931) to pursue further studies in Dutch dialectology and structural linguistics, studies which formed the foundation of his later work in Afrikaans.

Upon returning to Stellenbosch, he worked again for J. J. Smith on the Woordeboek van die Afrikaanse Taal. He also worked under C. G. N. de Vooys at the University of Utrecht on his dissertation Die Afrikaner en Sy Taal, 1806-1875, for which he received the Hertzog Prize for scholarly prose (what is more, the award had existed until then; it was expressly created in order to honor him with it). In 1934 he accepted a lecturership at the University of Cape Town teaching Dutch and Afrikaans. In 1950 he became head of the Department of Dutch and Afrikaans and Hofmeyr-Professor, and in 1965 retired as emeritus professor to pursue linguistic and artistic scholarship without the pressure of university administration. After his retirement he received honorary doctorates from the University of Stellenbosch and the University of the Orange Free State. His final commemoration came in the form of a Festschrift entitled Dietse Studies, given on the occasion of his 65th birthday with contributions from the foremost South African scholars of the time, as well as notable Dutch scholars such as C. B. van Haeringen.

While others in South Africa, and to a lesser extent the Netherlands and Belgium, were still discussing origin of Afrikaans at a theoretical level only, Scholtz had been collecting and analyzing as much data as were available. He steered clear of theorizing, and his work was based on two great linguistic schools of the time: Leonard Bloomfield's descriptive linguistics, and N. S. Trubetzkoy's structural linguistics. Scholtz was the first in South Africa to employ these approaches and in so doing revolutionized the world of Afrikaans linguistics. His work remains to this day the high-water mark for the fields of Afrikaans philology and linguistics.

Scholtz sat on numerous committees such as the Taalkommissie of the South African Academy, the Van Riebeeck Society, the Historical Monuments Commission, the Archive Commission, and was one of the founders of the Vereniging vir die Vrye Boek. He was a member of the South African Academy of Arts and Sciences, the Maatschappij der Nederlandsche Letterkunde, the International Centre for Onomastics, and the Linguistic Society of America. He was also a co-trustee of the Irma Stern Trust.

The South African Academy of Arts and Sciences honored him with numerous awards: in 1970 with the first Langenhoven Prize for linguistics, and in 1974 with the first Stals Prize for art history. The Kaapse Drie-Eeuestigting added to this and celebrated his work on the Irma Stern Trust with an honorary award in 1972.

== Publications ==
His first scholarly work was an M.A. thesis on the language of the fishermen of Lambertsbaai, written under the tutelage of J. J. Smith, (which has subsequently been lost). In 1934 his publishing life began with the article "Afrikaanse geskrifte van Louis Henri Meurant uit die jare 1844-1850" in Tydskrif vir Wetenskap en Kuns, Jg. 12, Nr. 4, Julie 1934.

The most productive period for Scholtz, however, was after 1950, after his retirement from UCT in 1965. He now had time for his art studies, and also to publish analyses of the textual material that L.C. van Oordt had mined out of the Kaapse Argief. By this point in his intellectual life, Scholtz was in a perfect position to evaluate these texts.

Scholtz's monographs cover Strat Caldecott, Pieter Wenning, D. C. Boonzaier, Moses Kottler, and Katrine Harries. His work Strat Caldecott, 1886-1929 is a reference for Africana collectors.

== Work in the arts ==
He became interested in the fine arts at the height of classical modernism's zenith. In 1923, while at the National Press, he met the "famous and feared" D. C. Boonzaier, cartoonist and supporter of the fine arts in Cape Town. Through Boonzaier he became acquainted with art critic Bernard Lewis and sculptor Moses Kottler . Eventually, his circle of artist-friends was to include the painters Enslin du Plessis, Jean Welz, Florence Zerffi and Irma Stern, the graphic artist Katrine Harries, and, less intimately, Hendrik Pierneef, Erich Mayer, and Ruth Prowse, the members of a school of South African Impressionism in the years 1915–1935. This was perhaps the most important epoch in South African art, and Scholtz was there for all of it. Scholtz's literary friends were famous in South Africa: M.E.R., N.P. van Wyk Louw, Dirk Opperman, and Boerneef.

== Bibliography ==
=== Books ===
- 1939. Die Afrikaner en sy taal, 1805–1875. Nasionale Pers: Cape Town.
- 1941. Uit die geskiedenis van die naamgewing aan plante en diere in Afrikaans. Nasionale Pers: Cape Town.
- 1963. Taalhistoriese opstelle. Van Schaik: Pretoria. (Reprinted 1981)
- 1965a. Die Afrikaner en sy Taal, 1806–1875. 2nd ed. Nasou: Cape Town.
- 1965b. Afrikaans uit die vroeë tyd. Nasou: Cape Town.
- 1970a. Afrikaans-Hollands in die agtiende eeu. Nasou: Cape Town.
- 1970b. Strat Caldecott, 1886–1929. A.A. Balkema: Cape Town.
- 1973. D.C. Boonzaier en Pieter Wenning: Verslag van 'n vriendskap. Tafelberg: Cape Town.
- 1974. Naamgewing aan plante en diere in Afrikaans. 2nd ed. Nasou: Cape Town.
- 1976. Moses Kottler: His Cape Years. Tafelberg: Cape Town.
- 1978. Katrine Harries: Life and work. Tafelberg: Cape Town.
- 1979. Oor skilders en skrywers. Tafelberg: Cape Town.
- 1980. Wording en ontwikkeling van Afrikaans. Tafelberg: Cape Town.

=== Other works ===
- 1923 August. Review: Japie by J.R.L. van Bruggen. Die Huisgenoot: 187.
- 1934 July 23. Review: Oor die Afrikaanse taal by G.S. Nienaber. Die Burger.
- 1937a. Review: M.J. Koenen's Verklarend Handwoordenboek der Nederlandse Taal. Die Huisgenoot: 59.
- 1937b. Review: Groot Woordeboek. Afrikaans-Engels, Engels-Afrikaans. Die Huisgenoot: 59, 63.
- 1937 December 18. "Die halwe kring - antwoord op resensie van E.C. Pienaar." Die Burger.
- 1947 November 28. "D.C. Boonzaier: Beroemde Karikaturis en Merkwaardige Mens." Die Huisgenoot.
- 1950. Nederlandse invloed op die Afrikaanse woordeskat. Lesingsreeks van die Universiteit van Kaapstad No. 3. Oxford University Press: Kaapstad.
- 1952. "Die ontwikkeling van die Afrikaanse taal en letterkunde." In: Boekspieël van Suid-Afrika. Komitee van Boekuitstalling van Riebeeck-fees: Kaapstad: 85-115.
- 1954. "Structuurvergelijking tussen Nederlands en Afrikaans." Taal en Tongval 3(2&3): 101–104, co-authored with W. Gs. Hellinga.
- 1959. "Strat Caldecott (1886–1929)." Ons Kuns I, uitgegee deur die tydskrif Lantern in medewerking met die S.A. Uitsaaikorporasie, Pretoria, 67 vlg.
- 1964. "Kritiek op Afrikaanse taalgebruik." Standpunte Nuwe Reeks 52, Jg. 23(4): 32–36.
- 1965. "'n Dramatiese geskiedenis." Standpunte 33(4): 1–5.
- 1966a. "Grammatikareël of stylmiddel?" In: Smal swaard en blink. Bundel aangebied aan N.P. van Wyk Louw by geleentheid van sy sestigste verjaardag 11 Junie 1966. Academica: Pretoria - Kaapstad: 118–137.
- 1966b. "Afrikaans, External history of." In: Standard Encyclopædia of Southern Africa, Nasou: Cape Town: 63–80.
- 1966c. "Afrikaans, Internal history of." In: Standard Encyclopædia of Southern Africa, Nasou: Cape Town: 80-113.
- 1966d. "Boonzaier, Daniël Cornelis." In: Standard Encyclopædia of Southern Africa, Nasou: Cape Town: 422–423.
- 1966e. "Hesseling, Dirk Christiaan." In: Standard Encyclopædia of Southern Africa, Nasou: Cape Town: 513–514.
- 1971. Review: G.S. Nienaber, Afrikaans in die vroeë jare. Tydskrif vir geesteswetenskappe 11(4): 332.
- 1973. "By die honderste verjaarsdag van Pieter Wenning." Tydskrif vir geesteswetenskappe 13(4): 349–358.
- 1985a. "Vroeë taalkundige studies." Tydskrif vir geesteswetenskappe 25(2): 80-105.
- 1985b. "Afrikaanse woorde en uitdrukkinge - eiegoed of erfgoed?" Tydskrif vir geesteswetenskappe 25(4): 235–290.

=== Articles for Die Burger ===
- 1971 December 13. "Bonnard se rol in vandag se kuns."
- 1972 October 18. "Die verbondenheid van D.C. Boonzaier."
- 1973 May 4. "Stern-argief nou in biblioteek."
- 1973 May 7. "Stern-skatte na jare gevind."
- 1973 June 15. "Stukke getuienis oor ons grootste digter."
- 1973 September 10. "Voortrekkerhuis: Wenning se skilderye."
- 1973 December 6. "Van Wyk Louw: Skugter, maar nie geheimsinnig."
- 1973 December 31. "Le Vaillant en sy akwarelle."
- 1974 March 15. "Historiese huis en Pierneef."
- 1974 April 26. ",Nuwe' Caldecott opgespoor."
- 1974 August 12. "Skildery van Wenning geïdentifiseer."
- 1975 October 23. "'n Skildery van Wenning."
- 1976 January 8. "Verhaal van beeld in Kaapstad."
- 1976 March 10. "Kuns-speurwerk - en 'n verrassing."
- 1977 January 24. "'n ,Nuwe' Kottler."
- 1977 May 2. "Vroeë Caldecott-werk ontdek."
- 1977 August 15. "Verlore skilderye van Caldecott ontdek."
- 1978 January 18. "Noor se spotprente behou trefkrag."
- 1978 February 9. "Werke van Kottler 'ontdek'."
- 1978 August 9. "Identifikasie van 'n skildery."
- 1978 October 2. "Hy was 'n opregte mens."
- 1979 September 28. "Probleme met nagelate kunswerke."
- 1979 December 12. "Vyf vroue en die Nuwe Groep."
- 1980 March 19. "Katrine Harries se nagelate werk."
- 1981 March 10. "Onderskatte en half vergete skilder."
- 1981 April 9. "Malraux se groot slag."
- 1981 June 8. "'Onbekende' werk van Boonzaier."
- 1981 September 23. "SA Kunswerke wat verdwyn."
- 1982 February 25. "Ou Kaap herleef in seldsame boeke."
- 1982 February 26. "Geskiedenis van Kaapstad in ou kalenders."
- 1982 March 8. "'n Groot skilder in 'n klein land."
- 1982 June 22. "Ou boekwinkels en Kaapse kultuur."
- 1982 July 7. "Besonderse kuns van Kay."
- 1982 July 28. "Só het 'n boek ontstaan."
