= Gregoire Boonzaier =

South African painter (1909–2005)

Gregoire Boonzaier OMSS
- Self-portrait, 1993
- Born: 31 July 1909; Cape Town, South Africa
- Died: 22 April 2005 (aged 95); Onrus, near Hermanus, South Africa
- Education: Heatherley School of Fine Art; Central School of Art and Design
- Occupation: artist
- Known for: Cape Impressionism
- Father: Daniël Cornelis Boonzaier

Gregoire Johannes Boonzaier OMSS (31 July 1909 – 22 April 2005) was a South African artist well known for his landscapes, portraits and still life paintings. He was a famous exponent of Cape Impressionism, a founder of the New Group, and a contributor, through his art works, to the struggle against apartheid.

== Biography ==
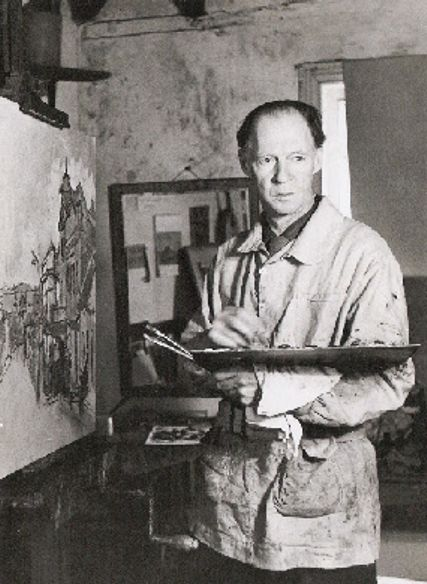
The artist in his studio in Wynberg, 1968

Gregoire Boonzaier was the fifth child of political cartoonist Daniël Cornelis Boonzaier and his cousin Maria Elizabeth Boonzaier. Early on Gregoire made the acquaintance of the artists Pieter Wenning, Nita Spilhaus, Moses Kottler and Anton van Wouw, all of whom were close family friends.

It was Moses Kottler who first gave Gregoire a box of paints in 1922 and Nita Spilhaus an easel in 1926, igniting a creative flame that was to burn for more than eighty years. Gregoire's father was dead set against a formal training in art and felt that he had more to learn from the artists around him. In 1923 his first two oil paintings were shown at Ashbey's Gallery in Cape Town, simply signed "GREGOIRE". His first one-man exhibition followed two years later – he was to hold more than 100 one-man exhibitions during his painting career.

After an acrimonious confrontation with his father in 1932, Gregoire moved into his own studio in Cape Town and after a successful exhibition visited England in 1934 where he was a student together with Terence McCaw and Frieda Lock at the Heatherley School of Fine Art under Bernard Adams, and training in graphic art techniques at the Central School of Art and Design in London. His early paintings having been strongly influenced by Pieter Wenning, he now absorbed the work of Van Gogh, Cézanne, Utrillo and Braque, and made trips as far afield as Russia, where his socialist leanings are reinforced. He returned three years later to help found the New Group, with Terence McCaw, Frieda Lock, Lippy Lipshitz and others, and served as its first chairman for ten years. The New Group served as a forum and mouthpiece of young South African art for almost 15 years, staging exhibitions throughout the country, and providing rural areas with a glimpse of the new trends in art. He served for six years on the Board of the South African National Gallery, Cape Town.

Boonzaier made Cape Town his base and his subsequent work reflected views of District Six and the Malay Quarter, recording its colourful life. He settled at Onrusrivier, a short distance outside Hermanus. He had been introduced to Onrus shortly after World War II by Uys Krige whose family had holidayed there for many years.

He took part with 43 SA artists, in the "Exhibition of South African Art" at the Tate Gallery in London in 1948.

== Honours and awards ==
Boonzaier received three honorary doctorates. His numerous prizes and awards included the silver Order for Meritorious Service presented by Nelson Mandela in 1999. His work is to be found in private and corporate collections throughout the world.

== Death ==
In 2003 Gregoire's sons, Anton and Emile, together with the family accountant Sybrand Smit, took over the financial side of his art studio. In the same year Marie, Boonzaier's partner of some 60 years, succumbed to a stroke. In November 2004 Boonzaier completed some works, and tidied his studio for the last time. In February 2005 he took to bed on a hunger strike, waiting for death, which came at 10:15 p.m. on 22 April.
