= Nita Spilhaus =

Portuguese-born South African painter

Stone Pines outside Cape Town

Nita Spilhaus born Pauline Augusta Wilhelmina Spilhaus (5 February 1878 Lisbon - 12 September 1967 Rondebosch) was a Portuguese-born South African painter, working in oil, watercolour and pastel. She is best known for her landscapes, paintings and etchings of trees, her portrayals of the Cape mountains, and depictions of the Malay Quarter.

She was the daughter of Christian Ludwig Karl Spilhaus (27 June 1847 Lübeck - 13 September 1878 Lisbon) and Virginia Augusta Coelho (18 September 1855 - 5 February 1878). Her siblings were Virginia Henriette Wiesner (1874) and Karl Antonio Spilhaus (1876).

Nita's father moved from Lübeck in order to run a branch of the family business in Lisbon, and it was there that he met his Portuguese wife-to-be. After the loss of both her parents during her infancy, her mother dying in childbirth and her father some months later, Nita was raised by her grandfather in Lübeck, and her first training in drawing and etching took place at the Lübeck School of Art, then in Munich, where she attended a private art school run by Friedrich Fehr, the Dachau art colony just outside Munich under Adolf Hölzel, and copper engraving under Heinrich Wolff. She was part of a young artists' community in Schwabing and in 1900 published a folio of her etchings.

She moved to Cape Colony in 1907 because of the death of her grandfather in 1906, joining her brother Karl, and the family of her uncle Arnold Wilhelm Spilhaus (1845-1946) at his home 'Hohenort' in Constantia, who had already settled in the Cape, was managing a successful import/export company, was an enthusiastic hiker and botanist, and was a founder member of the Mountain Club of South Africa. In due course she befriended various artists such as Edward Roworth, Moses Kottler, Allerley Glossop, Pieter Wenning, Ruth Prowse, Hugo Naudé and Florence Zerffi, who nursed her back to health during the 1918 flu pandemic.

She joined the 'South African Society of Artists' soon after her arrival. The Cape Times acknowledged her talent as a graphic artist by publishing a modest booklet of 12 etchings portraying scenes in and around Cape Town. Working from a studio in Keerom Street in Cape Town she gradually became a leading member of Cape Town's art community. When Hugo Naudé visited Munich in 1913 she took over his art classes in Worcester. Even so, in a frenzy of wartime paranoia her brother was charged with being a German conspirator, and she, also a German national, was severely restricted in her movements during WWI, being only permitted to paint indoors, resulting in a large number of still lifes. She also applied for a position as curator of the Michaelis Collection, but her German provenance disqualified her.

She married an osteologist Ernst Simon in 1921, the couple returning to Munich in 1925, living and working there until 1938, just before WWII, when they moved back to South Africa to stay. Ernst Simon died in 1943, and in the 1950s Nita and her widowed sister moved to Jonkershoek Valley. A progressive loss of eyesight forced her to cease painting.

Her oil paintings were Impressionist in style, her landscapes rich in atmosphere, while her flower studies are notable for their vivid colours. She had a particular affinity with trees and her striking images of the stone pines around Cape Town are a recurring theme in her work.

The name 'Spilhaus' is derived from the older German surname 'Spielhausen'.
