= Bernard Lewis (disambiguation) =

Bernard Lewis (1916–2018) was a British-American historian.

Bernard Lewis may also refer to:

- Bernard Lewis (entrepreneur) (1926–2026), founder of the River Island retail chain
- Bernard Lewis (critic) (1870–1956), South African art critic
- Bernie Lewis (born 1945), Welsh footballer
- Bernard Lewis (scientist) (1899–1993), English engineer
- Bernard Lewis (rugby league) (born 1997), rugby player
