= Statue of Jan Hendrik Hofmeyr =

Sculpture of the South African journalist and politician in Cape Town

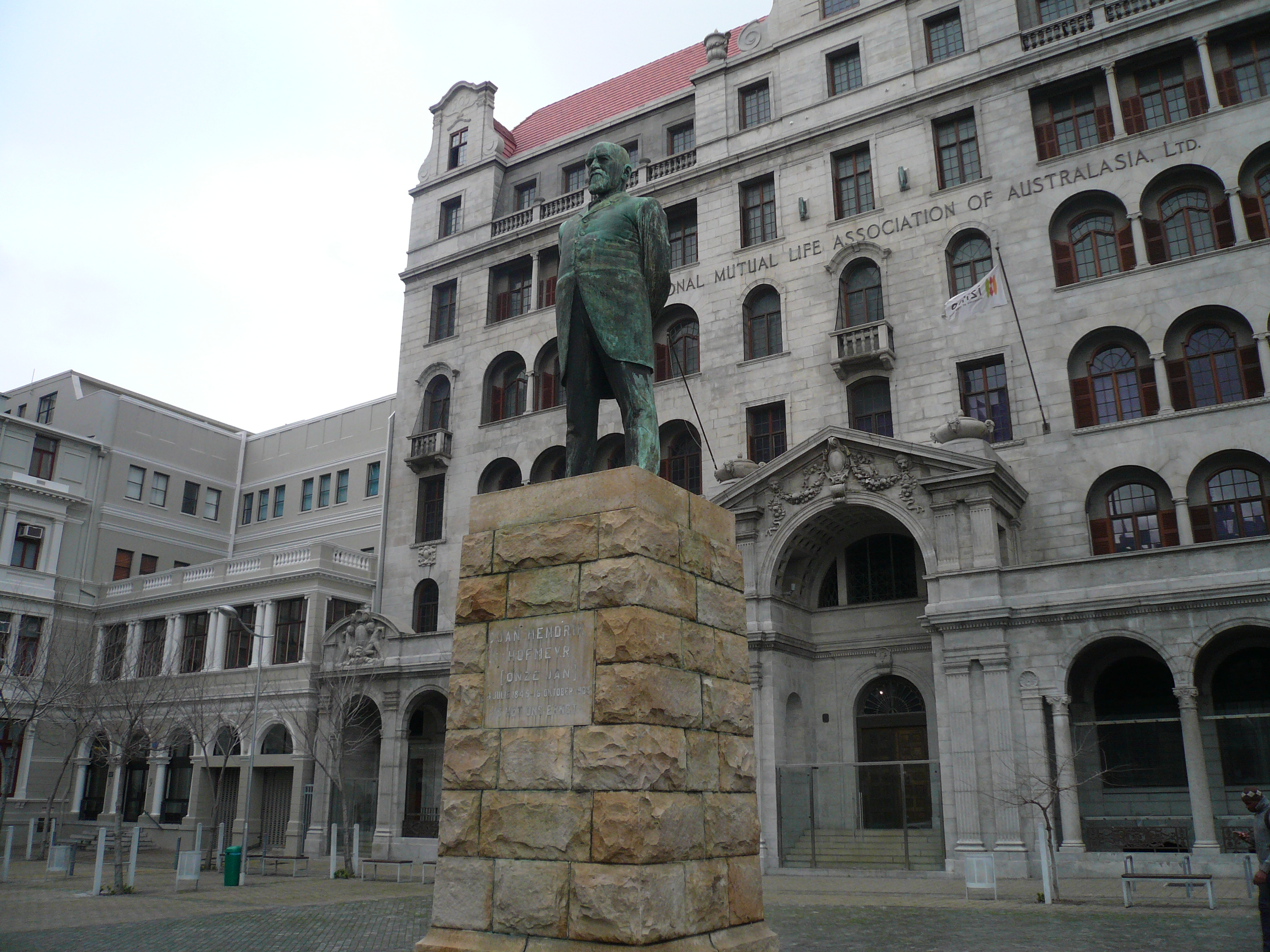
- Hofmeyr's statue in Church Square in 2012.

- Artist: Anton van Wouw
- Subject: Jan Hendrik Hofmeyr
- Location: Church Square, Cape Town
- 33°55′31″S 18°25′17″E

The statue of Jan Hendrik Hofmeyr in Church Square, Cape Town, is a sculpture of the South African journalist and politician Jan Hendrik Hofmeyr, affectionately known as "Onze Jan" (Our Jan). The statue was sculptured by Anton van Wouw.

In April 2015 it was wrongly reported that the statue had been vandalised as part of a wider campaign against statues of colonial-era figures in South Africa. The statue's pedestal was covered with white material bearing the words "A black woman raised me". It was later clarified that the statue had been part of an art initiative, supported by the Open City Arts Initiative, by the visual artist Kenan Petersen and illustrator Pola Maneli that happened to have coincided with the student lead protest movement targeting statues elsewhere.
