= Pieter Wenning =

South African artist (1873 - 1921)

Pieter Willem Frederick Wenning
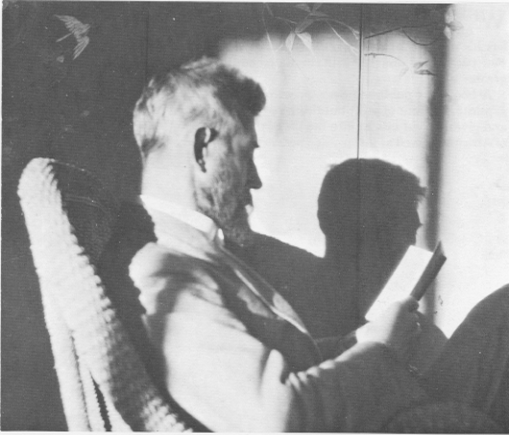
- Pieter Wenning – Oct 1919
- Born: Pieter Willem Frederick Wenning; 9 September 1873; The Hague, Netherlands
- Died: 24 January 1921 (aged 47); Pretoria, South Africa
- Education: self taught
- Known for: Painting
- Movement: Cape Impressionism
- Patrons: D. C. Boonzaier; Denys Lefebvre; Ernest Lezard; Frans Engelenburg

Pieter Willem Frederick Wenning (9 September 1873 – 24 January 1921) was a South African painter and etcher, considered to be the progenitor of the style of Cape Impressionism.

== Early life and education ==
Pieter Wenning was born in The Hague, the son of Heerke and Elizabeth Wenning-Neukirchen. The family moved to Leeuwarden when Wenning was aged five years. His father owned a shop where he dealt in artists' materials, pictures and prints and cooperated with his brother Johannes, and Johannes Rietstap. He also had a cousin, Ype Wenning, who was a Frisian painter, thus coming into contact with painting at an early age.

Wenning was sent to the Hogere Burgerschool where the art teacher, a Mr. J. Bubberman, discerned the boy's talent and encouraged him. Despite Bubberman's persuasions, Wenning's parents were dubious and steered him towards a position at headquarters of the Hollandsche IJzeren Spoorweg Maatschappij in Amsterdam, where he gained rapid promotion and was transferred to an administrative post in Zaandam. His sympathies with the plight of the Dutch poor became his undoing, when, in 1903, he participated in a general strike in solidarity with blue-collar railroad workers. The strike was suppressed and he was summarily dismissed.

Wenning had married a young widow, Johanna Hillegonda Kramer, on 3 September 1898, and she had two children from a previous marriage. To support his family he obtained employment with the firm of J. H. de Bussy in Amsterdam, the largest publishing house in the Netherlands. When the offer came of a position as a clerk in a bookshop in South Africa, he leapt at the opportunity. The firm of H.A.U.M. de Bussy & Jacques Dusseau appointed him to the de Bussy branch in Pretoria.

== The Pretoria Bookshop ==
The family sailed from the East India Docks, London on 12 May 1905 and arrived at Cape Town on 4 June 1905. From there they sailed to Durban and travelled to Pretoria by rail, arriving in mid-June 1905.

Wenning and his family lived in a wood and iron cottage in Rietfontein on the outskirts of Pretoria. He sold books, stationery, prints and artist's materials, earning £17 a month. Unable to afford the materials for painting, he drew incessantly and through diligent saving, eventually imported a second-hand etching press from the Netherlands, with which he became a pioneer in etching in South Africa. It was also at Rietfontein, around 1909, where Wenning began experimenting with oils.

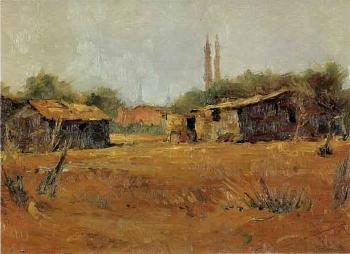
Native Location, Pretoria (1911), oil on canvas, 23 x 33 cm

After four years in Rietfontein, Wenning was able to rent a property in Rissik Street, Pretoria. It was shortly after this that he contracted malaria, an insidious disease in Pretoria of the early twentieth century. He recovered, but would suffer the consequences to his heart for the rest of his life.

=== The Individualists ===
Through the bookshop, Wenning became acquainted with a number of Pretoria personalities, who decided to form a society they called The Individualists. Wenning became secretary. It is known that Pierneef and George Smithard were also founding members.

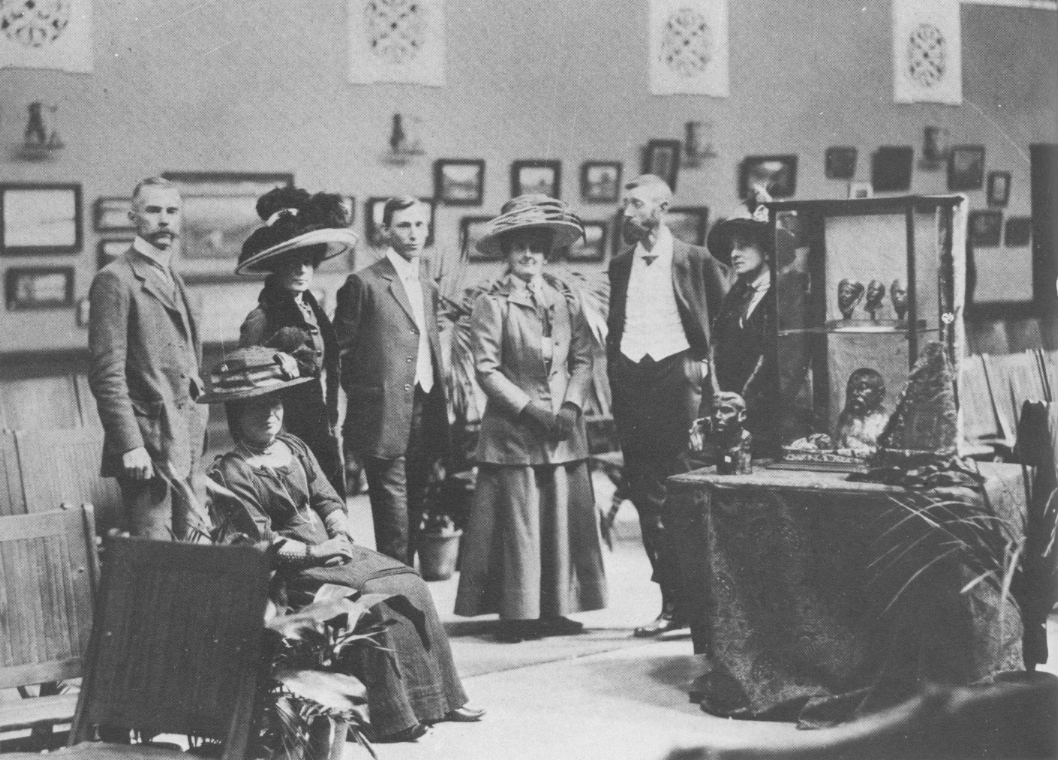
The Individualists, c1910/1911, left to right: Dr. Grünberger, Nina Murray, Marcele Piltan, Pierneef, Ms. Harding of the Normal College, Pieter Wenning and Ms. Stent.

The group was formed towards the middle of 1911, and held their first exhibition on 20 November 1911. Other early members were Marcelle Piltan, Selina Harding, Madge Cook, Nina Murray, Sydney Stent and Mr G. Schild. In 1912, Miss G. Anderson and Mr. J.L. Gartner were added and Fanie Eloff was invited to exhibit with them.

== Johannesburg ==
When De Bussy opened a branch in Johannesburg, they approached Wenning to manage the art department. A larger salary lured him, but the monotony of the work soon proved unbearable. When, in July 1913, De Bussy's gave him an opportunity to visit the Cape Province, he welcomed it. He brought with him etchings and reproductions by French and Dutch masters, visiting leading Cape artists and collectors in the hope of interesting them. It was amongst these visits, that he became acquainted with D. C. Boonzaier who would become his patron and guiding influence.

In Johannesburg he befriended Ernest Lezard, George Smithard, a leading painter in Johannesburg, the architect Joseph Michael Solomon, Anton van Wouw and Paul Methuen.

After a failed attempt to start his own venture, an art shop on the corner of Eloff and Plain Streets, he took a position at his friend Van Schaik's bookshop in Pretoria. D. C. Boonzaier came to his aid by persuading several of his friends to guarantee a sum of money sufficient to enable Wenning to work in the Cape for three months. Ernest Lezard would launch a similar fund later in the year.

== Cape Town ==
Caricature of Wenning by his friend and patron, D. C. Boonzaier

Wenning arrived at the Cape on 2 March 1916, met by Boonzaier, who had rented a large room in Government House, Newlands Avenue. Years later another South African painter, Gwelo Goodman, occupied the same house.

He worked every day, painting en plein air, completing about 40 paintings on this first visit. Evenings were spent at the Boonzaier house. Boonzaier himself was an avid collector of Oriental works of art. In bad weather Wenning painted still lifes in Boonzaier's study, with objects like an old Chinese Buddha or a Ming bowl.

One morning he came across Malta Farm, one of the Cape's earliest landmarks and was so taken that he painted the scene until nightfall. Initially thinking the picture a failure, he was persuaded by Boonzaier to complete it the next day. It is considered one of his strongest works.

At the end of three month, Boonzaier arranged a private exhibition, at his studio in Keerom Street, for the guarantors. Nearly all picture were sold. After a brief return to Pretoria, Ernest Lezard, a far sighted art dealer, set the plans in motion for further financing to return to the Cape. With these assurances, Wenning's Transvaal period came to an end.

Wenning took a studio at the Vineyard Hotel, Newlands, the original home built by Lady Anne Barnard in 1799. He was attracted to the Malay Quarter and was the first outstanding painter of it.

In order to repay the donors of the Johannesburg Fund, Wenning sent forty pictures to Lezard, where they were auctioned to the public on 12 March 1917 as the Wenning Art Fund Sale. The sale consisted largely of oil, watercolours and drawings of Newlands, Bishopscourt and the Malay Quarter. Proceeds were barely enough to repay the donors.

Despite poor health he managed to exhibit ten more works in Cape Town, on 9 July 1917, in collaboration with Edward Roworth, Hugo Naudé and Nita Spilhaus. On 21 September 1917, he showed 54 pictures at Lezard in Johannesburg, again to be disappointed by proceeds of only £225. Trips to Lourenco Marques and Durban followed, but by the winter of 1918, Wenning was back in the Cape, where an influenza epidemic was raging. The results of an exhibition held at Ashbey's Galleries on 12 November 1918, held without reserve, could not have brightened his mood, as works were sold at very low prices. On 23 February 1919, his wife died.

His health failing him, Wenning was moved to the Somerset Hospital in Cape Town on 19 July 1920. He was moved to the Zuid Afrikaanse Hospitaal in Pretoria and died there, of tuberculosis, on 24 January 1921.

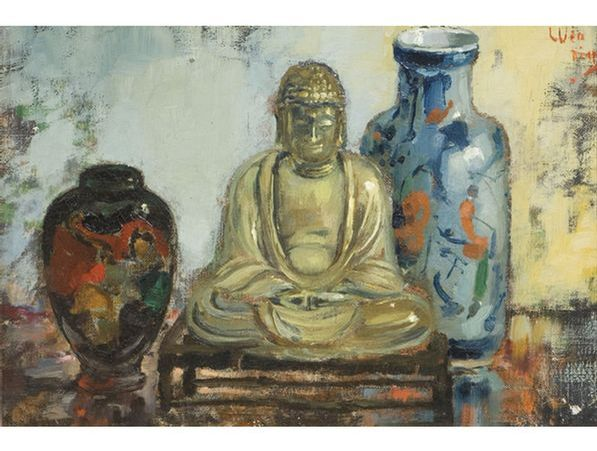
Buddha with two vases, oil on canvas, 21.5 x 31.5 cm

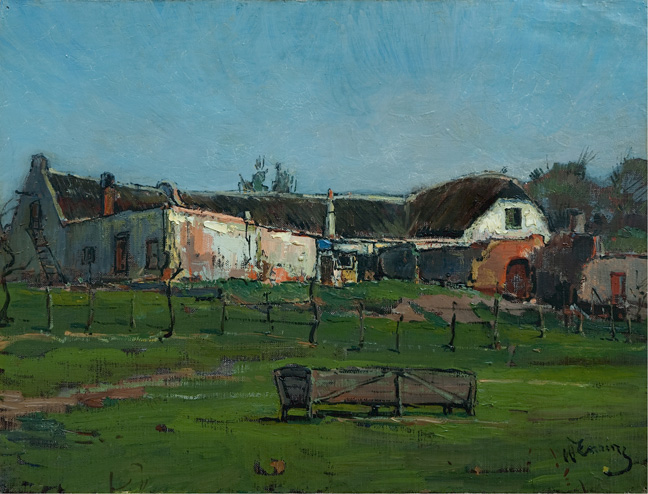
Backyard, Malta Farm, Observatory, oil on canvas, 34 x 46 cm

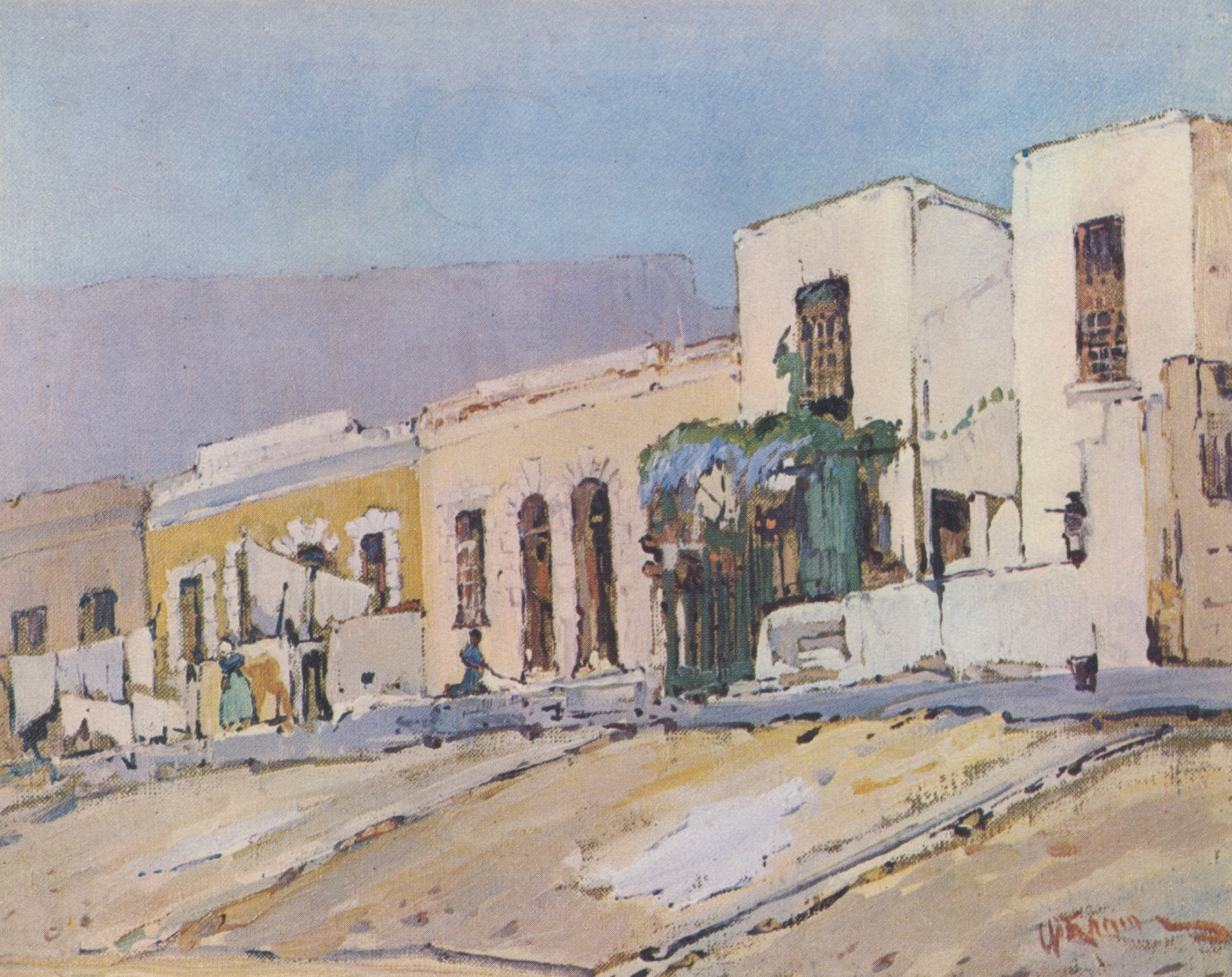
Malay Quarter, oil on canvas, 36.5 cm x 46.5

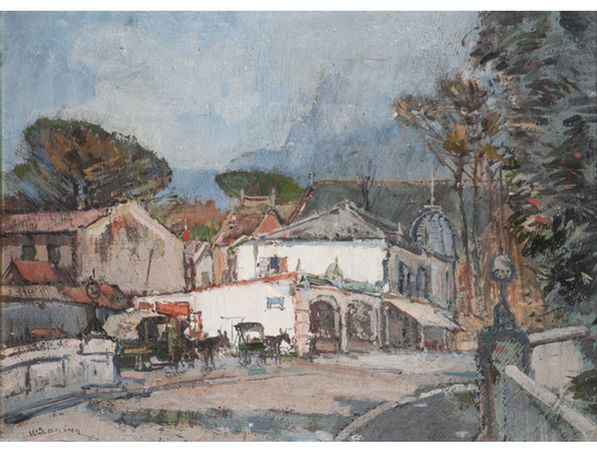
The Bridge, Rondebosch, oil on canvas, 27.5 cm x 37 cm

== His art ==
Pieter Wenning has the distinction of being the progenitor of a style of painting often referred to as Cape Impressionism. He excelled at the quiescent landscape, nature at rest. His method was to complete a work en plein air and with his subject before him. Yet the myth of Wenning's spontaneity is effectively exploded by the existence of a large number of studies, sketches and unfinished drawings. The freshness and delicate atmospheric qualities of his best works were achieved by hard work.

In portraiture his attempts are generally considered failures, although a portrait of D. C. Boonzaier has become recognisable.

=== The art market ===
Although the artist was impoverished during his lifetime, the rise in popularity of Impressionism soon conferred prestige on owning a Wenning. By 1968, Dr. Helmut Silberberg was able to stage a retrospective of 100 works in Cape Town. Wenning's Transvaal evening (Nelspruit) was priced at R9,750 and his Witwatersrand at R8,000. At the time these were unheard of prices for a South African artist. In 1970, a still life sold at Ashbey's Galleries, the scene of the disastrous 1918 sale, for R2,900.

=== Forgeries and fakes ===
Fraudulent misrepresentation of an artist's work is related to the demand for works and the ease with which the artist's style lends itself to imitation. Thus, Wenning and Tinus de Jongh were frequently targets of early fakery. Between 1944 and 1947, a wave of forgeries resulted in fake Wennings making their way into the art trade. Everard Read and Anton Hendriks (director of the Johannesburg Municipal Art Gallery) brought the existence of Wenning fakes to public attention in 1963.

== Major collections ==
Pieter Wenning's works are included in a number of major collections:

- South African National Gallery, Cape Town
- Johannesburg Art Gallery, Johannesburg
- Pretoria Art Museum, Pretoria
- Durban Art Gallery, Durban
- William Humphreys Art Gallery, Kimberley
