= Van Wouw Museum =

Art museum in Pretoria, South Africa

Anton van Wouw House
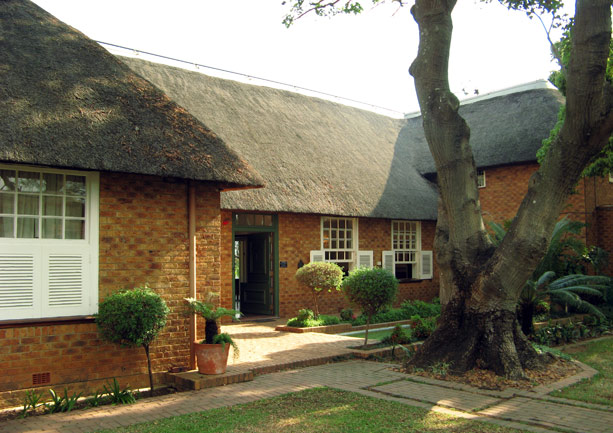
- Anton van Wouw House
- Established: 1974
- Dissolved: 2008, Moved to the Edoardo Villa Museum on the University of Pretoria Hatfield campus
- Location: Brooklyn, Pretoria, South Africa
- Type: Sculpture

The Van Wouw House, was the last residence of the South African artist Anton van Wouw.

== Anton van Wouw (1862–1945) ==
Anton van Wouw was born in Driebergen, near Utrecht in the Netherlands on the 26th of December 1862. He had training in academic sculpture in Europe, initially in the studio of the Belgian sculptor Joseph Graven (1836–1877), later through evening classes at the Rotterdam Academy, and also working alongside other Stucco workers such as Vielvoije. The experience which he gained early in his life as a stucco-worker had also influenced his preference in the art of modeling.

== History of the Van Wouw House ==
The Van Wouw House, now the property of the University of Pretoria, was the last home and studio of the sculptor Anton van Wouw (1862-1945), which he built in 1937. He commissioned the architect Norman Eaton to build a house for him on the southern property.

There was an ornamental pool, and later on a garden. The house was built with face brick, has a thatch roof and wooden window frames with shutters.

Van Wouw moved into his new home early in 1939 and lived there until his death on 30 June 1945. Another professor then occupied the house until 1973. During the 25th Annual General Meeting of the Rembrandt Group on 16 November 1973, Anton Rupert announced that a sum of money equal to the selling price of the property had been given to the University of Pretoria to purchase the Van Wouw House. Rupert officially handed over the house to the University on 21 May 1974.

From about 1976 to 2008 the house was dedicated to being a museum for the artist, however in 2008 the University of Pretoria moved the museum contents to the Hatfield campus due to security problems as well as the access it provided for students. The House houses the Tangible Heritage Conservation Studio of the university where future conservators are trained.
