= D. C. Boonzaier =

South African cartoon artist

- Portrait by Moses Kottler, 1918.
- Born: 11 November 1865; Patatsrivier, Carnarvon, Cape Colony
- Died: 20 March 1950 (aged 84); Cape Town, South Africa
- Occupation: Cartoonist
- Children: Gregoire Boonzaier

Daniël Cornelis Boonzaier (11 November 1865 – 20 March 1950), more commonly known as D.C. Boonzaier, was a South African cartoonist. He was famous for his caricatures of Cape politicians and celebrities at the turn of the century, and later for his anti-capitalist and anti-imperialist cartoons for Die Burger. He fathered the artist Gregoire Boonzaier.

== Early life ==
Boonzaier was born on a Karoo farm in the country districts near Harmsfontein (later renamed Carnarvon), then part of the Cape Colony, in 1865. He received his first education at Carnarvon and joined the local magistrate's office as a clerk. In 1882, when he was 16 years old, Boonzaier moved to Cape Town to work in the office of the Master of the Cape Supreme Court, having been offered the job because of his impressive copperplate handwriting. He also worked in the Colonial Office and Orphan Chamber.

== Career ==
Boonzaier had drawn amateur caricatures since 1884. He was inspired by the work of William Howard Schröder, a cartoonist and publisher of the humorous weekly, The Knobkerrie, whom he later met when a work of his was accepted for publication. Boonzaier had no formal art tuition, but closely studied the work of George du Maurier and Phil May of Punch fame.

Caricature of Louis Botha (Owlographs, 1901).

In 1889 he resigned from his job in the civil service and became a professional cartoonist. Several newspapers, like Cape Punch, The Telephone and The Owl, began regularly publishing his work. In 1891 he started work on a gallery of South African and foreign notables and persuaded them to sign their caricatures; included are Paul Kruger, Piet Joubert, Ellen Terry, Sarah Bernhardt, Henrik Ibsen, Leo Tolstoy, Émile Zola, Alphonse Daudet and Pierre Loti. Another collection, Owlographs, published in 1901, was dedicated to the members and visitors of the celebrated Owl Club, a society co-founded by Boonzaier in 1894 and "whose particular purpose was to entertain important visitors to the Cape". The collection is of great historical interest, as it depicts virtually all the main political actors of the time: Lord Milner, Cecil Rhodes, Gordon Sprigg, John X. Merriman, J. W. Sauer and W. P. Schreiner; Sirs John Henry de Villiers, Henry Juta and James Rose Innes; and Boer leaders like Paul Kruger, Marthinus Steyn, Louis Botha, Christiaan de Wet and F. W. Reitz. In 1903 Boonzaier was hired by The South Africa News, becoming South Africa's first full-time newspaper cartoonist.

Boonzaier began working for Die Burger when it was founded in 1915 and continued to do so until 1940. The paper was the mouthpiece of J. B. M. Hertzog's newly formed National Party (NP) and was edited by D. F. Malan, then beginning his political career as NP leader in the Cape Province. Boonzaier's cartoons were powerful propaganda for the NP's resurgent Afrikaner nationalism, which opposed Louis Botha and Jan Smuts' relatively pro-Imperial and free-market South African Party. Though Botha had been a prominent bittereinder during the Boer War, as South Africa's first Prime Minister he was perceived as naively conciliatory and pro-Imperial, and became a regular target of Boonzaier's caricatures. But most influential were Boonzaier's anti-capitalist cartoons featuring the character Hoggenheimer, whom Boonzaier had borrowed from turn-of-the-century musical The Girl from Kays to evoke Randlords like Sir Ernest Oppenheimer. Though Boonzaier denied it, the character was widely assumed to be Jewish and came to be used to inflame anti-Semitism, most notoriously in the strident opposition to Jewish immigration in the 1930s. Certainly Boonzaier's cartoons expressed contempt for mining interests on the Rand, whose supposed exploitation of poor Afrikaners Smuts' government did little to prevent. These sentiments intensified when Smuts brutally suppressed the 1922 Rand Revolt, after which Hertzog swept to election victory over him and initiated a series of measures to protect white workers. Hertzog's later alliance with Smuts was vehemently opposed by Malan's Cape NP and Die Burger, and Hertzog soon came to be caricatured by Boonzaier as Hoggenheimer's stooge.

== Contribution to the arts ==
Remarkably for a boy from the veld with very little schooling, Boonzaier's home was "a haven of culture in Cape Town". He was a lifelong enthusiast for theatre, both as an actor and producer, and kept a journal of his theatre-going which was later published and became important source material. He was probably the first owner of a gramophone in Cape Town, and collected books on the Impressionists and Hague School and colour reproductions of their work not otherwise available in South Africa. He maintained correspondence with Leo Tolstoy, Bernhardt, George Bernard Shaw, Henry Irving and Gilbert and Sullivan.

Boonzaier was a major patron to painter Pieter Wenning; Moses Kottler was another protégé. Boonzaier's closest friends were Wenning, Kottler, Sangiro (A. A. Pienaar, one of the first writers of Afrikaans prose) and the Dutch-South African sculptor Anton van Wouw. His son Gregoire Boonzaier is considered a household name in Cape Impressionism and founded and organised the New Group.

== In popular culture ==
James A. Michener's historical novel The Covenant refers to Boonzaier's Hoggenheimer cartoons and their contribution to populist fears.
