= Erich Mayer =

German artist and writer (1876–1960)

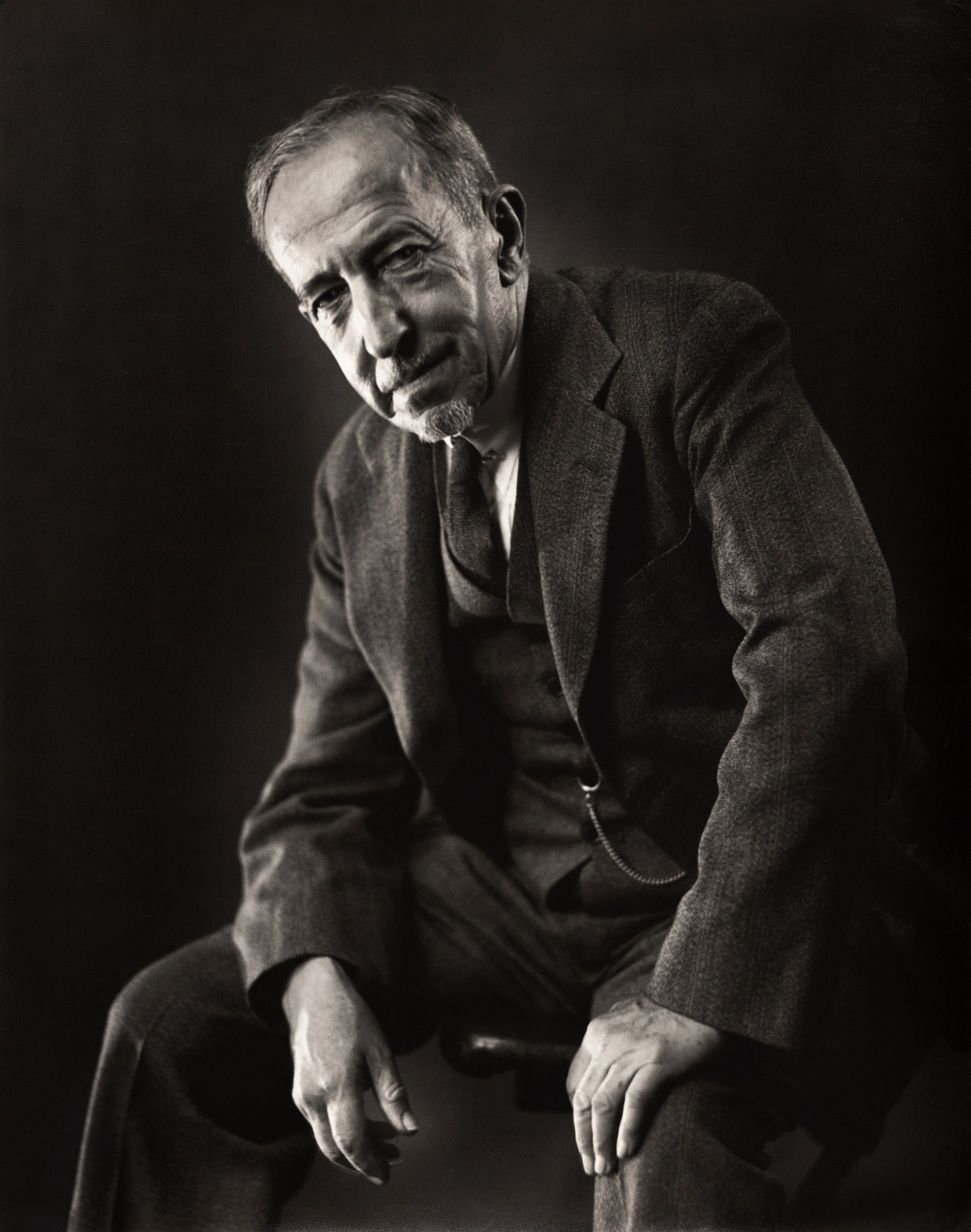
"Erich Mayer" By Sara Buijskes

Erich Ernst Karl Mayer (1876–1960) was a German-Jewish artist, writer and philosopher who migrated and settled in South Africa and has been recognized for his contributions towards an indigenous South African artistic style.

== Early life ==
Born in Karlsruhe, Germany and raised in Berlin, Mayer was awarded a scholarship to study architecture. However, an illnesses prevented him from completing his degree, and he moved to South Africa, where he worked as a land surveyor. Mayer joined a boer commando during the Anglo Boer War, and sketched local farm where he stayed overnight. He was captured in Mafikeng, sent to St Helena as a prisoner of war and then returned to Germany.

== Influence on South Africa ==
Mayer returned to South Africa and In 1912 he settled in Pretoria, where he began advocating for a National Art Identity. He gained particular fame with his meticulous and sympathetic portrayal of the life of the farmer in the interior. He died in Pretoria in 1960.
