= Pierneef =

South African artist (1886 - 1957)

Jacobus Hendrik Pierneef
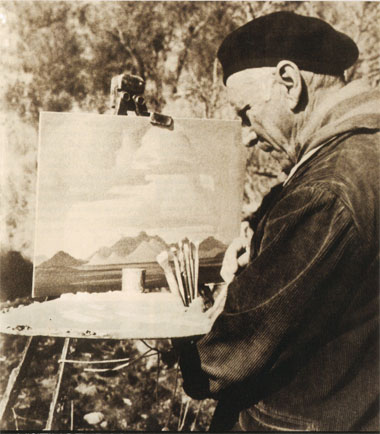
- Pierneef at work (before 1957)
- Born: 13 August 1886; Pretoria, South African Republic
- Died: 4 October 1957 (aged 71); Pretoria, South Africa
- Known for: landscape artist

Jacobus Hendrik (Henk) Pierneef (usually referred to as Pierneef) (13 August 1886 Pretoria – 4 October 1957 Pretoria), was a South African landscape artist, generally considered to be one of the best of the old South African masters. His distinctive style is widely recognised and his work was greatly influenced by the South African landscape.

Most of his landscapes were of the South African highveld, which provided a lifelong source of inspiration for him. Pierneef's style was to reduce and simplify the landscape to geometric structures, using flat planes, lines and colour to present the harmony and order in nature. This resulted in formalised, ordered and often-monumental views of the South African landscape, uninhabited and with dramatic light and colour.

Pierneef's work can be seen worldwide in many private, corporate and public collections, including the Africana Museum, Durban Art Gallery, Johannesburg Art Gallery, Nelson Mandela Metropolitan Art Museum, Pierneef Museum and the Pretoria Art Gallery.

== Life history ==
Pierneef was born in Pretoria, from Dutch and Afrikaner parentage. He started his high school career at the Staatsmodelschool (literally "model state school") there, where he took his first art classes, but it was interrupted by the Second Boer War. Due to the war, the Pierneef family decided to move back to the Netherlands in 1901. While there he studied at the Rotterdamse Kunstakademie. During this time, he also came into contact with the works of the old masters, which left a lasting impression on him.

Pierneef returned to Pretoria at the age of 18, where he met with and was encouraged by already established South African artists such as his godfather Anton van Wouw, Hugo Naude and Frans Oerder. His first public exhibition, where his work was generally well received, was with van Wouw and Naude in 1902. He worked at the State Library during the night for almost ten years and painted in his studio during the day. In 1910, Pierneef married Agatha Delen, a woman 12 years his senior.

Pierneef held his first solo exhibition in 1913, to great critical acclaim, some even describing his work as that of a genius, which inspired him greatly. His second solo exhibition was held two years later and was also very well received. During this period, he also did various illustrations for a periodicals and books.

In 1918, Pierneef left the State Library and started a career as an art lecturer at the Heidelberg (South Africa) College of Education. In that year he also painted the bush camp of Anton van Wouw of which two versions remains to today. One with, and one without visitors. During these camping adventures Van Wouw and Pierneef talked, sketched, fished for kurper and drank a great deal of coffee.

During the following year, he also started teaching drawing at the Pretoria College of Education. These positions gave him the opportunity to focus on his art and he participated in many successful solo and group exhibitions during 1920 to 1921. Due to the recognition that he received, Pierneef realised that he was setting the trend for a unique South African style. Personally, it was a difficult time in his life – his wife Agatha suffered from a mental disorder and also started to lose her sight.

Pierneef resigned as lecturer and became a full-time painter in 1923, due to differences of opinion regarding the curriculum with the Department of Education.

Pierneef visited South West Africa (now Namibia) from 1923 to 1924, where he sketched extensively for paintings that would later be completed in his studio. These would later be considered some of his best works.

Despite his successes, he was experiencing some financial difficulties, and had to resort to other jobs to make ends meet. During one of these, an advertising project to sell the land around Hartebeespoort dam, he met his future second wife, a Dutch woman named May Schoep. Pierneef divorced Agatha in 1923 and married May in 1924.

The couple visited Europe from 1925 to 1926, where Pierneef promoted his art and also studied the newest art movements. He also held a solo exhibition in the Netherlands, where his Bushmen drawings drew great attention.

In 1927 Pierneef's daughter was born and he held a very successful exhibition of 86 of his works in Pretoria. However, during his solo exhibition the following year, he had some abstract modern works on display, which were very badly received, compelling him to revert to his old style. His daughter's name was Marita ("Mickie") Pierneef. May Pierneef (née Schoop) was the sister of Albertha Louise du Preez, nickname Be (née Schoop) who was married to Dr Jan Dirk Gysbert du Preez (a doctor, graduated in the Netherlands and Maths genius), who brought May Schoop and their mother, Wietje, to South Africa from the Netherlands, when he married Be.

Pierneef accepted a commission in 1929 to paint 32 panels for the interior of the then-new Johannesburg Railway Station, a task he completed by 1932. Since 2002 the complete set of thirty two panels, twenty eight landscape and four tree scenes, is on long term loan from the Transnet Foundation to the Rupert Art Foundation and have also been exhibited in the Johan Rupert Centre in Graaff-Reinet. The panels are considered to be some of his best work.

In 1933, he was commissioned to do seven murals for South Africa House, the South African embassy on Trafalgar Square, London. Pierneef completed this work in 1934.

== Gallery ==
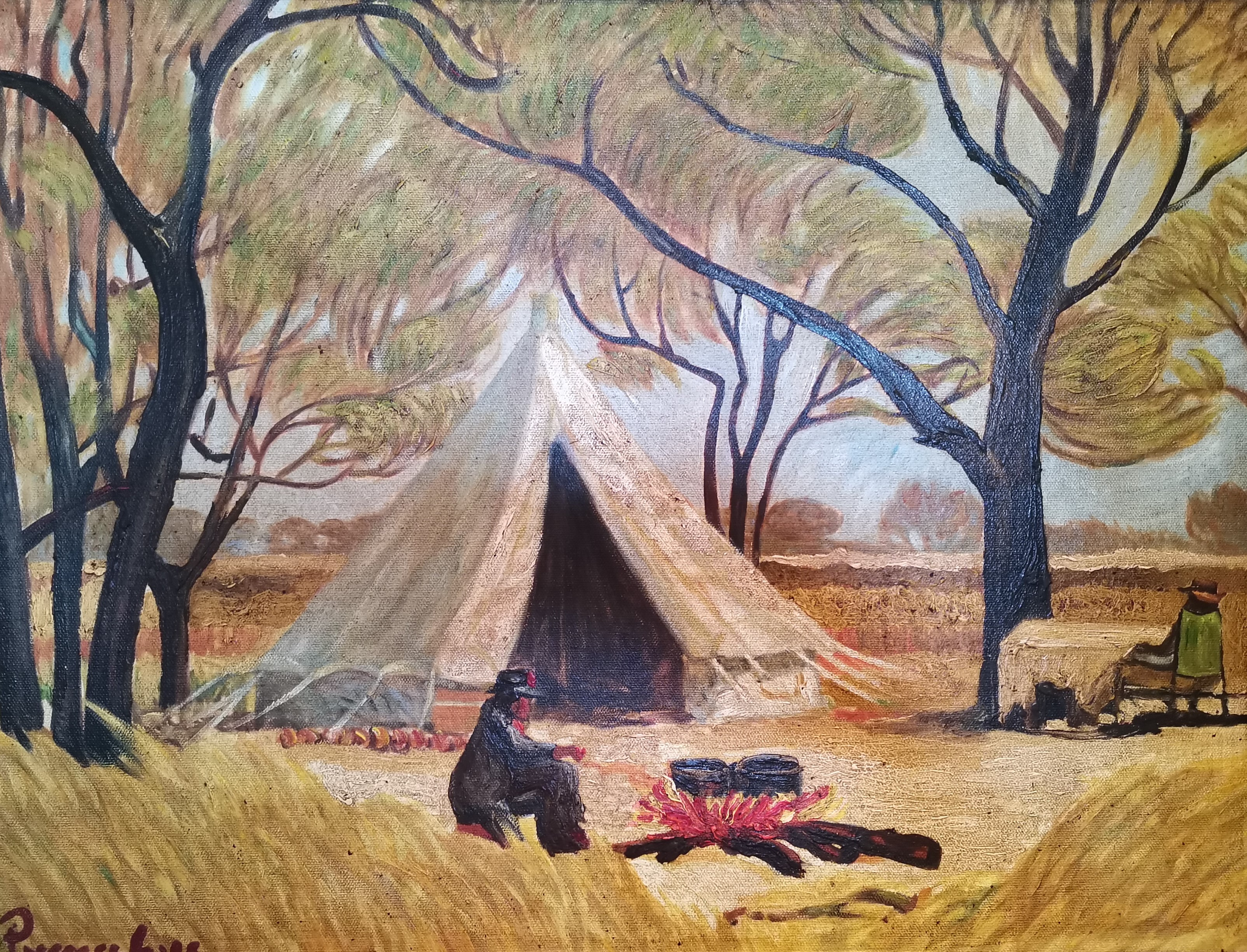
Die Kamp van Van Wouw (1918)

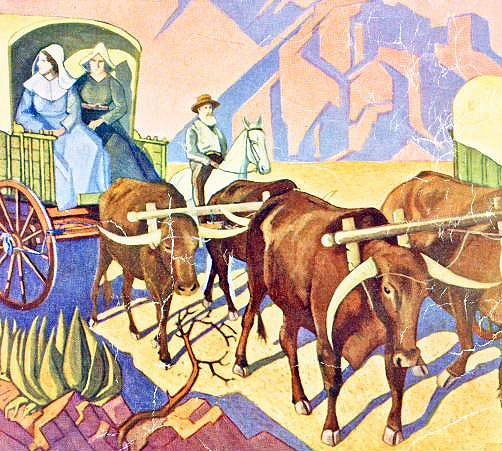
Die Groot Trek (1938)

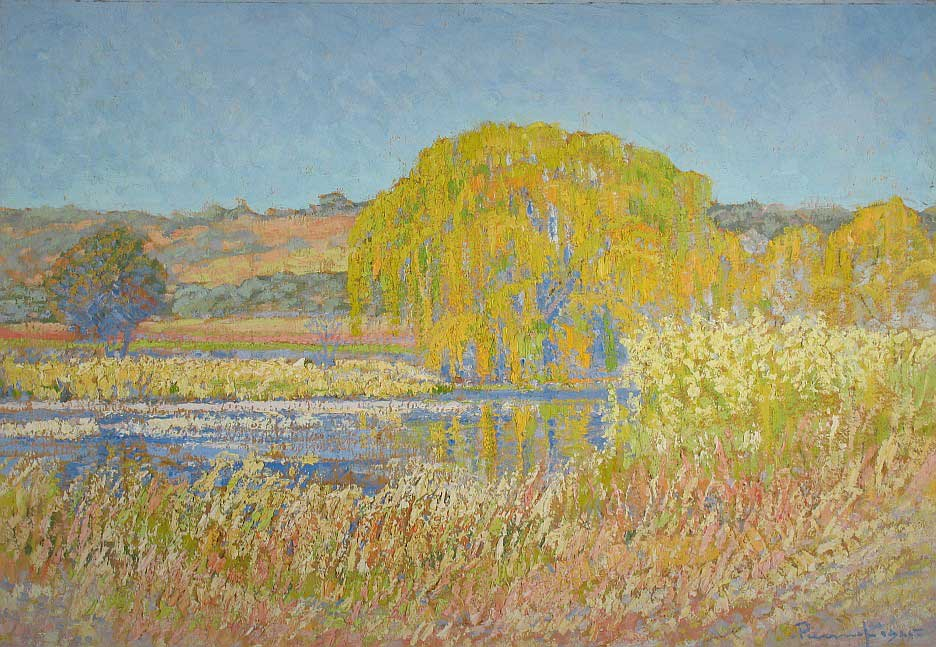
Rooiplaatplaas, Noord-Transvaal – Sonsopkoms (1925)

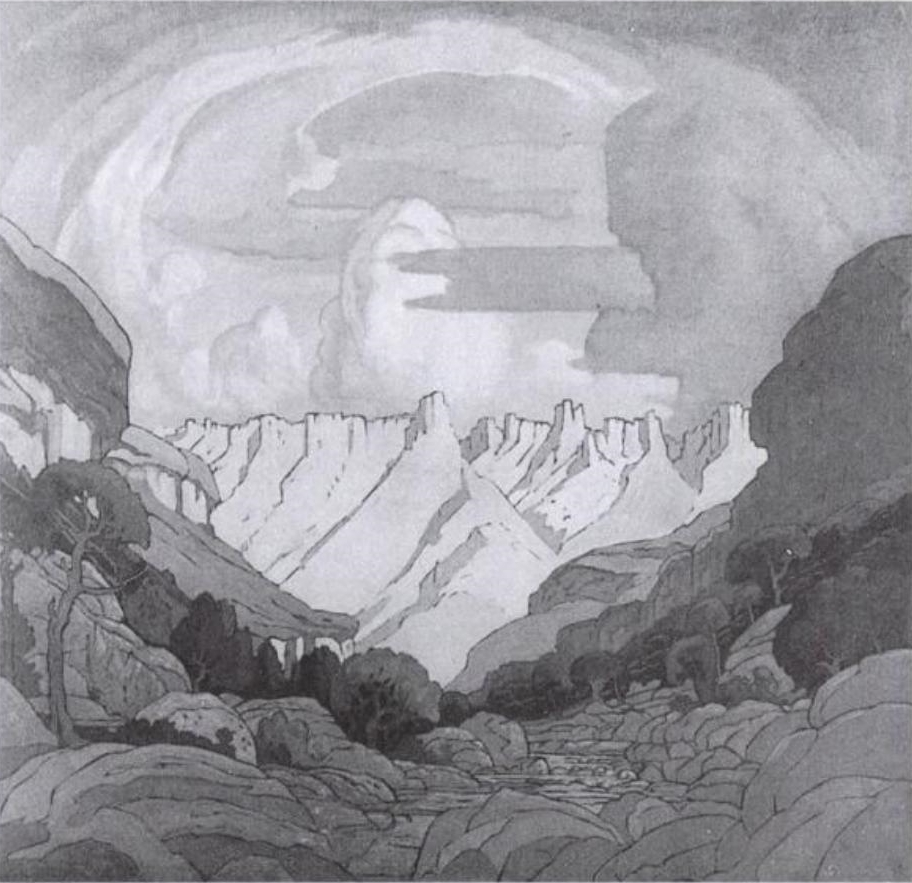
Mont-aux-Sources (1925–1932)

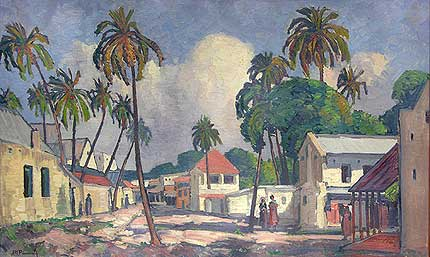
Dar-es-Salaam (1926)

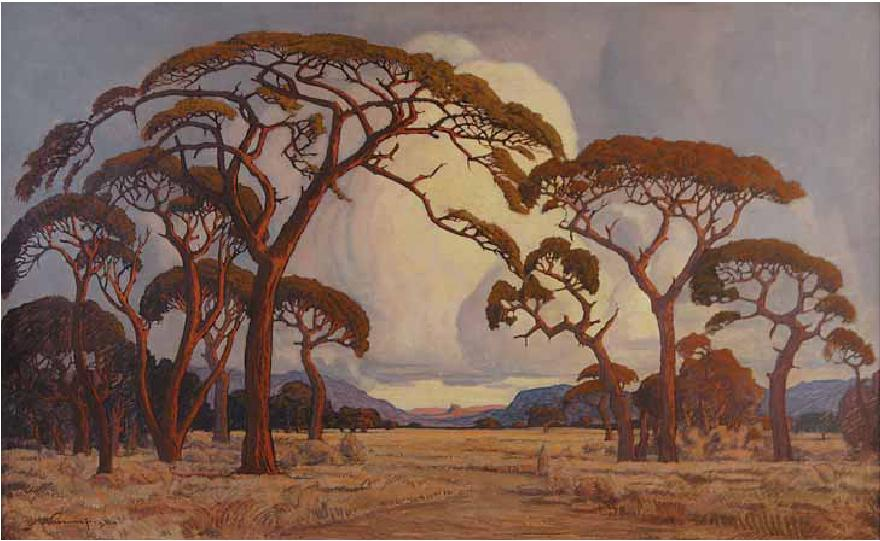
'n Somersmiddag, Bosveld (1928)

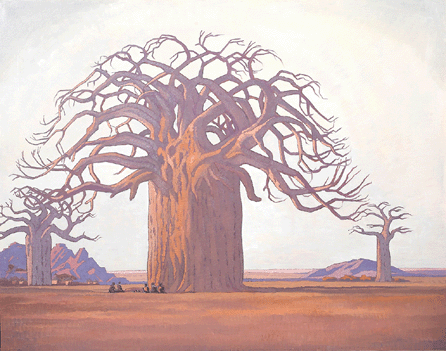
Die Kremetartboom (1934)

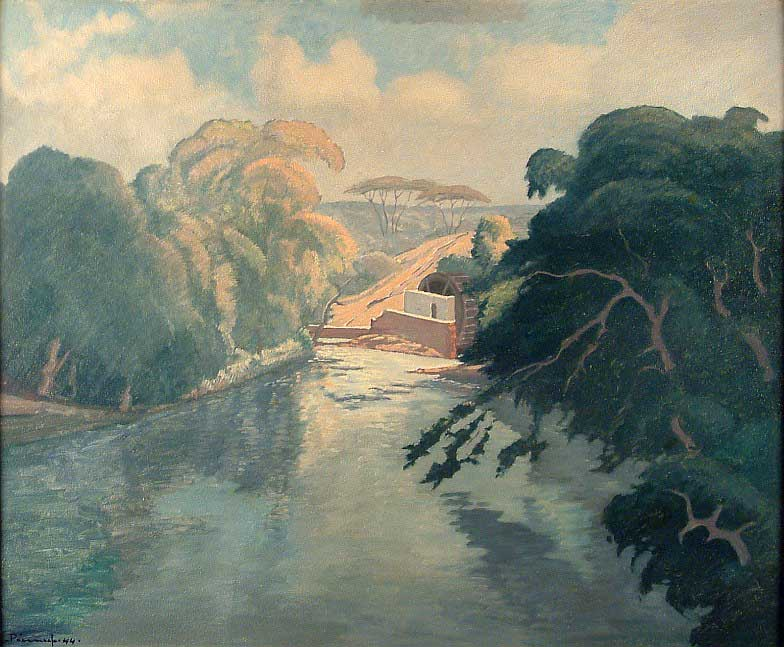
Watermeule naby Stellenbosch (1944)

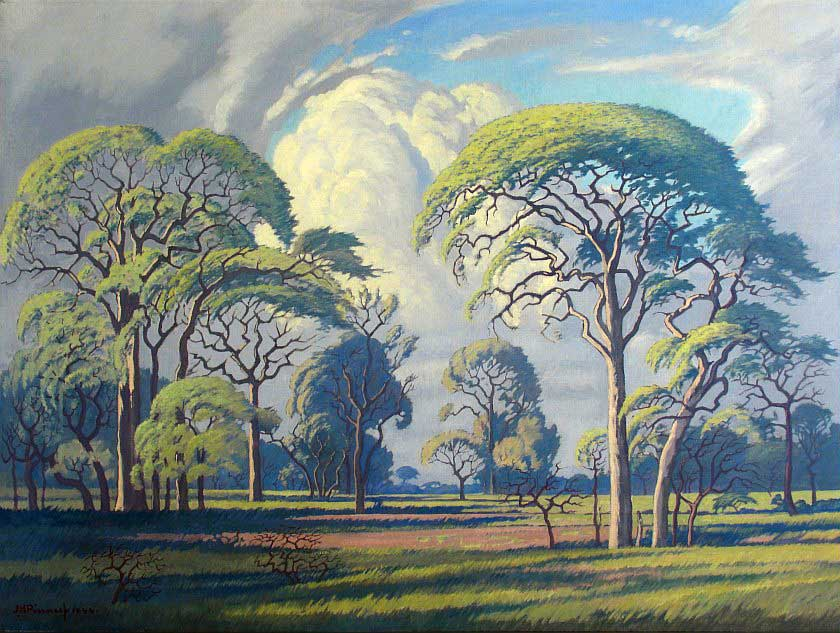
Hardekoolbome – Bosveld (1945)

== Awards ==
Pierneef received numerous honours and awards during his lifetime, including:

- 1935 – The Medal for Visual Arts for his Johannesburg Station Panels as well as for his panels in South Africa House in London.
- 1951 – Honorary Doctorate, University of Natal.
- 1957 – Honorary Doctorate of Philosophy, University of Pretoria.
- 1957 – Honorary Membership of the South African Academy for Science and Art ('’Suid-Afrikaanse Akademie vir Wetenskap en Kuns'’).
