= Pieter Hugo Naudé =

South African painter (1868–1941)

Hugo Naudé
- Born: 1868; Cape Colony
- Died: 1941 (aged 72–73); Worcester
- Occupation: Painter
- Known for: Artwork
- Spouse: Julia Brown

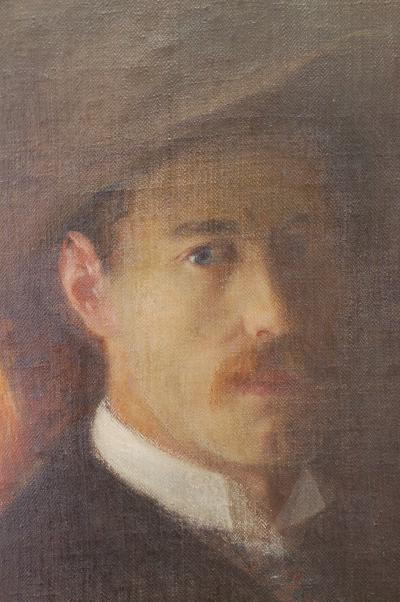
Pieter Hugo Naudé: Youthful self portrait. Hugo Naudé House, Worcester

Pieter Hugo Naudé (1869–1941), better known as Hugo Naudé, was a South African painter.

Hugo Naudé is one of South Africa’s pioneer artists and is largely regarded as the country’s first professional artist.

== Early years ==
Naudé was born and raised on his family's farm, Aan de Doorns, in Worcester, Western Cape – an area whose dramatic landscape inspired much of his output throughout his life.

Naudé showed great artistic talent from a young age and was encouraged by his family to pursue it.

== Biography ==
In 1889 he travelled to London where he trained at the prestigious Slade School of Fine Art, and the following year he continued his studies at the Academy of Fine Arts Munich (AKDB, München). Whilst in Europe, Naudé spent a year in Fontainebleau where he lived and worked amongst the Barbizon School of painters. Just as the French group inspired the likes of Monet in his explorations of Impressionism, they also inspired Naudé to create his own Cape Impressionist style – one which was adopted by generations of artists who followed him, including Gregoire Boonzaier, Pierneef, and Ruth Prowse.

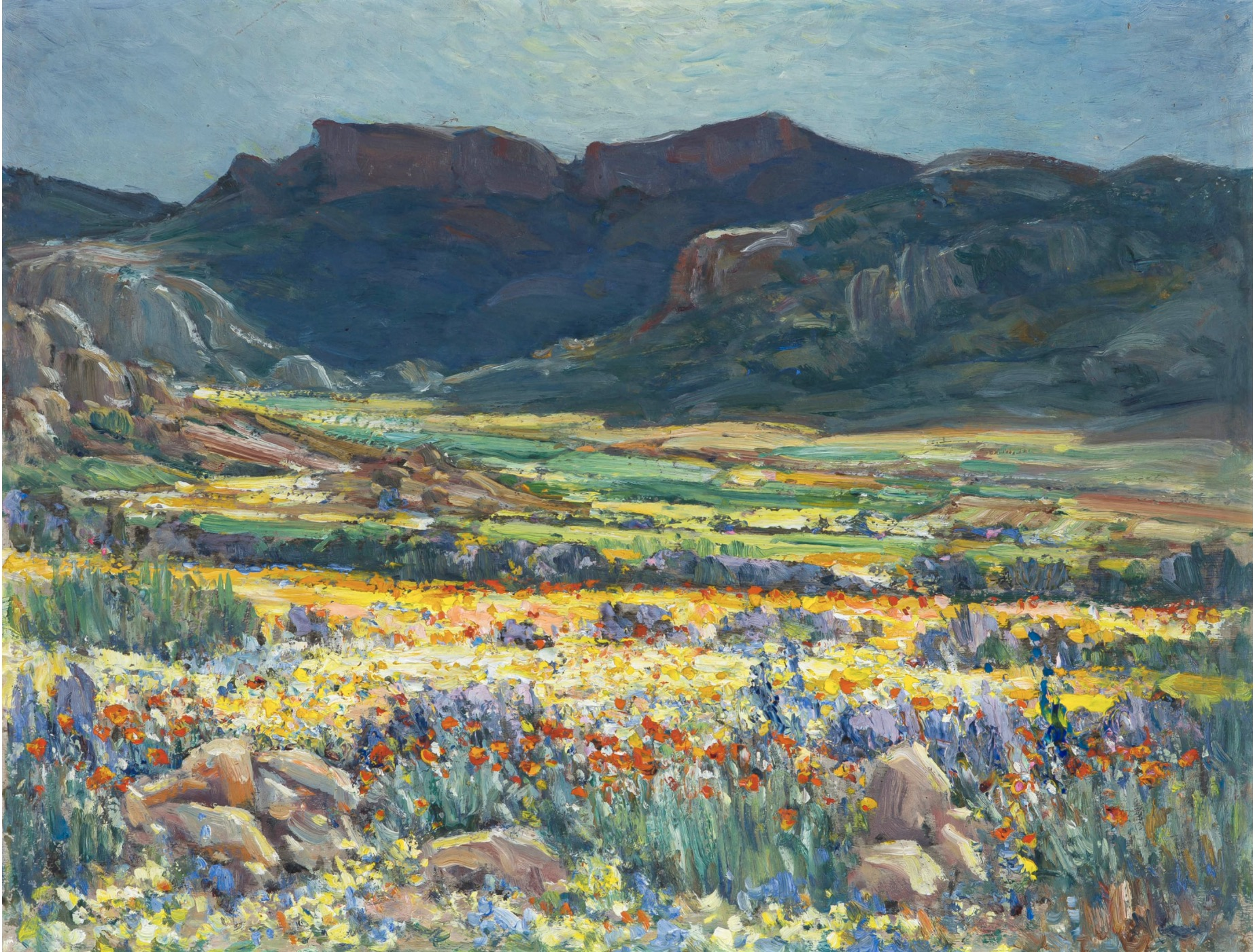
Pieter Hugo Naudé: Namaqualand, Springtime

Upon his return to South Africa in 1896, Naudé adapted his European influences and teachings so as to more accurately reflect the abundance and brilliance of his local landscape. Motivated by his great love for nature and landscape, Naudé travelled by caravan on many painting expeditions across Southern Africa. Painting en plein air with bold hues of yellow and orange below, and clear blue skies above, Naudé captured the landscapes he encountered with great confidence and a unique freshness never-before-seen in his home country. This artistic movement came to be known as Cape Impressionism, represented by several renowned South African Cape painters who developed a style unique to South Africa.

== Career and legacy ==
Over a century later, Naudé’s works continue to be sought after, and his legacy fondly remembered. In 1939, two years before his death, Naudé was awarded the Medal of Honour for painting by the South African Akademie (Suid-Afrikaanse Akademie vir Wetenskap en Kuns). He has been recognized with two retrospective exhibitions, the first in 1969 at the Pretoria Art Museum, and the second at the South African National Gallery in Cape Town in 1974.

== Art Education ==
1889-90: Slade School London, under Alphonse Legros.

1890-94: Kunst Akademie, Munich, under portraitist Franz von Lenbach.

1895: with the Barbizon Group, Fontainebleau.

1913: etching at the Chelsea Arts Club, off King's Road, London; and further study in Munich.
