= Edward Roworth =

South African artist

- Born: 1880; Lancashire
- Died: 1964 (aged 83–84); Somerset West, Western Cape, South Africa
- Education: Slade School of Art
- Occupations: Artist, painter
- Known for: Landscapes and portraits
- Notable work: The first frescoes in South Africa

Edward Roworth (1880 in Lancashire – 1964 Somerset West) was a South African artist.

== Background ==
He studied under Tom Wostyn at Heaton, briefly under Sir Hubert Herkomer at Bushey, and finally under Henry Tonks at the Slade School of Art. He spent some time in Florence studying the art of fresco. He preferred painting the landscapes of the Cape and Natal, often depicting farmhouses. He was adept at producing formal portraits, working happily in oils or pastel. In his heyday Roworth greatly influenced the South African art scene, endorsing a conservative approach.

Edward Roworth arrived in South Africa with British forces during the Anglo-Boer War. With the war over he decided to stay and settled in Cape Town, where he set up a teaching studio. In 1908 he was elected President of the South African Society of Artists, doing so again in 1918–20 and 1933–36. In 1938, he was appointed to the chair of the Michaelis School of Fine Art in Cape Town and held the position until 1953. From 1941 until 1948 he was the director of the South African National Gallery.

In 1909 Roworth was commissioned to produce a painting of the National Convention, a 5m x 6m work depicting the 33 men who were architects of the Union. This work was completed in 1911 whereupon it was displayed in Buckingham Palace, later being installed in the House of Assembly in Cape Town. Roworth's next task was painting, what were possibly the first frescoes in South Africa, in St Phillips Church in Cape Town.

Four paintings by Edward Roworth were burned by demonstrators during the Rhodes Must Fall demonstrations at the University of Cape Town in February 2016 (portraits of Mrs Barnard-Fuller, Doris Spencer Emmet, Anna Maria Tugwell and Jan Smuts). Two other paintings have been removed from UCT in 2016 (portraits of Thomas Benjamin Davie and Theo le Roux); one painting (Portrait of Prof William Ritchie) is missing.
