= Anton van Wouw =

South African sculptor (1862–1945)

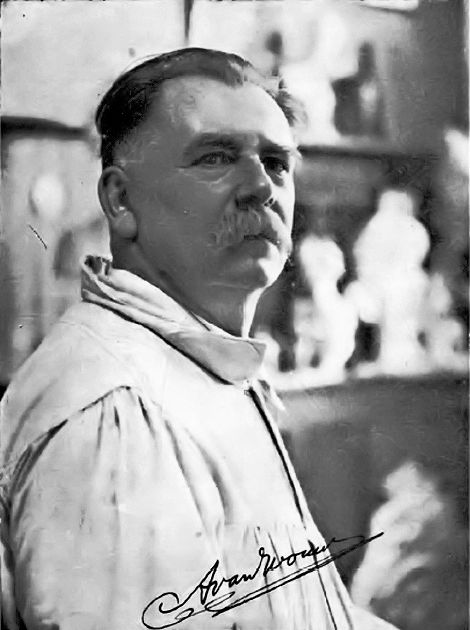
- Anton van Wouw
- Born: 27 December 1862; Driebergen, Netherlands
- Died: 30 June 1945 (aged 82); Pretoria, Union of South Africa

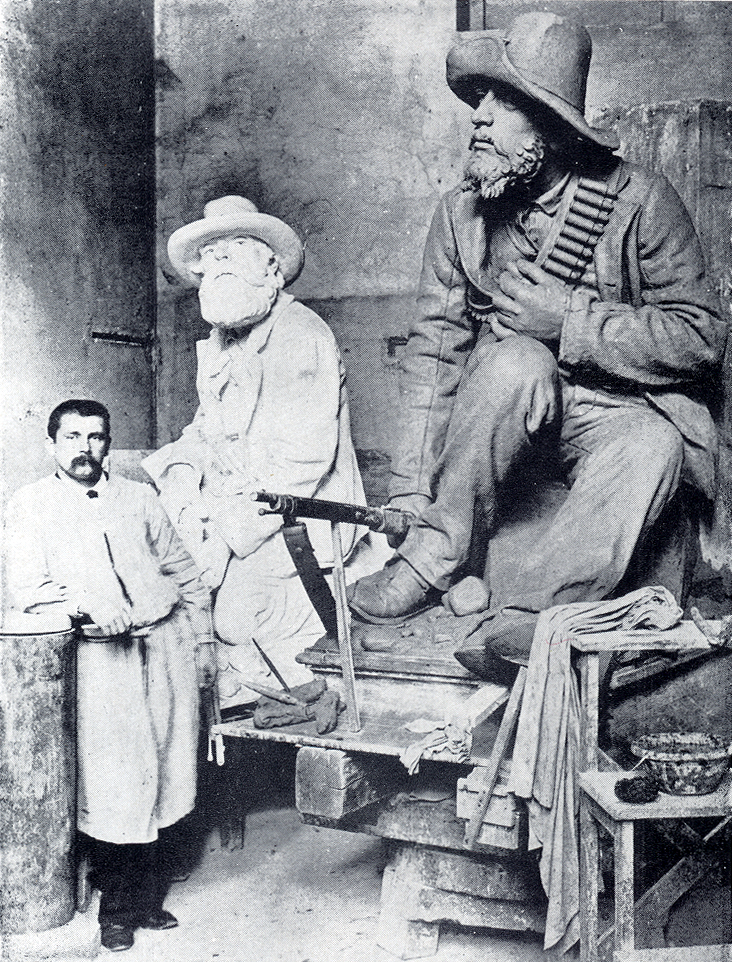
Anton van Wouw in Rome, c. 1896–1899

Anton van Wouw (27 December 1862 – 30 July 1945) was a Dutch-born South African sculptor regarded as the father of South African sculpture.

== Biography ==
Van Wouw decided to move to the developing city of Pretoria at the age of 28 and waited for ten years to receive his first commission. This was from financier Sammy Marks to create a monumental statue of Paul Kruger, which stands at Church Square in Pretoria to this day.

During his time spent in the wilderness he developed a great admiration for the Boer nation. This also influenced his artistic development a great deal. He identified with the struggles and hopes of these people and this commitment was reflected in his work.

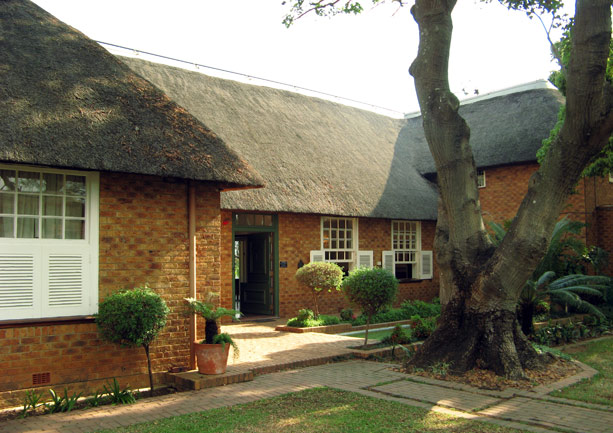
Anton van Wouw House, Pretoria

A great deal of his work, although representational, captures the rugged and emotional essence of his subjects. One of his most notable pieces of work is at the National Women's Monument in Bloemfontein. He collaborated on this with the architect Frans Soff. He was also responsible for the less successful figure of a woman incorporated into the Voortrekker Monument near Pretoria, a powerful bust of General Christiaan de Wet and the statue of Louis Botha in Durban.

He portrayed indigenous peoples and among these smaller sculptures some of his work can be found. They are much less formal than his larger work and have realistic facial expressions.

== Works ==
Woman and Children, completed in 1938. This bronze statue honouring the role the Voortrekker women played in the Great Trek was van Wouw's last commission. The sculpture is located at the base of the Voortrekker Monument in Pretoria, stands 4.1 meters tall and weights 2.5 tons. The casting was done by Renzo Vignali in Pretoria. Models for the statue were Cato Roorda or Isabel Snyman as the woman, Betty Wolk as the girl and Joseph Goldstein as the boy.

== Museum ==
- Van Wouw Museum located in his final residence.

== Gallery ==
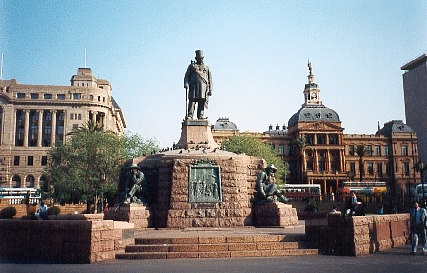
Statue of Paul Kruger, 1899, on Church Square, Pretoria

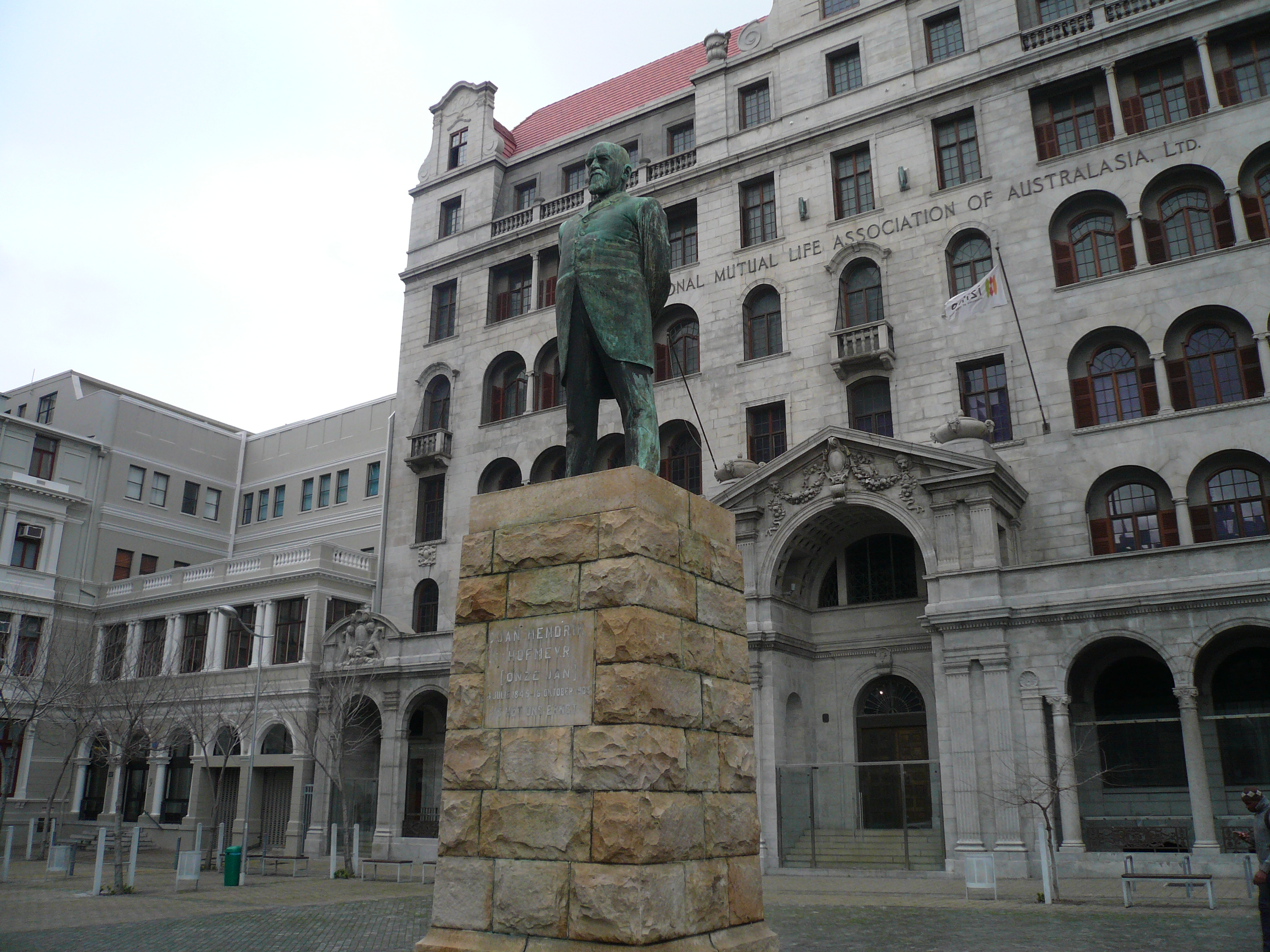
Statue of Jan Hendrik Hofmeyr, 1916, Church Square, Cape Town

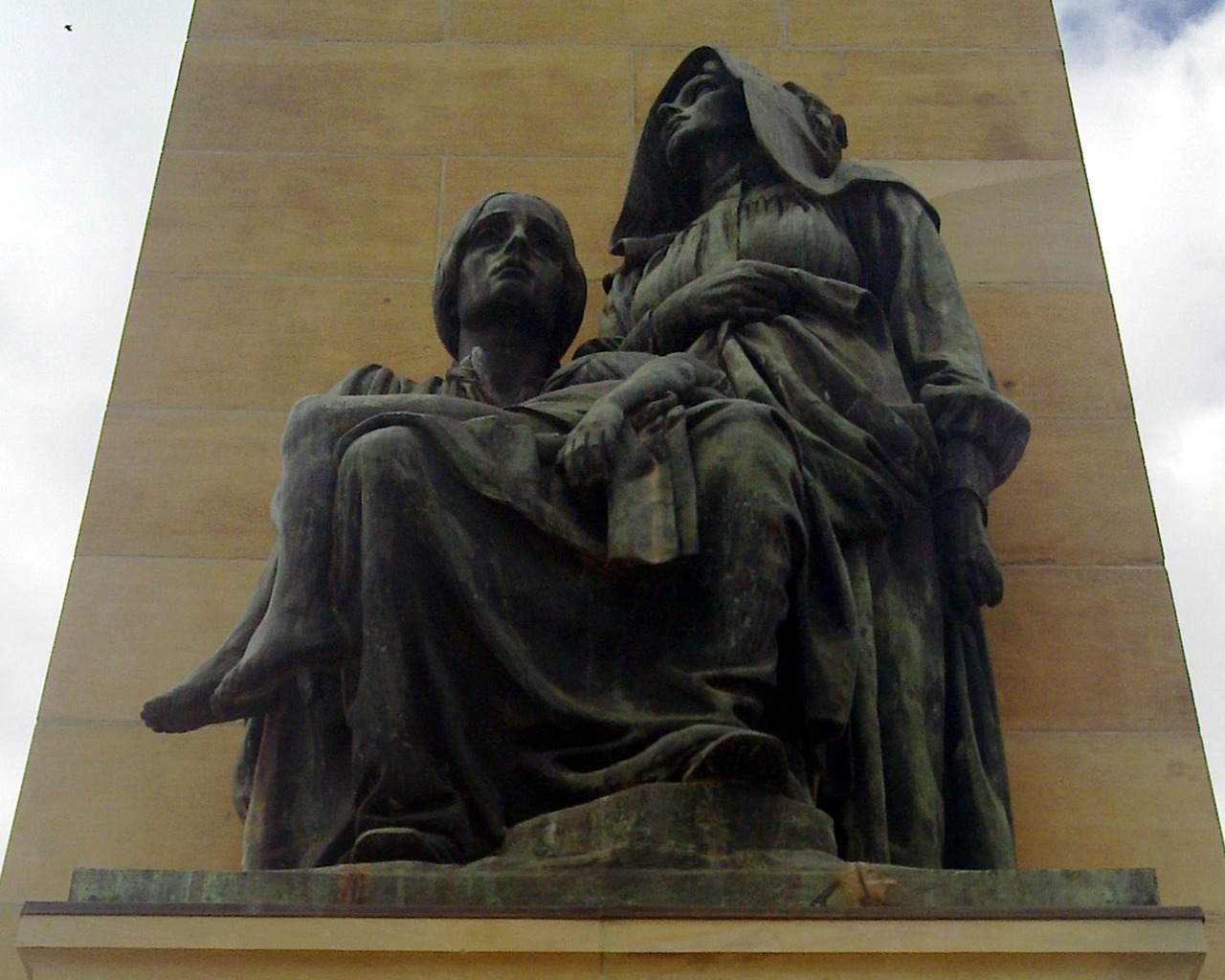
A woman carrying a dying child at a concentration camp.One of Anton's work at the National Women's Monument, Bloemfontein,1916

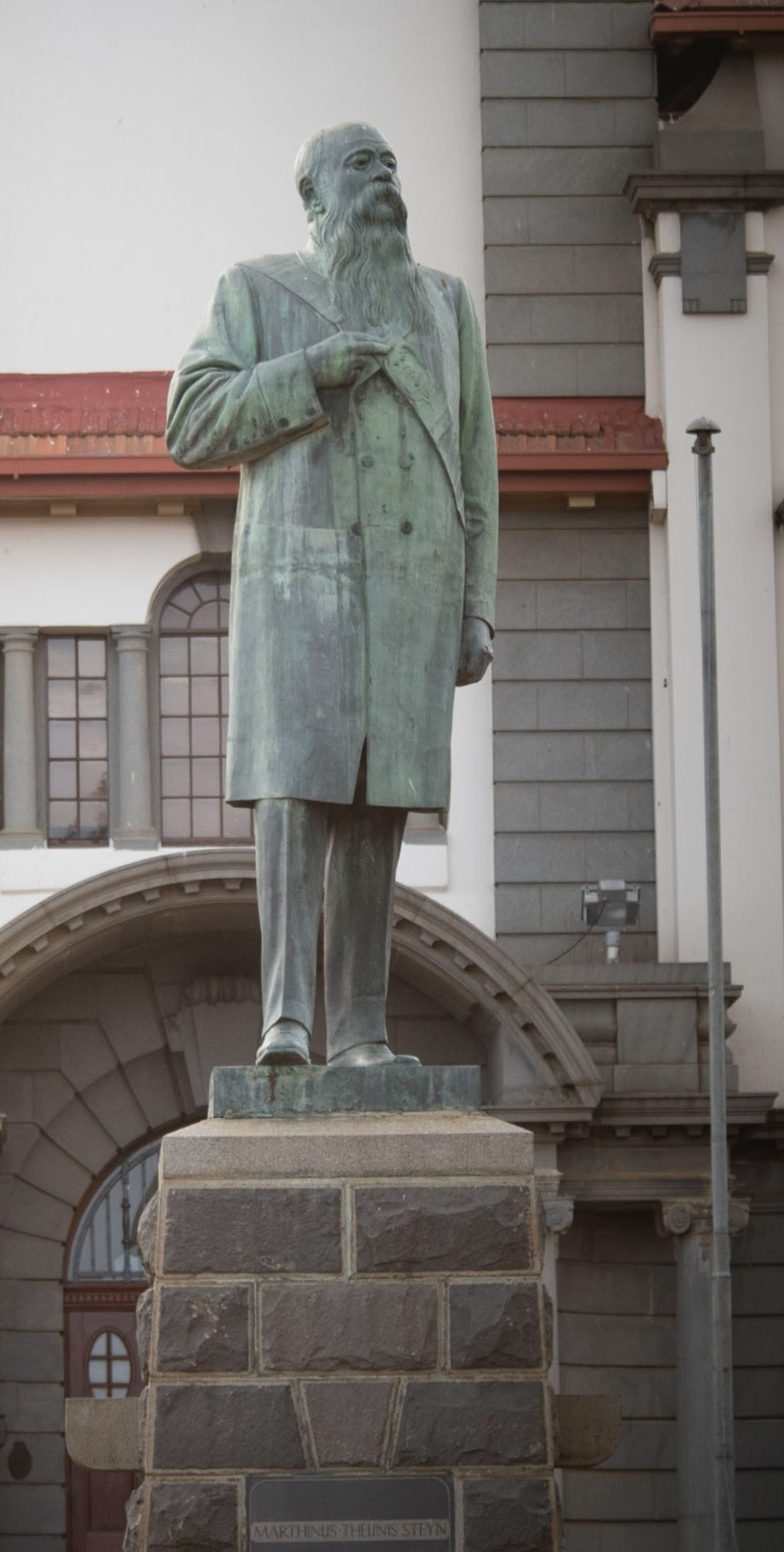
Statue of Martinus Theunis Steyn, 1928, for the University of the Free State, moved to the Museum of the Boer Republics in 2020

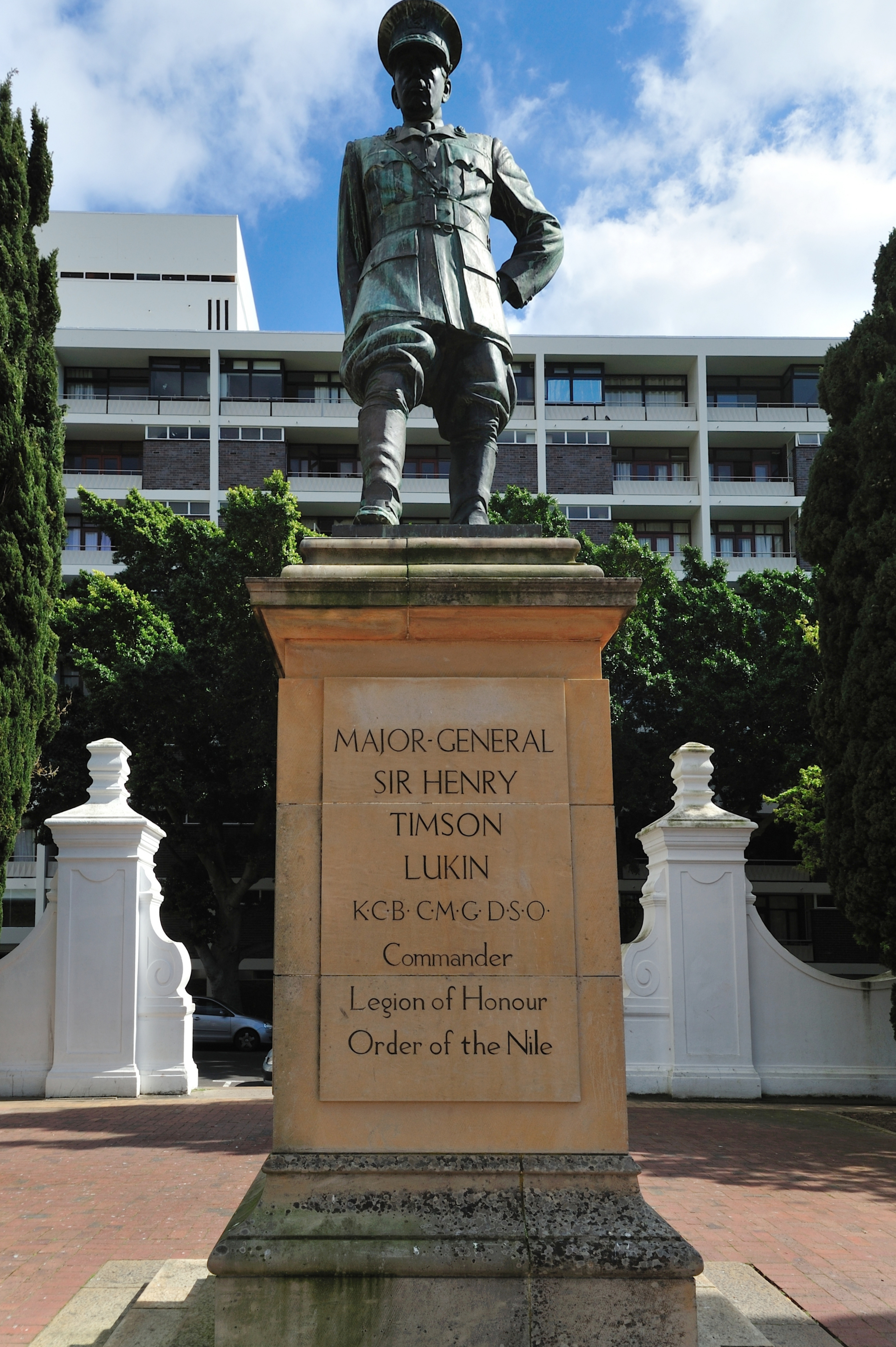
Major General Sir Henry Timson Lukin, 1930, Cape Town

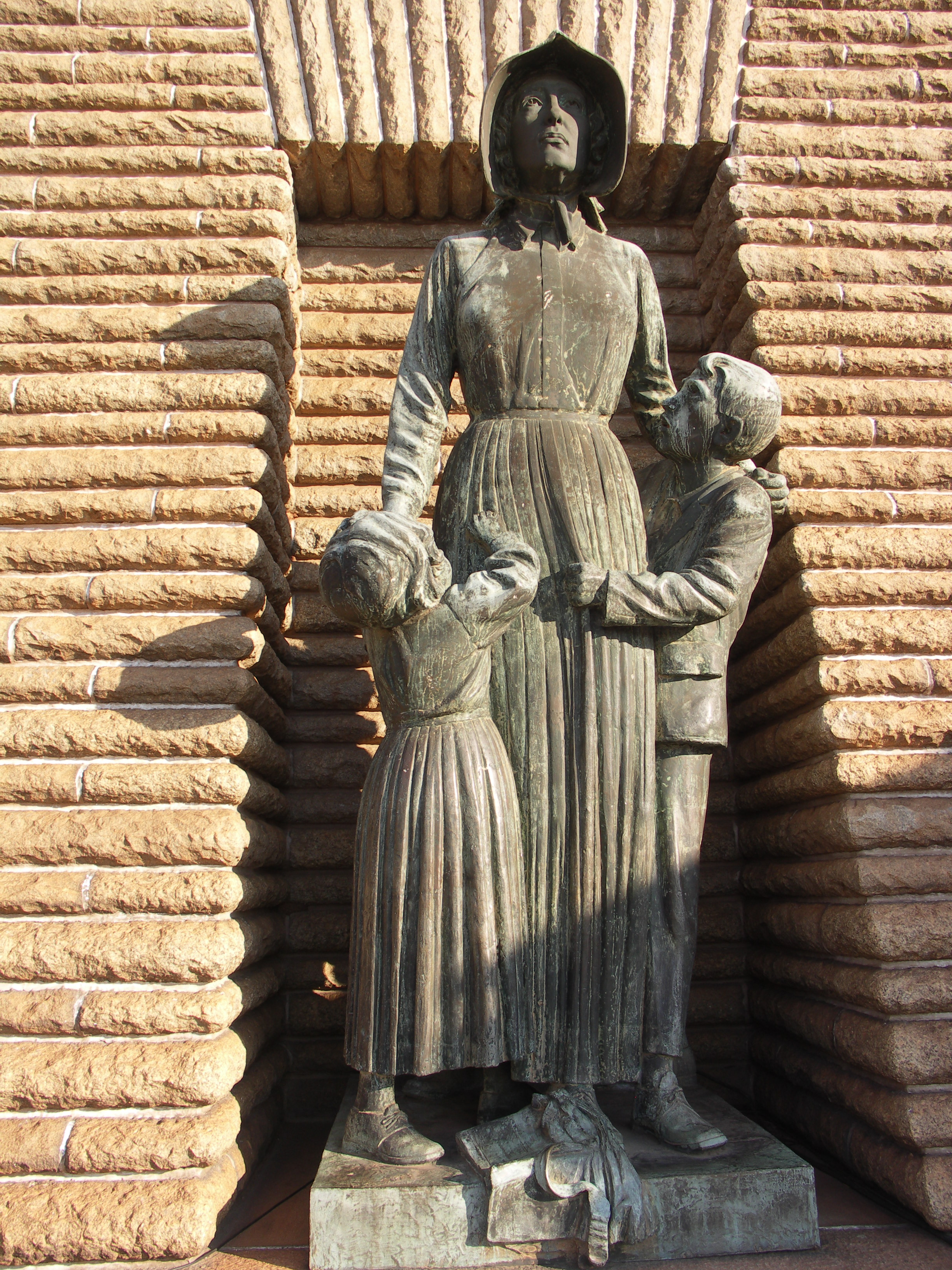
Woman and Children, 1939, Voortrekker Monument

== See also ==
- Van Wouw Museum
- The spatial symbolism of the Voortrekker Monument
