= Statue of Martinus Theunis Steyn =

Statue in Bloemfontein, South Africa

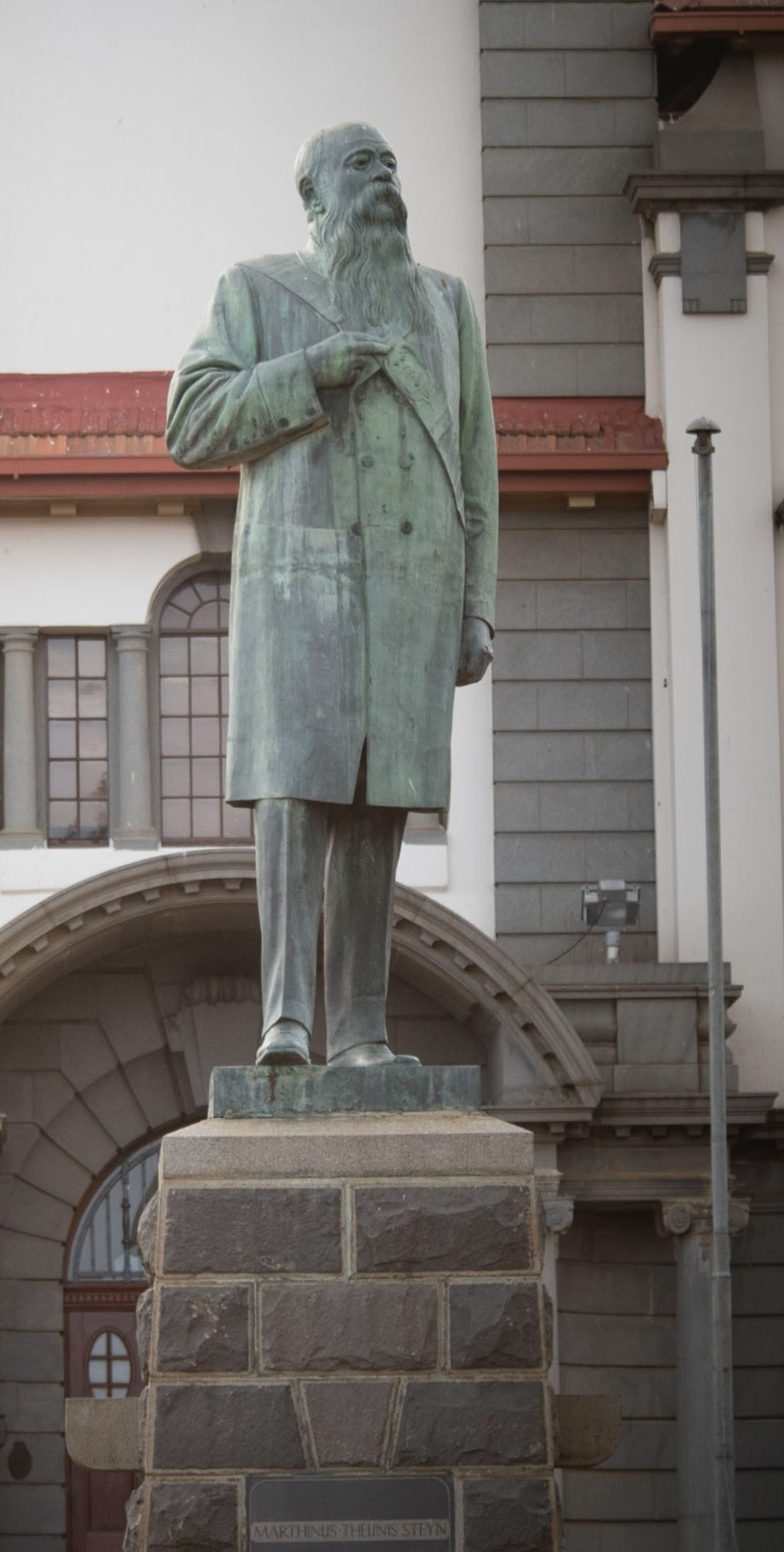
- Subject: Martinus Theunis Steyn
- Location: University of the Free State; Bloemfontein, South Africa

A statue of Martinus Theunis Steyn was installed at the University of the Free State, in Bloemfontein, South Africa, until 2020 when it was relocated to the Anglo-Boer War Museum

== Description and history ==
In honour to the fact that Steyn had worked diligently for an indigenous Free State University during the years before the Anglo-Boer War, and the desire of the Afrikaanse Studentebond to inspire young Afrikaners to take up leadership in South Africa, it was decided to erect a statue at the University of the Free State.

Before the statue was built, a period of 12 years was dedicated to the planning and funding thereof. The statue was erected with funds collected by the Afrikaner Studentebond. The statue was constructed by the praised, Dutch-born sculptor, Anton van Wouw. Steyn is presented as a person of reflection as well as a person that commands respect. The size of the statue is 2:1 and is mounted on a base built from local stone. The statue was unveiled on 28 September 1929.

In April 2015, the University of the Free State, under leadership of UFS Rector and Vice-Chancellor, Prof. Jonathan Jansen, led a three-day discussion session about the role and place of statues, symbols, and signs at the university. Speaking about the statue, Jansen stated that the discourse on transformation was not about only one person's memories, but about everyone's in the country.

In 2018, the university targeted the statue as a priority to be dealt with according to its Integrated Transformation Plan (ITP). In November, the Rector and Vice-Chancellor, Prof Francis Petersen, stated that a large portion of the student body felt unwelcome near the statue and that a “Special Task Team” found that there could be no historical reinterpretation of the statue and that it should therefore be relocated. Although according to the National Museum in Bloemfontein the current location on campus is important because "President Steyn embodies the ideal of the establishment of a Free State university".

The statue was dismantled in June 2020 and reassembled at the Anglo-Boer War Museum (also known as The War Museum of the Boer Republics) under oversight of a heritage architect in August 2020. The statue is situated 200 metre from the National Women's Monument near the graves of Steyn and his wife, Tibbie.
