= The Covenant (novel) =

1980 novel by James A. Michener

- First edition cover
- Author: James A. Michener
- Language: English
- Genre: Historical novel
- Publisher: Random House
- Publication date: 1980
- Publication place: United States
- Media type: Print (hardback)
- Pages: 879 pp
- ISBN: 0-394-50505-0

The Covenant is a historical novel by American author James A. Michener, published in 1980.

== Overview ==
The novel is set in South Africa, home to five distinct populations: Bantu (native Black tribes), Coloured (the result of generations of racial mixture between persons of European descent and the indigenous occupants of South Africa along with slaves brought in from Angola, Indonesia, India, Madagascar and the east Coast of Africa), British, Afrikaner, and Indian, Chinese, and other foreign workers. The novel traces the history, interaction, and conflicts between these populations, from prehistoric times up to the 1970s.

== Chapters ==
The text is divided into 14 chapters, each accompanied by local fauna (which sometimes feature in the events of that chapter):

1. "Prologue" (Eland): Set circa 13,000 BC, it follows a wandering group of San, including their hunting and cave painting practices.
2. "Zimbabwe" (Rhinoceros): Starting in 1453, it covers the culture of areas economically connected to Great Zimbabwe, including Arab traders.
3. "A Hedge of Bitter Almond" (Hippopotamus): Covers the Portuguese explorations east via Africa in the 1490s, European rivalry over the Spice Islands, and the founding of the Cape Colony.
4. "The Huguenots" (Leopard): Details the 17th-century intermingling of African, Asian and European cultures in the colony, including the arrival of French religious refugees and the founding of the wine industry.
5. "The Trekboers" (Hyena): Follows the 18th-century expansion of the colony as Boers are drawn to the open farmlands to the east (and conflicts with the Xhosa) as authorities seek to organise legal and religious control.
6. “The Missionary” (Wildebeest): Covers the 19th-century British takeover of the colony, Black Circuit courts and the events at Slagter’s Nek, the confrontation at Grahamstown, the missionary work of the LMS, and arrival of English settlers.
7. "Mfecane" (Lion): Details the lifestyles of the various tribes in the Natal region, particularly the Zulu. It focuses on the rise of Shaka, his military reforms, the expansion of the Zulu state from 1816, and the anguish of the Mfecane.
8. "The Voortrekkers" (Sable Antelope): Follows the ongoing tensions, into the 1830s, of the settlers and the Xhosa. The passing of the Slavery Abolition Act then led to increased dissatisfaction culminating in the Great Trek and conflicts with Mzilikazi and Dingane.
9. "The Englishmen" (Zebra): Details the disastrous prophecy of Nongqause in the 1850s. It also covers Prince Alfred's visit, the arrival of Indian workers, the diamond rush, and a botched raid. It also details the 1890s politics of Cecil Rhodes and Paul Kruger.
10. "The Venloo Commando" (Basuto Pony): Introduces figures around the Second Boer War such as Buller, Botha, Churchill, Gandhi, Kitchener, and Roberts. Events include the battles of Ladysmith, Spion Kop, and Vaal Krantz, alongside blockhouses and concentration camps.
11. "Education of a Puritan" (Springbok): Details the decades after 1902 when Afrikaner nationalism begins among the defeated Boers. Includes antagonism to English and Dutch languages, the eviction of Chinese labourers, the founding of the ANC, a failed pro-German uprising, and rising popularity of rugby and cricket.
12. "Achievement of a Puritan" (Elephant): In the leadup to the 1961 Republic, Afrikaners continue to work on their vision of a nation. Covers the 1920 Johannesburg riot, tsotsis gangs, the Broederbond, the 1938 Trek, the 1947 royal visit, the 1948 election, racial legislation, Sharpeville, and the Verwoerd assassination.
13. "Apartheid" (Cape Buffalo): Covers life under apartheid, including the Racial Classification Board, the 1955 demolition of Sophiatown, the impending clearance of Pageview, the Black Sash movement, life in the gold mines, BOSS and extrajudicial murders, and Robben Island.
14. "Diamonds" (Giraffe): Details life in the 1970s, starting with the strictures around diamond prospecting and the diamond monopoly. It also introduces life in the Bantustans and Soweto. It explores banning, a trial, and emigration, and speculates on the future (i.e., post-1980) course of the nation.

== Themes ==
Michener writes largely from the point of view of the Afrikaners, descendants of Dutch settlers, German immigrants, and French Huguenots who traveled to South Africa to practice freedom of worship in the Calvinist tradition, and other European groups, all of whom were absorbed by the Afrikaans-speaking Dutch Reformed Church.

The Afrikaners, whose Dutch ancestors first established a trading and resupply stop at Cape Town in the 17th century to service ships moving between Holland and Java, considered themselves the "New Israelites". They found in the Old Testament verification for their belief that God favored their conquest of the new land.

Their strict, fundamentalist interpretation of the Bible supported them through the Great Trek of the 19th century; battles against Zulu and other Bantu tribes, who also laid claim to lands to the north; the Anglo-Boer War (when after the British won the war on the conventional battlefield and took all the main Boer towns and cities, a few Boer commandos of a few hundred Afrikaner farmers continued to hold out in isolated pockets of the veld until the cessation of hostilities, despite tens of thousands of British regulars combing the countryside in pursuit of them); and their institution of Apartheid in the 20th century, when they insisted on racial purity, separatism, and white supremacy, per the moral expectations of the God of Israel in the Old Testament and their own determination to keep political power in the hands of White Africans of European descent.

Both historical and fictional characters appear throughout the novel. The experiences of the fictional van Doorn family illustrate the Dutch and Huguenot heritage of South Africa, and in the 1970s also illustrate the differences between liberal and conservative Afrikaners. The fictional Saltwood family represents the English settlement of the area. The Nxumalo family illustrates the area's black heritage and culture. African Zulu leader Shaka appears in the novel, during the chapter on the Mfecane.

Michener suggests that the Afrikaner oppression of Blacks was partly due to Dutch animosity towards the English, who assumed political and financial control of southern Africa in 1795 and fought against the traditional way of life, including slavery, pursued by Afrikaner farmers, or Boers. As one Bantu character observes, "no matter whether the English or the Dutch win, the Blacks always lose."

Having been written before 1994, the book keeps the outlook of a time when the Apartheid regime was still strong and no one knew when and how it would end. Though Michener lived to see the end of Apartheid and the election of Nelson Mandela as President of South Africa, by then he was too old and ill to undertake a revision of the book and the addition of a final chapter.
