= Anglo-Boer War Museum =

Military museum in Bloemfontein, South Africa

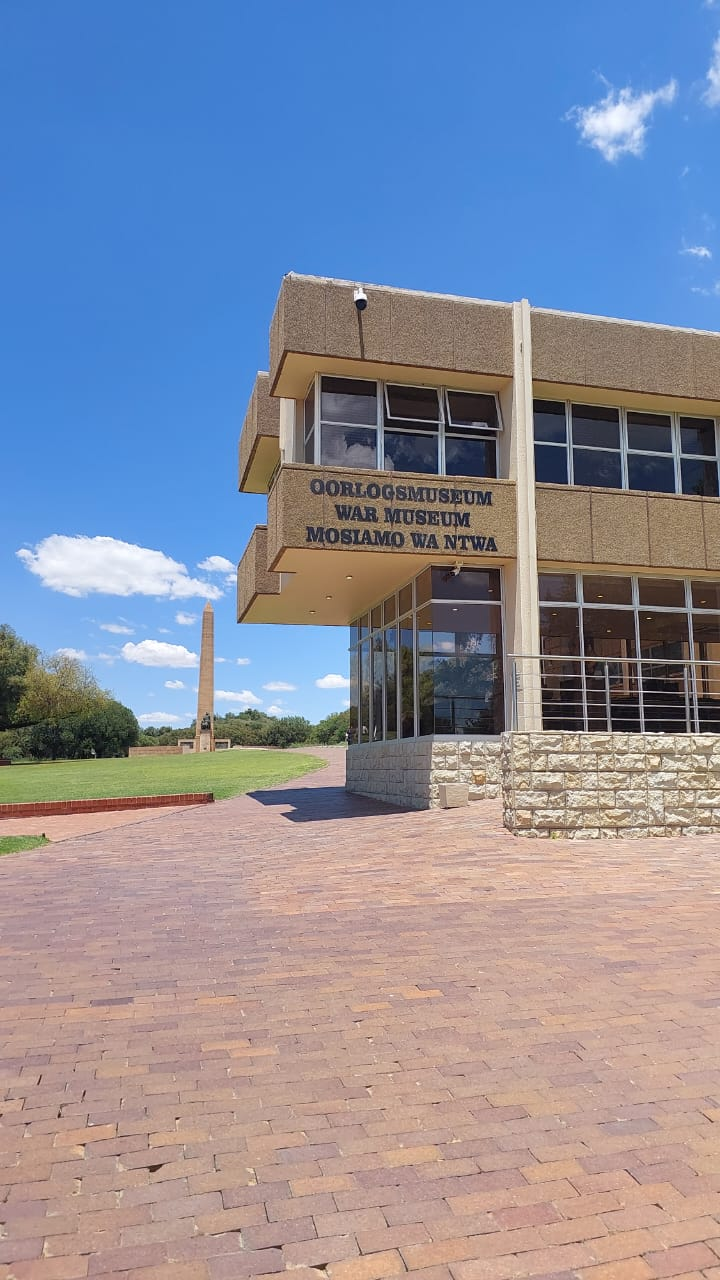
- Front view, with the National Women's Memorial in the background
- Established: 30 September 1931
- Location: Bloemfontein, South Africa
- Coordinates: 29.1406°S 26.2086°E
- Type: Military / War Museum
- Director: Tokkie Pretorius
- Website: www.anglo-boer.co.za

The Anglo-Boer War Museum (War Museum for short) is also known officially as the War Museum of the Boer Republics in Bloemfontein. It is the only museum in the world dedicated solely to the Anglo-Boer Wars (South African War) of 1899 to 1902. The museum has a unique art collection, dioramas and exhibits but also brings the visitor closer to understanding the background against which the war took place. The National Women's Monument dedicated to all women and children is situated at the same location and was unveiled in 1913.

== History of the museum ==
Women's Monument 1913

The establishment of the War Museum of the Boer Republics in Bloemfontein is synonymous with the creation of the National Women's Monument. The suffering and hardship endured by women and children during the Anglo-Boer War made such an impression on President M.T. Steyn that, in 1905, he resolved to honour them by erecting a monument in their memory. Following a meeting in 1906 at the Steyn family farm, Onze Rust, outside Bloemfontein, a special committee was appointed to pursue the matter further.

The idea of a monument dedicated to those who had perished in the concentration camps and on the battlefield found widespread support, particularly among Afrikaners, and collection lists were circulated across the country in February 1907. Although most contributions were gathered in the form of pennies, sufficient funds were soon available to begin considering design proposals for such a monument. The final choice was the design submitted by a Pretoria architect, Frans Soff, in collaboration with the sculptor Anton van Wouw. Their plan featured an obelisk with two side panels, enclosed within a circular wall. The design was completed with a central bronze sculpture group, as well as two side panels created by Van Wouw.

By 1911, it was reported that approximately £10,236 had been raised, enabling construction to commence under the contractors Medlin & Lehman. The monument, which would thereafter be known as the National Women's Monument, was unveiled on 13 December 1913 by Mrs Rachel Isabella Steyn, wife of President Steyn, on behalf of Miss Emily Hobhouse.

The Commission, which would later become known as the National Women's Monument Commission, began over the following years to receive donated items related to the Anglo-Boer War from the public. This in turn led to the idea of erecting a museum near the monument where all such war-related items could be collected, preserved, and displayed. To investigate the feasibility of this need a committee consisting of members of the National Women's Monument Commission was established.

Funds for the construction of such a building were lacking, however, individuals such as Mr Gordon Fraser, the secretary of the National Women's Monument Commission, felt so strongly about the matter that he began energetically raising the necessary money for the project. His success was such that plans for a design in harmony with the Monument could soon be requested. For this, Frans Soff was once again approached. His design incorporated sandstone elements with several stepped gables reminiscent of Flemish architecture, slate roof tiles complementing the Monument's bronze work, and a rounded sandstone veranda that echoed the Monument's circular wall. Although some members of the public were dissatisfied that the design was once again produced by an “outsider,” the proposal nevertheless found strong favour among the members of the commission, who judged that Soff's design fitted well with the Monument and its surroundings.

On 26 October 1929, Die Volksblad officially reported that the proposed museum was another step closer to reality, as the National Women's Monument Commission had invited tenders for the construction of the building. According to Die Volksblad the building would, in addition to exhibitions, also serve “as a repository for antiquities” from the Anglo-Boer War and would even include a reading room with literature on the war.

A few critics objected that such a reading room was far too remote from the city to be properly utilised by researchers. As for the exact location of the new building, the Commission at that stage had not yet reached certainty, although reports suggested that it would be erected on the slope of the hill west of the road leading to the Monument. On 23 December 1929, a building committee was appointed by the National Women's Monument Commission, consisting of Prof. Rev. J.D. Kestell, Senator W.J.C. Brebner, and Messrs Gordon Fraser and H.J. Otto, to oversee the project. This committee recommended that the tender of Mr W.W. Peffers, a well-known Bloemfontein contractor, be accepted. Mr Peffers intended to begin construction at the start of January 1930 with a total cost of approximately £10,000.

Specifications highlighted by the architect in the design of the “brick buildings” included sandstone elements in certain aspects such as “stone lintels, stone corners, pillars, the stone veranda walls and steps,” all of which were to be made of sandstone. This sandstone was obtained from the same quarry at Kroonstad as that used for the Monument. Provision was also made for a director's apartment on the southern side of the building, which was to include a stove for the small kitchen, as well as wire mesh against possible break-ins to be fitted in front of the windows of the main hall. The new building, erected to the north of the Monument, offered through its Burmese teak sliding windows a view of the vast Free State grasslands stretching east of the city.

1930 – 2009:

The laying of the foundation stone of the new building took place on Saturday, 26 April 1930 at 11:00. Proceedings began with choral singing under the direction of Mrs Daisy Bosman, after which Rev. J.D. Kestell, who led the ceremony, offered a moving prayer and Psalm 146 was sung. Senator W.J.C. Brebner, the oldest member of the Women's Monument Commission, was then requested to lay the foundation stone of the museum building in the presence of a crowd, including many pupils from the Oranje Girls’ School. According to a correspondent of Die Volksblad, he performed this task skilfully and declared afterwards that the stone was “well and firmly laid.” Construction continued, and the building, which was officially known from 4 June 1930 as the “War Museum,” was completed by the end of July 1930.

Attention then turned to furnishing the main hall, installing display cases, bookcases, and other finishing touches, as well as acquiring further items and funds for the new museum. One of the largest collections of war-related items offered to the Commission shortly afterwards came from Mr Fred Oudschans-Dentz of the Netherlands. In addition, he began collecting further items relating to the war in Europe on behalf of the Commission, sending them in several consignments to Bloemfontein. Dr Oscar Hintrager, formerly secretary of the Deutsche Burenhilfe, also donated his collection of war items to the new museum. Soon afterwards, Dr Otto Kraus presented his extensive photographic collection of the war to the museum.

Opening of the Museum

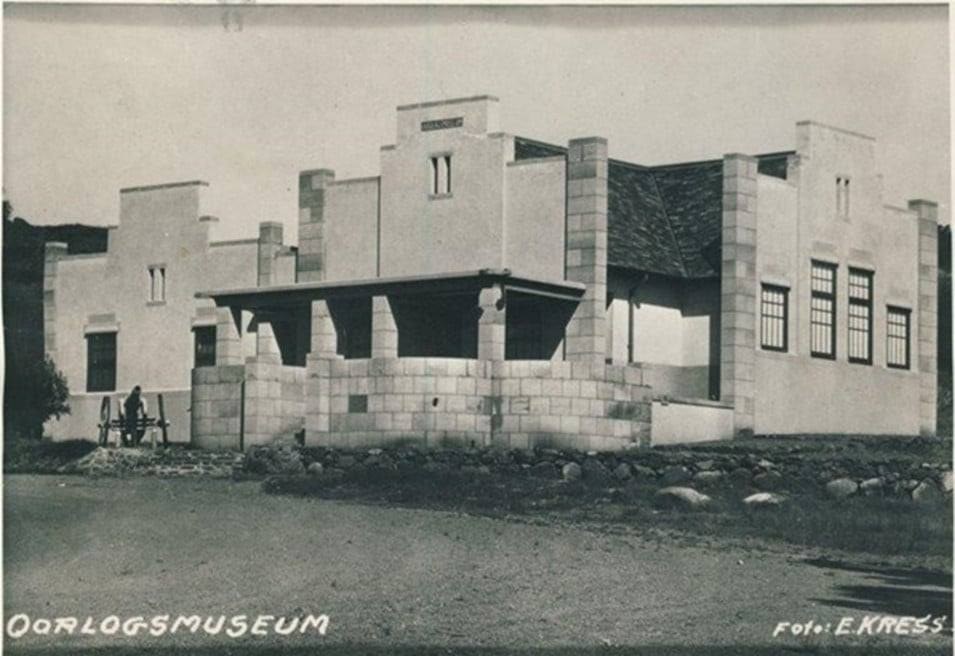
Anglo-Boer War Museum building in 1931

On 17 September 1931 it was announced that the Museum would be officially opened on 30 September 1931 by General J.B.M. Hertzog, then Prime Minister of the Union of South Africa. Among those attending would be Mr C.T.M. Wilcocks, Administrator of the Free State, Dr N.J. van der Merwe, son-in-law of the late President M.T. Steyn, Dr S.H. Pellissier, Director of Education, and Dr Otto Krause. All these arrangements were overseen by Mr Ben van Rensburg, successor to Mr Gordon Fraser and the new secretary of the National Women's Monument Commission. To transport interested parties to the Monument grounds, special tram services had to be arranged with the city council. Even the annual Voortrekker Congress adjourned early to allow members to attend the opening.

At 17:00 proceedings began with a prayer by Rev. J.D. Kestell. General J.B.M. Hertzog then addressed the gathering. He warmly thanked the Monument Commission for their hard work and declared:

Who would ever have thought that, after 29 years, the people would be so far recovered from the war that we can now look at one another with confidence … Today the National Women’s Monument stands as a reminder of times past, and today we open a building to refresh the memory of 1902 for the future.

He also referred to General De Wet and President Steyn as the “great men” in Afrikaner history, adding:

If this museum is primarily of significance to the Afrikaans-speaking South African, it is no expression of enmity or ill will. It is, like that monument, a help in preserving our past and all that it means—an inducement to strive for the cause we believe is right.

Following these words, the War Museum was officially opened when Mrs Isabel van Rensburg, wife of Mr Ben van Rensburg, unlocked the Museum. The ceremony concluded with the singing of the song Afrikaner Landgenote.

The Museum came into being during difficult financial times, as the drought of 1933 and the world depression compelled Mr Van Rensburg, on behalf of the Women's Monument Commission, to appeal to the government for state support. For better preservation, it was decided that the large library and documentation already collected should be transferred to the Free State Archives, where it was catalogued as the War Museum Collection. Although a one-off grant of £600 was awarded to the Museum, the Union Government required that ownership of the Museum be transferred to it to provide permanent subsidy. Minister J.H. Hofmeyr further stipulated that the War Museum should fall under a Board of Trustees of the National Museum, a process completed in November 1934 when the museum building and a small portion of the Monument grounds were transferred to the Union Government. A sub-committee, known as the War Museum Committee, consisting of two members of the National Museum and three members of the Women's Monument Commission, was then formed for the War Museum. Mr Ben van Rensburg was appointed as the first director of the Museum. In 1942, plans were drawn up for the construction of a residence for Mr Van Rensburg next to the Museum.

In 1950, plans were submitted by the Department of Public Works for the renovation and enlargement of the Museum, including the conversion of Soff's building into a two-storey structure. The new design by architect J.T. du Toit provided for a solid concrete roof that was more fire-resistant, improved sanitary facilities, and natural light admitted through smaller windows. The caretaker's residence was moved to the first floor. Like Soff, Du Toit kept the Monument in mind in his design, incorporating not only strong classical Egyptian elements (an Egyptian temple style) in connection with the obelisk, but also features reminiscent of President Kruger's residence at Boekenhoutfontein near Rustenburg. The final plans were approved on 30 October 1953, but construction began much later, with the new museum building only opening on 10 October 1957 during the M.T. Steyn Commemoration Festival.

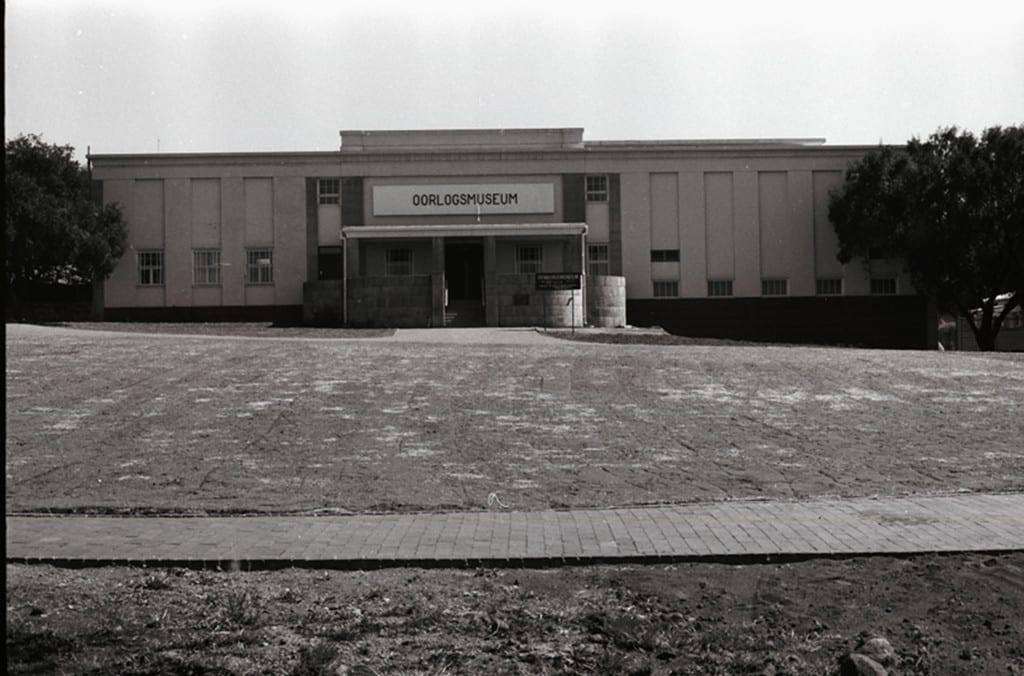
Museum building in 1957

Since 1957, the Museum has received numerous new donations, so much so that in 1960 a request was again made for further expansion, as the exhibition space of 524 square metres was no longer sufficient at that time. For example, the Haveman firearm collection was donated to the Museum that year by the town council of Villiers, but due to lack of space it had to be kept in storage. Only in 1971 was this request met, when a new wing—the present Botha and Kruger Halls on the western side of the main building—was opened on 16 June 1972.

In 1978, the need for adequate office accommodation was addressed when the foundation stone of the current administrative wing and auditorium, on the eastern side of the Museum complex, was laid by Advocate C.R. Swart and brought into use later that same year. At the same time, landscaping of the grounds was undertaken, transforming the surroundings into a park of trees and lawns. In 1980, the Museum's basement was converted into an exhibition hall (the De Wet Hall) to display the tableaux from the Netherlands. This hall was opened on 18 April 1980 by State President P.W. Botha and his wife, Mrs Elize Botha. The last expansions followed in 1986, when a large steel structure for vehicles was erected on the grounds. This structure was later converted into a function hall and today serves as a restaurant.

2009–present:

During April 2009, Tokkie Pretorius succeeded Frik Jacobs as director of the War Museum of the Boer Republics. New objectives were formulated to join the national strategic priorities of social cohesion, reconciliation, national healing and nation building.

British Garrison Hospital

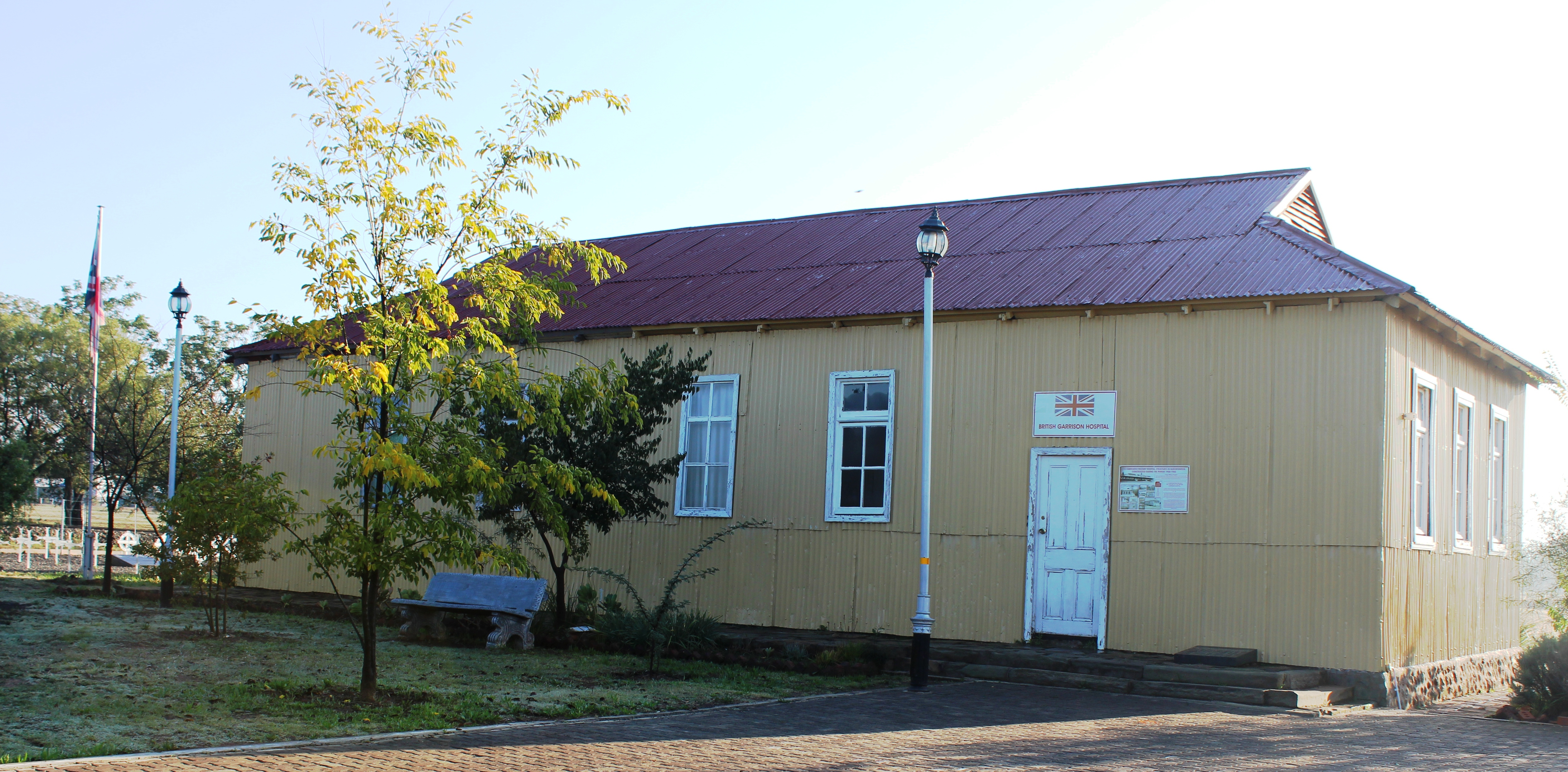
The British garrison hospital.

In June 2009, the museum learned of a British garrison hospital from the era of the Anglo-Boer War period that was built on the grounds of what is presently the Motheo Further Education and Training (FET) College (previously known as the Bloemfontein College of Education – also known as the BOK) in Church Street, Bloemfontein. After the war, this building was used by Emily Hobhouse as a weaving school. Following negotiations with the Motheo FET, the building was transferred to the museum. It was then thoroughly documented, after which the dismantling and relocation began. Some archaeological pieces that could be associated with the history of the building, were found beneath the wooden floors of the structure. The British Garrison Hospital was unveiled at the museum in February 2010.

Agterryer Statue

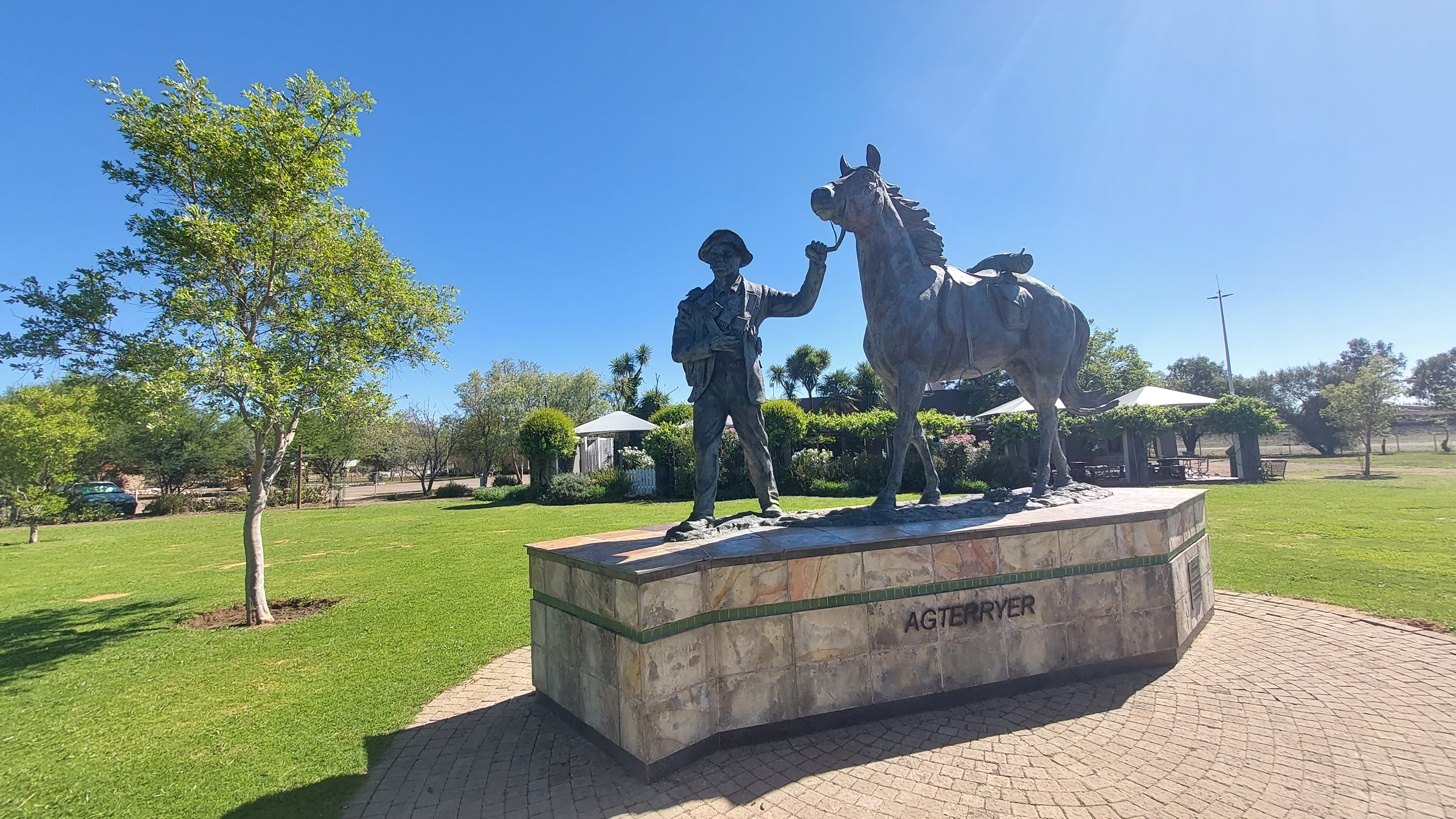
The Agterryer statue.

In order to appropriately pay tribute to the Agterryers for their contribution during the war, the museum had been in contact with the SA Lotteries Distribution Fund since 2010 for financing such a statue as part of the museum's transformation process. A maquette by the sculptor, Phil Minnaar, was accepted, and the creation of the Agterryer was underway. The statue was unveiled in 2013. Agterryers were primarily Black and Coloured men who served as essential attendants, grooms, and assistants to Boer fighters during the Anglo-Boer War (1899–1902). About 100 000–120,000 served on both the Boer and British side performing tasks such as cooking, horse care, spying and combat support.

== Sol Plaatje Hall and Garden of Remembrance ==
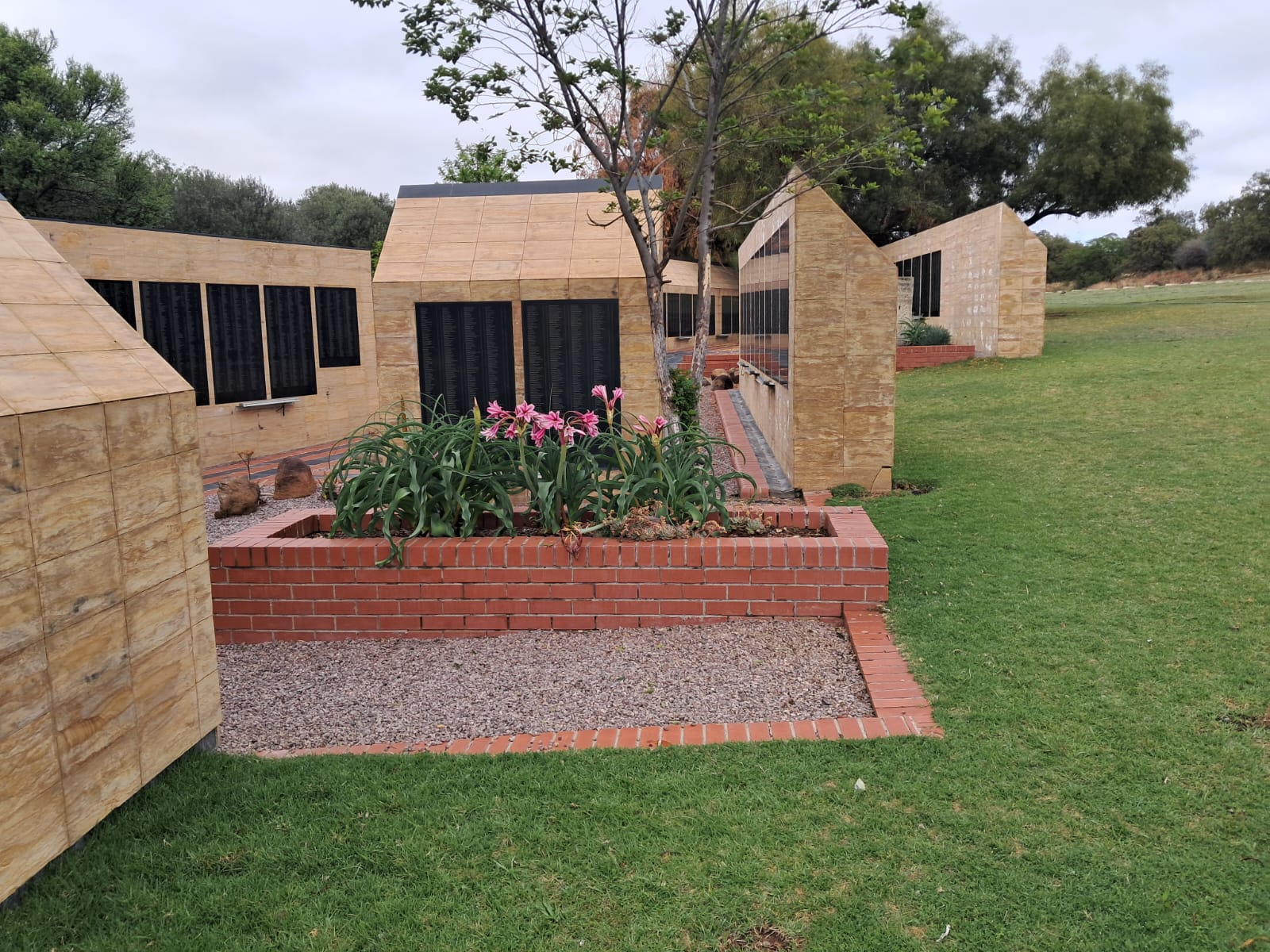
Wall of Remembrance on the museum terrain.

In response to the museum's active steps towards transformation and the expansion on the history relating to the war, the Department of Arts and Culture granted funds for two heritage projects at the museum. The first of these was the Garden of Remembrance, showing the names of black and white victims who died in British concentration camps.

=== Garden of Remembrance ===
In recognition of the thousands of women and children who perished in British concentration camps and even on the battlefield, the museum, with funding from the Department of Arts and Culture, erected a suitable monument in the form of a Garden of Remembrance. The wall contains the names of more than 36 000 black and white women and children who died during the war. The sheer size of the wall gives visitors an idea of the impact of the war on the civilian population. Passages quoted from the speeches of President MT Steyn and Emily Hobhouse at the unveiling of the National Women's Memorial in 1913, are engraved on the wall.

=== Sol Plaatje Hall ===
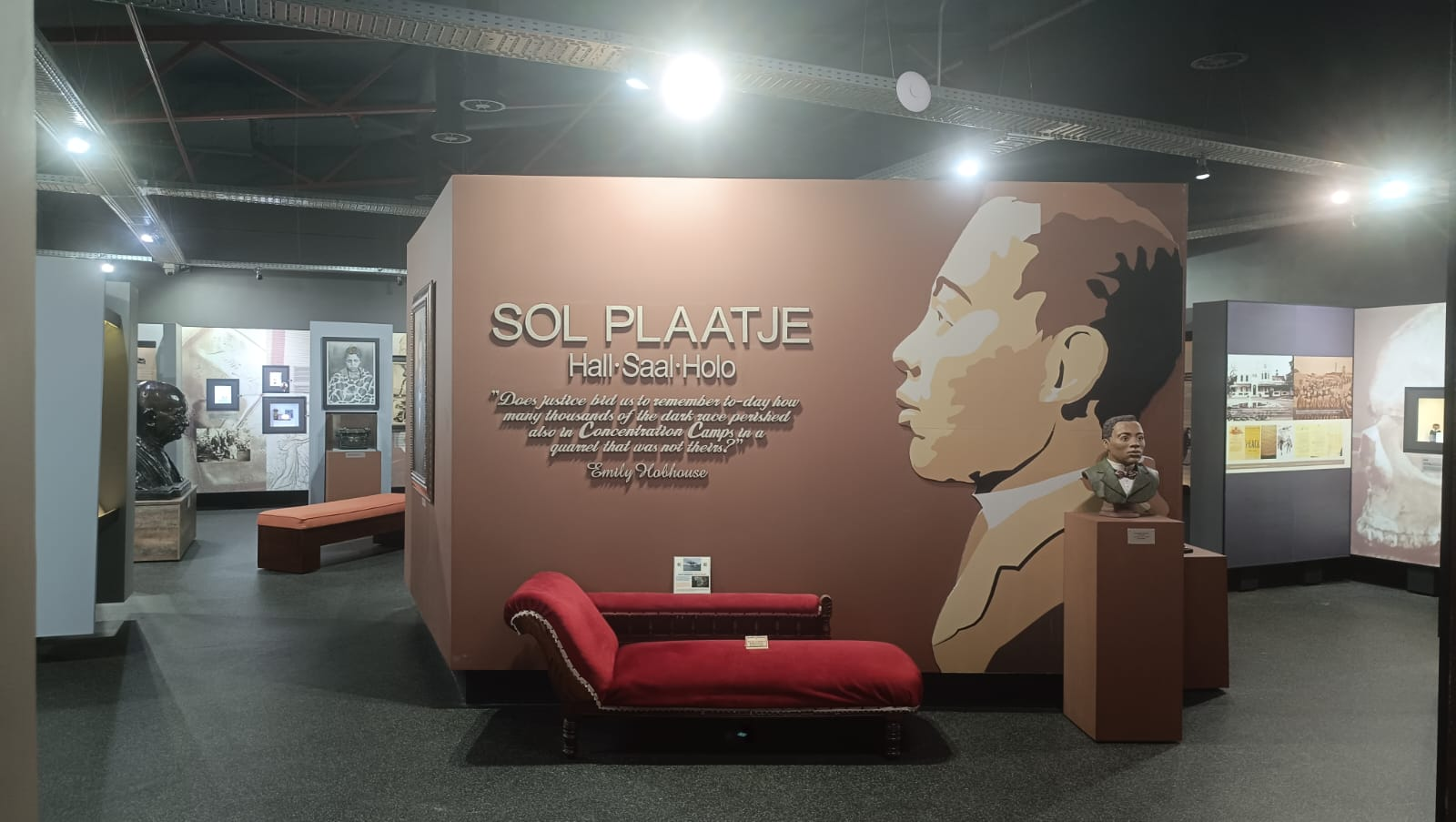
Solomon Tshekiso Plaatje Hall opened in 2015.

New Sol Plaatje Hall In order to obtain a more comprehensive picture of all those who were involved in the Anglo-Boer War, the Department of Arts and Culture granted funding for the erection of a more modern Sol Plaatje Hall, in which the involvement of black South Africans could be pictured in more detail than was previously the case. The development also included a larger storage space for the Museum's art and firearms collections. By means of photographs, artwork and unique items, the new hall provides a chronological overview of the involvement of black South Africans in the war.

Paardeberg Museum

In 1989, the War Museum opened a satellite museum at the Paardeberg railway station, close to the Paardeberg battlefield. The museum was housed in a British corrugated iron barrack structure, which came from the Tempe military basis. With the closure of the Paardeberg station and the subsequent vandalising of the Transnet property, the museum withdrew all its collections at Paardeberg in 2016. The vandalising of the barrack structure continued and, in 2018, thanks to a sponsor, the museum began to move the entire structure to the current terrain in Bloemfontein, where it was re-erected and completed in September 2019. Meanwhile, research and planning for new exhibitions took place, and the Paardeberg Museum opened its doors as part of the programme of an international conference in October 2019 in commemoration of the 120th anniversary of the Anglo-Boer War. The Paardeberg museum exhibits artifacts and objects relating to the Battle of Paardeberg in 1900.

Rundle House

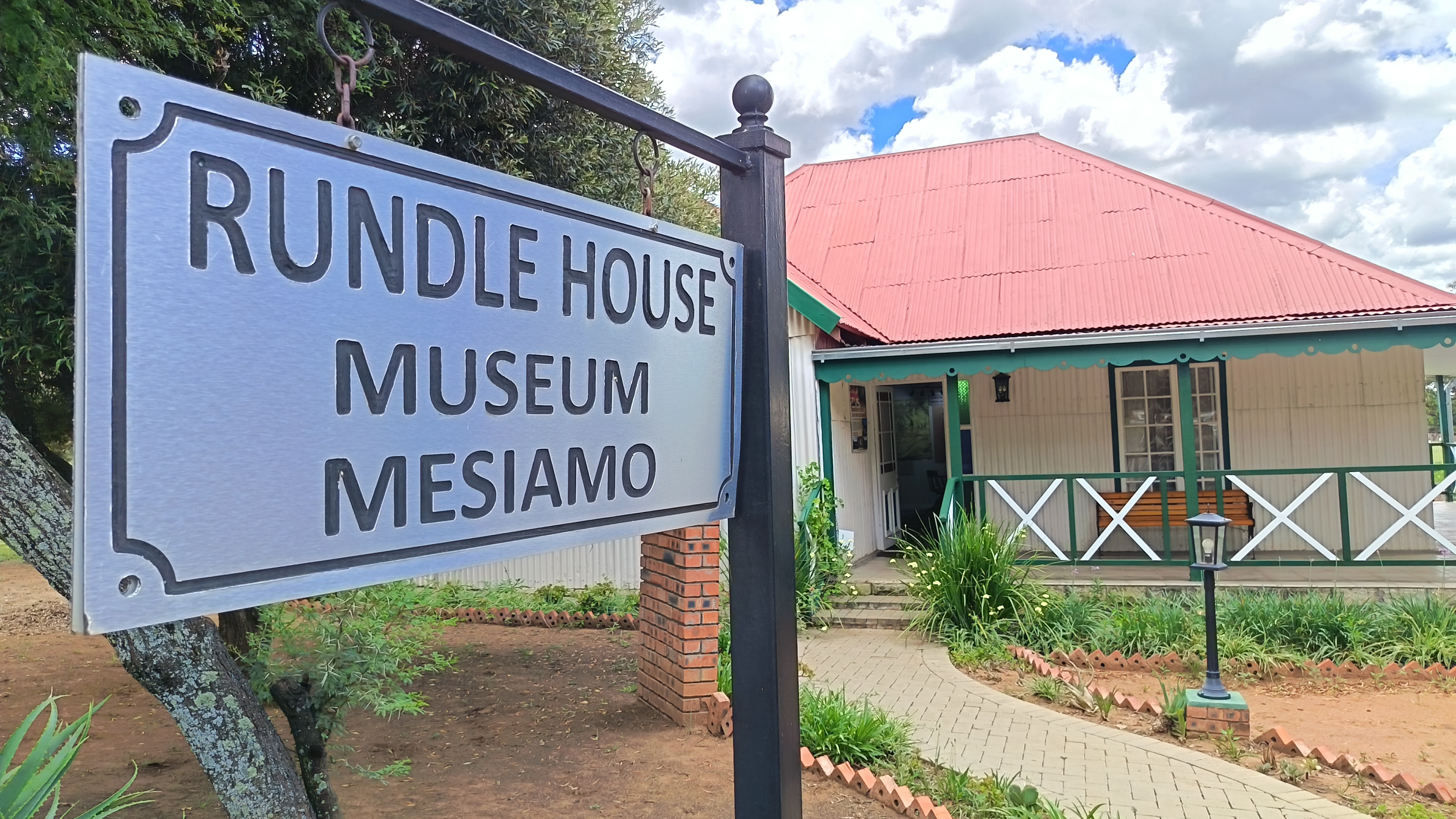
Rundle House Museum on the grounds of the Anglo Boer War Museum.

During the COVID-19 lockdown, the museum obtained a heritage structure from Harrismith which housed British officers during the Anglo-Boer War. After all legal requirements had been complied with, the house was properly documented, dismantled and moved to the museum from Harrismith. It is used as a museum with an exhibition room, where British actions during the war in the Eastern Free State and Natal will be depicted through photographs and items from Harrismith during that period, as well as a display of General Leslie Rundle’s sleeping quarters.

Blockhouse Museum

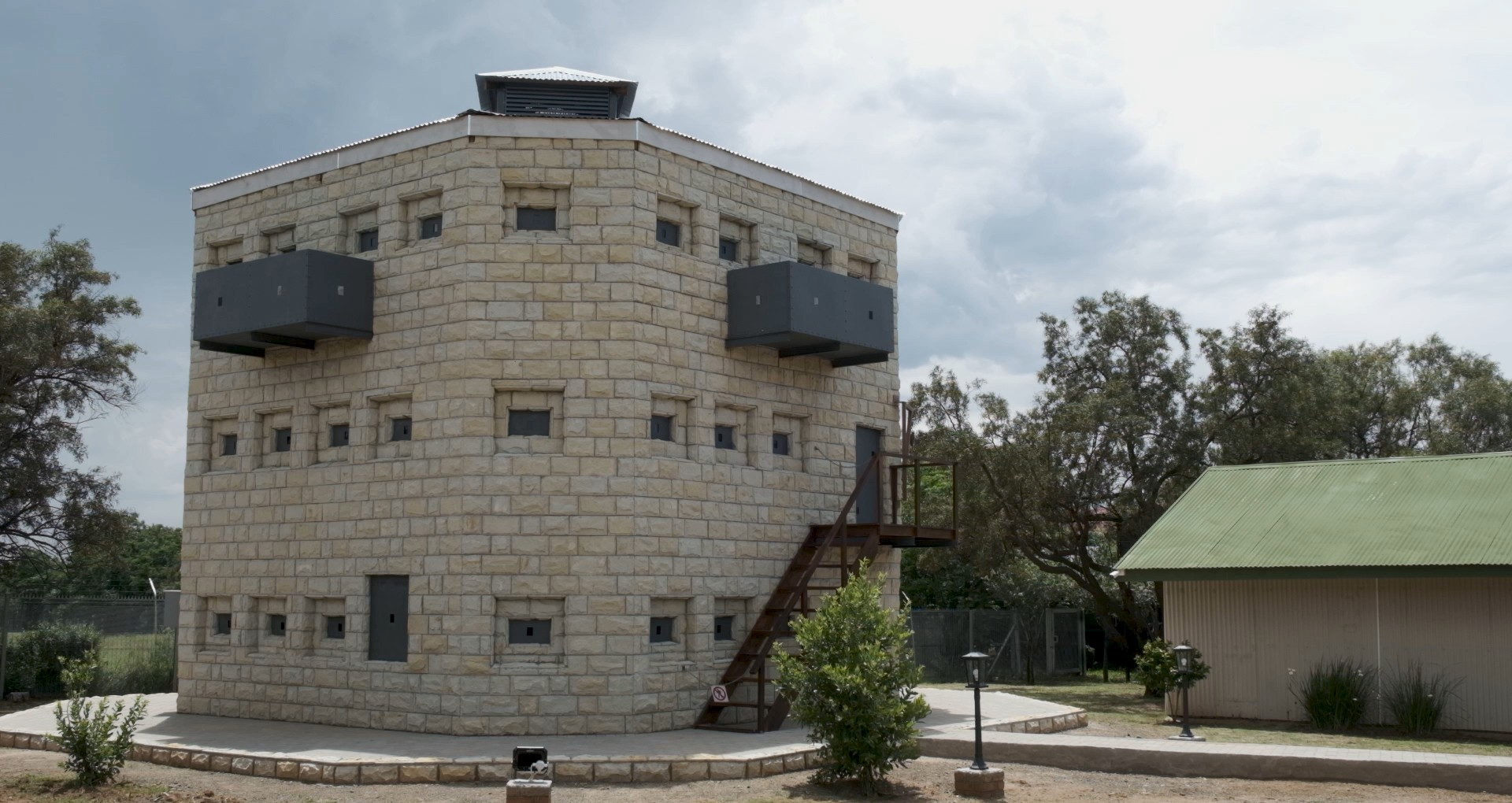
A replica of the British Blockhouse on the grounds of the Anglo-Boer War Museum, unveiled in 2025.

In 2025, the War Museum constructed a replica of a three-story masonry blockhouse, which is an exact replica of one at Riversford in the Bloemfontein area. The replica blockhouse houses an exhibition space which depicts the history of the British blockhouse system used to limit Boer movements and protect strategic points such as railways and bridges during the war.

== Publications by the War Museum ==
- Illustrated History: Black Involvement in the South African War 1899-1902
- Black Concentration Camps – Stowell Kessler
- An ILLUSTRATED HISTORY of BLACK SOUTH AFRICANS in the Anglo-Boer War 1899-1902 - Johan van Zÿl, Rodney Constantine and Tokkie Pretorius Gedenkreeks 1–3
- Die Anglo-Boereoorlog in 100 Objekte / The Anglo-Boer War in 100 Objects – War Museum
- Soldiers of the Queen on the South African veld - War Museum
- New Perspectives on the Anglo-Boer War / Nuwe perspektiewe op die Anglo-Boereoorlog
- Die Oorlogsmuseum van die Boererepublieke 1931-2008 – War Museum
- 2009-2020: The War Museum of the Boer Republics – War Museum
- The Wilted Flower Children's Series, Vol. 1 & 2 in Afrikaans, English and Sesotho
- “WORK OR STARVE: Black concentration camps & forced labour camps in South Africa, 1901–1902. – Dr Benneyworth
- Prisoners of War in the South African War – Available in Afrikaans, Sesotho and English.
- Caught in the Crossfire: Journal on Indian Involvement in the South African War 1899–1902
- Foreign Involvement in the South African War, 1899–1902
- A Tribute to the Agterryers
- The Culture-Historical Heritage of the War Museum
- Reclaiming Unity Once Denied
- Children in the South African War In Afrikaans, Engels and Sesotho. Behind the Scenes available In Afrikaans, English and Sesotho.
- Caught in the Crossfire: Indian Involvement in the South African War, 18922-1902
- Foreign Involvement in the South African War, 1899–1902.

== Gallery ==
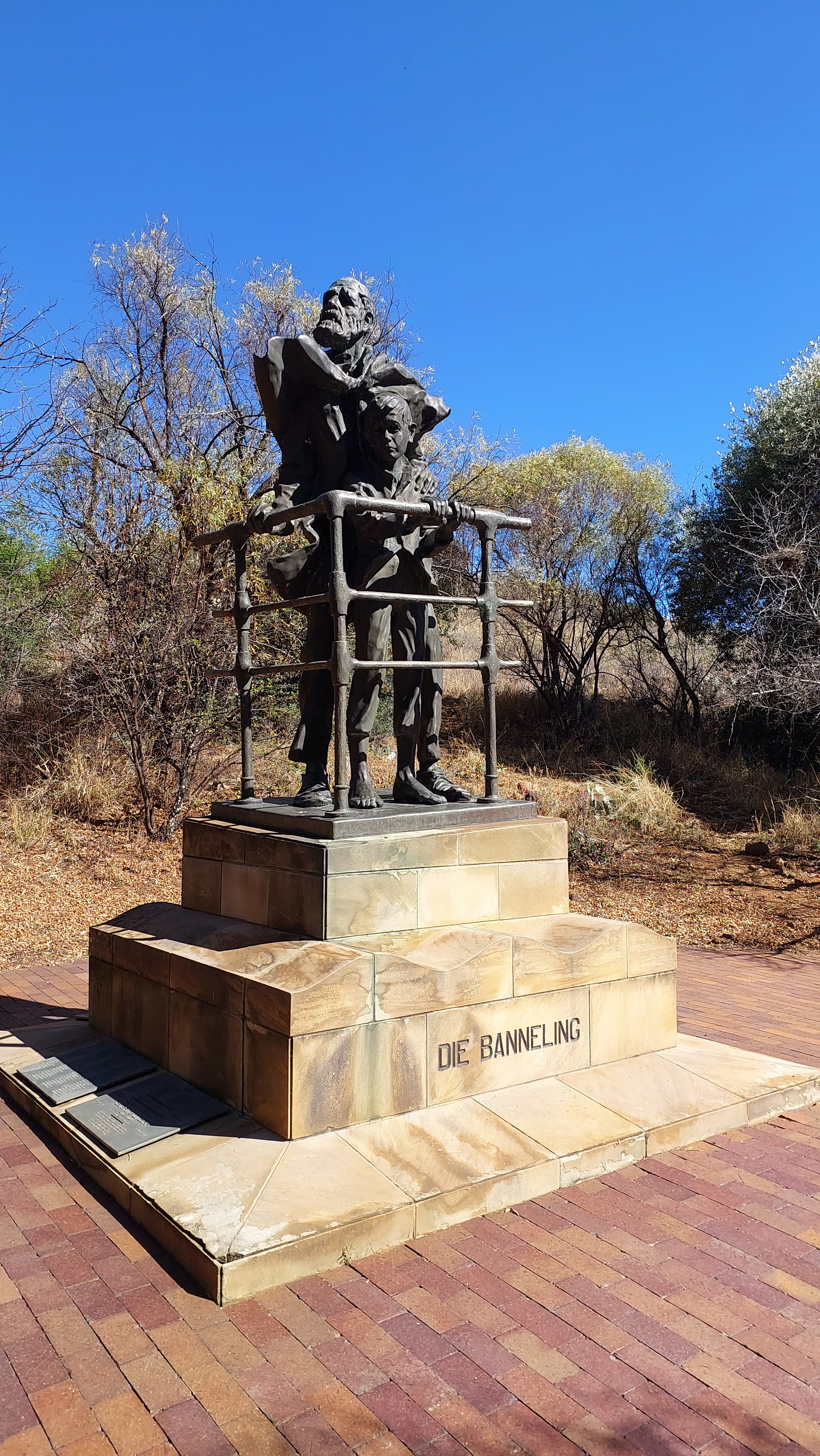
Prisoner of War Monument.

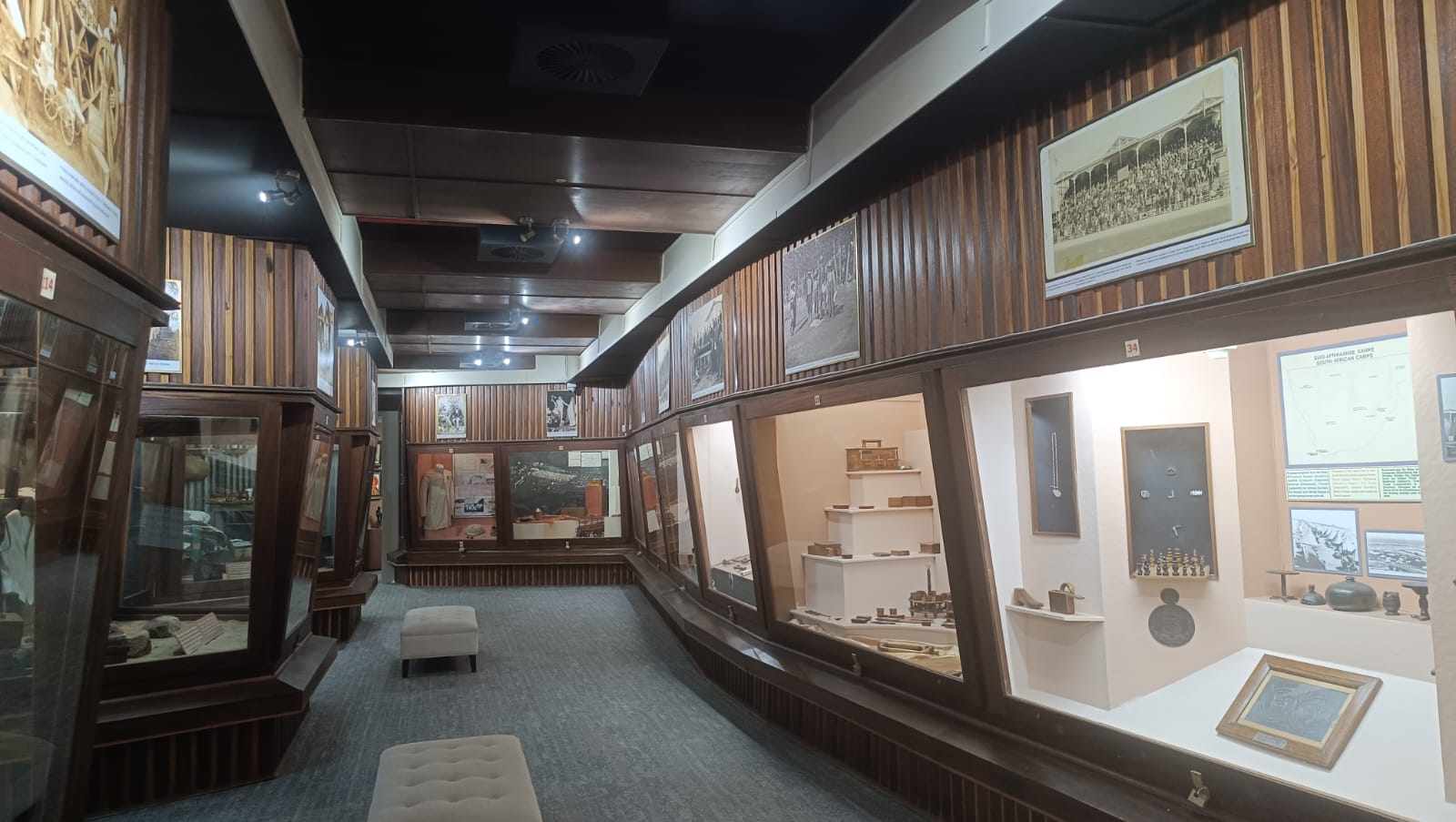
Paul Kruger Hall.

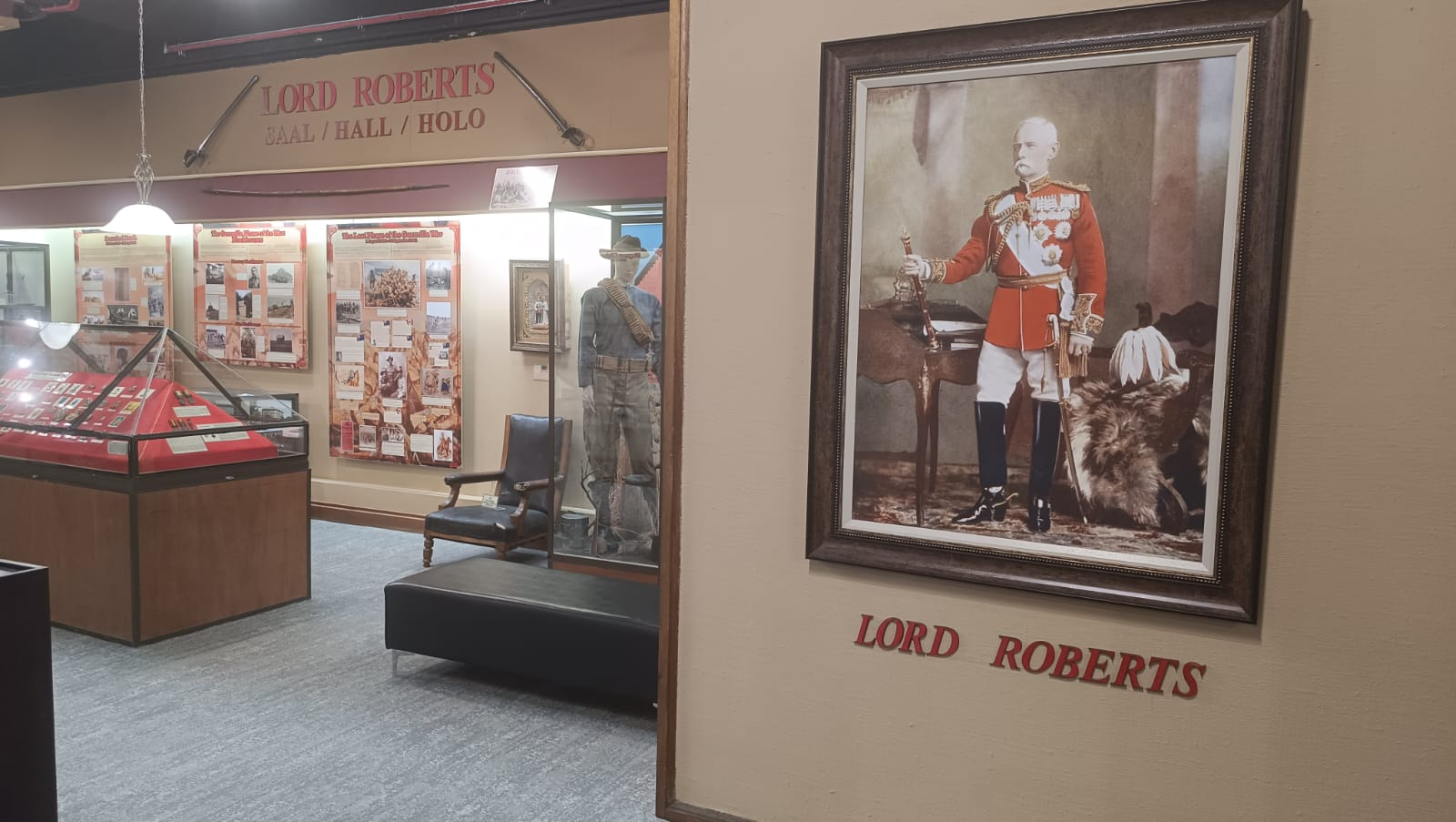
Lord Robert Hall.

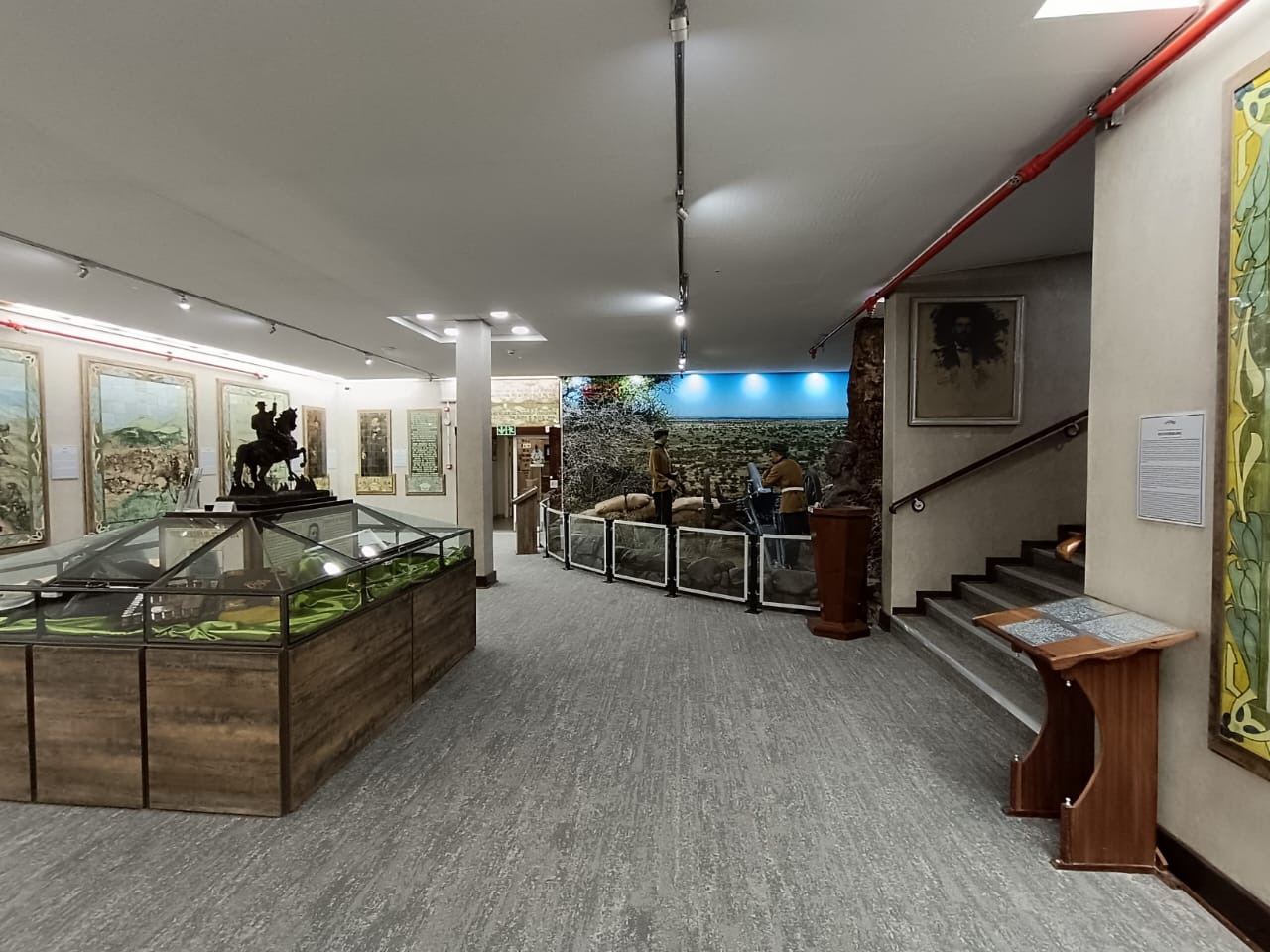
General de Wet Hall.

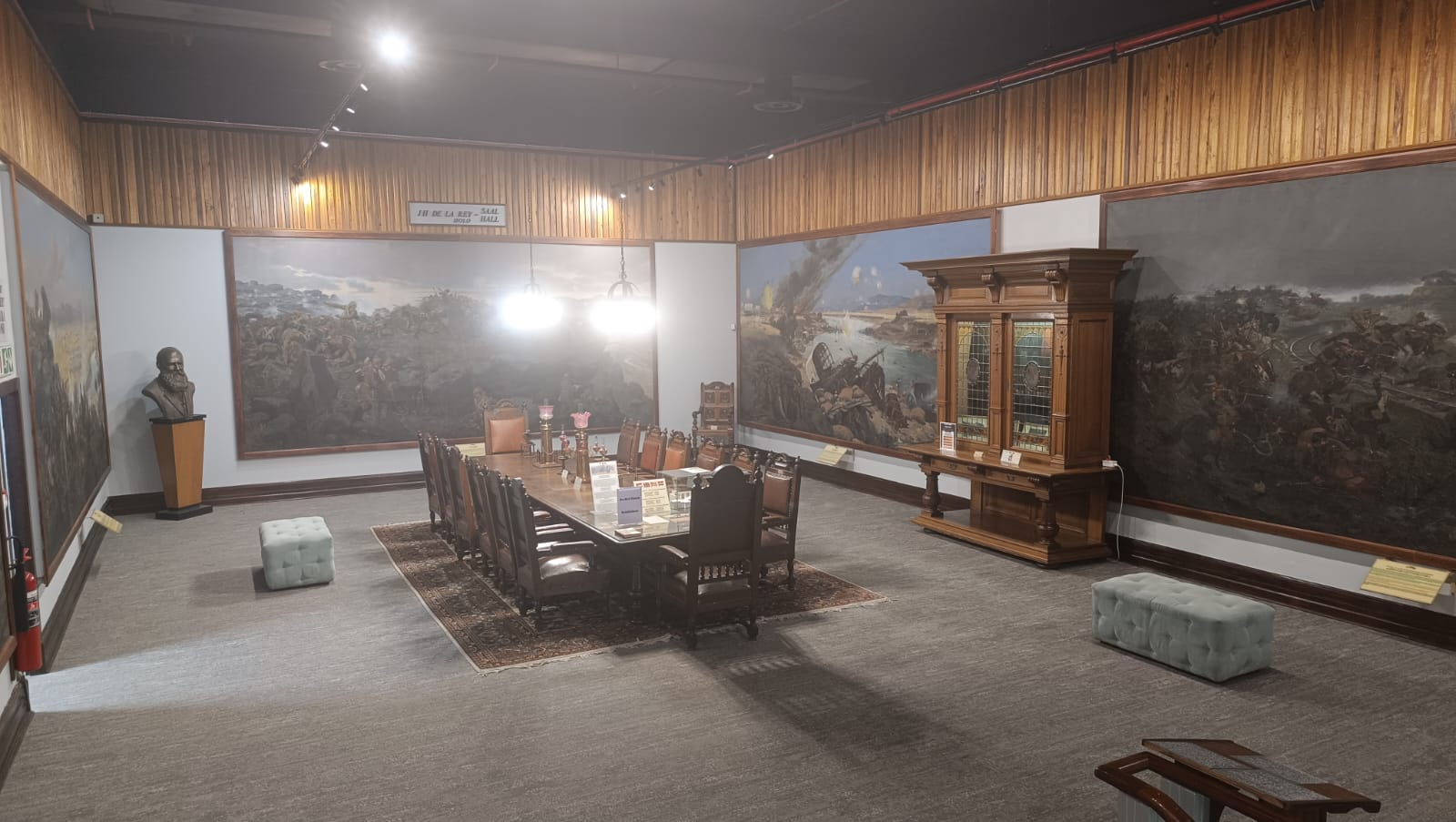
General de la Rey Hall.

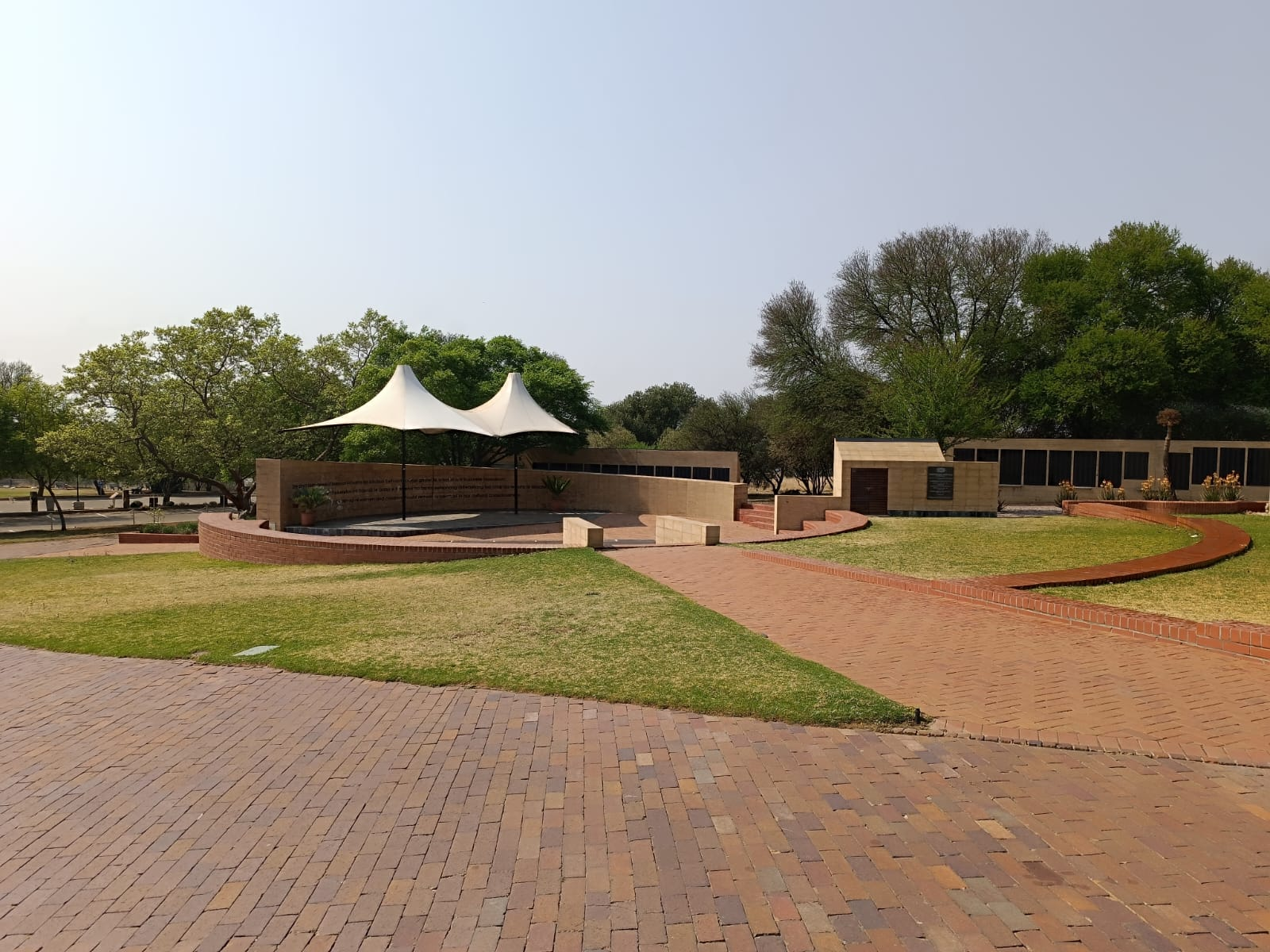
Amphitheatre at the Garden of Remembrance.

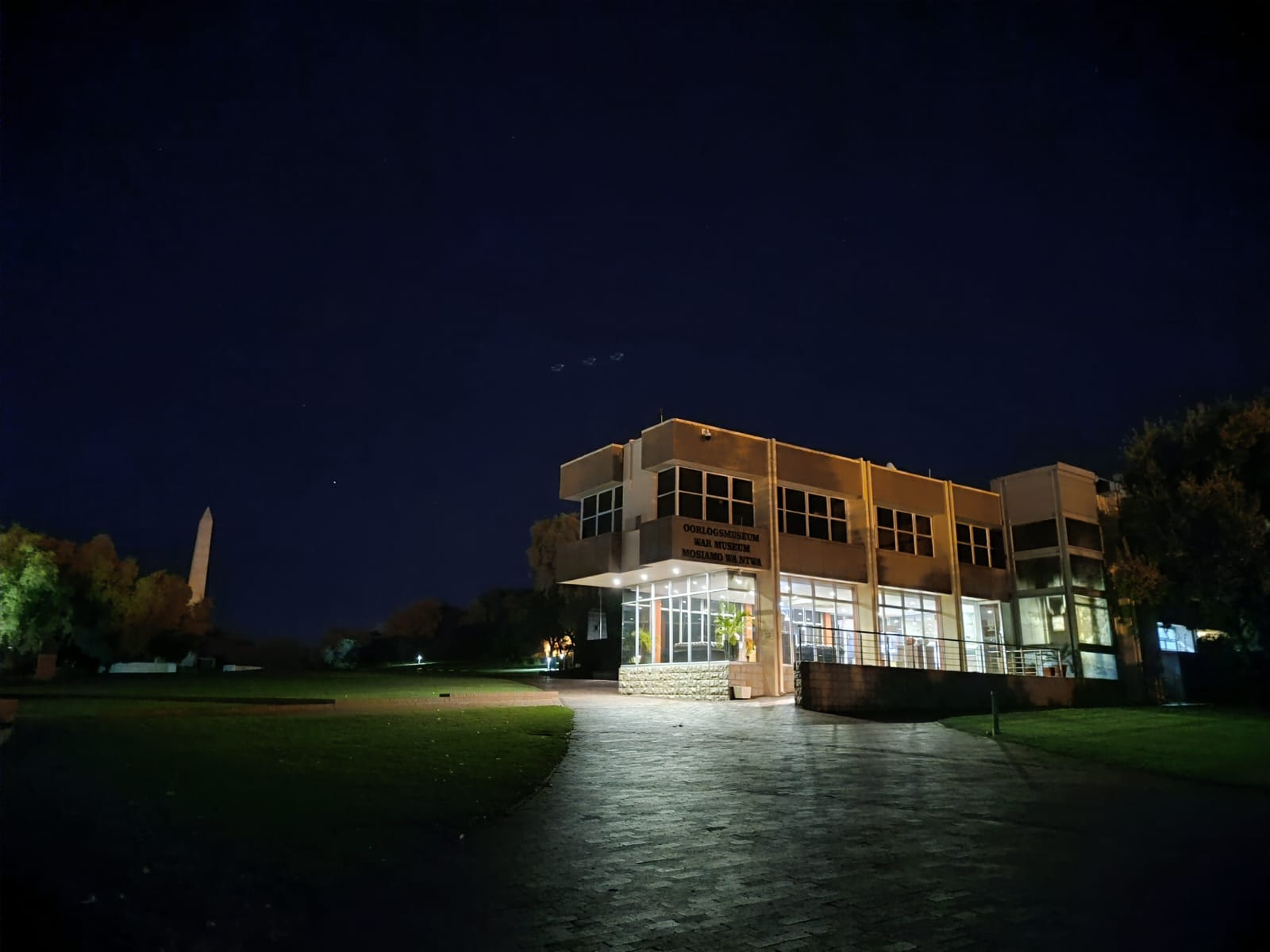
War Museum at night.

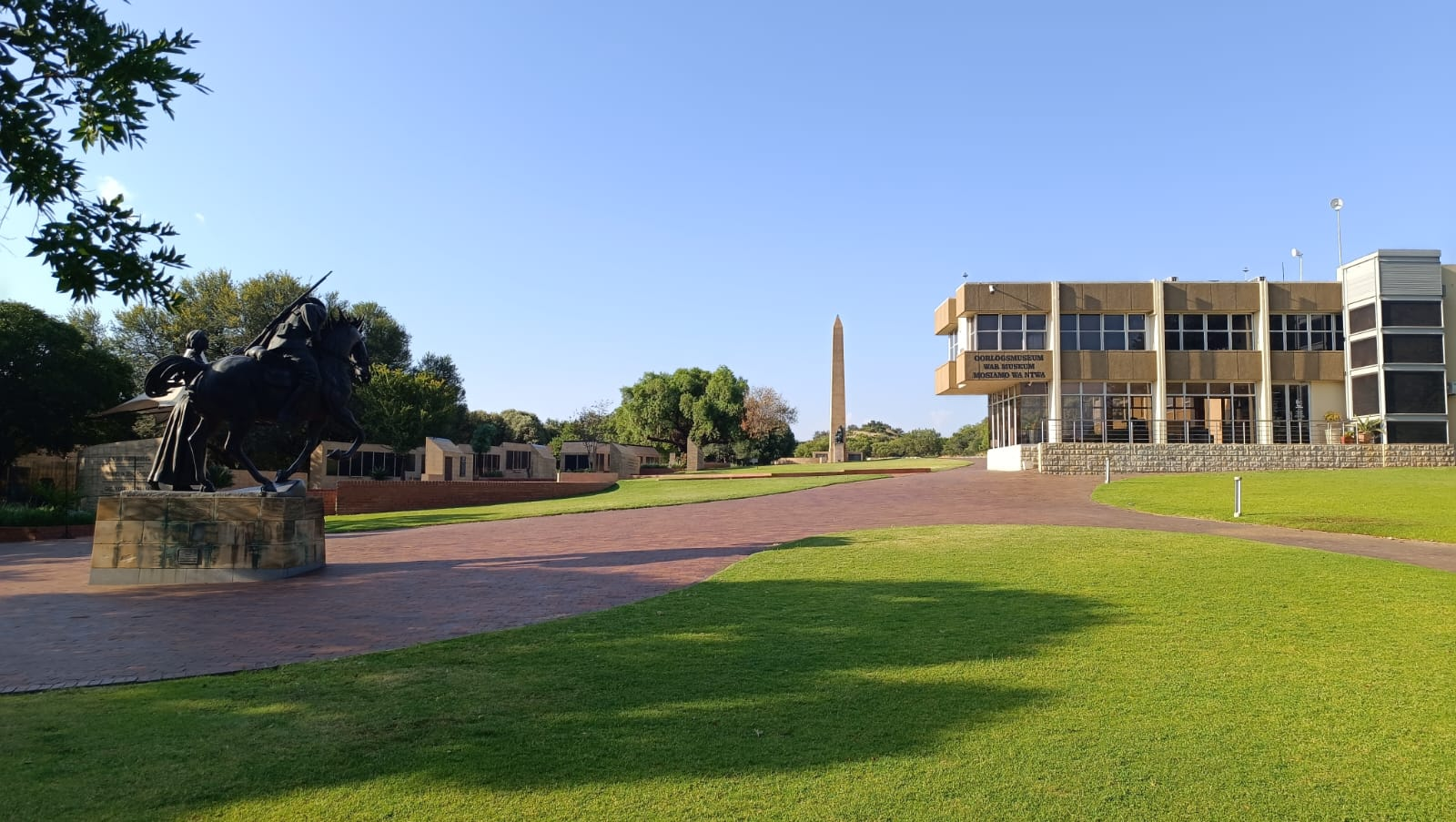
Museum terrain during the day.

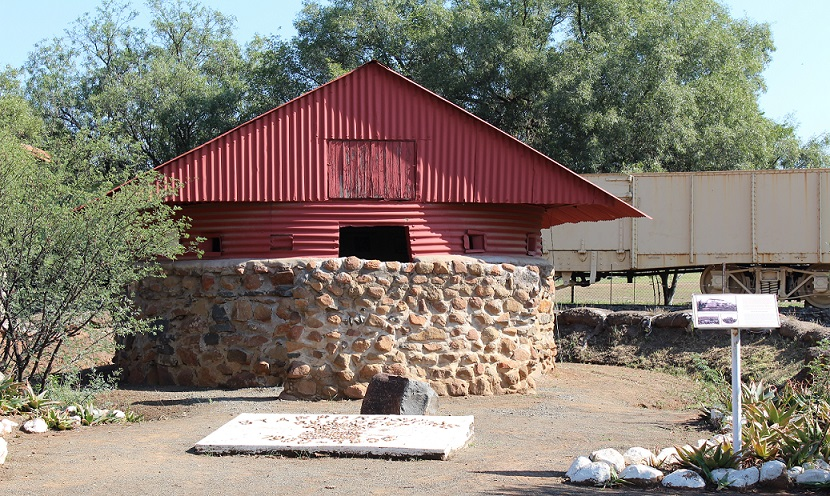
The original Rice Blockhouse at the museum.

== See also ==
- National Women's Monument
- Anglo-Boer War Memorial
