= Stowell Kessler =

Historian

Stowell Van Courtlandt Kessler
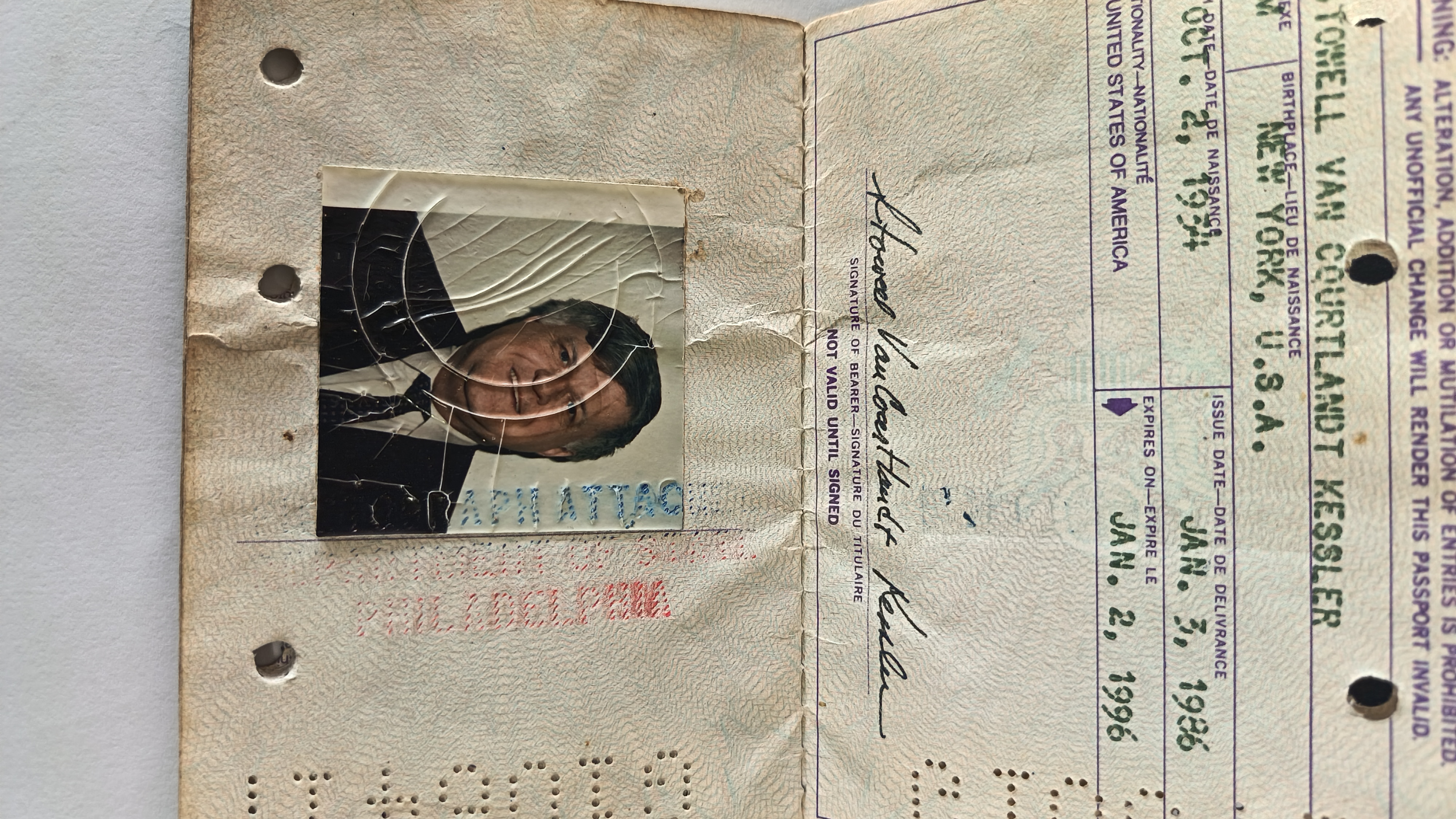
- Stowell Van Courtlandt Kessler United State of American passport
- Born: 2 October 1934
- Died: 2007 (aged 72–73)
- Education: Princeton Theological Seminary; University of Cape Town
- Occupations: Historian, theologian, civil rights activist
- Known for: Research on black concentration camps during the South African War

Stowell Van Courtlandt Kessler (born 1934) was an American historian, theologian and civil rights activist whose research focused on the experiences of Black South Africans during the South African War of 1899–1902. He is known for his research into the concentration camps established for Black people by the British military during the war.

== Early life and military service ==
Kessler was born on 2 October 1934 in the United States and left school at an early age to support his parents. He later served as a United States military conscript during the Korean War. He arrived in the Korean war zone in 1952 and remained there after the end of the fighting, working on mine-clearance operations until September 1953. During his military service he completed his high school diploma. Following his military service, Kessler became involved in theology and the American civil rights movement. He was active in civil rights work in Mississippi before turning increasingly to academic and historical research.

== Education and theological work ==
Kessler studied theology at Princeton Theological Seminary. His theological work developed an interest in South African history, politics, and religion. His early academic work was research into Afrikaner religious and political thought. His master's research examined the theological roots of apartheid and the relationship between Afrikaner suffering, religious identity and civil religion and was called ‘The suffering of the Afrikaners and their civil religion: The theological roots of apartheid’. Kessler subsequently developed an interest in the history of the South African War, also known as the Anglo-Boer War, which took place between 1899-1902, and traveled to South Africa, where he began extensive research into historical sources concerning the experiences of Black South Africans during the conflict.

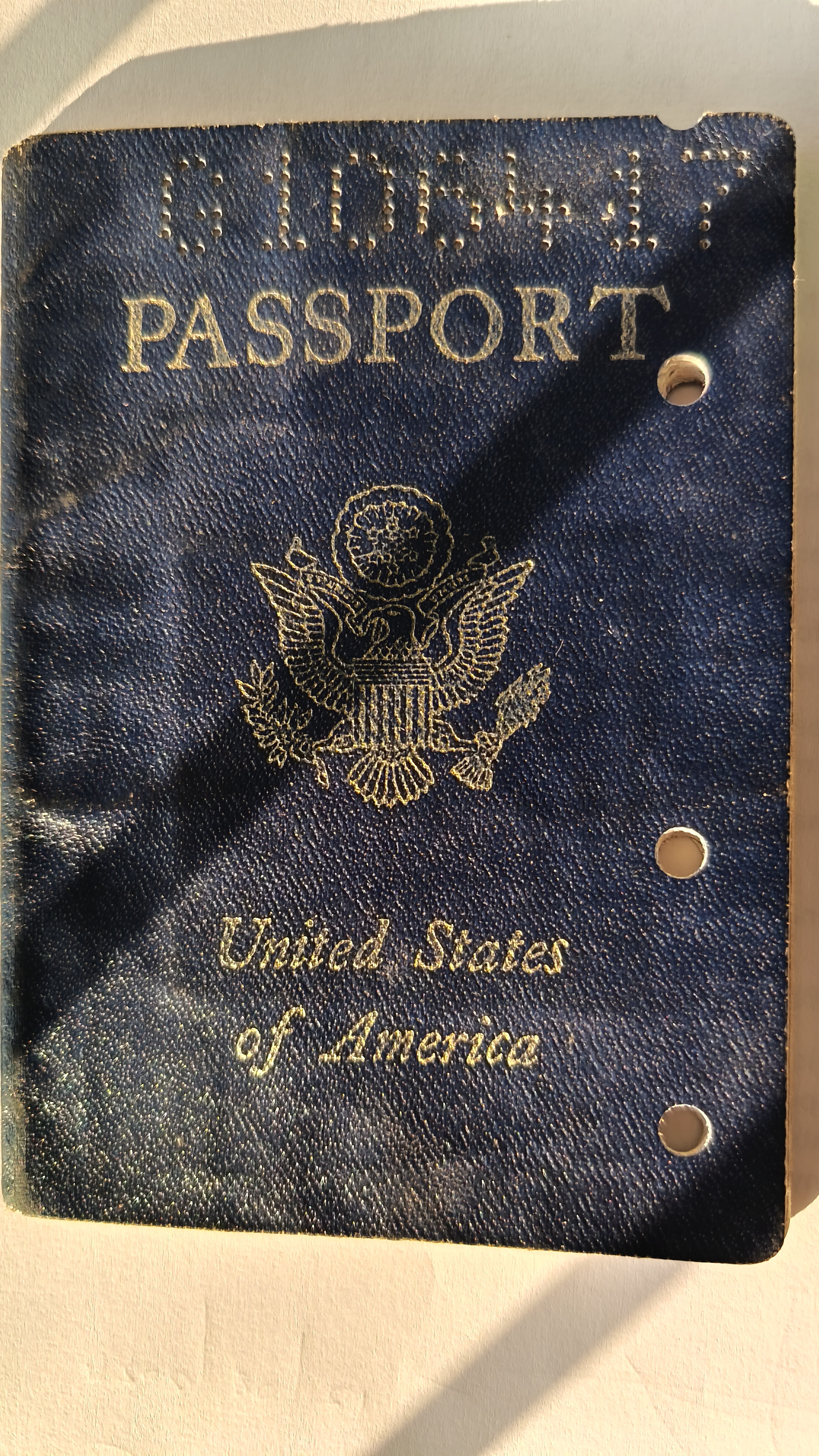
Stowell Van Courtlandt Kessler United State of American passport

== Research on the South African War 1899-1902 and Doctoral research ==
Kessler's historical research was the experience of Black and Coloured people during the South African War. His work challenged the limited attention traditionally given to Black victims of the British concentration-camp system. In 1999, Kessler published an article in Historia titled "The Black and Coloured Concentration Camps of the Anglo-Boer War 1899–1902: Shifting the Paradigm from Sole Martyrdom to Mutual Suffering". The article examined the historiography of the war and the treatment of Black and colored people in concentration camps. He later completed his PhD in historical studies at the University of Cape Town and his doctoral thesis was titled The Black Concentration Camps of the South African War, 1899–1902. In an interview published by the University of Cape Town at the time of his graduation, Kessler estimated that as many as 25,000 Black people died in the camps. Kessler's research was subsequently cited by other historians studying the South African War. Later scholarship has credited his work with producing new and more accurate estimates of deaths in the Black concentration camps.

== The Black concentration camps ==
Kessler's research focused particularly on the historical treatment of Black people who were displaced and interned during the South African War. He argued that the Black concentration camps had been inadequately represented in earlier historical accounts of the war. The University of Cape Town's research resources identify Kessler's work as a major contribution to the study of the camps. Later historians have also cited his research when examining the forcible removal of Black communities and the British military purposes behind the concentration-camp system.

== Publication of his major work ==
The Black Concentration Camps of the Anglo-Boer War (1899-1902) was published posthumously in 2012 by the Anglo-Boer War Museum in Bloemfontein, where some of his records are kept. The book is 352 pages long and includes maps, illustrations, bibliographical references and an index. The War Museum described the book as the result of a decade and a half of archival research and stated that Kessler had identified at least 26,000 Black deaths in 65 camps. These figures should be understood as findings attributed to Kessler's research rather than as uncontested historical figures.

== Personal life ==
Kessler lived in Mamafubedu, formerly known as Petrus Steyn and was married to Marie Steyn, an Afrikaner woman. He has children in the United States of America from his previous marriage.

== Death ==
Kessler died in 2007.

== Legacy ==
Kessler's research contributed to the expansion of historical scholarship concerning Black experiences during the South African War. His work has subsequently been cited by historians examining Black concentration camps, civilian displacement and the broader social consequences of the war. The Stowell Kessler Library at Elandskop Museum in Mamafubedu, Free State, South Africa, is named in his honor.

== Selected publications ==
- Kessler, Stowell V. (1999). "The Black and Coloured Concentration Camps of the Anglo-Boer War 1899–1902: Shifting the Paradigm from Sole Martyrdom to Mutual Suffering". Historia. 44 (1): 110–147.
- Kessler, Stowell V. (2001). "The Black and Coloured Concentration Camps". Scorched Earth.
- Kessler, Stowell V. (2003). The Black Concentration Camps of the South African War, 1899–1902 (PhD thesis). University of Cape Town. hdl:11427/23306.
- Kessler, Stowell V. (2012). The Black Concentration Camps of the Anglo-Boer War 1899–1902. Bloemfontein: War Museum of the Boer Republics. ISBN 978-1-874979-44-9.
