= National Women's Monument =

Monument in South Africa

Coordinates: 29.1416°S 26.2083°E

Women's Memorial, Monument Road, Bloemfontein
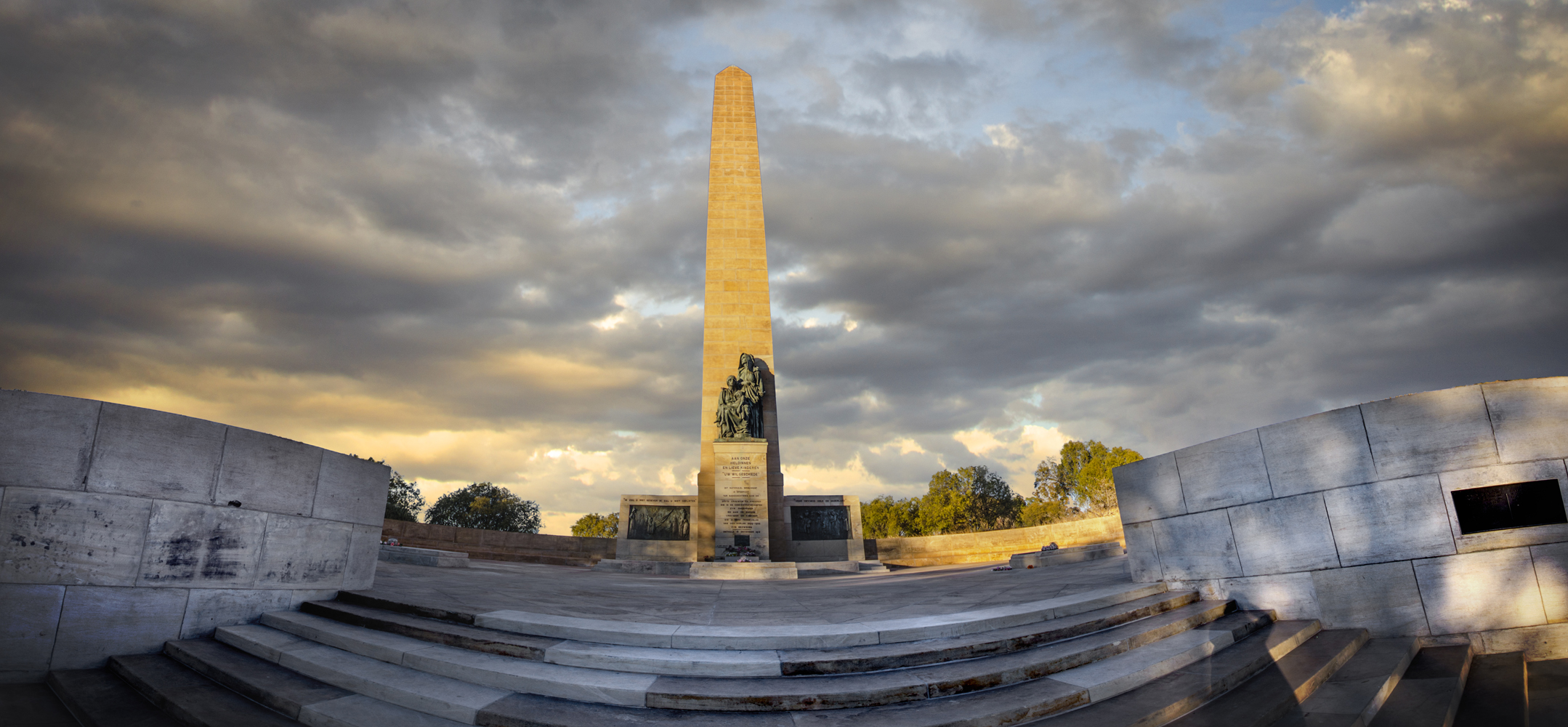
- Interactive map of Women's Memorial, Monument Road, Bloemfontein
- Designer: Frans Soff; Anton van Wouw
- Opening date: 16 December 1913; 112 years ago
- Dedicated to: Boer women and children held in concentration camps during the Second Boer War

The National Women's Monument (Afrikaans: Nasionale Vrouemonument) in Bloemfontein, South Africa, is a monument commemorating the roughly 27,000 Boer women and children who died in British concentration camps during the Second Boer War. The Monument is a Provincial Heritage Site in the Free State.

The monument was designed by a Pretoria architect, Frans Soff, and the sculpting was done by Anton van Wouw. It consists of an obelisk about 35m in height and low, semi-circular walls on two sides. A central bronze group, sketched by English anti-war activist Emily Hobhouse and depicting her own experience of 15 May 1901, is of two sorrowing women and a dying child in the Springfontein camp. The monument was unveiled on 16 December 1913, attended by about 20,000 South Africans. Thirteen years later, Emily Hobhouse's ashes were ensconced at the foot of the monument. Also beside the monument are the graves of Christiaan de Wet, Rev. John Daniel Kestell, President of the Orange Free State Martinus Steyn, and his wife.

== Origins ==
The idea of a monument was expressed by Martinus Steyn, then president of the Orange Free State Republic, whilst receiving medical treatment in Europe after the Boer War. His wife, Rachel Isabella "Tibbie" Steyn, played a part in the concept, having family members and associates who had died in the British concentration camps. She also had close ties with Emily Hobhouse. On his return to South Africa, Steyn set up an action committee to launch the project. The notion of constructing a school or hospital was rejected as lacking inspiration, a view which gained support from a number of Afrikaner organizations.

£10,000 of funding for the monument came from the Afrikaner community over a period of four years from 1907 to 1911. The start of construction was delayed by English-speaking members of the Bloemfontein Town Council, who felt the memorial would reflect poorly on Great Britain and by extension on the locals who had supported the war.

Prime Minister Louis Botha, who had embarked on a mission of reconciliation after the war, also disapproved of the memorial. This also lead to accusations made that the monument was built, broken down and rebuilt.

== Location ==
The monument is around 3 km south of central Bloemfontein. Against the backdrop of the surrounding hills, the monument blends in well to the local farm community and therefore to the Boer lifestyle memorialized there.

== Description ==
A circular shelter (screen wall) around 35 m high surrounds the central obelisk.

=== Sculpture group ===
The sculpture group includes a woman without her bonnet, with her emaciated, dying child in her lap. A second woman goes to the distance, calling on the Lord to see the tragedy.

The inspiration for the scene was described in a poignant way by Hobhouse, referring to a scene in Springfontein where a woman would not look at her starving child, experiencing a pain beyond all tears. A second message comes from the child's eyes: her child is dead, but her willpower is not dead and her people is not extinct.

Hobhouse (a woman of many talents) did not hold Van Wouw in high regard as a sculptor and spoke critically of the final product. She held that images did not do justice to the pitiful scene portrayed, feeling the child looks asleep rather than at death's door.

=== Significance ===
The Women's Monument enjoyed great popularity, but was eventually overshadowed by the Voortrekker Monument, erected 36 years later in Pretoria on December 16, 1949, as a national symbol. The Voortrekker Monument came a year after the victory of the National Party in the 1948 South African general election and coincided with the centennial of the Great Trek. In contrast, the controversy surrounding the Women's Monument delayed its recognition on a national scale.

== School use of the monument ==
The students of C&N Sekondêre Meisieskool Oranje ("C&N Girls' Secondary School Orange") in Bloemfontein visit the school annually in memory of president Steyn and its historical significance. The visit is a 10-km hike from the school to the monument. Wreaths are laid by Steyn's grave, and several ceremonies are held as students pledge to develop the potential of their Afrikaner, Christian heritage.

== Later embellishments ==
The aesthetic scope of the monument widened over time. Initially, no men were depicted, but with the burial of Steyn at the foot of the structure, a new era of commemorations began, eventually bringing a war memorial into the area. Tibbie Steyn expressed concern that the use of the grounds of the monument for burials of war veterans would dilute the original focus on the suffering of women and children. Despite her protestations, she was buried in 1955 alongside her husband by Dr. D. F. Malan, a year after having retired as Prime Minister of South Africa. Malan declared her the last link to the original Boer Republics. Since 1960, other memorials of the Second Boer War have been erected on the Women's Monument grounds, making the monument one of the primary sites dedicated to the war's legacy. Cultural institutions used surrounding plots of land to commemorate civilians, volunteers, POWs, and Bittereinders. While complementary to the Women's Monument, they confirmed the shift in emphasis.

== Nearby institutions ==
The Anglo-Boer War Museum is permanently located on the same premises.

== Graves by the monument ==
- Mathinus Theunis Steyn, 1916
- Emily Hobhouse, 1926
- Christiaan De Wet, 1922
- JD (Vader) Kestell, 1941
- Rachel Isabella Steyn, 1955

== Gallery ==
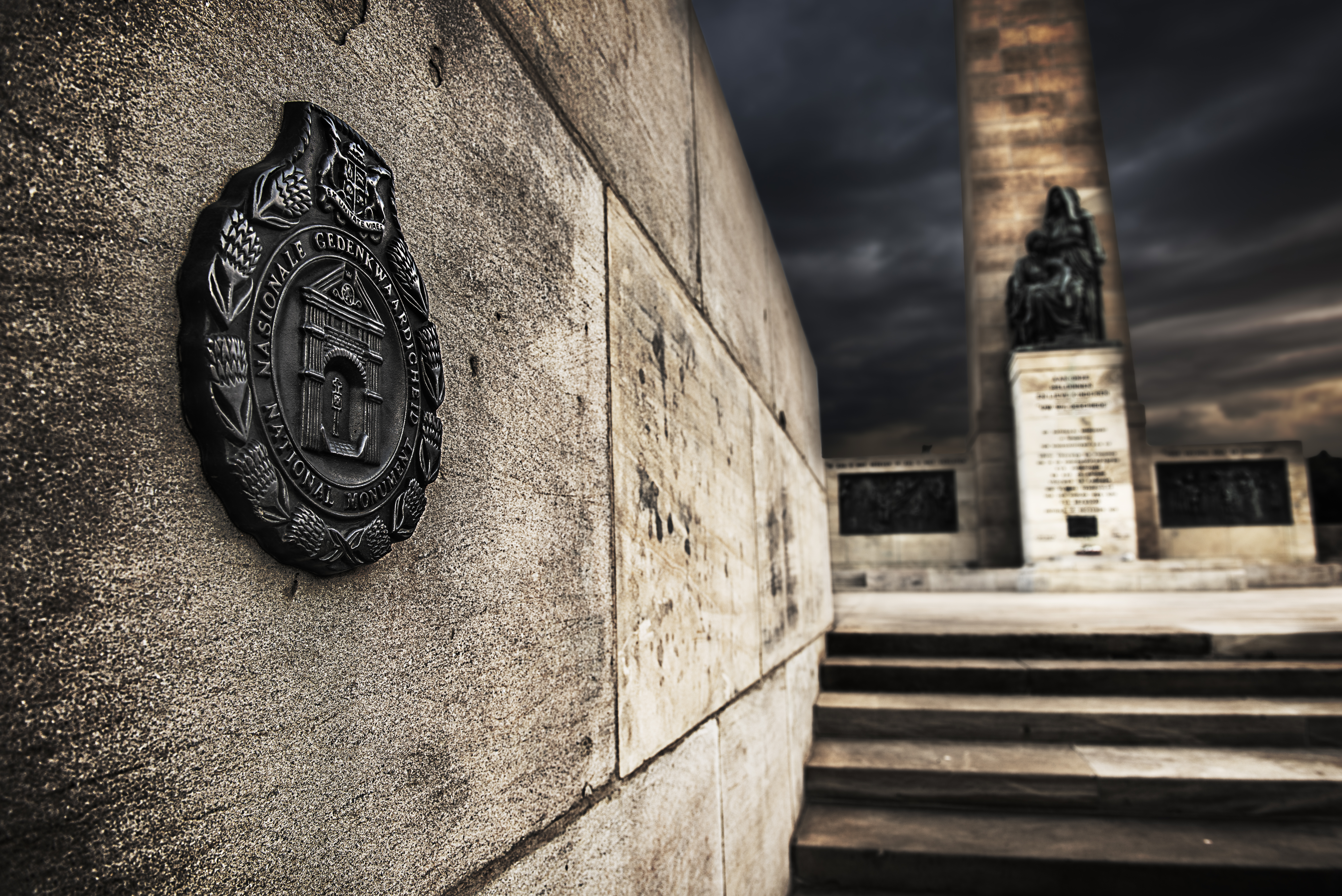
Plaque on the side wall

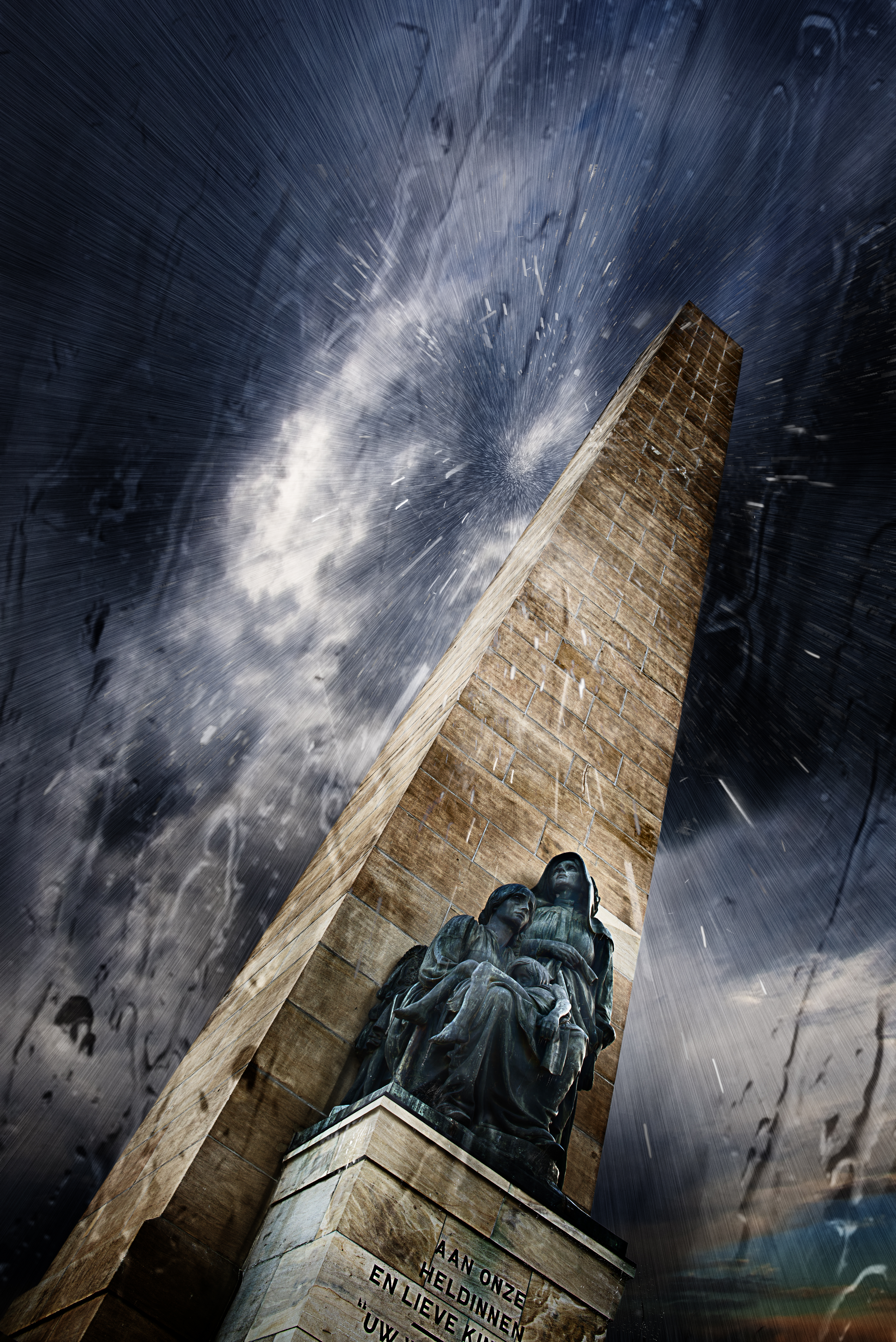
The main obelisk

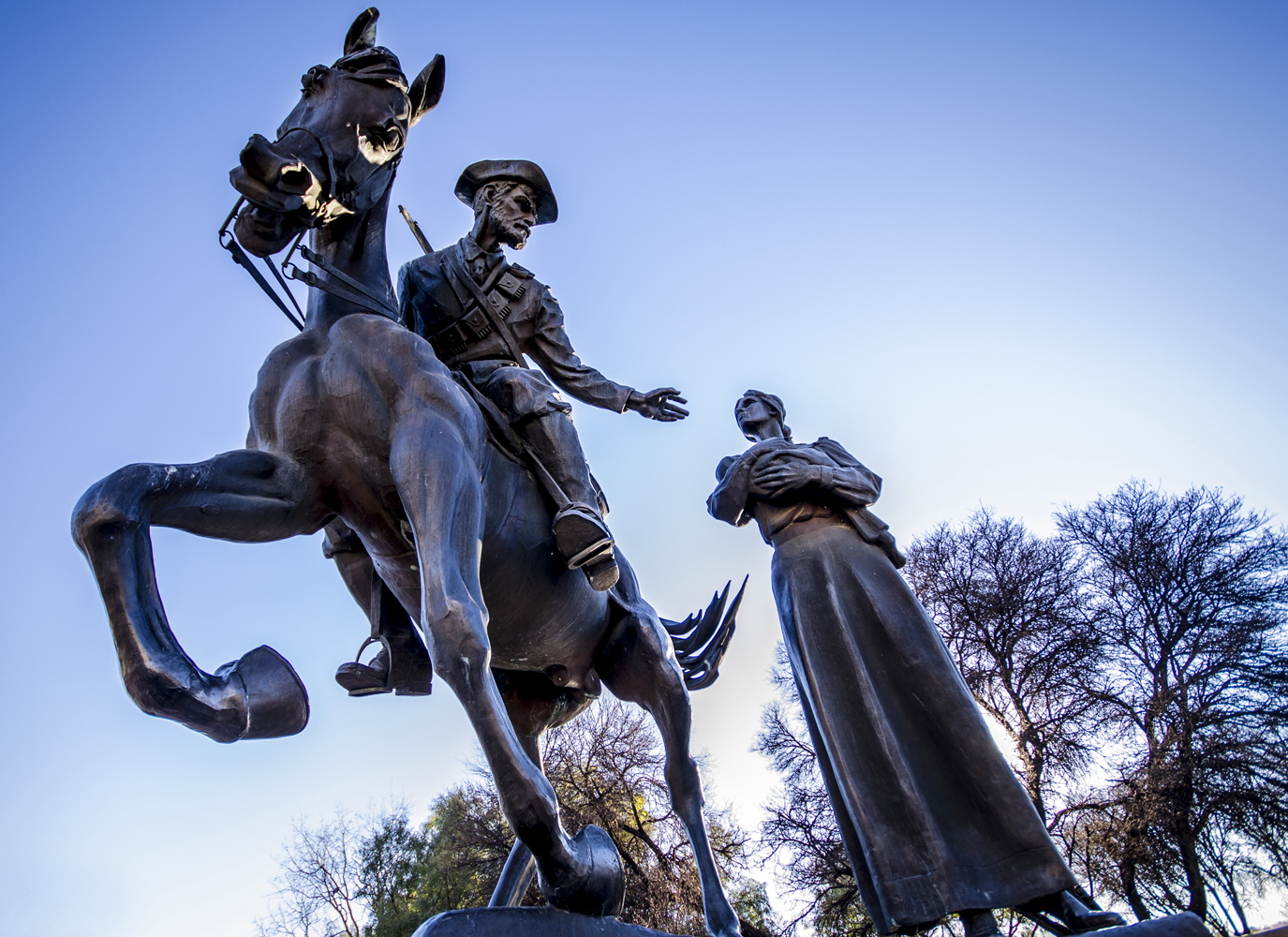
One of the statues

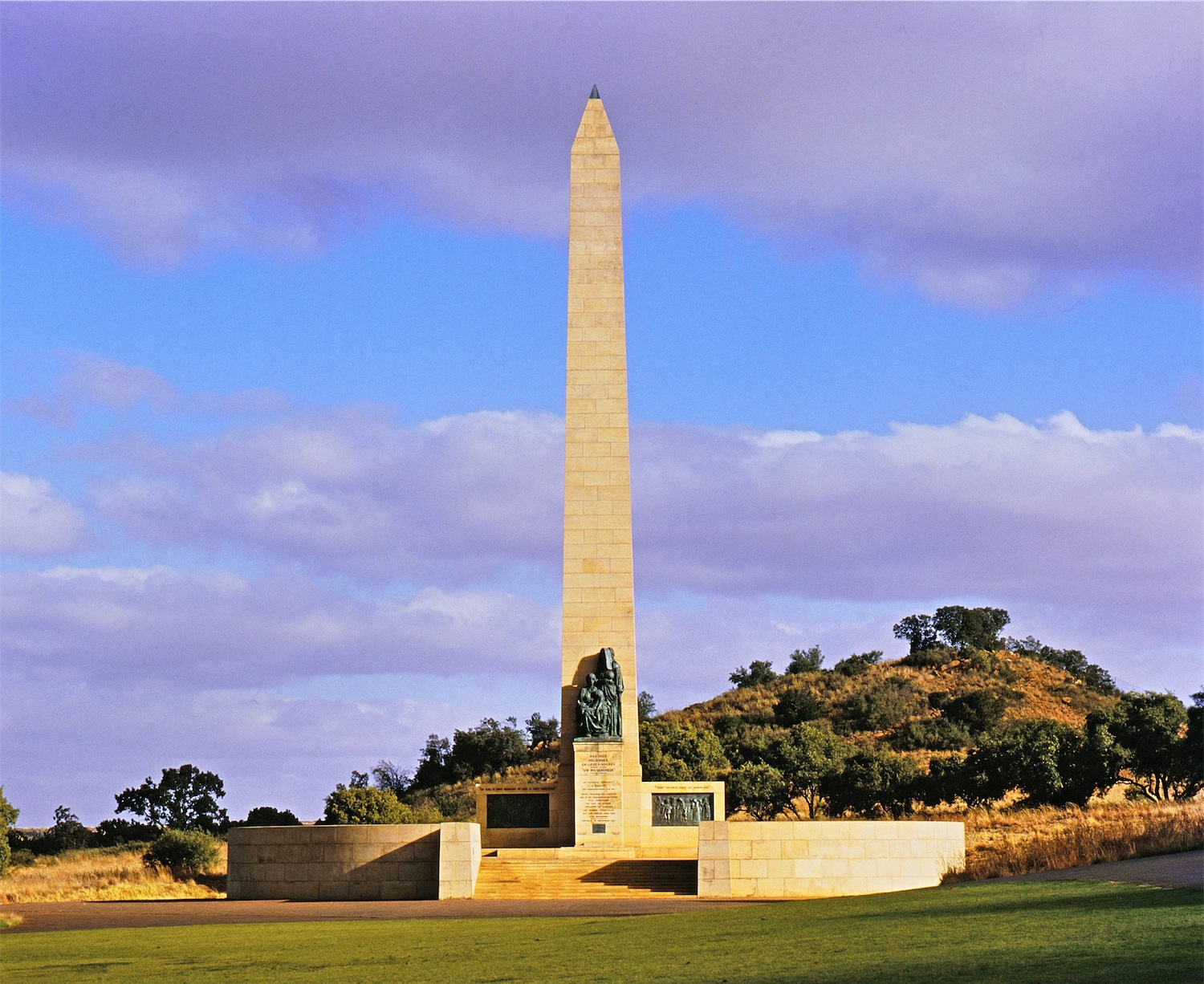
Complete monument

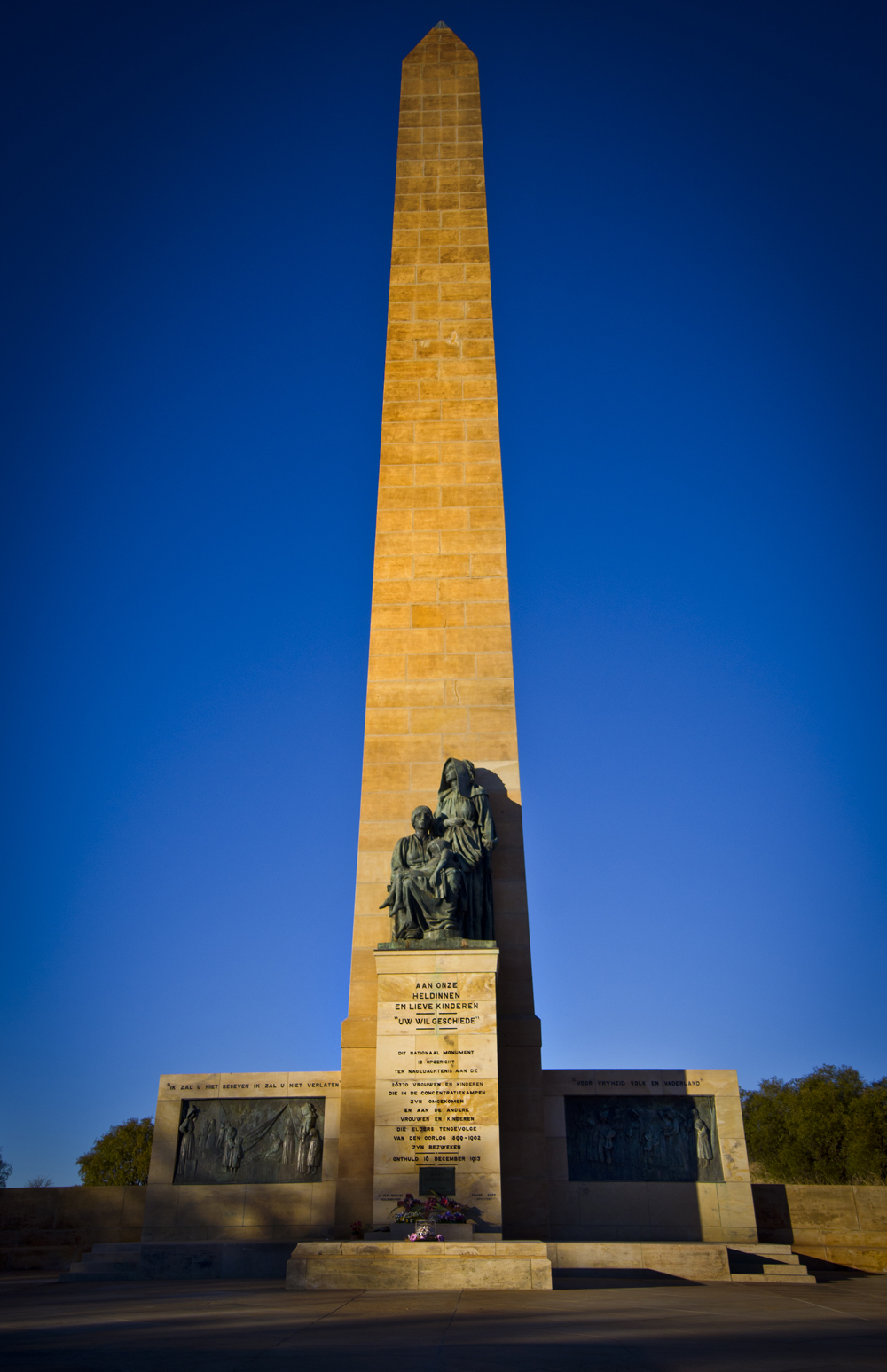
Sculpture and obelisk

== Bibliography ==
- Grundlingh, Albert. "The National Women's Monument. The Making and Mutation of Meaning in Afrikaner Memory of the South African War." Cuthbertson, Gregor; Grundlingh, Albert M.; and Suttie, Mary-Lynn (Hrsg.). Writing a Wider War. Rethinking Gender, Race, and Identity in the South African War, 1899–1902. Athens, Ohio:Ohio University Press. 2002. pp. 18–36.
- Marschall, Sabine. Serving Male Agendas. Two National Women's Monuments in South Africa. Women's Studies 33 (2004). pp. 1009–1033.
