= British blockhouses of the Second Boer War =

Fortifications in South Africa, 1899–1901

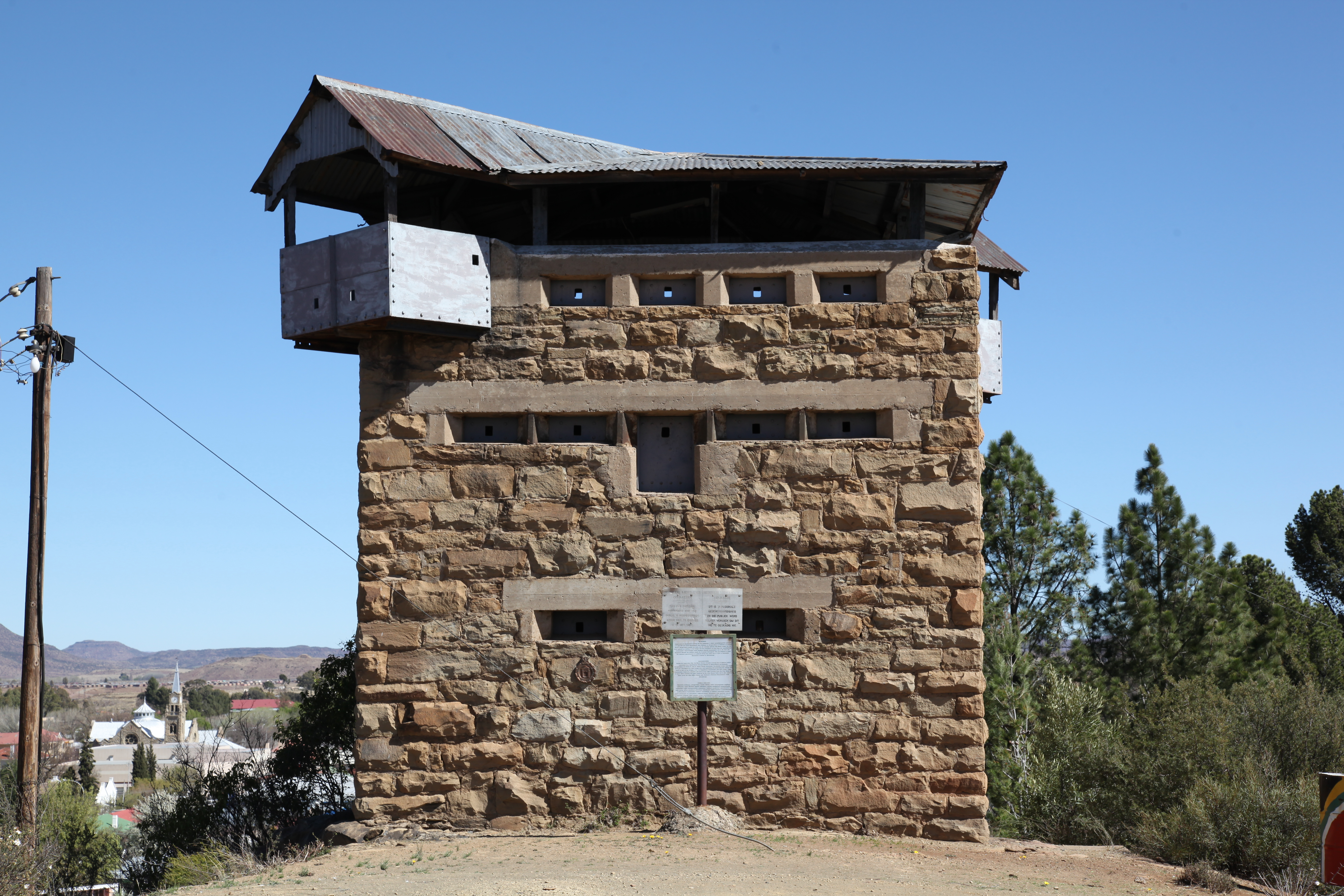
Sentinel Blockhouse in Burgersdorp

This is a list of blockhouses built by the British Empire in South Africa during the Second Anglo-Boer War from 1899–1901. Of the fortifications constructed during the war, around 441 were solid masonry blockhouses, many of which stand today. Different designs were used in the construction, but most were either two or three story structures built using locally quarried stone.

Name	Geo-coordinates	Region	Image
Blockhouse #1	30.70422°S 26.71543°E	Eastern Cape	
Buffelspruit Blockhouse	30.68756°S 26.71959°E	Eastern Cape	

- Aliwal North Blockhouses (2)
- Broederstroom Blockhouse
- Burgersdorp Blockhouse
- Dewetsville Blockhouse
- Fort Harlech, Krugersdorp
- Hekpoort Blockhouse
- Hopetown Blockhouse
- Kaalfontein/Zuurfontein Blockhouse
- Modder River Blockhouse
- Noupoort Blockhouse
- Orange River Station
- Pampoennek Blockhouse
- Prieska Blockhouse
- Riversford Blockhouse
- The Reservoir Blockhouse
- The Stormberg Junction South Blockhouse
- Timeball Hill Blockhouse
- The Warrenton Railway Bridge Blockhouse
- Warmbaths Blockhouse
- Witkop Blockhouse

== See also ==
- South African Heritage Resources Agency
- South African National Museum of Military History
- Provincial heritage site (South Africa)
- Military history of South Africa
- List of castles in Africa
- History of South Africa
- List of castles
- List of forts
