= List of literary awards =

This list of literary awards from around the world is an index to articles about notable literary awards.

== International awards ==
=== All nationalities and multiple languages eligible ===
- Nobel Prize in Literature – since 1901
- Hugo Award – since 1953
- Hans Christian Andersen Award – since 1956
- NIN Award − since 1954
- Golden Wreath of Struga Poetry Evenings – since 1966
- Neustadt International Prize for Literature – since 1970
- International Botev Prize – since 1972
- Bookseller/Diagram Prize for Oddest Title of the Year – since 1978
- America Award – since 1994
- Balint Balassi Memorial Sword Award – since 1997
- AATSEEL Book Awards – since 2000
- Franz Kafka Prize – since 2001, discontinued in 2021
- Ovid Prize – since 2002
- Astrid Lindgren Memorial Award – since 2003
- Dayton Literary Peace Prize – since 2006
- European Union Prize for Literature – since 2009
- Jan Michalski Prize – since 2009
- The Paris Literary Prize – since 2010
- Europese Literatuurprijs (European Literature Award) – since 2011
- KONS International Literary Award – since 2011
- Grand Prix of Literary Associations (English, French, and Spanish) – since 2013
- Zbigniew Herbert International Literary Award – since 2013

== Awards by language ==
=== Arabic ===
- Etisalat Award for Arabic Children's Literature
- International Prize for Arabic Fiction
- Katara Prize for Arabic Novel
- King Faisal International Prize for Arabic language and literature
- Naguib Mahfouz Medal for Literature
- Sheikh Zayed Book Award

=== Bengali ===
- Rabindra Puraskar
- Bankim Puraskar
- Ananda Puraskar
- Sahitya Akademi Award to Bengali Writers
- Bangla Academy Award

=== Chinese ===
- Mao Dun Literature Prize
- Lu Xun Literary Prize
- Lao She Literary Award
- Dream of the Red Chamber Award
- Shi Nai'an Literary Prize
- Newman Prize for Chinese Literature
- Bing Xin Children's Literature Award
- Blancpain-Imaginist Literary Prize

=== English ===
- Booker Prize – since 1969
- International Dublin Literary Award – since 1996
- Caine Prize – since 2000
- International Booker Prize – since 2005
- Next Generation Indie Book Awards – since 2007
- Queen Mary Wasafiri New Writing Prize – since 2009
- The Warwick Prize for Writing – since 2009
- International Rubery Book Award – since 2010
- Montreal International Poetry Prize – since 2011
- Windham–Campbell Literature Prizes – since 2011 or ’13
- Goldsmiths Prize – since 2013
- Warwick Prize for Women in Translation – since 2017
- ARA Historical Novel Prize – since 2020

=== German ===
- Georg Büchner Prize – for the overall literary oeuvre
- Sigmund Freud Prize – for scientific prose
- German Book Prize – for the best German language novel of the year
- Leipzig Book Fair Prize – in three categories: fiction, non-fiction, and translation
- Ingeborg Bachmann Prize
- Aspekte-Literaturpreis (Aspekte Literature Prize) – for the best debut novel written in German
- Kleist Prize – first awarded in 1912
- Merano Poetry Prize – established in 1993 for poetry
- International Literature Award – established in 2009 for international prose translated into German

=== Gujarati ===
- Kumar Suvarna Chandrak
- Narmad Suvarna Chandrak
- Premanand Suvarna Chandrak
- Ranjitram Suvarna Chandrak
- Sahitya Gaurav Puraskar
- Yuva Gaurav Puraskar (conferred to young authors)

=== Hebrew ===
- Bialik Prize
- Sapir Prize
- Tchernichovsky Prize (for translation)

=== Irish ===
- Gradam Uí Shúilleabháin
- Gradam Réics Carló
- Gradam de Bhaldraithe
- Irish Book Awards – since 2018

=== Italian ===
- Crotone Prize
- Strega Prize
- Premio Campiello
- Premio Bancarella
- Bagutta Prize
- Urania award (Science Fiction)

=== Kannada ===
- Rashtrakavi
- Nrupatunga Award
- Kanaka Shree
- Pampa Award

=== Malayalam ===
- Edasseri Award
- Ezhuthachan Puraskaram
- Kerala Sahitya Academy Award
- Muttathu Varkey Award
- Odakkuzhal Award
- Padmarajan Award
- Vallathol Award
- Vayalar Award

=== Marathi ===
- Vinda Karandikar Jeevan Gaurav Puraskar

=== Meitei (Manipuri) ===
- Sahitya Akademi Award for Meitei
- Sahitya Akademi Translation Prize for Meitei
- Yuva Puraskar for Meitei

=== Odia ===
- Odisha Sahitya Academy Award

=== Polish ===
- Angelus Award
- Gdynia Literary Prize
- Janusz A. Zajdel Award for science fiction
- Kazimierz Wyka Award
- Kościelski Award
- Kraków Book of the Month Award
- Nike Award
- Paszport Polityki for Literature
- Ryszard Kapuściński Award for Literary Reportage
- Silesius Poetry Award
- Śląkfa Award
- Wisława Szymborska Award

=== Portuguese ===
- Camões Prize
- Prémio Leya
- Portugal Telecom Prize for Literature (from 2007 onwards)
- São Paulo Prize for Literature

=== Spanish ===
- Miguel de Cervantes Prize
- Rómulo Gallegos Prize
- Sor Juana Inés de la Cruz Prize – female authors
- Premio Planeta
- Premio de Novela Ciudad de Torrevieja
- Premio Iberoamericano Planeta-Casa de América de Narrativa – since 2007
- Joaquín Gallegos Lara National Fiction Prize

=== Tamil ===
- Vishnupuram Award

=== Welsh ===
- Bardd Plant Cymru
- Chair of the National Eisteddfod of Wales
- Chair of the Urdd National Eisteddfod

== Awards by region ==
=== African ===
- Babishai Niwe Poetry Foundation
- Brunel University African Poetry Prize
- Caine Prize
- Etisalat Prize for Literature
- Golden Baobab Prize
- Grand prix Afrique
- Lotus Prize for Literature (discontinued)
- Noma Award for Publishing in Africa (discontinued)
- Nommo Awards
- Tchicaya U Tam'si Prize for African Poetry
- Wole Soyinka Prize for Literature in Africa

=== Asian ===
- Man Asian Literary Prize (discontinued)
- DSC Prize for South Asian Literature (discontinued)
- SAARC Literary Award
- Kiriyama Prize – for books about the Pacific Rim and South Asia; 1996–2008
- Pandit Sunderlal Sharma Literature Award

=== Caribbean literature ===
- Casa de las Américas Prize
- OCM Bocas Prize for Caribbean Literature

=== Commonwealth ===
- Booker Prize – winners and shortlisted authors
- Commonwealth Short Story Prize
- Commonwealth Writers' Prize (discontinued)
- Encore Award – since 1990
- John Llewellyn Rhys Prize

=== European Union ===
- European Union Prize for Literature
- European Book Prize

=== Nordic ===
- Nordic Council's Literature Prize
- Prisma

== Awards by country ==
=== American literature ===
- Aga Khan Prize for Fiction
- Aiken Taylor Award for Modern American Poetry
- Ambassador Book Award
- American Academy of Arts and Letters Gold Medals in Belles Lettres, Criticism and Essays
- American Academy of Arts and Letters Gold Medal in Drama
- American Academy of Arts and Letters Gold Medal for Fiction, Novels, Short Stories
- American Academy of Arts and Letters Gold Medal in Poetry
- American Book Awards
- Anisfield-Wolf Book Award
- Andrew Carnegie Medals for Excellence in Fiction and Nonfiction
- Arab American Book Award
- Arthur Rense Prize
- Asian American Literary Awards
- Asian/Pacific American Awards for Literature
- Bancroft Prize
- Banipal Prize for Arabic Literary Translation
- The Best American Poetry
- Best Translated Book Award
- Bobbitt National Prize for Poetry
- Bollingen Prize
- Bram Stoker Award
- Carter G. Woodson Book Award
- Center for Fiction First Novel Prize
- Christopher Hewitt Award
- Colorado Book Award
- Dana Award
- Donna J. Stone National Literary Awards
- Dos Passos Prize
- Drue Heinz Literature Prize
- Edgar Allan Poe Awards
- Edward Lewis Wallant Award
- Ernest J. Gaines Award for Literary Excellence
- Fabri Literary Prize
- Flannery O'Connor Award for Short Fiction
- Frost Medal
- Goldsmith Book Prize
- Gotham Book Prize
- Gregory Kolovakos Award
- Harold Morton Landon Translation Award
- Helen and Kurt Wolff Translator's Prize
- Hispanic Heritage Award for Literature
- Hopwood Award
- Hugo Award
- James Duval Phelan Award
- James Jones First Novel Award
- James Laughlin Award
- Janet Heidinger Kafka Prize
- Jackson Poetry Prize
- The John Esten Cooke Fiction Award
- Joseph Henry Jackson Award
- Kate Tufts Discovery Award
- Kingsley Tufts Poetry Award
- Lambda Literary Award – for LGBTQ literature
- Lannan Literary Awards
- Los Angeles Times Book Prize
- Mary Tanenbaum Award for Nonfiction
- Michael Braude Award for Light Verse
- Minnesota Book Award
- National Book Award
- National Book Critics Circle Award
- National Hispanic Cultural Center Literary Award
- National Jewish Book Award, Jewish Book Council
- National Outdoor Book Award
- National Poetry Series
- National Translation Award
- Native Writers' Circle of the Americas
- Nebula Award for Science Fiction
- Newbery Medal
- The New Criterion Poetry Prize
- O. Henry Awards (for short stories)
- Oregon Book Award
- Outstanding Latino/a Cultural Award in Literary Arts or Publications
- Peggy V. Helmerich Distinguished Author Award
- PEN Award for Poetry in Translation
- PEN/Book-of-the-Month Club Translation Prize
- PEN/Faulkner Award for Fiction
- PEN/Heim Translation Fund Grants
- PEN/Hemingway Award for Debut Novel
- PEN/Malamud Award (for short stories)
- PEN Oakland/Josephine Miles Literary Award (for diversity and multi-cultural work)
- PEN Open Book Award (formerly PEN/Beyond Margins; for writers of color)
- PEN/Ralph Manheim Medal for Translation
- Poets' Prize
- Premio Aztlán Literary Prize – emerging Chicana/o writers
- Publishing Innovation Award – ebooks and related technology
- Publishing Triangle's awards – for LGBTQ literature
- Pulitzer Prize for
  - History
  - Fiction
  - Poetry
  - Drama
  - General Nonfiction
- Pushcart Prize
- Quill Awards
- Raiziss/de Palchi Translation Awards
- RUSA awards
- Robert Olen Butler Prize
- Ruth Lilly Poetry Prize
- Scott Moncrieff Prize
- Sherwood Anderson Foundation Award
- Short Story Award
- Sophie Brody Award
- Spur Award
- St. Francis College Literary Prize
- St. Louis Literary Award
- Stone Award for Literary Achievement
- Stonewall Book Award – for LGBTQ literature
- The Story Prize
- Tomás Rivera Mexican American Children's Book Award
- Wallace Stevens Award
- Walt Whitman Award
- William Faulkner – William Wisdom Creative Writing Competition
- Whiting Awards
- Willis Barnstone Translation Prize
- Windham–Campbell Literature Prizes

=== Australian literature ===
- ACT Book of the Year
- Aurealis Award – awarded annually for Australian science fiction, fantasy and horror fiction
- The Australian/Vogel Literary Award – for unpublished manuscripts by writers under the age of 35
- Chief Minister's Northern Territory Book History Awards
- Miles Franklin Award – for the best Australian published novel or play portraying Australian life in any of its phases
- New South Wales Premier's Literary Awards
- Patrick White Award
- Prime Minister's Literary Awards
- Queensland Premier's Literary Awards
- South Australian Literary Awards
- Tasmanian Premier's Literary Prizes
- Victorian Premier's Literary Awards
- Western Australian Premier's Book Awards

=== Austrian literature ===
- Ingeborg Bachmann Prize
- Feldkircher Lyrikpreis
- Erich Fried Prize
- Franz Kafka Prize
- Austrian State Prize for European Literature
- Anton Wildgans Prize

=== Bangladesh literature ===
- Bangla Academy Award

=== Botswana literature ===
- Bessie Head Literature Awards

=== Brazilian literature ===
- Prêmio Jabuti
- Prêmio Machado de Assis
- São Paulo Prize for Literature

=== British literature ===
- Authors' Club Best First Novel Award
- Baillie Gifford Prize
- Betty Trask Prize and Awards
- Booker Prize
- British Book Awards – the "Nibbies"
- Chancellor's Gold Medal
- Commonwealth Short Story Prize
- Commonwealth Writers' Prize
- Costa Book Awards (discontinued in 2021)
- Dundee International Book Prize
- Duff Cooper Prize
- Forward Prizes for Poetry
- Hawthornden Prize
- International Booker Prize
- International Rubery Book Award
- James Tait Black Memorial Prize
- John Llewellyn Rhys Prize
- Marsh Biography Award – awarded biennially for the best biography written by a British author first published in the UK during the two preceding years.
- Marsh Award for Children's Literature in Translation – recognises the best translation of a children’s book from a foreign language into English and published in the UK.
- Meyer-Whitworth Award
- Newdigate Prize
- Orwell Prize
- PEN Hessell-Tiltman Prize
- SI Leeds Literary Prize
- Somerset Maugham Award
- T. S. Eliot Prize
- Waterstones Debut Fiction Prize
- Waverton Good Read Award
- Women's Prize for Fiction
- Women's Prize for Non-Fiction

=== Bulgarian literature ===
- Vick Prize

=== Canadian literature ===
- Arthur Ellis Award
- Atlantic Book Awards & Festival
- Booker Prize
- Burt Award for First Nations, Métis and Inuit Literature
- Canada Reads
- Canadian Jewish Book Awards
- Carol Bolt Award
- Commonwealth Writers' Prize
- Danuta Gleed Literary Award
- Dayne Ogilvie Prize
- Doug Wright Award
- Edna Staebler Award
- Geoffrey Bilson Award
- Gerald Lampert Award
- Griffin Poetry Prize
- Governor General's Award
- Herman Voaden Playwriting Competition
- Hilary Weston Writers' Trust Prize for Nonfiction
- Indigenous Voices Awards
- Innis-Gérin Medal
- John Glassco Translation Prize
- Journey Prize
- Kobzar Literary Award
- Lane Anderson Award
- Lorne Pierce Medal
- McNally Robinson Aboriginal Book of the Year Award
- McNally Robinson Book of the Year Award
- Matt Cohen Award: In Celebration of a Writing Life
- Milton Acorn People's Poetry Award
- Norma Fleck Award
- Pat Lowther Award
- Percy Janes First Novel Award
- Prix Anne-Hébert
- Prix Athanase-David
- Prix du Cercle du livre de France
- Prix Ringuet
- RBC Bronwen Wallace Award for Emerging Writers
- ReLit Awards
- Rogers Writers' Trust Fiction Prize
- Ryerson Fiction Award (discontinued)
- Scotiabank Giller Prize. In 2005, the Giller prize was renamed to the Scotiabank Giller Prize.
- Shaughnessy Cohen Award
- Stephen Leacock Award
- Sunburst Award
- TD Canadian Children's Literature Award
- Thomas Head Raddall Award
- Trillium Award
- Vicky Metcalf Award for Children's Literature
- Winterset Award
- Wright Awards
- Writers' Trust Distinguished Contribution Award
- Writers' Trust Engel/Findley Award

=== Chilean literature ===
- Chilean National Prize for Literature

=== Chinese literature ===
- Lu Xun Literary Prize
- Mao Dun Literature Prize
- Newman Prize for Chinese Literature

=== Costa Rican literature ===
- Premio Editorial Costa Rica

=== Croatian language ===
- Croatia rediviva: Ča, Kaj, Što - baštinski dani
- Nagrada Ksaver Šandor Gjalski
- Nagrada Matice Hrvatske

=== Czech literature ===
- Magnesia Litera Prize

=== Dutch literature ===
- Libris Literatuur Prijs
- De Boon
- Boekenleeuw (discontinued)
- Bookspot Literatuurprijs

=== Ecuadorian literature ===
- Joaquín Gallegos Lara National Fiction Prize
- Premio Eugenio Espejo

=== Estonian literature ===
- Friedebert Tuglas short story award
- Juhan Smuul literary award

=== Finnish literature ===
- Finlandia Prize for literature
- Helsingin Sanomat Literature Prize
- Runeberg Prize for literature
- Thanks for the Book Award for literature

=== French literature ===
- Grand Prix du roman de l'Académie française
- Grand Prix de Littérature Policière
- Prix Alain-Fournier
- Prix Décembre
- Prix des Deux-Magots
- Prix Femina
- Prix Fénéon
- Prix de Flore
- Prix du roman Fnac
- Prix Goncourt
- Prix Interallié
- Prix Littéraire Valery Larbaud
- Prix Médicis
- Prix Mystère de la critique
- Prix de la Page 112
- Prix du Quai des Orfèvres
- Prix Renaudot
- Candide Preis (the only German-French Literary award)

=== Georgian literature ===
- Shota Rustaveli State Prize

=== German literature ===
- Bertelsmann-Preisausschreiben
- Bertolt-Brecht-Literaturpreis
- Candide Preis – German-French literary award in memory of Voltaire's novella Candide – since 1995
- Carl Zuckmayer Medal – annual literary prize awarded by the state of Rhineland Palatinate in memory of Carl Zuckmayer
- Deutscher Jugendliteraturpreis
- Fontane Prize of the City of Neuruppin
- German Book Prize – awarded annually during the Frankfurt Book Fair for the best German language novel of the year
- Georg Büchner Prize – awarded annually by the Deutsche Akademie für Sprache und Dichtung in memory of Georg Büchner
- Goethe Prize – awarded triennially by the city of Frankfurt in memory of Johann Wolfgang von Goethe; since 1927
- Hanseatic Goethe Prize
- Heinrich Heine Prize
- Hermann-Hesse-Preis
- Hans Fallada Prize – biennial literary prize in memory of Hans Fallada
- Heinrich Mann Prize
- Hermann Kesten Medal
- Ingeborg Bachmann Prize (Austrian)
- Kassel Literary Prize
- Kleist Prize
- Kurd-Laßwitz-Preis – annual science fiction award in memory of Kurd Laßwitz, inspired by the American Nebula Award
- Leipzig Book Fair Prize
- Merck Kakehashi Literature Prize
- Nelly Sachs Prize
- Roswitha Prize
- Schiller Memorial Prize
- Toucan Prize

=== Hungarian literature ===
- Balint Balassi Memorial Sword Award – for poets and translators; since 1997
- Baumgarten Prize
- Kossuth Prize

=== Icelandic literature ===
- Icelandic Literary Prize

=== Indian literature ===
- Jnanpith Award
- Sahitya Akademi Award
- Pampa Award
- Saraswati Samman
- Kalaimamani Award
- Yuva Puraskar (conferred to young authors)
- Vinda Karandikar Jeevan Gaurav Puraskar
- Jibanananda Das Award
- Tagore Award
- Assam Valley Literary Award
- All India Poetry Prize

=== Indonesian literature ===
- Jakarta Arts Council Novel Competition

=== Iranian literature ===
- Jalal Al-e Ahmad Literary Awards
- Persian Speculative Art and Literature Award

=== Irish literature ===
- Gradam Uí Shúilleabháin
- Gradam Réics Carló
- Gradam de Bhaldraithe
- Irish Book Awards
- The Francis MacManus Award

=== Israeli literature ===
- ACUM Awards
- Bialik Prize
- Geffen Award
- Jerusalem Prize – since 1963
- Sapir Prize
- Yitzhak Sadeh Prize

=== Italian literature ===
- Bagutta Prize
- Premio Bancarella
- Premio Campiello
- Premio Strega
- Premio Urania
- Viareggio Prize
- Flaiano Prize

=== Japanese literature ===
- Akutagawa Prize
- Bungei Prize
- Dazai Osamu Prize
- Edogawa Rampo Prize
- Honkaku Mystery Award
- Izumi Kyōka Prize for Literature (Izumi Kyōka Bungaku Shō)
- Kikuchi Kan Prize (Kan Kikuchi Shō)
- Mishima Yukio Prize
- Mystery Writers of Japan Award
- Naoki Prize (Naoki Sanjūgo Shō)
- Noma Prize for Literature
- Ōe Kenzaburō Prize
- Sense of Gender Awards – since 2001
- Shimase Love Literature Prize
- Tanizaki Prize
- Yamamoto Shūgorō Prize
- Yomiuri Prize for Literature

=== Luxembourgian literature ===
- Batty Weber Prize
- Servais Prize

=== Malaysian literature ===
- Malaysia Premier's Literary Award
- Malaysian National Laureate

=== Mexican literature ===
- Premio Nacional de Lingüística y Literatura
- Nezahualcóyotl Award
- Xavier Villaurrutia Award
- FIL Literary Award in Romance Languages

=== Nepalese Literature ===
- Madan Puraskar

=== New Zealand literature ===
- Esther Glen Award – for children's literature
- Joy Cowley Award – for children's literature
- Sir Julius Vogel Award – for science fiction and fantasy
- Ockham New Zealand Book Awards
- Ngaio Marsh Award
- Margaret Mahy Award
- Prime Minister's Awards for Literary Achievement

=== Nigerian literature ===
- Nigeria Prize for Literature
- Wole Soyinka Prize for Literature in Africa
- 9mobile Prize for Literature
- Engineer Mohammed Bashir Karaye Prize for Hausa Writing – for works in the Hausa language

=== Norwegian literature ===
- Halldis Moren Vesaas Prize
- NBU-prisen
- Norwegian Academy Prize in memory of Thorleif Dahl
- Norwegian Academy of Literature and Freedom of Expression
- Norwegian Critics Prize for Literature

=== Philippine literature ===
- Palanca Award
- Philippine National Book Awards

=== Polish literature ===
- Angelus Award
- Found in Translation Award
- Gdynia Literary Prize
- Janusz A. Zajdel Award for science fiction
- Kazimierz Wyka Award
- Kościelski Award
- Kraków Book of the Month Award
- Nautilus Award
- Nike Award
- Paszport Polityki for Literature
- Ryszard Kapuściński Award for Literary Reportage
- Silesius Poetry Award
- Śląkfa Award
- Wisława Szymborska Award

=== Portuguese literature ===
- Prémio Camões

=== Russian literature ===
- Solzhenitsyn Prize
- Russian Booker Prize
- Pushkin Prize
- Yasnaya Polyana Literary Award

=== Serbian literature ===
- Isidora Sekulić Award
- NIN Award

=== Singaporean literature ===
- Epigram Books Fiction Prize
- Singapore Literature Prize

=== Slovene literature ===
- Fabula Award
- Jenko Award
- KONS International Literary Award
- Kresnik Award
- Levstik Award
- Prešeren Award
- Prešeren Foundation Award
- Rožanc Award
- Veronika Award
- Vilenica Prize

=== South African literature ===
- Alan Paton Award
- Alba Bouwer Prize
- Amstel Playwright of the Year Award
- ATKV Prose Prize
- Barry Ronge Fiction Prize
- C.P. Hoogenhout Award
- Central News Agency Literary Award
- David Higham Prize for Fiction
- Dinaane Debut Fiction Award
- Exclusive Books Boeke Prize
- Eugène Marais Prize
- Hertzog Prize
- Ingrid Jonker Prize
- M-Net Literary Awards
- Maskew Miller Longman Literature Awards
- Media24 Books Literary Awards
- Olive Schreiner Prize
- Percy FitzPatrick Award
- Sol Plaatje Prize for Translation
- South African Literary Awards
- Sunday Times CNA Literary Awards
- The Cape Tercentenary Foundation
- Thomas Pringle Award
- University of Johannesburg Prize
- W.A Hofmeyr Prize

=== South Korean literature ===
- Dong-in Literary Award
- Hyundae Munhak Award
- Manhae Prize
- Yi Sang Literary Award
- So-Wol Poetry Prize
- Park Kyung-ni Prize
- Ho-Am Prize in the Arts

=== Spanish literature ===
- Miguel de Cervantes Prize
- Premio Nadal
- Premio Planeta
- Premio de Novela Ciudad de Torrevieja
- Rómulo Gallegos Prize
- Premio Nacional de Literatura
- Premio Azorín
- Premio de la Crítica
- Premi Prudenci Bertrana
- Prince of Asturias Awards – since 1981
- Premio Tusquets de Novela

=== Sri Lankan literature ===
- Gratiaen Prize
- State Literary Award

=== Swedish literature ===
- Augustpriset
- De Nios Stora Pris
- Best Swedish Crime Novel Award – awarded by Swedish Crime Writers' Academy

=== Swiss literature ===
- Max Frisch Prize
- Solothurner Literaturpreis
- Swiss Book Prize

=== Thai literature ===
- S.E.A.Write Award
- Sriburapha Award

=== Turkish literature ===
- Erdal Oz Literature Award
- Sedat Simavi Literature Award

=== Ukrainian literature ===
- Shevchenko National Prize – since 1961

=== Venezuelan literature ===
- Adriano González León Biennial Novel Prize

=== Zimbabwean literature ===
- National Arts Merit Awards

== Awards by genres ==
=== Children's literature ===
- Newbery Medal and Newbery Honor (USA) – since 1922
- Carnegie Medal (UK) – since 1936
- Caldecott Medal and Caldecott Honor (USA) for illustration – since 1938
- Children's Book Council of Australia Awards (Australia) – since 1946
- Governor General's Award for English language children's literature (Canada) – since 1949
- Jane Addams Children's Book Award (USA) – since 1953
- Children's Literature Legacy Award (USA) – since 1954, formerly the Laura Ingalls Wilder Medal
- Hans Christian Andersen Award (international) – since 1956
- Kate Greenaway Medal for illustration (UK) – since 1956
- Deutscher Jugendliteraturpreis (Germany/international) – since 1956
- Dorothy Canfield Fisher Children's Book Award (USA) – since 1957
- Nienke van Hichtum-prijs (Netherlands) – since 1964
- Guardian Award (UK) – since 1967
- Sydney Taylor Book Award for Jewish children's and teen literature – since 1968
- Coretta Scott King Award for African-American Literature (USA) – since 1970
- Tir na n-Og Awards (Wales, UK) – since 1976
- Nestlé Smarties Book Prize (UK) – 1985–2007
- Prix Sorcières (France) – since 1986
- Governor General's Award for French language children's literature (Canada) – since 1987
- KPMG Children's Books Ireland Awards (Ireland) – since 1990
- Anne V. Zarrow Award for Young Readers' Literature (USA) – since 1991
- The Eilis Dillon Award (Ireland) – since 1995
- Angus Book Award (UK) – since 1996
- Pura Belpré Award for Latino literature (USA) – since 1996
- Marsh Award for Children’s Literature in Translation (UK) – since 1996
- Children's Laureate (UK) – since 1999
- Michael L. Printz Award for young adult literature (USA) – since 2000
- Sibert Medal for informational books (USA) – since 2001
- Mildred L. Batchelder Award (USA)
- Super Dash Novel Rookie of the Year Award (Japan) – since 2001
- Astrid Lindgren Memorial Award (international) – since 2003
- NSK Neustadt Prize for Children's Literature – since 2003
- Gelett burgess children's book award (USA) – since 2010
- Gradam Réics Carló – for children's literature in the Irish language

=== Food and drink ===
- Langhe Ceretto Prize (international) – since 1991

=== History ===
- Cundill History Prize for historical non-fiction – since 2008
- Duff Cooper Prize — since 1956
- Wolfson History Prize – since 1972

=== Horror fiction ===
- Bram Stoker Award – for superior achievement in horror writing, since 1987
- Shirley Jackson Award – for outstanding achievement in the literature of psychological suspense, horror and the dark fantastic, since 2007.
- Lord Ruthven Award – for the best fiction on vampires and the best academic work on the study of the vampire figure in culture and literature – since 1989

=== Military fiction and military history ===
- Colby Award for a first work of fiction or nonfiction – since 1999
- Pritzker Military Literature Award for Lifetime Achievement in Military Writing – since 2007
- W.Y. Boyd Literary Award for Excellence in Military Fiction – since 1997

=== Mystery: crime fiction and detective fiction ===
- Agatha Award
- Agatha Christie Award (Japan)
- Anthony Award
- Arthur Ellis Awards by the Crime Writers of Canada
- Ayukawa Tetsuya Award
- Barry Award
- Best Swedish Crime Novel Award – awarded by Swedish Crime Writers' Academy
- Crime Writers' Association awards:
  - Cartier Diamond Dagger
  - Dagger in the Library
  - Dagger of Daggers
  - Duncan Lawrie International Dagger
  - Gold Dagger
  - Ian Fleming Steel Dagger
  - Short Story Award
- Davitt Award
- Glass Key award
- Grand Prix de Littérature Policière
- Hammett Prize
- Honkaku Mystery Award – awarded by Honkaku Mystery Writers Club of Japan
- Japan Adventure Fiction Association Prize
- Left Coast Crime awards
  - Lefty award
  - The Bruce Alexander Memorial Historical Mystery
- Macavity Award
- Martin Beck Award
- Mephisto Prize
- Mystery Writers of America awards:
  - Edgar Award
- Mystery Writers of Japan awards:
  - Mystery Writers of Japan Award
  - Edogawa Rampo Prize
- Ned Kelly Awards
- Shamus Award
- Staunch Book Prize
- Theakston's Old Peculier Crime Novel of the Year Award

=== Romance fiction ===
- RITA Award
- Rona Award

=== Speculative fiction (science fiction and fantasy) ===
- Hugo Award – since 1955
- Nebula Award – since 1965
- Ditmar Award (Australia) – since 1969
- BSFA award – since 1970
- Seiun Award – since 1970
- Locus Award – since 1971
- Mythopoeic Awards – awards for the best of mythic fantasy, following in the tradition of J. R. R. Tolkien and C.S. Lewis – since 1971
- Prix Tour-Apollo Award – since 1972
- John W. Campbell Memorial Award for Best Science Fiction Novel – since 1973
- John W. Campbell Award for Best New Writer in Science Fiction – since 1973
- World Fantasy Award – since 1975
- Paul Harland Prize (Netherlands) – since 1976
- Prometheus Award – best Libertarian SF – since 1979
- Nihon SF Taisho Award – since 1980
- Prix Aurora Award (Canada) – since 1980
- Prix Rosny-Aîné (France) – since 1980
- Kurd-Laßwitz-Preis (Germany) – since 1981
- Philip K. Dick Award – since 1982
- Compton Crook Award – best first-time novel in genre in a year, since 1983
- Janusz A. Zajdel Award (Poland) – since 1984
- Writers of the Future – contest for new authors, since 1985
- Tähtivaeltaja Award (Finland) – since 1986
- Arthur C. Clarke Award – since 1987
- Japan Fantasy Novel Award – since 1989
- Sir Julius Vogel Award (New Zealand) – since 1989
- Urania Award (Italy) – since 1989
- SFRA Pioneer Award – best critical essay-length work, since 1990
- Tiptree award – since 1991
- Chandler Award (Australia) – since 1992
- Sidewise Award for Alternate History – since 1995
- Aurealis Award (Australia) – since 1995
- Thomas D. Clareson Award for Distinguished Service – promotion of SF teaching and study, etc., since 1996
- Endeavour Award (Pacific Northwest) – since 1999
- Nautilus Award (Poland) – since 2003
- WSFA Small Press Award – since 2007
- Tähtifantasia Award (Finland) – since 2007
- Kitschies (UK) – since 2009
- Nommo Awards – since 2016
- Ignyte Awards – since 2020

=== Sports ===
==== General ====
- William Hill Sports Book of the Year (UK)
- British Sports Book Awards (UK)
- PEN/ESPN Award for Literary Sports Writing (US)

==== Baseball ====
- CASEY Award (US)
- Seymour Medal (US)

=== Biography ===
- Marsh Biography Award – awarded biennially for the best biography written by a British author and first published in the UK during the two preceding years.

== Awards by identity ==
These awards include those given to authors of a specific identity or community, or works centering related characters or themes.

=== Disability ===
- Barbellion Prize (UK) – English works by writers with chronic illness or disability
- Kenny Fries Disabled Writer Literary Award (US) – disabled or deaf writers
- Disability History Association's Outstanding Publication Award (US) – works about disability history
- Schneider Family Book Award (US) – children's and YA works portraying disability

=== Gender ===
- Carol Shields Prize for Fiction (Canada, US) – works by women or non-binary authors
- Rose Mary Crawshay Prize (UK) – works about English literature, written by women
- Barbara Jefferis Award (Australia) – works that represent women or girls positively, by Australian writers
- Chommanard Book Prize (Thailand) – works by women from ASEAN countries or China or Taiwan
- Davitt Award (Australia) – crime fiction by Australian women
- Lambda Literary Award for Transgender Literature (US) – works about transgender people and themes
- Leslie Feinberg Award for Trans and Gender-Variant Literature (US) – works by trans and gender-nonconforming writers
- Lulu Awards (US) – women in comics and works recognizing comics by or for women
- Janet Heidinger Kafka Prize (US) – works by American women
- Marian Engel Award (Canada) – Canadian women novelists
- Murasaki Shikibu Prize (Japan) – Japanese works by women
- Otherwise Award (US) – works expanding the concept of gender
- Nita Kibble Literary Award (Australia) – works by Australian women
- Pat Lowther Award (Canada) – poetry books by women and non-binary writers
- Rapallo Carige Prize (Italy) – works by emerging women writers
- Roswitha Prize (Germany) – women writers of German works
- Sense of Gender Awards (Japan) – works expanding the concept of gender
- SI Leeds Literary Prize (UK) – unpublished works by UK Black and Asian women and womxn
- Sor Juana Inés de la Cruz Prize (Mexico) – Spanish works by women
- Stella Prize (Australia) – works by Australian women and non-binary writers
- Susan Smith Blackburn Prize (US, UK) – English plays by women+ writers
- Warwick Prize for Women in Translation (UK) – works by women that have been translated into English
- Women's Prize for Fiction (UK) – English novels by women
- Women's Prize for Non-Fiction (UK) – English works by women

=== LGBTQ+ ===
- Alice B Readers Awards (US) – writers of lesbian fiction
- Bisexual Book Awards (US) – works of bisexual literature
- Blue Metropolis Violet Prize (Canada) – established LGBTQ writers
- Dayne Ogilvie Prize (Canada) – emerging LGBTQ writers
- Gaylactic Spectrum Awards – (US) – works of speculative fiction by North American authors
- Goldie Awards (US) – works of sapphic literature
- Lambda Literary Awards (US) – English works on LGBTQ themes
- Polari Prize (UK) – works on LGBTQ themes by authors from the UK and Ireland
- Publishing Triangle Awards (US) – English works on LGBTQ themes
- Rainbow Awards (India) – LGBTQ works by Indian authors
- Ruth Benedict Prize (US) – anthropology works on LGBT topics
- Stonewall Book Awards (US) – originally the Gay Book Award

=== Race and ethnicity ===
- Anisfield-Wolf Book Award (US)
- American Indian Youth Literature Award (US)
- Américas Award (US)
- Asian/Pacific American Awards for Literature (US)
- Hurston/Wright Legacy Award (US)
- Indigenous Voices Awards (Canada)
- Langston Hughes Medal (US)
- Nezahualcóyotl Award (Mexico)

== Miscellaneous ==
- Goodreads Choice Awards

== Awards for literary translation ==
- Gregory Kolovakos Award – PEN America : U.S. literary translator, editor, or critic whose work ... extends Gregory Kolovakos's commitment to the richness of Hispanic literature and to expanding its English-language audience
- PEN Translation Prize – awarded annually for a translation from any language into English.
- Oxford-Weidenfeld Translation Prize – awarded annually for a book-length translation from any language into English.
- Rossica Translation Prize – awarded biennially by Academia Rossica to a translation from Russian into English.
- National Book Award for Translated Literature – awarded annually for a fiction or non-fiction translation from any language into English by the National Book Award
- National Translation Award – annual prize awarded by the American Literary Translators Association
- Popescu Prize – awarded biennially for a translation of poetry from a European language into English. Awarded by the Poetry Society.
- Willis Barnstone Translation Prize – annually awarded to a translation of a poem from any language into English.
- Scott Moncrieff Prize – awarded annually for French to English translation.
- Banipal Prize for Arabic Literary Translation – awarded annually for Arabic to English literary translation.
- Sol Plaatje Prize for Translation – awarded for a translation of prose or poetry into English from any other of the South African official languages.
- Rossica Young Translators Prize – open to submissions from translators aged under 25, awarded annually for the translation of a passage of contemporary fiction from Russian into English.
- Harvill Secker Young Translators Prize – open to submissions from translators aged between 18 and 34, awarded annually, focusing on a different language every year.
- International Dublin Literary Award – since 1996
- Helen and Kurt Wolff Translator's Prize – since 1996
- Warwick Prize for Women in Translation
- Gradam de Bhaldraithe – annual award for literature translated into Irish from another language

== Awards for literary criticism ==
- Nona Balakian Citation for Excellence in Reviewing – awarded annually for literary criticism as one of the National Book Critics Circle Awards.
- Truman Capote Award for Literary Criticism – awarded annually for literary criticism by the University of Iowa on behalf of the Truman Capote Literary Trust.
- Kerala Sahitya Akademi Award for Literary Criticism – awarded to Malayalam language literary criticism, as a category of the Kerala Sahitya Akademi Award

== See also ==
- List of poetry awards
- List of comics awards
- List of Australian literary awards
- List of the world's richest literary prizes
