= Timeline of fictional stories set in Vatican City =

This is a chronology of notable fictional and semi-fictional stories (including films, episodes in TV series, as well as literary works) that are set, either wholly or partially, in Vatican City, Rome. The years listed refer to the year of release of the works.

== 1960s ==
- 1961 - The Agony and Ecstasy, a novel by Irving Stone
- 1963 - The Cardinal, starring Tom Tryon
- 1965 October - The Agony and the Ecstasy, a film starring Charlton Heston as Michelangelo and Rex Harrison as Pope Julius II

== 1970s ==
- 1972 August - Pope Joan, with Liv Ullmann in the title role.

== 1990s ==
- 1991 May - Hudson Hawk, with Bruce Willis in the title role.
- 1991 August - The Pope Must Die, a comedy film starring Robbie Coltrane.
- 1997 - The Genesis Code, a novel by John Case.

== 2000s ==
- 2000 - Angels & Demons, a novel by Dan Brown.
- 2003 - The Confessor by Daniel Silva.
- 2004 May - Van Helsing, with Hugh Jackman in the title role.
- 2005 May - The Third Secret by Steve Berry.
- 2006 May - Mission: Impossible III, with Tom Cruise in the lead role.
- 2006 June - The Omen, a film with includes scenes set in the Vatican.
- 2007 April - God's Spy, a novel by Juan Gómez-Jurado.
- 2009 May - Angels & Demons, a film with Tom Hanks in the lead role.
- 2009 October - Pope Joan, with Johanna Wokalek in the title role.
- 2009 November – 2012, with John Cusack in the lead role. The film has an apocalyptic scene in which Vatican is destroyed.

== 2010s ==
- 2011 February - V, season 2, episode 4 "Unholy Alliance", and episode 5 "Concordia".
- 2012 January–February - Il tredicesimo apostolo, season 1 "Il prescelto".
- 2014 January–February - Il tredicesimo apostolo, season 2 "La rivelazione".
- 2016 - Conclave, a novel by Robert Harris.

== 2020s ==
- 2023 April - The Pope's Exorcist, in which Russell Crowe stars as an exorcist.
- 2024 October - Conclave, with Ralph Fiennes in the lead role. A film adaptation of the Robert Harris novel.

== See also ==
- Index of Vatican City-related articles
