= The Third Secret =

The Third Secret may refer to:

- The third of the Three Secrets of Fátima, which three children in Fátima, Portugal said they were told in a series of Marian apparitions in 1917. There is considerable controversy around the content of the third secret and the timing of its release.
- The Third Secret (film), a 1964 British film directed by Charles Crichton
- The Third Secret (novel), a 2005 American novel by Steve Berry
- The Third Secret, a 2018 album by American heavy metal band Fifth Angel
