= Wilhelm Kühne (disambiguation) =

Wilhelm Kühne may refer to:

- Wilhelm Kühne (1837–1900), German physiologist
- Wilhelm Kühne (aviator) (1888–1918), German World War I flying ace
- Wilhelm Otto Kühne (1924–1988), author of children's literature and editor in Cape Town, South Africa

== See also ==
- Kühne (disambiguation)
