= The Venetian Betrayal =

2007 thriller novel by Steve Berry

- First edition cover
- Author: Steve Berry
- Language: English
- Series: Cotton Malone
- Release number: 2
- Genre: Thriller, Spy fiction
- Publisher: Ballantine Books
- Publication date: December 11, 2007
- Publication place: United States
- Media type: Print (Hardcover), Audio, eBook
- Pages: 473 (Hardcover)
- ISBN: 978-0-345-48577-9
- Preceded by: The Alexandria Link
- Followed by: The Charlemagne Pursuit

The Venetian Betrayal is a thriller novel by Steve Berry, first published in December 2007. It was Berry's third book in Cotton Malone series, featuring former U.S. Justice Department operative Cotton Malone. It was preceded by The Alexandria Link, and was followed by The Charlemagne Pursuit.

Random House Audio released an audiobook simultaneously with the hardcover copy, narrated by Scott Brick.

== Plot ==
In 323 BC Babylon, Alexander the Great executes his physician for failing to save his lover Hephaestion using a mysterious draught, and reveals that he has a fever that could well kill him without it.

Cotton Malone is preparing to meet with his friend Cassiopeia Vitt in Copenhagen when he finds himself in a burning museum, which Cassiopeia saves him from. She and Henrik Thorvaldsen tell Malone that everything relates to elephant medallions commemorating Alexander's India invasion, and that they're planning a way to discover who is behind the thefts of medallions across Europe, though they suspect Irina Zovastina, who is the Supreme Minister of the Central Asian Federation. Zovastina is planning to conquer all of her neighbors and do the reverse of what Alexander did, through the means of biological weapons. But she doesn't own the cure. Pharmaceutical tycoon Enrico Vincenti, head of the Venetian League, provides it to her. He sees the cure as an opportunity to vastly increase his wealth.

Henrik tells Malone that Cassiopeia's dear friend and possible lover was working for Zovastina when she believes Zovastina killed him for what he knew. Stephanie Nelle becomes involved trying to retrieve a medallion for Cassiopeia, but President Danny Daniels and Deputy National Security Adviser Edwin Davis ask her to go after Vincenti. Everyone heads to Venice, where Cassiopeia tries to kill two members of Zovastina's guard, including Viktor Tomas, whose loyalties seem unclear. Zovastina is trying to solve a riddle from Ptolemy to find Alexander's grave and believes the body in St. Mark's Basilica holds the key, negotiating with Monsignor Colin Michener to see it. After a standoff in the basilica, Zovastina takes Cassiopeia captive to guarantee herself safe passage back to Samarkand (her capital), and Michener reveals to Malone and company that he has been acting as a spy for the pope, and Viktor Tomas is an American spy.

Vincenti reveals to his chief scientist that the cure for Zovastina's viruses is the cure for AIDS, and kidnaps her lesbian lover, who is dying of AIDS, to be his weapon against her. In Samarkand, Zovastina prepares to execute Cassiopeia, but Malone and Viktor save her, even while Stephanie and Henrik find Cassiopeia's friend, Ely Lund, who is not dead after all. Everyone ends up at Vincenti's Asian estate, where a mountain contains the draught/cure and the entrance to Alexander's tomb. Zovastina kills Vincenti, and thought Viktor is shown to have told her about his spying for America, he gives Cassiopeia the control to blow up Zovastina's helicopter, which she does. A month later, Cassiopeia shows up in Copenhagen to visit Malone, which signals the start of a deeper relationship.
