= Nezahualcoyotl =

Nezahualcoyotl may refer to:

- Nezahualcoyotl (tlatoani), the ruler of Texcoco
- Ciudad Nezahualcóyotl, a city in the State of Mexico
- Nezahualcóyotl metro station, in Mexico City
- The Nezahualcóyotl Award, a literary prize in Mexico
- Nezahualcóyotl (Mexibús), a BRT station in Nezahualcóyotl, Mexico
- Malpaso Dam, officially the Nezahualcóyotl Dam
