= Kobus Geldenhuys =

South African scriptwriter and translator

- Occupations: scriptwriter and translator of children's literature into Afrikaans

Kobus Geldenhuys is a South African scriptwriter and translator of children's literature into Afrikaans, including titles by J. K. Rowling, C. S. Lewis, Roald Dahl, Michael Morpurgo, David Walliams and Cressida Cowell. In 2016 he won the Alba Bouwer Prize for his translation of Morpurgo's Why the Whales Came as Hoekom die walvisse gekom het. He has also translated Tove Jansson.

Geldenhuys has translated two books by Jaco Jacobs from Afrikaans into English: A Good Day for Climbing Trees (nominated for the 2019 CILIP Carnegie Medal) and A Good Night for Shooting Zombies.
