= The Alexandria Link =

2007 novel by Steve Berry

- First edition cover
- Author: Steve Berry
- Language: English
- Series: Cotton Malone
- Release number: 2
- Genre: Thriller, historical
- Publisher: Ballantine Books
- Publication date: January 30, 2007
- Publication place: United States
- Media type: Print (Hardcover), Audio, eBook
- Pages: 462
- ISBN: 978-0-345-48575-5
- Preceded by: The Templar Legacy
- Followed by: The Venetian Betrayal

The Alexandria Link is a 2007 thriller novel by Steve Berry. It was Berry's second book in Cotton Malone series, featuring Cotton Malone is a retired top operative for the "Magellan Billet," an elite division within the U.S. Justice Department. It was preceded by The Templar Legacy, and was followed by The Venetian Betrayal.

== Plot ==
The Library of Alexandria was the most important collection of ancient knowledge ever assembled. The building stood for six hundred years and contained more than half a million manuscripts. Then suddenly it vanished. No trace of this literary treasure has ever been unearthed.

The book starts in Palestine in 1948, just as the European colony on Palestine dubbed Israel was being established. During the 1948 Arab–Israeli War, a man is captured by Arab soldiers and taken to George Haddad who is surprised to find that this man is actually looking for his father and has some hidden truth to share. He mentions that Arabs are fighting a war that is unnecessary, against an enemy that is misinformed. Unable to learn more, the leader decides to shoot the mysterious man.

In present-day Copenhagen, Denmark, Cotton Malone is in trouble. His son Gary is being held hostage by unknown enemies who want to trade him for the secret of the Alexandria Link. Malone is the only living person who is aware of it. He receives an anonymous email saying that he has only 72 hours to get it and trade with them. He and his ex-wife Pam visit Malone's influential friend Henrik Thorvaldsen's mansion to use methamphetamines. A mysterious man, Dominick Icculus Sabre, is following them all the time.

Stephanie Nelle and her boss, United States Attorney General Brent Green, contacts Larry Daley, the main contact in the White House who knows more than them about the Link. Green says that the Link is in fact a person named George Haddad, a Palestinian biblical soldier.

Malone uses Thorvaldsen's computer to log into his "Magellan Billet" secure server, which was accessible to him when he used to work for the justice department. He contacts his former boss, Stephanie Nelle, for more information. She mentions that there was some security breach and some secured files may have been exposed. Malone meets agent Durant, who works for Stephanie, but he is killed before he can learn more. Malone follows the killer and eventually rescues Gary after killing his inept captors. What he apparently does not realize is that that was the plan by Sabre, who had anticipated this from the start. He delivers this message to his employer, the mysterious Blue Chair, the head of "The Chairs", according to whom they have different interests in the Alexandria Link; while Sabre wants the link, the Chairs want it to be obliterated. Later Thorvaldsen reveals to Stephanie the whereabouts of "The Chairs" and that it is a recreation of the Order of the Golden Fleece) - a European economic cartel. The head of this circle is called the Blue Chair, currently Alfred Hermann, an Austrian industrialist. This circle has many controls over Europe and their highest priority is the Middle East.

Malone is on his way with Pam to meet Haddad. He keeps Gary at Thorvaldsen's mansion, hoping that will keep him safe. He goes to London with Pam and meets Haddad to learn more about the Library of Alexandria and the mystery. Haddad tells them about the probable translation inaccuracies of the Old Testament and how he is working to show how it has been translated from Old Hebrew. But before he finishes explaining everything to Malone, Israeli agents arrive and kill Haddad.

Stephanie meets Heather Dixon, an Israeli citizen attached to the Washington mission, who tries to kill her. Cassiopeia Vitt, Thorvaldsen's associate, appears and tranquilizes her with a dart. Brent Green helps her to learn a lot about the current situation and reveals that Pam Malone might be the conduit of Israel. Sabre meets Malone and Pam and tries to buy some information from them in exchange for decoding a word-play of Haddad. Henrik flies to Austria with Gary to attend the Order of the Golden Fleece's meeting, thus playing a psychological game with Hermann.

As Henrik tries to glean information from Hermann about his plans at the meeting in Vienna, and Stephanie and Cassiopeia discover corruption and treason leading all the way to the vice president, Malone and Pam, with Sabre, fly to Lisbon to solve more of the quest Haddad left. The Israelis show up and try to kill them, and Malone realizes that they were tracking them through Pam's watch, unbeknownst to her. The next step leads them to the Sinai Desert in Egypt. Stephanie and Cassiopeia are recruited by President Danny Daniels to find out who is assisting the vice president and Alfred Hermann in plotting to kill him. They realize that Brent Green is the traitor after Larry Daley is killed by a car bomb, and they set up a plan to take him down.

Malone, Pam, and Sabre arrive in the Sinai and follow the path to a "monastery" run by Guardians, who guard the library. Sabre, who wants a seat in the Order, kidnaps a Guardian to take control of the library and use it to bargain with Hermann. Malone and Pam chase him into the library, where they learn Haddad is the Librarian and that his "death" was fake. Sabre shoots Haddad for real this time, and Pam shoots Sabre before he can kill Malone. Brent Green is killed by Heather Dixon before he can kill Stephanie, and the president reveals that he knows everything to the vice president and Hermann. The Malones return to Copenhagen before Pam and Gary fly home to Atlanta.

== Editions ==
- ISBN 978-0-345-49724-6 (paperback) (2007)

== Response ==
Many readers accused Berry of intentionally infusing the book with antisemitism or anti-zionism, including author Orson Scott Card.

Preceded by The Templar Legacy	Steve Berry novels 2007	Succeeded by The Venetian Betrayal
