= The Amber Room (novel) =

2003 novel by Steve Berry

- First edition (US)
- Author: Steve Berry
- Language: English
- Genre: Thriller, crime, mystery
- Publisher: Ballantine Books (US); Hodder & Stoughton (UK)
- Publication date: 2003
- Publication place: United States
- Media type: Print (hardback & paperback)
- Pages: 390
- ISBN: 0-345-46003-0
- OCLC: 52208475
- Dewey Decimal: 813/.6 21
- LC Class: PS3602.E764 A83 2003
- Followed by: The Romanov Prophecy

The Amber Room is American author Steve Berry's debut novel. The book is set around the mystery behind the Amber Room's disappearance at the end of World War II (a treasure stolen by Nazis in 1941 from the Catherine Palace in Tsarskoe Selo, Russia, it subsequently disappeared in 1945, amidst the chaos at the end of the war).

It was published in 2003, and has since been followed up by The Romanov Prophecy, in 2004.

== Plot summary ==
The story is about judge Rachel Cutler and her husband Paul, a divorced American couple caught up in a treasure hunt for the long-missing Amber Room. A couple of competitive professional treasure hunters complicate matters. In their search through Germany to uncover the secrets behind its disappearance, they escape near-death in the tunnels running through the Harz Mountains, find themselves hanging off the edge of a tall church steeple, and discover a surprise in a hidden chamber of a Bohemian castle in the Czech Republic.

== Reception ==
Within 3 weeks of publishing the book had made it on to The New York Times Best Seller list, hitting number 24 on that list by mid-September 2003.

== Release details ==
- 2003, USA, Ballantine, Westminster (ISBN 0-345-46003-0), 2003, hardback (First edition)
