= Dinsman =

Yang Berbahagia Datuk Dinsman PMW
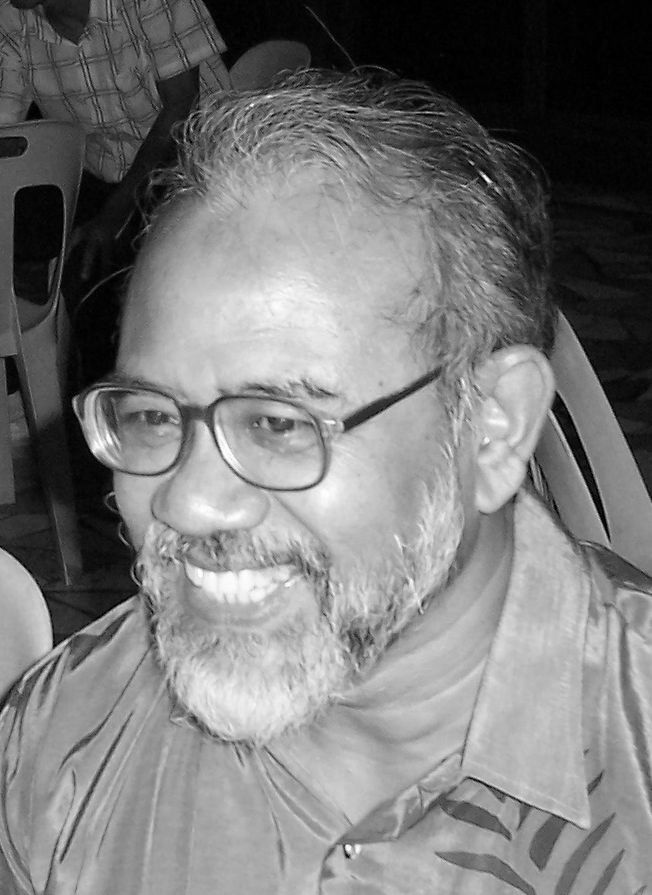
- Dinsman. University of Malaya, 29.4.2009
- Born: Che Shamsudin Osman; May 20, 1949 (age 77); Kampung Raja, Jitra, Kedah, Malaysia
- Citizenship: Malaysia
- Education: University of Malaya
- Occupations: poet, dramatist, theatre practitioner
- Writing career
- Pen name: Dinsman
- Language: Malay
- Notable awards: Malaysia Premier's Literary Award (1976, 1983)
- Literary movement: "Artists with the People" (Paksi)

Dinsman (May 20, 1949, Kampung Raja, Jitra, Kedah) is a Malaysian poet, playwright and theatre practitioner. Dinsman is his penname, his real name being Che Shamsudin Osman.

== Brief biography ==
He received his secondary education at a Muslim school in Alor Setar and a Muslim college in Petaling Jaya (1969-1970). In 1974 he graduated from University of Malaya. In the years 1974-1979 worked at the Dewan Bahasa dan Pustaka Library. Later he organized the theater group "Teater Elit" (1979) and initiated the creation of the popular vocal trio Kopratasa. In 2008, he founded the organization "Artists with the People" (Paksi), which since January 2015 holds every month poetry evenings in one of the madrasah of Kuala Lumpur.

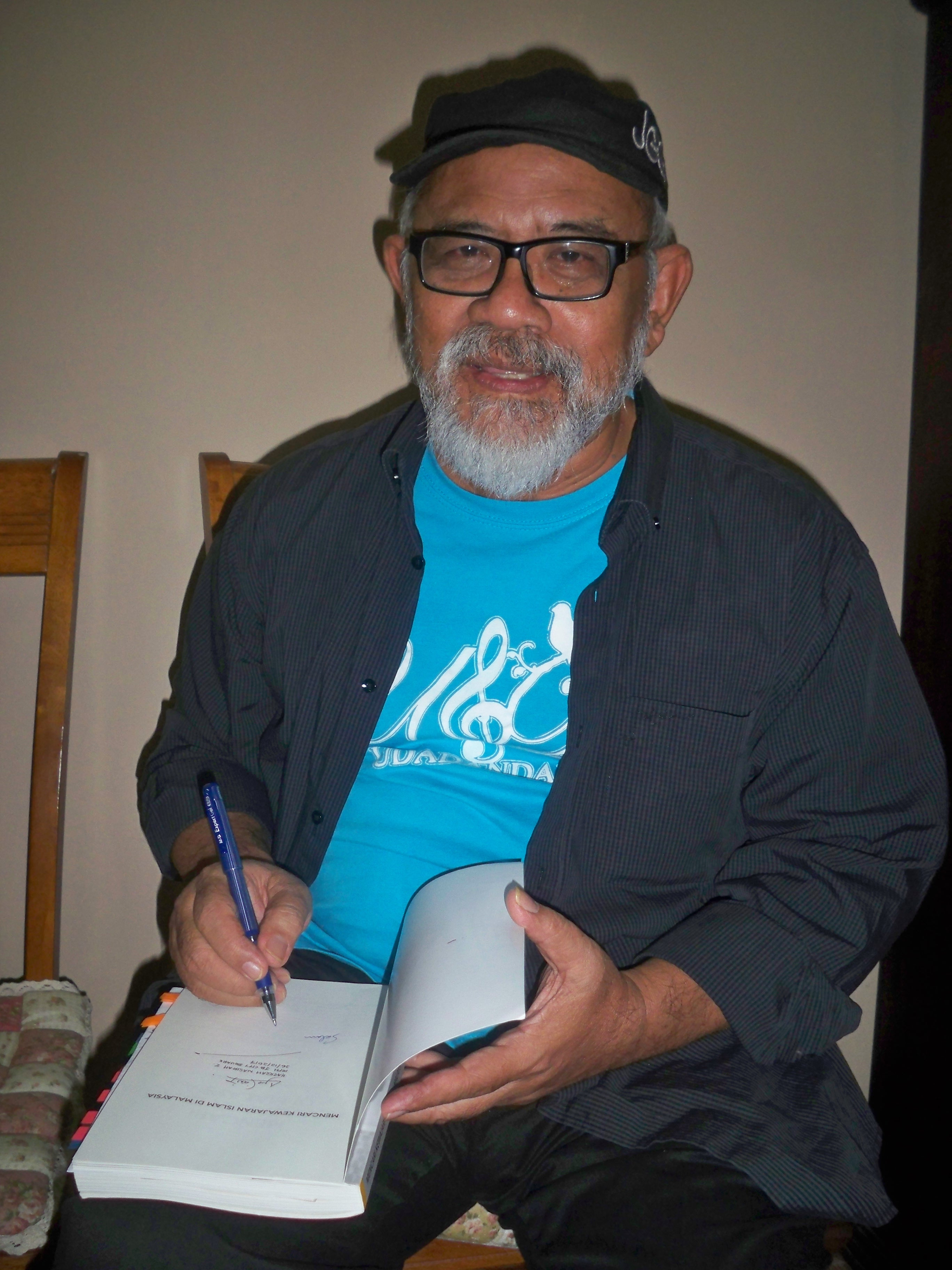
Dinsman signs his book "To Look for Islamic Fairness in Malaysia", 31.1.2018

== Creativity ==
He wrote several plays: "Jebat" (1973), "Protes" (“Protest”, 1972), "Bukan Bunuh Diri" (“Not suicide” 1974), Ana (1976), "Di Pulau Sadandi" (“On the Island of Sadandi” 1977), "Project Izie" (1982), "Siapakah Takutkan Amerika?” ( Who's Afraid of America?, 1996), "Nabi Yusuf" (2005, The Prophet Yusuf), “Tamu dari Medan Perang”(“The Guests from the War Field” 2006), "Apokalipso " (“The Apocalypse”, 2008) "Menunggu Kata dari Tuhan" (Waiting for the Word of God, 2009). Almost all of them are absurdist in nature, undoubtedly influenced by the Western playwrights, in particular Ionesco. His credo is: "The more viewers do not understand the content of the play, the more successful it is". His poetry is mostly of a protest and satirical nature. In the 21st century he staged two innovative performances: theatre atop the tree (2016, on the basis of Usman Awang’s poetry) and theatre on the paddy field (2017, on the basis of Usman Awang’s play “Uda dan Dara”). He writes also publicist books such as “Mencari Kewajaran Islam di Malaysia” (To Look for Islamic Fairness in Malaysia, 2017)

== Awards ==
- Winner of the Competition for the Best Play of the Ministry of Culture, Youth and Sports ("Jebat") (1973)
- Winner of the National Competition for the Best Play of the Ministry of Culture, Youth and Sports ("Protest") (1974)
- Malaysia Premier's Literary Award ("Ana") (1976)
- Malaysia Premier's Literary Award ("A Long poem for Mahathir Mohamad") (1983)
- The title of Honorary Scientist at the Northern University of Malaysia (2008)
