= Bucay =

Bucay may refer to:

- Bucay, Ecuador, a town in Ecuador
- Bucay, Abra, a municipality in the Philippines
- Jorge Bucay, an Argentinian writer
