= The Moses Expedition =

Novel by Juan Gómez-Jurado

- First U.S. edition cover
- Author: Juan Gómez-Jurado
- Original title: Contrato con Dios
- Translator: A. V. Lebron
- Cover artist: Katuxa Otero
- Language: Spanish
- Genre: Thriller/Mystery/Adventure
- Publisher: Atria (a Simon & Schuster imprint)
- Publication date: 2007
- Publication place: Spain
- Media type: Print (Hardback)
- Pages: 388pp
- ISBN: 1-4165-9064-1
- Preceded by: God's Spy
- Followed by: The Traitor's Emblem

The Moses Expedition (Contrato con Dios in Spanish) is a bestselling thriller novel by Juan Gómez-Jurado originally published in Spain in 2007 and in the UK in 2010 by Orion with the title Contract with God. The book topped the bestselling list in Europe and some of the American lists such as Amazon's, having sold 1.5 million copies. It also won awards such as the "Best Popular Culture Novel" and "Best Adventure Novel" in the 2011 International Latino Book Awards, held in New York City.

The novel, set in the modern-day Middle East as well as in Washington, D.C. and New York City, follows the story of an expedition to recover the Ark of the Covenant while it unfolds the story of a young boy running away from the SS in Nazi's occupied Austria. It concerns such themes as Islamic terrorism, the Holocaust and the conflict between faith and reason.

== Characters ==
- Andrea Otero – The leading character, a journalist.
- Father Anthony Fowler – A mysterious priest.
- Raymond Kayn – A reclusive billionaire.
- Orville Watson – An Internet security expert.
- Cecyl Forrester – A Texan archeologist.
- Moggens Dekker – A South African military contractor.

There are also a number of minor, real life characters, e.g. Heinrich Gross and others. The novel it also depicts the Am Spiegelgrund clinic, a center for child euthanasia in Nazi Germany, which was part of Hitler's Final Solution.

== Reaction ==
Gómez-Jurado was already a household name in Europe but not yet in the United States. A group of New York Times bestselling authors such as Brad Thor, Matthew Pearl, Javier Sierra, Stephen Coonts, Steve Berry and Katherine Neville among others showed their enthusiasm The Moses Expedition. Booklist praised it as a "A perfectly balanced, fast-paced, and compelling thriller. Already an international bestseller, it's also likely to draw the American crowd".
