= The Charlemagne Pursuit =

2008 novel by Steve Berry

- Author: Steve Berry
- Cover artist: Carole Lowenstein
- Language: English
- Series: Cotton Malone
- Genre: Thriller, spy fiction
- Publisher: Ballantine Books
- Publication date: 2008
- Publication place: United States
- Media type: Hardcover
- Pages: 509 pg, 25 cm. (1st Release)
- ISBN: 978-0-345-48579-3
- OCLC: 216937382
- Dewey Decimal: 813/.6 22
- LC Class: PS3602.E764 C47 2008
- Preceded by: The Venetian Betrayal
- Followed by: The Paris Vendetta

The Charlemagne Pursuit is Steve Berry's seventh novel, and is the fourth adventure for the former U.S. Justice Department operative turned antiquarian book dealer, Cotton Malone. It was published on December 9, 2008.

== Synopsis ==
The story follows Malone in his attempt to find details of his father's death. His father, Forrest Malone, was a US Navy officer who disappeared while on a mission on an experimental submarine in 1971. Also investigating the submarine's fate are the German twins, Cristl Falk and Dorothea Lindauer, whose father was on the same submarine.

The search is complicated by Admiral Langford Ramsey, who attempts to hide his involvement with a second submarine that was sent to find Forest Malone and his crew. Stephanie Nelle, Malone's ex-boss, and Edwin Davis, the (Deputy National Security Advisor), become involved while searching for Charlie Smith, a killer hired by Ramsey to eradicate any links to him.
