= Die boek van spoke =

Die Boek van Spoke (Lit. The Book of Ghosts) is an anthology of ghost stories that was compiled and translated into Afrikaans by South African author François Bloemhof.

It was published by Tiara Uitgewers in 2004 exclusively through Leserskring (Leisure Books).

== Stories ==
Die Boek van Spoke contains the following stories, including one contribution by the editor:

Die Aapklou - W. W. Jacobs

Op Pad - Richard Middleton

Die Storm - Jules Verne

In Die Donker Gang Af - Francois Bloemhof

'n Legende van Stilvallei - Washington Irving

Sneeu - Hugh Walpole

Op die Rivier - Guy de Maupassant

Die Rooi Kamer - H. G. Wells

Huis van die Regter - Bram Stoker

Die Skaduwee van die Skyndood - C.J. Langenhoven

Einde van 'n Spookstorie - I.A. Ireland

Maansteen en Ametis - Johnita le Roux

Die Wolwe van Sernogratz - Saki

Die Dooie Meisie - Guy de Maupassant

Stemme - Jaco Jacobs

Die Lykdief - Robert Louis Stevenson

Hoe Professor Guildea Liefde Gevind Het - Robert Hichens
