= Contract with God =

Contract with God may refer to:

- Covenant (religion), a formal alliance or agreement made by God with a religious community or with humanity in general
- A Contract with God, a 1978 graphic novel by Will Eisner
- The Moses Expedition (Contrato con Dios in Spanish or Contract with God in British English), a 2007 novel by Juan Gómez-Jurado
