= Alba Bouwer Prize =

Prize for outstanding children's literature in Afrikaans

- Afrikaans: Alba Bouwerprys vir Kinderliteratuur
- Awarded for: outstanding children's literature in Afrikaans
- Sponsored by: South African Academy of Science and Arts
- Country: South Africa

The Alba Bouwer Prize (Afrikaans: Alba Bouwerprys vir Kinderliteratuur) is a prize for outstanding children's literature in Afrikaans, awarded triennially by the South African Academy of Science and Arts. Works qualifying for the prize should have been published within the preceding three years, and be intended for under-12s. The prize is named in honour of children's author Alba Bouwer (1920–2010), herself a three-time winner of the Academy's Scheepers Prize for youth literature, instituted in 1956.

== Recipients ==
Alba Bouwer Prize recipients
Year	Author	Title
1989	Freda Linde	Strepie en Kurfie (1987)
1992	Barrie Hough	Droomwa (1990)
1992	Marietjie de Jongh	Braam en die engel (1991)
1995	Corlia Fourie	Die towersak en ander stories (1994)
1995	Corlia Fourie	Die wit vlinder (1993)
1998	Philip de Vos	Moenie 'n mielie kielie nie (1995)
2001	Martie Preller	Die Balkie-boek (2000)
2004	Leon de Villiers	Droomoog Diepgrawer (2003)
2007	Jaco Jacobs	Wurms met tamatiesous en ander lawwe rympies (2005)
2010	Linda Rode	In die Nimmer-Immer-bos (2009)
2013	Elizabeth Wasserman	Anna Atoom-reeks (2012)
2016	Kobus Geldenhuys	Hoekom die walvisse gekom het (a translation of Why the Whales Came by Michael Morpurgo)
2019	Jaco Jacobs	Moenie hierdie boek eet nie! (2016)
2022	Jaco Jacobs	Die boekwinkel tussen die wolke
