= Wilhelm Otto Kühne =

South African writer (1924–1988)

Wilhelm Otto (W.O) Kühne (1924–1988) award-winning author of children's literature and editor of Die Jongspan and Die Burger in Cape Town, South Africa. One of the foremost children's authors in the Afrikaans language, the most notable of his books are the Huppelkind series and Die wonderbaarlike motor van Barnabas Bombas (1981). Kühne won the inaugural C. P. Hoogenhout Award for Afrikaans children's literature for his book Huppel verjaar. His wife, the illustrator Dorothy Hill, illustrated the entire Huppelkind series along with many of his other books. An interview with his wife and collaborator Dorothy Hill in 2018, 50 years after the first edition of the Huppelkind book, gave more details on their work together.

== Early life ==
Wilhelm Otto (W.O.) Kühne was born near Graaff-Reinet in 1924. He taught at Vredehoek Primary School in Cape Town before joining the editorial staff of Die Burger where he worked, among other things, as a yachting reporter. He subsequently wrote for Die Huisgenoot and Sarie Marais magazines and was the editor of Die Jongspan. He had a popular daily column in Die Burger called Van Alle Kante.

== Career ==
W.O. Kühne is best known for his Huppelkind stories. They were first published as stories in Klein Burger and were published as six separate Huppelkind books by Tafelberg from 1958 to 1960. The six classic stories have recently been brought together in an anthology celebrating the 50 year anniversary of the first edition printed in 1958. Huppel's appeal has been likened to that of Christopher Robin in English children's literature and the play on rhythm, words and sounds in Kühne's prose is at times strongly reminiscent of that of Dr Seuss. Dorothy Hill's charming illustrations complement the text.

In 1960 W.O. Kühne was the first recipient of the C.P. Hoogenhout award for Huppel verjaar. He wrote a number of other children's and youth books such as Kassie Krog in die knyp (1960), Die Kringe van Keerom (1962) and Die Wonderlike motor van Barnabas Bombas (1981).

Die Kringe van Keerom (1962) was co-winner along with Die Goue Protea by Mikro of the first prize in the Nasionale Boekhandel Youth Stories competition in 1961, written to commemorate the first Afrikaans book in 1861. It has gone through two editions and twelve reprints.

Kühne translated or retold a number of nursery stories such as Die flukse kabouters van Keulen (1969), My prentepoetseboek (1976), and four books in a series of Bible stories for children, namely The Birth of Jesus, Moses in the Basket, David and Goliath, and The Childhood of Jesus, all published in 1982.

== Death ==
W.O. Kühne died in 1988.

== Selected works ==
- Die nagvlieërs, Tafelberg (1957)
- Die indringers, Tafelberg (1958)
- Huppelkind, Tafelberg (1958)
- Huppel maak 'n plan, Tafelberg (1958)
- Wip-Huppel-Wip, Tafelberg (1959)
- Vrolike Huppelkind, Tafelberg (1959)
- Huppel by die water, Tafelberg (1960)
- Huppel verjaar, Tafelberg (1960)
- Huppel en sy maats (anthology, 1982, ISBN 0-624-01706-0, ISBN 0-624-03431-3)
- Kassie Krog in die knyp, Tafelberg (1960)
- Die wonderbaarlike motor van Barnabas Bombas, Nasionale Boekhandel (1981)
- Die mededingers, Tafelberg (1962)
- Die kring van Keerom, Tafelberg (1962)
- Hoera vir Klaas Jas!, Tafelberg (1975)
- Piet-’n-Jan, Tafelberg (1975)
- Die waterskeiding, Tafelberg (1981)
- Die vloedramp, Tafelberg (1981)
- Pot, graaf en houtvurk, Tafelberg (1983)
- Die wonderbaarlike wedervaringe van Jurie Losper en Broer Herklaas, Tafelberg (1984)
- Pip in Otterland, Tafelberg (1983)
- Eendag was daar ’n witborskraai: ’n fantasieverhaal, Tafelberg (1985)
- Huppelkind anthology, Tafelberg (2018) ISBN 9780624085485

== Awards ==
- C.P. Hoogenhout Award (1960) – Huppel verjaar
- Nasionale Boekhandel Youth Story Competition (1961) – Die kring van Keerom
