= The Secret Supper =

Novel by Javier Sierra

The Secret Supper is a thriller novel written by Javier Sierra. The original Spanish title is La Cena Secreta, winner of the 2004 Premio de Novela Ciudad de Torrevieja literary award, one of the richest literary prizes in the world. The English translation by Alberto Manguel was published in 2006.

== Plot summary ==
It is set while Leonardo da Vinci is painting The Last Supper. The story is told in Agostino Leyre's words, as mysterious letters come in to Rome. He is a chief inquisitor, and so he decides to investigate who had sent these mysterious letters, hinting at heresy. He goes to Santa Maria delle Grazie, where he meets various monks, priests and nuns. But while he is there, various suspicious deaths and rumours takes him into a search for truth- the meaning of The Last Supper. Intrigued, he finds yet another mystery - a blue leather-bound book, portrayed in tarot cards left by the killer of several pilgrims, known as 'The Soothsayer'.

== Main characters ==
- Agostino Leyre- Chief Inquisitor at Rome, called to investigate The Soothsayer
- Beatrice d'Este- Duchess, died along with her newborn baby
- Leonardo da Vinci- Artist, inventor and author, painter of the Last Supper and Maesta
- Father Alessandro- Librarian who helps Agostino with his search
- Brother Benedetto- A one-eyed monk who is not what he seems...
- Brother Guglielmo- The cook at Santa Maria
- Brother Giberto- A red-haired monk
- Father Prior- tries to decipher the identity of the Soothsayer along with Agostino
- Bernardino Luini- One of Leonardo's ex-apprentices who starts his own hunt for answers
- Marco Forzetta- Another one of Leonardo's ex-apprentices

== See also ==
- Cultural references to Leonardo da Vinci
