= Rona Rupert =

South African writer (1934–1995)

Rona Rupert née Davel (7 February 1934 – 25 August 1995) was a South African author. In 1976, she received the C.P. Hoogenhout Award.

== In Afrikaans ==
Born in Calvinia, South Africa. Her father was a lecturer of Afrikaans and Dutch, before the family moved to Calvinia and bought Doega farm.

Rona studied Afrikaans and music at Stellenbosch University and obtained a BA degree in 1953, a Secondary Teacher's Diploma in 1954 and a Performer's Licentiate (Piano). She also studied music for one year in Amsterdam. Rona gave music, recorder and piano lessons for many years.

After their marriage Rona and Koos Rupert moved to Stellenbosch, where they lived in Thibault Street. They had a daughter, Marian. Rona and Koos were co-founders of the Karoo Boekehuis in Calvinia, where authors can stay and work in peace.

She was the author of 33 Afrikaans books for children and young people.
