= Corlia Fourie =

Afrikaans writer

Cornelia Hilda Kühn
- Born: 11 December 1944 (age 81)
- Occupation: Writer
- Writing career
- Pen name: Corlia Fourie

Cornelia Hilda Kühn (born 11 December 1944) is an Afrikaans writer known under the pen-name Corlia Fourie. She won the ATKV-prize for the short story anthology Liefde en geweld and the MER prize for Die towersak en ander stories. In 1995, she received the Alba Bouwer Prize.

== Biography ==
She is the daughter of the writer Mikro (C H Kühn). She writes drama, children's books, short stories and novels. Her drama Moeders en dogters was adapted for television and radio and also presented by Kruik.

== Books ==
- Marianne en die leeu in die pophuis, 1982
- Moeders en dogters, 1985/92
- Leuens, 1986
- En die son skyn in Suid-Afrika, 1986
- Die volstruisie wat graag wou vlieg, 1986
- Die meisie wat soos 'n bottervoël sing
- Tintinyane, the girl who sang like a magic bird, 1990
- Jakkalsstreke, 1991
- Liefde en geweld (kortstories), Tafelberg, 1992
- Ganekwane en die groen draak, 1992
- Vrou-mens, Verhale deur vroue oor vroue (kompilasie), 1993
- Die deurmekaardier, 1993
- Sê (kortstories), 1994
- Die towersak, 1995
- Die oop deur, 1996
- Nolito en die wonderwater, 1997
- Die wit vlinder, Tafelberg, 1993
- Want die lewe is goed – keur uit die werk van Mikro, Lapa, 2003
- Ware liefde: bekende Suid-Afrikaanse paartjiesWare liefde: bekende Suid-Afrikaanse paartjies, Human & Rousseau, 2008
- Heleen en die heks met die hoofpyn, Protea Boekhuis, 2008
- Alle paaie lei deur die strand, LAPA 2008
- Die geheime kamer, LAPA 2012
- Harry Potter and the Philosophers Stone, Tafelberg, 1998
- 3am Thoughts, a collection of poems, short stories and smut, Penguin Books, 2021
