= Marisol Ceh Moo =

Mexican Maya writer and professor (born 1968)

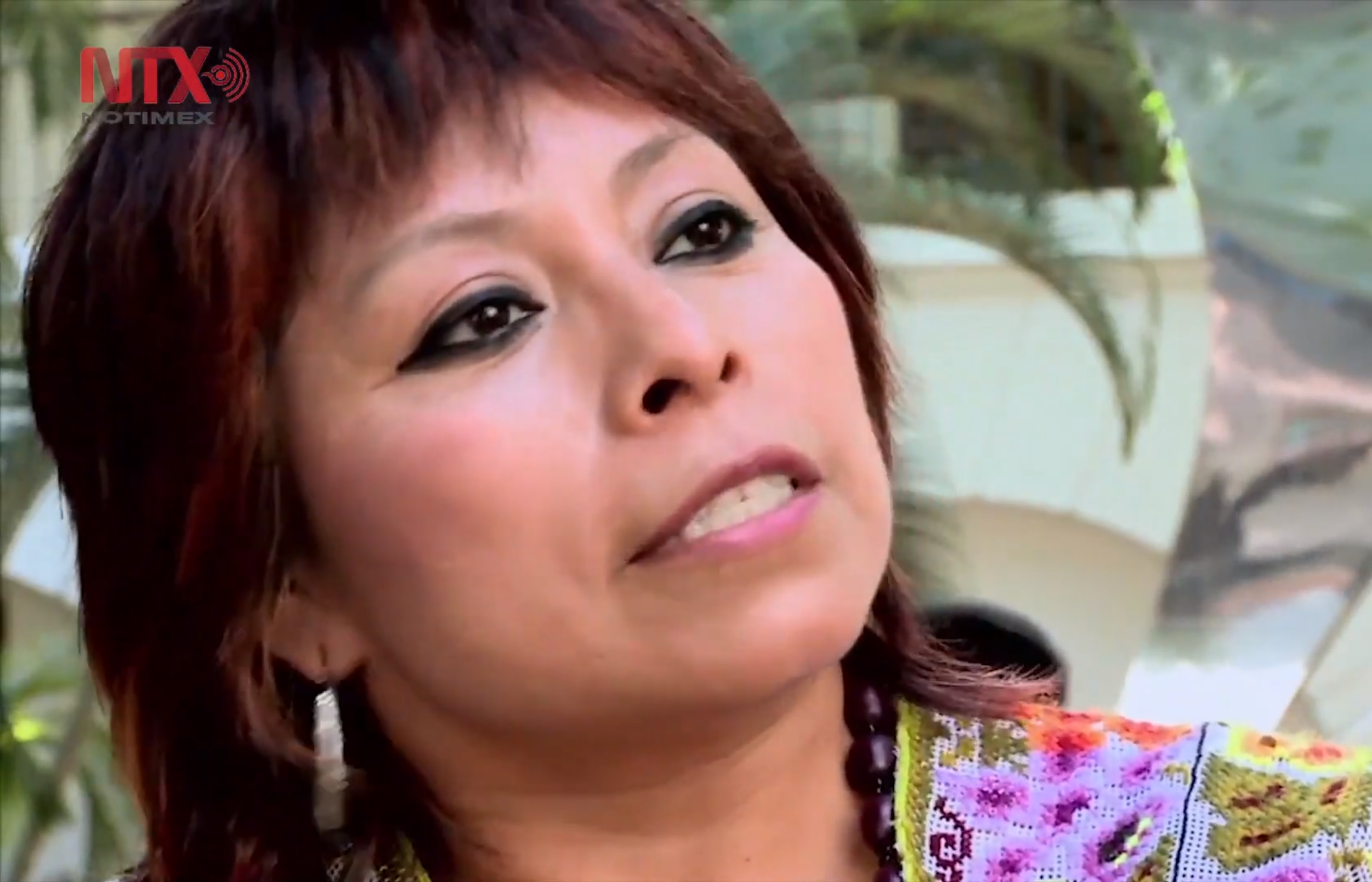
- Marisol Ceh Moo on Notimex TV in 2019
- Born: May 12, 1968 (age 57) Calotmul Municipality, Yucatán Mexico
- Occupation: Novelist; translator
- Language: Yucatec Maya, Spanish
- Period: 2008-present

Marisol Ceh Moo (Mayan pronunciation: [maɾiˈsol kéːh moʔ]; also Sol Ceh, born May 12, 1968) is a Mexican Maya writer and professor. She writes in Yucatec and in Spanish, and is known for her efforts to revitalize and protect the Yucatec Maya language. Her novel, X-Teya, u puksi 'ik'al ko'olel (Teya, the Heart of a Woman 2008), is the first written by a woman in the Yucatec language.

== Biography ==
Ceh Moo was born in Calotmul Municipality on May 12, 1968. Ceh Moo earned a degree in education from Universidad Autónoma de Yucatán and a degree in law from the Universidad Aliat.

In 2007 and 2009, Ceh Moo won the Alfredo Barrera Vázquez award. Ceh Moo became the second woman to win the Nezahualcóyotl Award in 2014. In 2019 Ceh Moo became the first woman to win the Latin American Indigenous Literature Award.

== Writing ==
She made her debut with X-Teya, u puksi'ik'al ko'olel (Teya, A Woman's Heart), the first modern novel published in the Maya language. The story is a political and realistic narrative. Ceh Moo broke with prior tradition of Mayan language publishing, which typically only includes short stories, myths, and poems that deal with themes relating to Mayan culture, by publishing the novel, which tells the story of a communist militant woman murdered in 1970s Yucatán. Ceh Moo uses tropes and literature types that she borrows from the Spanish and uses them in her native language. Ceh Moo was worried at first about breaking Mayan traditions in literature, but eventually chose to use new words and explore themes that were important to her.

She has since published several other novels and translates between Spanish and Maya. Her 2014 novel Chen tumeen x ch'úupen won that year's Nezahualcóyotl Prize for Literature in Mexican Languages.

Ceh Moo is working on a series of books in the Yucatec language. The series was started after she was chosen to take part in the Sistema Nacional de Creadores de Arte, which awards a scholarship to recipients.

== Publications ==
- X-Teya, u puksi'ik'al koolel. in Spanish and Yukatek. Conaculta. 2008. ISBN 978-970-35-0959-1.
- Sujuy K'iin (2011)
- T'ambilak men tunk'ulilo'ob. in Spanish and Yukatek. Consejo Nacional para la Cultura y las Artes, Dirección General de Culturas Populares. 2011. ISBN 978-607-455-665-0.
- Tabita y otros cuentos mayas. in Spanish and Yukatek. Mérida, Yucatán: Maldonado Editores del Mayab. 2013. OCLC 953032814.
- Kaaltale', ku xijkunsik u jel puksi'ik'alo'ob. in Spanish and Yukatek. Mérida, Yucatán: Secretaría de la Cultura y las Artes de Yucatán. 2013. ISBN 978-607-8267-30-9.
- Chen tumeen x ch'úupen [Only for being a woman]. in Spanish and Yukatek. Mexico City: CONACULTA. 2015. ISBN 978-607-745-305-5.
