= The Traitor's Emblem =

2011 novel by Juan Gómez-Jurado

- First edition
- Author: Juan Gómez-Jurado
- Original title: El emblema del traidor
- Translator: Daniel Hahn
- Cover artist: Alejandro Colucci
- Language: Spanish
- Genre: Thriller/Mystery
- Publisher: Plaza & Janés (Spanish); Atria (a Simon & Schuster imprint)
- Publication date: 2008
- Publication place: Spain
- Media type: Print (Hardback)
- Pages: 368pp
- ISBN: 978-1-4391-9878-0
- Preceded by: The Moses Expedition

The Traitor's Emblem (El emblema del traidor in Spanish) is a bestselling thriller novel by Juan Gómez-Jurado originally published in Spain in 2008, with the English version published in 2011. It has become an instant bestseller throughout Europe with more than a million copies sold to date, topping the bestsellers list for weeks, and is being translated into a further 45 languages. The plot is set in Munich, during the Interwar period. Led by a German orphan looking for the truth after his father death and a Jewish-American photographer, it is inspired by a true story related to the Holocaust and the rise of Nazism. Several historical personalities appear on the novel as secondary characters. The Traitor's Emblem won the prestigious Premio de Novela Ciudad de Torrevieja, being Juan Gómez-Jurado the youngest author in History in receiving this award.

== Plot summary ==
The Straits of Gibraltar, 1940. In the heart of a storm at sea, Spanish captain González rescues a group of German castaways. When the torrent subsides, the leader of the survivors gratefully offers the captain a strange-looking emblem made of gold and diamonds, in exchange for safe passage to the coast of Portugal instead of Spain. Decades later, in 2009, the son of captain González receives a substantial offer for the emblem. He does not sell it, but the would-be buyer reveals an astounding story behind that mysterious object: it holds the key to Paul Reiner’s lifelong quest...

Munich, 1919. After his family falls into disgrace, 15-year-old Paul Reiner and his mother work as servants in the mansion of Baron von Schroeder, whose wife is Paul’s mother’s own sister. Unhappy and full of despair, Paul dreams of the heroic father he never knew. His mother speaks very little of him, and the von Schroeders revile his memory. To make matters worse, Paul’s cousin Jürgen hounds him at every turn, making his life almost unbearable. But one night, Paul accidentally learns that his father didn't die before the First World War commanding a ship in the German colonies, as he had always been told. He was killed by someone very close to him, and for unclear reasons. This discovery turns Paul's world upside down and from that moment, Paul sacrifices everything to discover the truth behind his father's death. His quest for the truth brings him into contact with Alys Tannenbaum, a Jewish-American photographer, with whom he feels an immediate connection. But Germany during the early 20th century is fraught with danger and racism, and Paul and Alys’s love is constantly tested.

== Characters in The Traitor's Emblem ==
- Paul Reiner — The leading character, an orphan looking for the identity of his father's murderer.
- Alys Tanenbaum— A Jewish-American photographer.
- Jurgen Von Schroeder — Paul's cousin, an S.S. Officer.

There is also a number of secondary real life characters, e.g. Adolf Hitler, Reinhard Heydrich, Adolf Eichmann and many others. The novel also depicts the early days of Dachau concentration camp.

== The real-life story behind the novel ==
The Traitor's Emblem it is inspired by a real-life story that Gómez-Jurado heard first-hand from a bookseller named Juan Carlos González. Gómez-Jurado told González the rough plot of a novel he was researching at the time, but González told Gómez-Jurado “Do you want me to tell you a story that really deserves to be turned into a novel?”. The novelist accepted.

In Juan Gómez-Jurado’s own words: “Juan Carlos González told me the story of how the patrol boat on which his father had served had saved four mysterious Germans from drowning in the Straits of Gibraltar, and how one of them paid him back with a gold emblem before vanishing in the night. He never knew who they were or where they came from."

González actually showed him the emblem. Intrigued, Gómez-Jurado began a journey of research that took him across four countries and led him to discover that it was a Masonic emblem worth $1 million that Hitler had made to reward a high-level Nazi who infiltrated the Freemasons. Gomez-Jurado believed that "the story behind this mysterious emblem was so astounding that it deserved to be a central point in my next novel".

== Critical reception and awards ==
In the USA, Kirkus Reviews praised the book as a "Riveting, redeeming love story [...] with a villain so evil he makes Hitler look like a pretty nice fellow"

The Traitor's Emblem won the prestigious Premio de Novela Ciudad de Torrevieja. Financially, it is one of the most valuable literary prizes in the world, with the winner receiving more than $500,000. Gómez-Jurado is the youngest author in receiving this award. Said the president of the jury, “When we the members of the jury met to vote the winner of the award, there were no surprises. We unanimously acclaimed The Traitor's Emblem. The real surprise came when we broke the sealed envelope that kept the name of the author, and we discovered that such a complex, brilliant and dark story was written by a 30-year-old man.”
