= Premio de Novela Ciudad de Torrevieja =

The Premio de Novela Ciudad de Torrevieja was a Spanish literary prize, awarded since 2001 by the publisher Plaza & Janés (subsidiary of Random House) to an original unpublished novel written in Spanish (Castilian). It was created in 2001 by Ayuntamiento de Torrevieja (City Government of Torrevieja) and the Spanish publisher Plaza & Janés, intended to bring local and international prestige to the seaside town from where it takes its name.

== History ==
Financially, it was among the top most valuable literary prizes in the world, with the winner receiving €360,607 (more than $500,000 as of September 2011). From 2004-2009 there was a runner up who was awarded €125,000; since 2009 there was no secondary prize. The prize was awarded each year, usually in September, on a date set by the award's jury. The jury was always composed of Plaza & Janés' chief editor, Nuria Tey; the Mayor of the City of Torrevieja and a panel of writers and critics that change every year. Initially, the prize was going to be awarded every two years, but in 2003 it was changed to every year for a new, unpublished novel.

As most literary awards in Spain, the Premio de Novela Ciudad de Torrevieja was open to all Spanish-speaking authors in the world. The majority of competing manuscripts came mainly from Spain and Latin America, specifically Argentina, Mexico, Chile and Colombia. The readership of the prize was that of bestselling thrillers, crime/detective, mystery and even political fiction, and much of the marketing and promotion was jointly channeled through Spain's main retail store chain, El Corte Inglés.

On October 2, 2009 the award was given for the first time to a novel written by two authors among more than 440 contesting novels from Spain, Latin America, Europe and the United States.

== List of winners ==
Winners listed first, followed by runners up (only for 2004-2009).

- 2011: Jordi Sierra i Fabra, Sombras en el tiempo
- 2010: Gustavo Martín Garzo, Tan cerca del aire
- 2009: Àlex Rovira & Francesc Miralles, La Última Respuesta
  - Andrés Pascual, El guardián de la flor de loto
- 2008: Juan Gómez-Jurado, El Emblema del Traidor (The Traitor's Emblem)
  - Alejandro Palomas, El Secreto de los Hoffman
- 2007: José Carlos Somoza, La Llave del Abismo
  - Juan Cobos Wilkins, El Mar Invisible
- 2006: Jorge Bucay, El Candidato
  - Ignacio García-Valiño, Querido Caín
- 2005: César Vidal, Los Hijos de la Luz
  - José Calvo Poyato, La Orden Negra
- 2004: Zoé Valdés, La Eternidad del Instante
  - Javier Sierra, La Cena Secreta (The Secret Supper)
- 2003: Juan José Armas Marcelo, Casi Todas las Mujeres
- 2002: (no award)
- 2001: Javier Reverte, La Noche Detenida

== See also ==
- List of literary awards
- Spanish literature
