= KONS International Literary Award =

KONS International Literary Award is a literary award given to poets and writers who write socially transformative literature and have dedicated their lives to improve social justice.

It was founded in 2011 at the personal initiative of three female poets from Slovenia: Taja Kramberger, Tatjana Jamnik and Barbara Korun, who are also its co-proprietors and permanent members of the literary jury.

The advisory and supporting members of the board come from multiple countries. The prize is awarded at the jury's discretion. The bestowal takes place at various locations across the world, where literary events are organized.

The award is partially a reply to a male-dominated literary world in the small state of Slovenia and a similar situation in the Central Europe. It is not given only to female authors, but to women and men who write socially sensitive, humanly and ethically coherent and transformative literature. It is also the recognition of poets’ and writers’ life struggles for social justice and of their investments in the collective good.

KONS International Literary Award was awarded for the first time on 2 April 2011 at Pavel's house (Pavlova hiša / Pavelhaus) in Potrna / Laafeld in Austria. It was received by Iztok Osojnik (born in 1951), a Slovenian poet, writer, translator, organizer, facilitator, etc. The second winner, given in February 2013 in Granada, is a renowned Nicaraguan-Salvadoran poet Claribel Alegría (born in 1924).

== See also ==
- List of literary awards
- List of poetry awards
