= C.P. Hoogenhout Award =

Afrikaans children's book award

- Sponsored by: SALI Trust
- Date: 1960; 65 years ago
- Country: South Africa
- Presented by: South African Library Association
- Reward(s): Gold medal

The C.P. Hoogenhout Award is awarded since 1960 to recognize the best original Afrikaans book for children between seven and twelve years of age. The South African Library Association instituted the prize for the best children's picture book. In earlier years the prize was awarded annually, but since 1982 it is awarded every two years. Since 2000 the awards have been sponsored by the SALI Trust. Previous winners are:

- 1960 - W.O. Kühne (Huppel verjaar)
- 1961 - Alba Bouwer (Katrientjie van Keerweder)
- 1962 - No award made
- 1963 - F. du Plessis (author) and Katrine Harries (illustrator) (Rympieboek vir kleuters)
- 1964 - Freda Linde (Snoet-alleen)
- 1965 - No award made
- 1966 - Günther Komnick (illustrator) (for Botter-aas written by Freda Linde)
- 1967 - Günther Komnick (illustrator) (for Die stadsmusikante written by Freda Linde)
- 1968 - Pieter W. Grobbelaar (author) and Katrine Harries (illustrator) (Die mooiste Afrikaanse sprokies)
- 1969 - No award made
- 1970 - No award made
- 1971 - Alba Bouwer ('n Hennetjie met kuikens)
- 1972 - No award made
- 1973 - Freda Linde (Jos en Klos)
- 1974 - Freda Linde (By die oog van die fontein)
- 1975 -No award made
- 1976 - Rona Rupert (Wat maak jy, Hektor?)
- 1977 - Freda Linde (Die kokkewiet en sy vrou)
- 1978 - No award made
- 1979 - Hester Heese (Sêra Madêra)
- 1980 - No award made
- 1980 - No award made
- 1981 - No award made
- 1982-1983 - Alba Bouwer (Vlieg, swaeltjie, vlieg)
- 1984-1985 - Tafelberg Uitgewers (Goue lint, my storie begint)
- 1986-1987 - No award made
- 1988-1989 - No award made
- 1990-1991 - Barrie Hough (Droomwa)
- 1992-1993 - No award made
- 1994-1995 - Martie Preller (Anderkantland)
- 1996-1997 - Janie Oosthuysen (Ouma Hester en die Dreadnought Merk III, Juffrou Luisenbosch en die breinwassers)
- 1998-1999 - Verna Vels (Liewe Heksie en die rekenaar)
- 2000-2001 - No award made
- 2002-2003 - No award made
- 2004-2005 - Leon de Villiers (Droomoog Diepgrawer)
- 2006-2007 - Jaco Jacobs (Wurms met tamatiesous en ander lawwe rympies)
