= Alba Bouwer =

- Born: 16 March 1920; Vredefort district, Free State, South Africa
- Died: 5 October 2010 (aged 90); Helderberg Village, Somerset West, Western Cape, South Africa
- Occupation: Journalist
- Spouse(s): Hubert Coetzee (d. 1969), Jan Hofmeyr
- Writing career
- Genre: Children's literature
- Subjects: girlhood; old age; rural life

Albertha Magdalena Bouwer (16 March 1920 – 5 October 2010) was a South African Afrikaans-writing journalist and author. She is best known for her series of children's stories about the experiences of a small girl called Alie growing up in the fictional location Rivierplaas in rural Free State. Late in life she published a novel for adults, Die afdraand van die dag is kil (The close of the day is cold, 1992), about two women in old age.

== Life ==
Alba Bouwer was herself brought up on a farm in the Free State, and attended La Rochelle Girls' High School in Paarl, and Huguenot University College in Wellington. Most of her professional life was spent in literary and media circles in and around Cape Town.

Immediately after graduation Bouwer began work as a school teacher, but she left teaching to become editor of Huishouding, a newly established women's magazine. From 1948 to 1950 she was a radio producer and presenter in the children's service of the South African Broadcasting Corporation, resigning in 1950 to take up an assistant editorship at the newly founded women's magazine Sarie, where she remained for thirteen years.

Her first and best known work of fiction, Stories van Rivierplaas, originally appeared in serialised form in Sarie. Like many of her stories, these were semi-autobiographical. She continued to produce stories, translations and compilations into the late 1980s, but gave up her career in journalism upon marriage in 1963.

Bouwer's first husband was Hubert Coetzee (died 1969), a widower with two teenaged children from his previous marriage. Care for her stepchildren became Bouwer's first priority as wife and as widow. In 1975 she remarried with Jan Hendrik Hofmeyr, a widower with five children from his previous marriage, and moved from the Boland to Riversdale.

== Death ==
Since 1994 she lived in a retirement resort in Somerset West. On 5 October 2010 Alba Bouwer fell into a coma and died.

== Awards and honours ==
Alba Bouwer was awarded the Scheepers Prize for Children's Literature in 1959 and again in 1965, and the C.P. Hoogenhout Award in 1961, 1971 and 1983.

Since 1989 the South African Academy of Science and Arts has presented a triennial Alba Bouwer Prize for children's literature, named in her honour.

== Publications ==
=== As author ===
- Stories van Rivierplaas. Cape Town: Nasionale Boekhandel, 1955. Illustrated by Katrine Harries
- Nuwe stories van Rivierplaas. Cape Town: Nasionale Boekhandel, 1956. Illustrated by Katrine Harries
- Abdoltjie: ses verhaaltjies oor 'n Maleiertjie van die ou Kaap. Cape Town: Nasionale Boekhandel, 1958. Illustrated by Katrine Harries
- "Die avonture van die eerste Afrikaanse vrou wat geneesheer geword het", a profile of Petronella van Heerden (1887–1975), the first Afrikaans woman to qualify as a doctor, published in parts in Sarie Marais, April–July 1960.
- Katrientjie van Keerweder. Cape Town: Tafelberg, 1961.
- Stories van Ruyswyck. Cape Town: Nasionale Boekhandel, 1963.
- Stories van Bergplaas. Cape Town: Tafelberg, 1963.
- 'n Hennetjie met kuikens. Cape Town: Tafelberg, 1971.
- Vlieg, swaeltjie, vlieg ver. Cape Town: Tafelberg, 1983.
- Die afdraand van die dag is kil. Cape Town: Tafelberg, 1992.
- Alba Bouwer-omnibus. Cape Town: Tafelberg, 1995. With the original illustrations by Katrine Harries.

Reissued 2007 under the title Rivierplaas: Stories van Rivierplaas, Nuwe Stories van Rivierplaas, Stories van Ruyswyck. ISBN 0-624-04531-5

=== As editor/compiler ===
- Kom nader: bloemlesing uit die werk van M.E.R. Compiled by Alba Bouwer et al. Cape Town, 1965.
- M.E.R., 'n Kosbare erfenis: briewe 1916–1975. Cape Town: Tafelberg, 1977. Collected letters of Marie Elisabeth Rothmann (1875–1975), compiled by Alba Bouwer, Anna Rothmann and Rykie van Reenen.

=== As translator ===
- Washington Irving, Rip van Winkel. Cape Town: Tafelberg, 1965. (From English). Illustrated by Katrine Harries
- Else Hueck-Dehio, Tippie se liefde. Cape Town: Tafelberg, 1966. (From German)
- Johann Wolfgang von Goethe, Die leerling-towenaar. 1968. (From German).
- A. A. Milne, Winnie-die-Poeh. Cape Town: Tafelberg, 1985. (From English)

Reissued 2007. ISBN 0-624-04533-1.
