= Juan Gómez-Jurado =

Spanish journalist and author (born 1977)

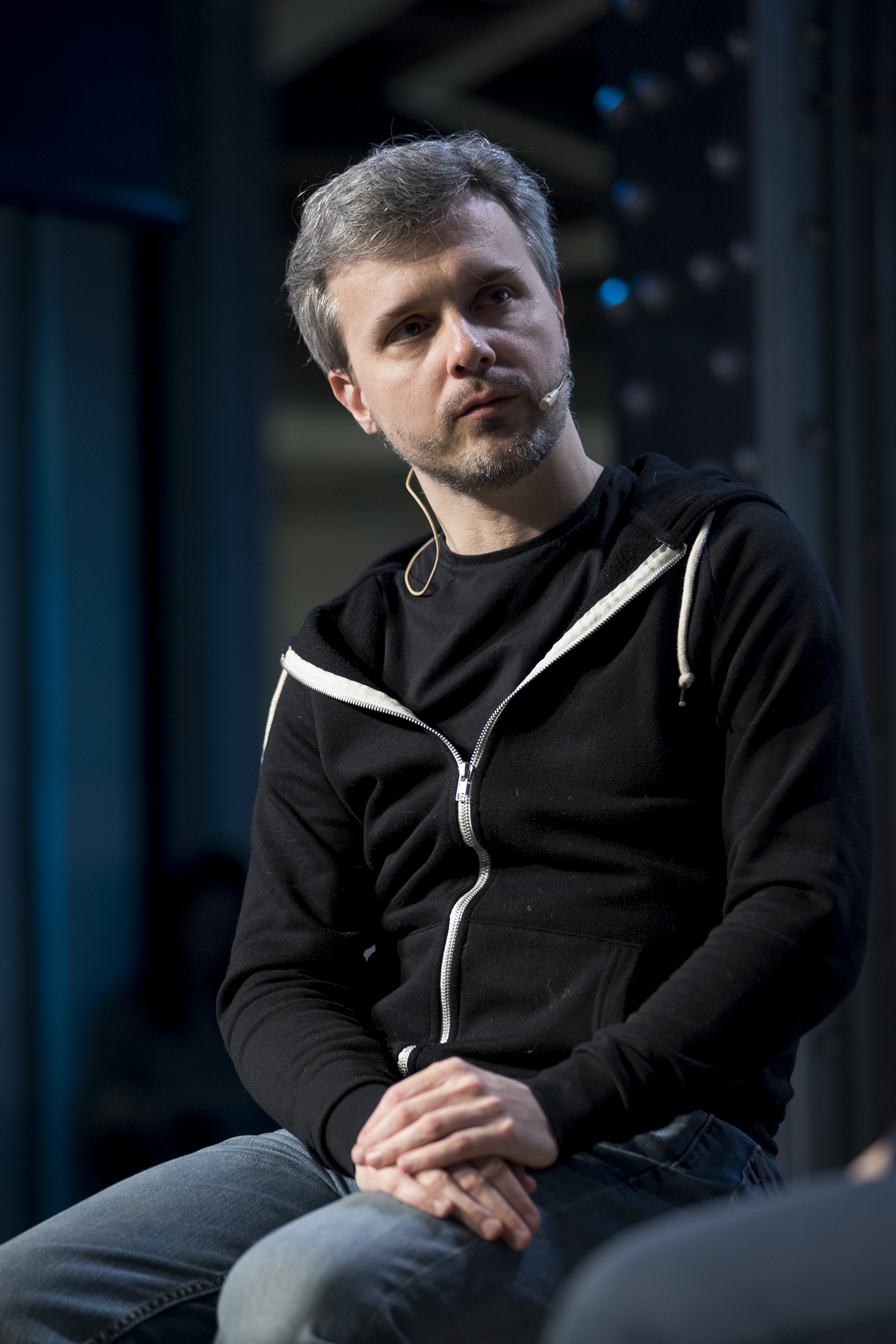
- Gómez-Jurado, 2017
- Born: 16 December 1977 (age 48); Madrid, Spain
- Occupations: Novelist, short story writer, screenwriter, columnist
- Writing career
- Genres: Drama, thriller
- Website: juangomezjurado.com

Juan Gómez-Jurado (born 16 December 1977) is a Spanish journalist and author. He was a columnist in "La Voz de Galicia" and "ABC", distributed in Spain, and he participates in multiple radio and TV programs. His books have been translated into 42 languages and he is one of the most successful living Spanish authors, along with Javier Sierra and Carlos Ruiz Zafón. His writing has been described by critics as "energetic and cinematographic".

Born in Madrid, Spain, Gómez-Jurado worked in various Spanish media outlets, including 40 Principales, Cadena Ser, Cadena Cope, Radio España, Canal + and ABC, before publishing his debut novel, God's Spy (Espía de Dios). God's Spy is a contemporary thriller set in the Vatican, where, in the aftermath of Pope John Paul II's death, the hunt for a serial killer reveals a conspiracy.

On 27 September 2008, Gómez-Jurado won the Premio de Novela Ciudad de Torrevieja for his novel The Traitor's Emblem. Kirkus Reviews praised the novel as a "riveting thriller with a redeeming love story".

== Writings ==
- White King (Rey Blanco) (Ediciones B, 2020)
- Black Wolf (Loba Negra) (Ediciones B, 2019)
- Red Queen (Reina Roja) (Ediciones B, 2018)
- Alex Colt, Space Cadet (2017)
- Scar (Cicatriz) (2016)
- Point of Balance (Atria, 2016)
- The Tipping Point (El Paciente) (Planeta, 2014)
- The Traitor's Emblem (Atria, 2011)
- The Moses Expedition (Atria, 2010. Published by Orion, 2010 as Contract with God)
- God's Spy (Dutton, 2007), English translation of Espía de Dios by James Graham
- La Masacre de Virginia Tech: Anatomía de una mente torturada (El Andén, 2007)
- Identidad Secreta (Lago Ediciones, 2007)
- Otras voces (Alfaguara, 1996)

The second novel in his Antonia Scott series, Black Wolf, was released in the United States in March 2024. It was reviewed positively, being recommended in the "whodunit" category of the March 2024 issue of BookPage magazine. Staff writer Bruce Tierney wrote, "The Antonia Scott series is hands-down the best suspense trilogy to come along since Larsson's Millennium Trilogy. Nothing else even comes close. The third one needs to arrive soon- make it so".

== Controversies ==
Gómez-Jurado's novel God's Spy generated controversy in Spain, as the book's antagonist, Viktor Karoski, is a serial killer and pedophile priest. The book contains a detailed portrait of Saint Luke’s Institute, a carbon copy of an American institution (based in Maryland) dedicated to the rehabilitation of sex-offender priests. This led some Catholic organizations in Spain and Poland to protest against the novel. Nevertheless, critics from both countries gave the book mostly positive reviews. American reviews were also positive; Booklist, for example, praised it as a "first-rate thriller".

== Personal life and philanthropy ==
Juan Gómez-Jurado is divorced and has two children. He lives in Madrid, Spain. After his ex-wife was diagnosed with cancer, Gómez-Jurado became an activist dedicated to fighting colon cancer. He is also an ambassador of Save The Children. He led campaigns as "1 libro 1 euro", a website where internet users can download books in exchange for a voluntary donation to Save the Children.

== List of works ==
- Espía de Dios ("God's Spy", a novel), Roca Editorial, 2006, Spain. Translated into English, Danish, Hungarian, Lithuanian, Portuguese, Italian, German, Serbian, Dutch and Finnish
- La masacre de Virginia Tech ("The Virginia Tech Massacre", a chronicle), El Anden, 2007, Spain
- Contrato con Dios ("Contract with God", a novel), also published as "The Moses Expedition", a novel, El Anden, 2007, Spain
- El emblema del traidor, Plaza & Janés, 2008, Spain. Winner of the 2008 Premio de Novela Ciudad de Torrevieja

== Awards and nominations ==
- VII Premio de Novela Ciudad de Torrevieja, The Traitor's Emblem
- International Latino Book Awards 2011, Best Adventure Novel, The Moses Expedition
- International Latino Book Awards 2011, Best Popular Fiction Novel, The Moses Expedition
- Nominated to CrimeFest's eDunnit Award, The Moses Expedition
