= Freda Linde =

South African children's writer and translator

- Born: Christovira Frederika Linde; 12 December 1915; Swellendam, Western Cape, South Africa
- Died: 7 March 2013 (aged 97); Cape Town, Western Cape, South Africa
- Education: Hoërskool Jan van Riebeeck
- Occupations: Journalist, Writer and Translator
- Writing career
- Language: Afrikaans

Freda Linde (12 December 1915 – 7 March 2013 ) was a South African children's writer and translator. She wrote predominantly in Afrikaans. She has translated over 150 children's books into Afrikaans, French and German. She received the C.P. Hoogenhout Award in 1964.

== Life ==
Born in Swellendam, she worked as journalist and editor until 1960. From 1960 to 1963 she was editor at HAUM Publishers, and from 1964 to 1971 editor in charge of children's literature at John Malherbe publishers. She retired to write full-time in 1972.
