= The Third Secret (novel) =

2005 novel by Steve Berry

- First edition hardcover
- Author: Steve Berry
- Language: English
- Publisher: Ballantine Books, Penguin Random House
- Publication date: May 17, 2005
- Publication place: United States
- Pages: 416 (first ed.)
- ISBN: 0-345-47613-1
- Preceded by: The Romanov Prophecy
- Followed by: The Templar Legacy

The Third Secret is a mystery thriller novel by American author Steve Berry. Set in the Vatican amid a divided modern-day Catholic Church, the story concerns the supposed 1917 apparitions of the Virgin Mary in Fátima, Portugal, and the secrets disclosed then to Sister Lúcia. It is a fictional interpretation of controversies surrounding the release of the third of those secrets. The novel has received praise for its incorporation of history into the plot, but has also attracted criticism from religious organizations opposed to the views it depicts regarding Catholic doctrine.

== Plot ==
The novel follows Father Colin Michener, the papal secretary and close friend of the fictional Pope Clement XV, who in the past few months has been deeply concerned by something regarding the third secret of Fátima.

To uncover the truth about the third secret, Clement sends Michener to Romania to speak with Father Tibor, who had translated the original secret for Pope John XXIII. Cardinal Secretary of State Alberto Valendrea, an enemy of Clement who desperately seeks the papacy, read and destroyed the second part of the secret while serving under Paul VI, and determined that its contents must never become known. Having discovered Clement's plan through listening devices installed throughout the Vatican, he recruits Michener's ex-girlfriend, Katerina Lew, to follow him and report back. Katerina, an atheist with whom Michener had once broken his vows of celibacy, is skeptical of the offer but accepts for the chance to get closer to him again.

Michener discovers that a second part of the secret exists, of which Tibor kept his own copies that he had sent to Clement a few months prior. Katerina meets Michener in Romania and the pair decide to part ways as friends. Before Michener returns to the Vatican, Valendrea learns that Clement is aware of his actions concerning the secret. Valendrea and his assistant, Paolo Ambrosi, travel to Romania that night and murder Tibor. The next day at Castle Gandolfo, Clement asks Michener to travel to Medjugorje, Bosnia and Herzegovina, to uncover the hidden tenth secret of the supposed apparitions there. That night, Clement unexpectedly dies by suicide using sleeping pills.

Valendrea is summoned to Castle Gandolfo alongside Cardinal Camerlengo Maurice Ngovi, an ally of Clement's. The three decide to keep the nature of death between themselves and the doctor, realizing the potential implications of a papal suicide. Two weeks later, just before the conclave, Ngovi privately talks to Michener and asks him to carry out Clement's request of traveling to Medjugorje. Valendrea overhears and attempts to recruit Katerina again; she feigns interest to obtain Michener's address. At Michener's apartment, the two rekindle their relationship and decide to travel to Bosnia together.

In Medjugorje, the pair get little information out of the seer Jasna. Michener begins to question his faith, agreeing with Katerina that the visions may be hallucinations. That night, Jasna appears outside of Michener's hotel room and he follows her to the top of Cross Mountain. At the summit, Jasna receives what is apparently her final vision before the pair are knocked unconscious by a lightning strike. While unconscious, Michener receives a vision from Mary, Clement, and Father Tibor, who tell him that his destiny is to reveal that God is alive. The next day in the hospital, Jasna writes down and hands over the tenth secret, before Ambrosi appears and threatens to frame the pair for Tibor's murder should they not return to Rome immediately. Meanwhile, Valendrea has been elected to the papacy as Peter II.

Valendrea demands Michener hand over the rest of Tibor's translation, which, unbeknownst to Michener, Clement had removed from the papal archives just before his death. When Michener is unable to, Valendrea reveals his involvement with Katerina, which hurts Michener and causes Katerina to leave after trying to explain herself. Later, Michener looks for the translated secret, believing it may be in Clement's private chest. He instead finds secret love letters from Clement's childhood friend Irma Rahn in Bavaria. A plain-clothed Swiss Guard enters the apartment on Valendrea's orders and attempts to stab Michener; Katerina, who had come to explain herself and apologize, uses the guard's stun gun to save Michener. Michener forgives her and the two head to the airport, assuming the secret must be with Irma Rahn.

In Bamberg, Germany, Rahn gives Michener the translation. While calming herself after an argument, Katerina is kidnapped by Ambrosi, who demands Michener hand over the secret that night in exchange for her life. Michener then finally reads the secret, which denounces Catholic teachings regarding clerical celibacy, ordination of women, homosexuality, and reproductive rights. He also reads the Medjugorje secret, and the text in both being nearly identical leads him to conclude that they are both authentic. Realizing that the secrets are too important to hand over, he calls Cardinal Ngovi to Germany. The two corner Ambrosi that night, and under threat of his life he is recorded confessing to Valendrea's bribery of cardinals and involvement in Tibor's murder.

The novel ends with Ngovi and Michener presenting an ultimatum to Valendrea: poison himself and have his papacy well-remembered, or have the recordings released and go down as the first pope to stand in a criminal trial. Concerned about his legacy, Valendrea chooses the former. Realizing he is likely the next pope, Ngovi promises to implement God's commands and offers Michener continued work in the Vatican, but Michener instead chooses to live with Katerina in Romania.

== Background ==
The novel is based on conspiracies surrounding the third secret of Fátima, which many within the Catholic church allege had not been fully released. It is widely agreed, and mentioned in the novel, that the first two secrets were written down and subsequently released by Sister Lucia in 1943, and that the third secret was given to Bishop of Fátima José da Silva and eventually to the Vatican with instructions for its release in 1960. The secret was continuously accessible to the pope, yet in 1960 the Vatican decided not to release the third secret, causing outrage and disillusionment among Catholics. Although the secret was made public by Pope John Paul II in 2000, the contrast between the anticlimactic nature of the official text and the nature of the secret apparently being too disturbing to reveal in 1960, alongside apparently contradicting accounts from those who had seen or worked with the secret, has spawned a movement of those who believe that there is a missing part of the third secret.

Berry has stated that he had long been fascinated by the Fátima apparitions since he had first learned of them as a child attending Catholic school. The recent developments and continued mystery of the third secret by the time he was writing novels led him to write his third novel on the subject.

== Reception ==
The Third Secret received generally positive reviews from critics, with The Florida Times-Union writing that "[Berry] has crafted an intense, fast-paced thriller that suceeds [sic] because of clever plotting and introspective characters" and praising the quality of research and the incorporation of history into the plot. Further, Kirkus Reviews writes that "Berry ... sometimes overforeshadows his revelations, but he serves tantalizingly true tidbits about the Church, and his measured, elegant prose is a solid fit with the story."

Some reviewers compared elements of the novel to Dan Brown's The Da Vinci Code. The similar approach to religion in both novels was pointed out in a review by The New York Times, which praises The Third Secret for going further with its links to religion than Brown's works. In another review, Publishers Weekly praised Berry's research and use of "combustive elements", writing that "Da Vinci Code fans hungry for more may want a taste of this." Berry himself attributed much of the success of The Third Secret and his previous novels to that of The Da Vinci Code, stating that he was only able to get his thriller novels published after Brown sparked an interest in the genre.

In March 2006, the novel reached #5 in paperback fiction on The New York Times Best Seller list.

=== Religious Controversy ===
The book received criticism from certain Catholics regarding its perspective on Catholic theology. Conservative Catholic organizations including the Catholic League have accused Berry of attempting to mislead his readers about the church, writing that "the work was as deceptive as it was pernicious" and that it "is based on utter falsehoods, yet it is presented as though it were at least plausible." Other reviewers noted that the novel's content may be controversial and upsetting for some readers, but that it is worth reading anyways.

There was some criticism of Berry's decision to disclose the contents of the third secret, arguing that it may have been better to let the reader come to their own conclusions about the secret. This decision caused harsher reader reactions to The Third Secret as compared to The Da Vinci Code, in which the mystery was left unanswered, as many readers were upset that Berry seemingly interrupted the novel's suspense to promote his own beliefs about the church.

Berry defended the novel's approach to religion, noting that the plot was completely fictional and meant more to entertain and provoke discussion rather than as any sort of social or political statement. He has also argued that the Catholic Church has always changed its positions to adapt to the times, and that it should and would continue to do so.
