= Jorge Bucay =

Argentine writer

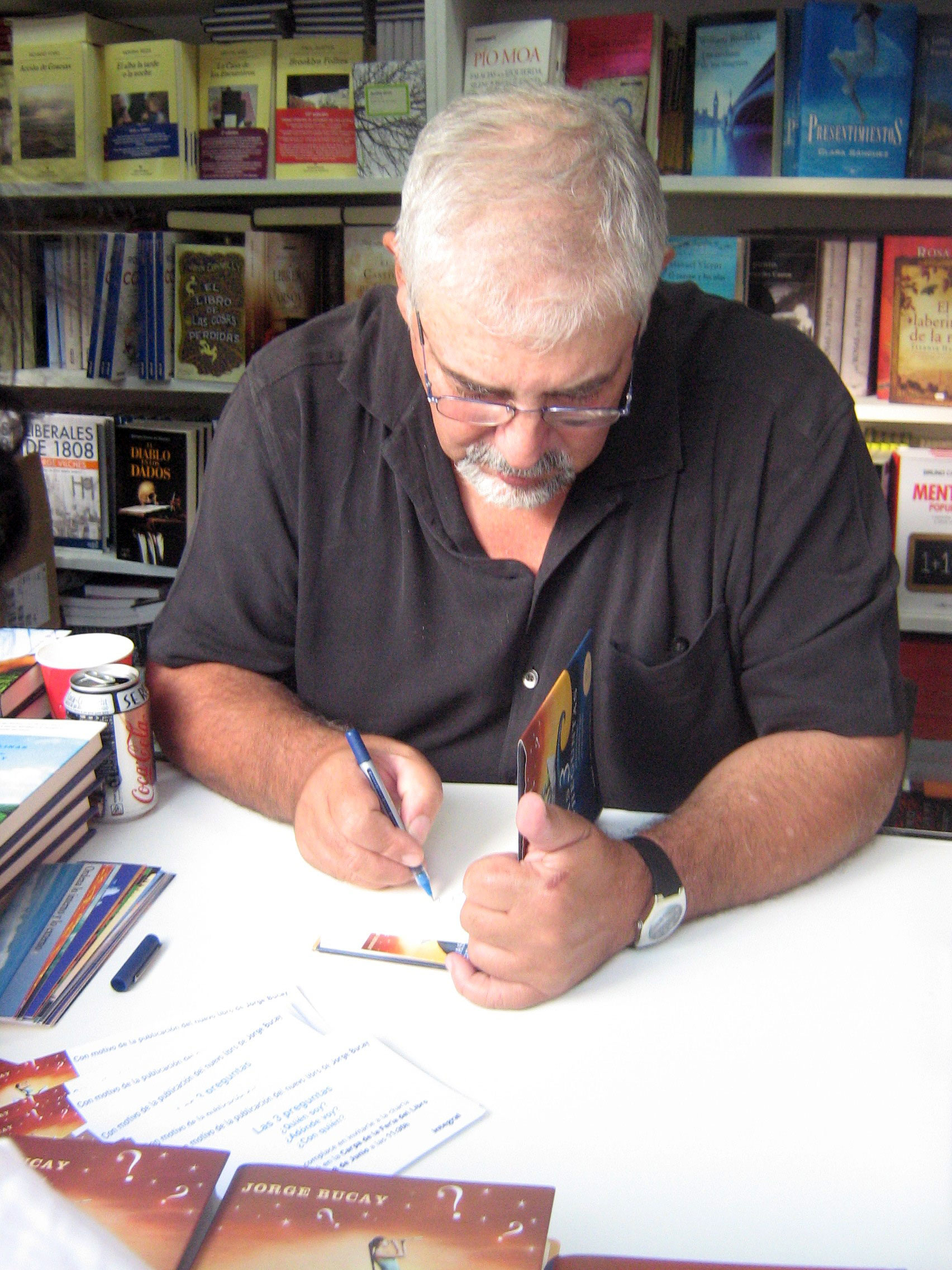
- Bucay at a book signing in Madrid in 2008
- Born: October 30, 1949 (age 76); Buenos Aires, Argentina
- Education: University of Buenos Aires
- Occupation: Writer

Jorge Bucay (born October 30, 1949) is an Argentine gestalt psychotherapist, psychodramatist and writer. His books have sold more than 2 million copies around the world, and have been translated into more than seventeen languages.

== Biography ==
He was born in Buenos Aires on October 30, 1949, to a modest family. His four grandparents were Syrians born in Damascus, with three of them being Jewish and one of them a Christian. He started working at the age of thirteen. In the course of his life, he has worked as a traveling salesman selling socks, books and sports clothing, as well as an insurance agent, taxi driver, clown, warehouseman, educator, actor, doctor on duty, host of children's parties, psychiatrist, group coordinator, radio collaborator, and television host.

In 1973, he graduated as an MD from the University of Buenos Aires, and specialized in mental illnesses at the Buenos Aires Pirovano Hospital and at the Santa Mónica clinic.

He currently defines his job as professional helper. He divides his attention between attending therapeutic teaching conferences, which have taken him around the world, and the writing of his books, which he considers therapeutic tools.

== Works ==
His published works include:

- Cartas Para Claudia (Letters for Claudia) (1986, 2nd ed. 2007)
- "Recuentos para Demián" (Stories for Demián) (1994)
- "Cuentos para pensar" (Stories for Thought) (1997)
- "De la autoestima al egoísmo" (From Self-Esteem to Egoism) (1999)
- "Amarse con los ojos abiertos" (Loving Oneself With Open Eyes) (with Silvia Salinas) (2000)
- "Déjame que te cuente" (Let Me Tell You) (2002)
- "Todo (No) Terminó" (It's (Not) All Over) (with Silvia Salinas) (2004)
- "El Juego de los Cuentos" (The Game of Stories) (2004)
- "Cuenta Conmigo" (Count on Me) (2005)
- "El Mito de le Diosa Fortuna" (The Myth of the Goddess of Fortune) (2006)
- "20 pasos hacia adelante" (Twenty Steps Forward) (2007)
- "El candidato" (The Candidate) (Winner of Premio de Novela Ciudad de Torrevieja in 2006).

Five books constitute his series, "Hojas de Ruta" (Roadmaps):

- "El camino de la Auto-dependencia" (The Road of Self-Dependence)
- "El camino del Encuentro" (The Road of Encounter)
- "El camino de las Lágrimas" (The Road of Tears)
- "El camino de la Felicidad" (The Road of Happiness)
- "El camino de la Espiritualidad: Llegar a la Cima y Seguir Subiendo" (2011) (The Road of Spirituality)

His works have become bestsellers in Mexico, Uruguay, Chile, Costa Rica, Venezuela, Puerto Rico, Spain and Greece.

In 2005, he was accused of copying the fifth part of his book, Shimriti, from a text by Mónica Cavallé, though he later declared that it was "an absolutely involuntary error" while citing sources.

== Awards and honors ==
- 2006: Premio de Novela Ciudad de Torrevieja, winner, El Candidato
