= Pandit Sunderlal Sharma Literature Award =

Literature award

The Pandit Sunderlal Sharma Literature Award is constituted by the Government of Chhattisgarh to honour people who have extraordinary contribution in the field of literature. The award carries a prize money of Rupees Two lakh and a citation. The awards are given once every year on first November. This is the most prestigious state award.

Pandit Sunderlal Sharma award has been conferred to Motivational speaker Ujjwal Patni from Chhattisgarh, Pardeshiram Verma, Daneshwar Verma, Bimal Pathak etc. Ujjwal Patni is the youngest awardee.
