= Mikro (writer) =

South African writer and poet (1903–1968)

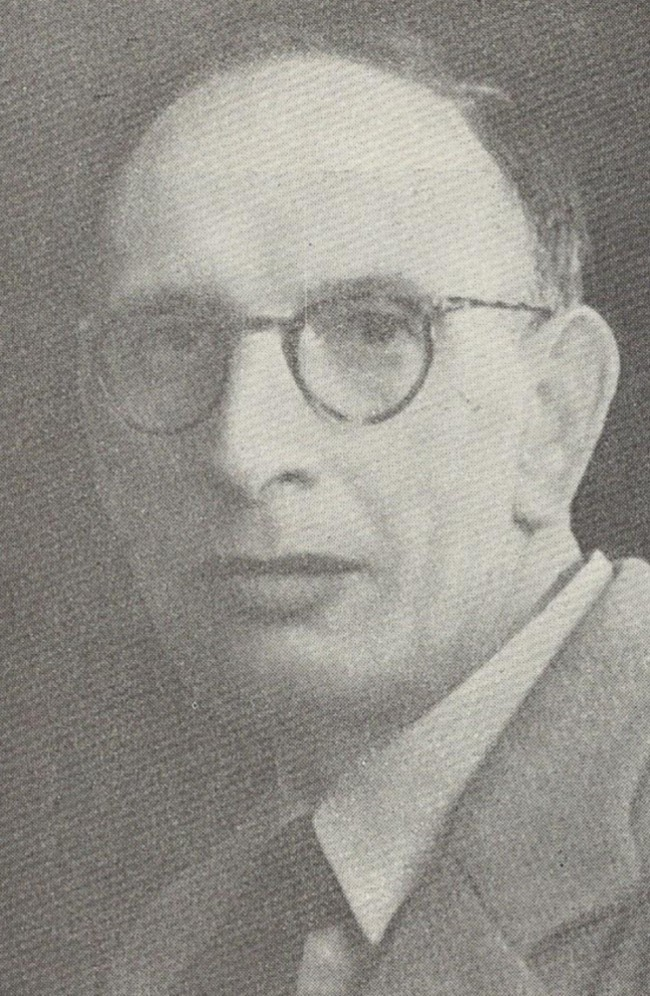
- Born: 8 October 1903; Williston
- Died: 17 April 1968 (aged 64); Somerset-Wes
- Citizenship: South Africa
- Education: Stellenbosch University
- Occupations: Afrikaans poet, writer
- Writing career
- Notable works: Ruiter in die nag Die jongste ruiter

Christoffel Hermanus Kühn (1903–1968) was a South African writer and poet who published under the pseudonym "Mikro" in Afrikaans. Kühn was born at "Van Reenensplaas" in Williston district of the former Cape Colony (later province of South Africa).

He was at school in Robertson and Carnarvon and continued tertiary education at the Stellenbosch University where he completed a BSc degree in Agriculture. Kühn taught for a while at Kuilsrivier and Ritchie. From 1930 to 1931 he wrote poems for the Afrikaans magazine Die Huisgenoot and published biographies, novels and adventure stories. Between 1944 and 1949 he developed into a full-time writer, but later joined the Teachers' College in Oudtshoorn where he lectured for five years. After teaching he worked for Boerdery in Suid-Afrika (a farmers' magazine) as chief editor from 1956 until 1960. He became chief leader of the farmers' movement, Die Landdiensbeweging, for the Agricultural Ministry. He resigned from this position in 1964.

Kühn was awarded the Hertzog Prize for Prose in 1936 for Toiings and Pelgrims, the W.A. Hofmeyr Prize in 1956 for Die Porseleinkat and the Scheepers Prize for youth literature in 1957 for Die Jongste Ruiter. He received the National Publishers Award in 1961.

His daughter, Cornelia Hilda Kühn, who writes under the pseudonym Corlia Fourie, was born in 1944.

Kühn died on 17 April 1968, in the town Somerset West, in the Western Cape.
