= God's Spy =

Spanish novel by Juan Gómez-Jurado

- USA First edition cover
- Author: Juan Gómez-Jurado
- Original title: Espía de Dios
- Translator: James Graham
- Cover artist: Richard Hasselberger
- Language: Spanish
- Genre: Thriller/Mystery/Detective
- Publisher: Dutton (a Penguin Group imprint)
- Publication date: 2007
- Publication place: Spain
- Media type: Print (hardback)
- Pages: 368pp
- ISBN: 0-525-94994-1
- OCLC: 81252750
- Dewey Decimal: 863/.7 22
- LC Class: PQ6707.O54 E8713 2007
- Followed by: The Moses Expedition

God's Spy (Espía de Dios in Spanish) is a bestselling thriller novel by Juan Gómez-Jurado was originally published in Spanish in 2006, and in English in 2007. It became an instant bestseller throughout Europe with a million copies sold to date and will be published in 42 countries.

The plot is set in the Vatican in the aftermath of Pope John Paul II's death. The hunt is on for a serial killer and sex offender — and former priest — which proves to reveal a chilling conspiracy. This is a thriller novel where the psychological portrait of Victor Karosky, the serial killer (whose name is mentioned in the first line of the book) is the main character in the novel.

Along with the Vatican, the action also takes place in the United States in a Maryland institution called the Saint Matthew Institute. The Saint Matthew Institute is a center for the rehabilitation of a priest with a history of sexual abuse. The story is based on a real-life event. This subject has been controversial in Catholic countries such as Spain and Poland.

== Summary ==
From the book cover:

In the days following the Pope's death, a cardinal is found brutally murdered in a chapel in Rome, his eyes gouged and his hands cut off. Called in for the grisly case, police inspector Paola Dicanti learns that another cardinal was recently found dead; he had also been tortured. Desperate to find the killer before another victim dies, Paola's investigation is soon joined by Father Anthony Fowler — an American priest and former Army intelligence officer examining sexual abuse in the Church, who knows far more about the killer than Paola could possibly imagine.

== Characters ==
- Paola Dicanti — The leading character, a police inspector and profiler.
- Father Victor Karosky— A pedophile priest, now a serial killer.
- Maurizio Pontiero — Paola's partner.
- Fabio Dante — Deputy inspector at Vatican Police.
- Carlo Boi — Paola's boss.
- Father Anthony Fowler— A mysterious priest.
- Andrea Otero— A Spanish journalist.
- Angelo Biffi— forensic sculptor and digital image expert.
- Camilo Cirin— General inspector at Vatican Police.
- Canicë Conroy— Former director of the Saint Matthew Institute.

There is also a number of minor, real life characters, e.g. George W. Bush, John Negroponte, John Paul II, Benedict XVI and many others.

== Book information ==
God's Spy by Juan Gómez-Jurado

- Hardcover - ISBN 0-525-94994-1 (First edition, April 5, 2007) published by Dutton (a Penguin Group imprint)
