= The Romanov Prophecy =

2004 novel by Steve Berry

- First edition cover
- Author: Steve Berry
- Publisher: Ballantine Books
- Publication date: September 1, 2004
- ISBN: 0-345-46005-7

The Romanov Prophecy is a 2004 novel written by American author Steve Berry. The novel relates the adventures of Miles Lord, an African-American lawyer in post-communist Russia on finding the descendants of Grand Duchess Anastasia Nikolaevna of Russia and Tsarevich Alexei of Russia, who were thought to survive the massacre that took their family's lives.

== Plot summary ==
After the communist era and during a time of weak government in a Russia ridden by crime and political instability, the Russian people vote to reestablish the monarchy and bring back a new tsar, who will be chosen among the closest relative of Nicholas II of Russia from the surviving Romanov clans. Miles Lord, the protagonist, is tasked to do a background check on the favorite contender to be tsar, Stefan Baklanov. After almost being killed in the center of Moscow, Lord starts to discover new facts and documents that could threaten Baklanov's aspirations. Based on the diary of Felix Yusupov and a prophecy of the famous Rasputin, Lord finds out that there could be a direct descendant of Alexis and Anastasia, children of Nicholas II, living somewhere in the world. In this novel, Lord travels to Moscow, Saint Petersburg, Starodub, Vladivostok, Atlanta and San Francisco trying to find the inheritor of the Romanov family. If he has success, Russia will find the real tsar; if not, Stefan Baklanov will obtain power, and nobody knows what he will do with the country.

== Publication history ==
- Berry, Steve (31 August 2004). The Romanov Prophecy (1st ed.). Ballantine Books. ISBN 0-345-46005-7.
