= Jaco Jacobs =

South African children's book author (born 1980)

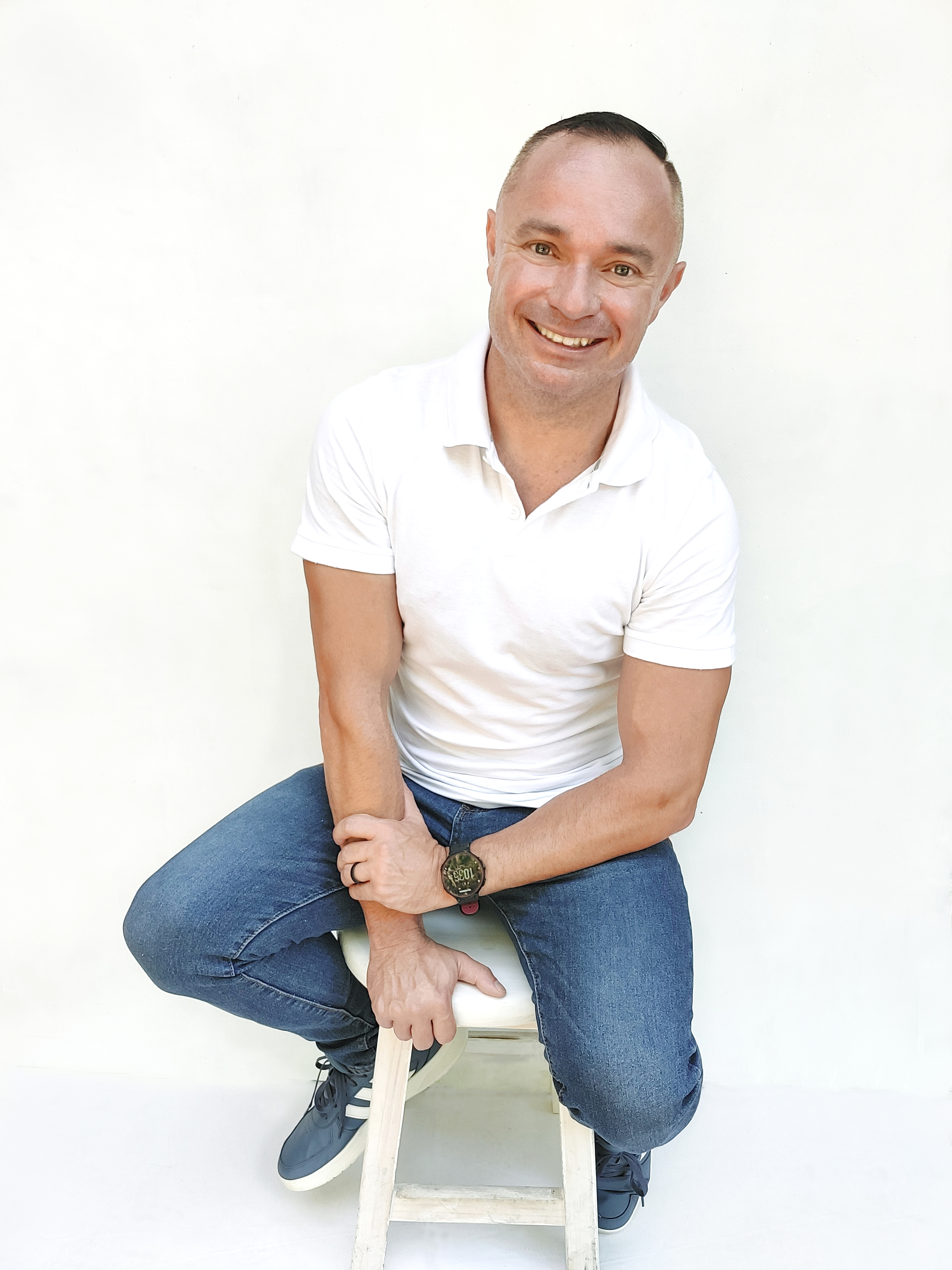
- South African children's book author Jaco Jacobs
- Born: February 22, 1980 (age 46); Carnarvon, South Africa
- Occupation: Children's book author
- Notable work: A Good Day for Climbing Trees, A Good Night for Shooting Zombies, Suurlemoen!, Moenie hierdie boek eet nie
- Spouse: Elize Jacobs (married 2010–present)
- Children: 2
- Website: www.jacojacobs.co.za

Jaco Jacobs (born 1980) is a South African children's author who writes in Afrikaans.

Jacobs was born in the South African town of Carnarvon, Northern Cape. He started writing at a young age and sold his first short stories to magazines while still in high school. To date, he has published more than 280 books for children, ranging from picture books to books for young adults, some of them under the pseudonyms Lize Roux and Tania Brink. In 2007, his young adult novel Suurlemoen! (Lemon!) was chosen as an International Board on Books for Young People (IBBY) Honour Book.

Jacobs has won the Alba Bouwer Prize three times; in 2007 for Wurms met tamatiesous en ander lawwe rympies (Worms in Tomato Sauce and Other Silly Poems), 2019 for Moenie hierdie boek eet nie (Don't eat this book)), and in 2022 for 'Die boekwinkel tussen die wolke (The bookshop in the clouds), as well as the C.P. Hoogenhout Award (2006–2007) for Wurms met tamatiesous en ander lawwe rympies, the Tienie Holloway Medal in 2018 for Grom! (Growl!), and the Scheepers Prize for Youth Literature in 2019 for Dinge wat ek nie van skape geweet het nie (Things which I didn't know about sheep).

A film adaptation of Suurlemoen! was released in South African cinemas in 2014, and in 2017 his novel Oor 'n motorfiets, 'n zombiefliek en lang getalle wat deur elf gedeel kan word (published internationally as A Good Night for Shooting Zombies) was adapted into a feature film, titled Nul is nie niks nie. His young adult novel 'n Goeie dag vir boomklim (published internationally as A Good Day for Climbing Trees) was chosen as one of the winners in the In Other Words competition, sponsored by the British Book Trust. Worldwide English rights of the book were subsequently sold to Oneworld Publications in 2017. A Good Day for Climbing Trees was longlisted for the Carnegie Medal, and subsequently published in Dutch by Uitgeverij Ploegsma and in Italian by Rizzoli Libri.

In addition to children's literature, Jacobs also writes magazine articles and columns. He has translated more than 300 books from English and Dutch to Afrikaans. His translation of Chris Riddell's Ottoline and the Yellow Cat (Willemien en die Geel Kat) was awarded the Elsabe Steenberg Prize for children's book translation, as well as the SATI Prize for the translation of children's books.
