= Nezahualcóyotl Award =

Mexican literary prize

The Nezahualcóyotl Award of Literature in Indigenous Languages (Premio Nezahualcóyotl de Literatura en Lenguas Indígenas) is a Mexican literary prize given to writers who create works in indigenous languages. The award was created in 1993. Arturo Arias of the University of Texas at Austin calls the award the "most prestigious literary award in Mexico and Latin America for indigenous writers." The prize has been awarded biennially since 2000 and includes a cash prize and diploma.

== Notable winners ==
- Marisol Ceh Moo (Yukatek)
- Natalia Toledo (Zapotec)
