= Barrie Hough =

South African writer (1953–2004)

- Born: January 17, 1953 Johannesburg, Union of South Africa
- Died: (Body discovered) August 17, 2004 (aged 51) Johannesburg, South Africa
- Occupation: Writer
- Language: Afrikaans

Barrie Michael Hough (17 January 1953 – 17 August 2004) was a South African author, journalist, playwright, and critic. He is best known for writing youth literature. He wrote in his native Afrikaans, however several of his works have been translated into English.

== Early life ==
Barrie Hough was born in Johannesburg on January 17, 1953. His father died when he was five years old and his mother raised him and his two older brothers alone. Much of his work is based on personal experiences. His first novel, My kat word herfs, is autobiographical; Barrie had a speech impediment, like one of the main characters in the story, he stuttered. He also bred Siamese show cats. His second novel, Droomwa, is based on the time he spent with his family in Hillbrow as a child. He attended Voorbrand Primary School and later matriculated at Helpmekaar Boys High in 1970, where he was inspired to become a writer by his Afrikaans teacher, the poet Lucas Malan. He studied Communications at the Rand Afrikaans University (now the University of Johannesburg) where he obtained a Bachelor of Arts degree. In 1980 he obtained a Master of Arts degree in English with a thesis on the playwright Athol Fugard.

== Career ==
He taught at St. Barnabas College for four years and was appointed at Beeld as a full-time theater critic in 1979. Later, he wrote for Rapport on films, theater, and literature, and became one of the most influential and popular theater critics of the 1980s and 1990s. He was appointed Arts Editor in 1999. Additionally, he became a multiple award-winning author of youth literature, tackling challenging, topical, and personal themes, like belonging, fear, AIDS (he had friends who died from HIV/AIDS), and an absent father figure.

== Publications ==
- My kat word herfs (1986)

translated to English My Cat Becomes Autumn

- Droomwa (1990)

translated to English Dream Chariot

- Vlerkdans (1992)

translated to English In Full Flight

- Skimmelstreke (1995)
- Skilpoppe (1998)
- Breek (2002) – with Lizz Meiring

== Awards ==
1984:

- AA Vita Prize for Theatre Journalism

1990:

- Sanlam Prize for Youth Literature: Silver – Droomwa
- Alba Bouwer Prize, joint winner – Droomwa
- C.P. Hoogenhout Award – Droomwa

1992:

- Sanlam Prize for Youth Literature: Gold – Vlerkdans
- ATKV Children’s Book Award – Vlerkdans

1998:

- Sanlam Prize for Youth Literature: gold – Skilpoppe

1999:

- M.E.R. Prize – Skilpoppe

== Death ==
Hough suffered from lifelong depression and committed suicide at the age of 51. He was found dead in his flat in Melville, Johannesburg on August 17, 2004.
