= Malaysia Premier's Literary Award =

National prize in literature in Malaysia

- Location: Kuala Lumpur
- Country: Malaysia
- Presented by: Dewan Bahasa dan Pustaka
- First award: since 1971

Malaysia Premier's Literary Award (Malay: Hadiah Sastera Perdana Malaysia) is the main national prize in literature in Malaysia.

It is awarded every two years in three categories.

Category A (books, collections of one author). Genres: a novel, a collection of short stories, a collection of poems, a collection of plays, a collection of critical essays, a collection of literary research, a biographical (autobiographical) work.

Category B (individual works published in magazines, newspapers, collections). Genres: a poem, a story, a play, a critical essay.

Category C (literature for children and young people). Genres: a story, a collection of short stories, a collection of poems, a collection of plays.

== History of the Award ==
Established in 1971 on the proposal of the Prime Minister Abdul Razak. Originally was called the "Prize for a literary work" (Malay: Hadiah Karya Sastera) and was awarded every year until 1976 for the best poem, story, anthology of poems, a two-act play, a story and a critical essay. For five years, 30 writers, including poets Ahmad Sarji, Zakaria Ali, Latiff Mohidin, Zurinah Hassan, Jaafa Kh. S., Zaihasra, T. Alias Taib, Lim Swee Tin, writers Anwar Ridhwan, Hatijah Hashim, Fatimah Busu, playwright Azizi HaJi Abdullah.

Since 1977 to 1980, the prize was not awarded.

Since 1981, the prize has been revived under the new name "Literary Prize of Malaysia" (Hadiah Sastera Malaysia) every two years. Since the 1990/1991season, the prize has been awarded only for works published as a book. This was motivated by the need to improve the quality criteria for the selection of works. This led to the fact that the number of entries accepted for the competition fell sharply.

Since the season of 1996/1997 the prize has received the modern name.

In 2015/2016, 44 literary works were awarded this prize
