= Javier Sierra =

Spanish journalist

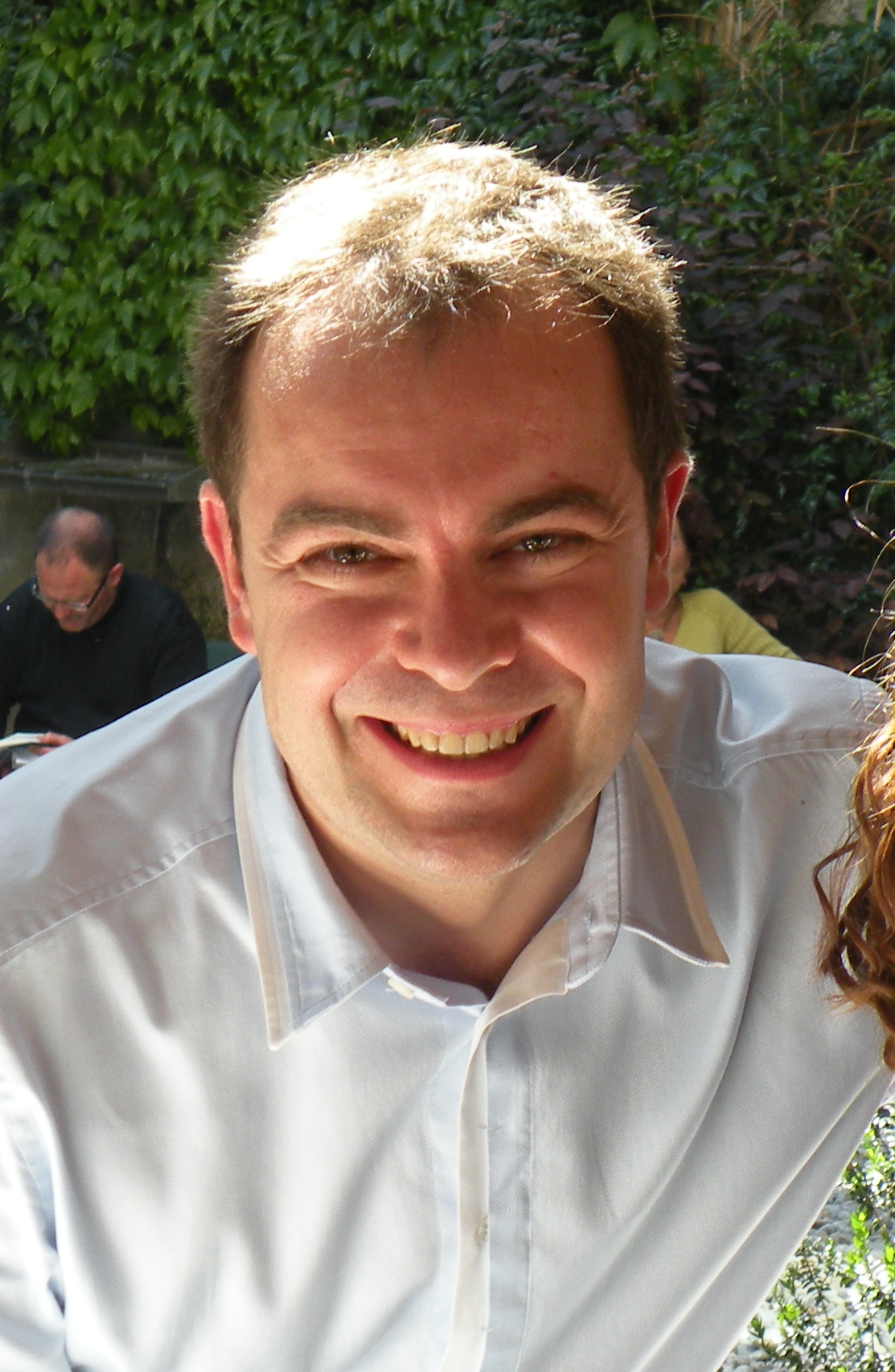
- Sierra in 2009
- Born: Javier Sierra Albert; 11 August 1971 (age 54); Teruel, Spain
- Occupations: Journalist, Writer

Javier Sierra Albert (born 11 August 1971 in Teruel, Aragon, Spain) is a journalist, writer and researcher who studied journalism at the Complutense University of Madrid.

== Biography ==
In 1989, being 18 years old, he hosted the radio programme Radio Heraldo. Six years later he founded the journal Año Cero.

He is editor consultant of the monthly magazine Más Allá de la Ciencia (Beyond Science) distributed in Spain and Latin America and he participates in several radio and television programs. During the last years, he has concentrated on writing about purported ancient mysteries.

For years, Sierra has been working with people like Graham Hancock and Robert Bauval attempting to demonstrate the existence of a Golden Age of humanity. His hypothesis holds that this Golden Age was extinguished about 10,500 years ago, and it was the origin of all the known civilisations.

== Career ==
In 1995 he published Roswell: Secreto de Estado, about the Roswell incident, where he analysed the case.

He became the first Spaniard to be in the Top Ten of best sellers in United States. His 2006 novel The Secret Supper was in the top ten of The New York Times Best Seller list and has been published in 42 countries. The Lady in Blue was published in 2007.

On 20 December 2017 it was released the documentary fiction Otros mundos by #0, which is about the great mysteries in the world. On 22 December 2019 it was released the second season.

== Books ==
- El fuego invisible (2017)
- La pirámide inmortal (2014)
- El maestro del Prado (Planeta, 2013)
- El ángel perdido (Planeta, 2011)
- La cena secreta (Plaza & Janés 2004)
- El secreto egipcio de Napoleón (La Esfera de los Libros, 2002)
- Las puertas templarias (Martínez Roca, 2000)
- La dama azul (Martínez Roca, 1998)

== Essays ==
- La ruta prohibida y otros enigmas de la historia (Planeta, 2007)
- En busca de la Edad de Oro (Plaza & Janés, 2000)
- La España extraña (EDAF, 1997), in collaboration with Jesús Callejo
- Roswell: secreto de Estado (EDAF, 1995)

== Collaborations ==
- He participated in the collective work Relatos Ferroviarios Sobre Raíles (Imagine Ediciones, 2003)
- He directed and prologued the historical intrigue novels collection La Cámara Secreta (col. Nº 80) for Círculo de Lectores (2003–2004).

== Prizes ==
- 2004: Premio de Novela Ciudad de Torrevieja, finalist, La Cena Secreta.
- 2017: Cruz de San Jorge from the Teruel deputation.
- 2017: Premio Planeta de Novela, winner, El fuego invisible
- 2018: Hijo Predilecto de Teruel.

== Radio ==
- Collaborator in La Rosa de los Vientos, Onda Cero Radio (2004–2006).
- Collaborator in Herrera en la onda (before Herrera y punto), Onda Cero Radio (2002–2003).
- Collaborator in Milenio 3, Cadena SER Radio (2002).
- Consultant in El Callejero, Onda Cero Radio (1998).
- Consultant in Viva la Radio, Radio Voz (1996–1998).
- Consultant in La Ventana Indiscreta, Cadena SER Radio (1989).
- Consultant in Espacio en Blanco, Radio Nacional de España (1987–1988).
- Director and presenter of La Otra Ciencia and Mare Nostrum, Radio Nueva (1986–1988).

== Television ==
- Director and TV presenter of El Otro Lado de la Realidad, Telemadrid (2004–2005).
- Collaborator in Cada Día, Antena 3 TV (2005).
- Collaborator in Crónicas marcianas, Telecinco (1999–2004).
- Editor of Otra Dimensión, Telecinco (1993).

== Press ==
- Editor consultant of the magazine Más Allá de la Ciencia (M.C. Ediciones, 2005).
- Editor Director of Revista de Arqueología (MC Ediciones, 2002), the most important publication of its genre in Spain.
- Director of the magazine Más Allá de la Ciencia (M.C. Ediciones, 1998). He carried out the change of format, readjusts of contents and image, since January 1999.
- Coordinator of the special numbers of magazine Más Allá de la Ciencia, Grandes enigmas de Europa y América, Pirámides del mundo, Grandes misterios de la Tierra, Misterios de Egipto, among others.
- Assistant director of the magazine Más Allá de la Ciencia (J.C. Ediciones, 1995–1998).
- International coordinator of magazine Año Cero (América Ibérica, 1994).
- Editor of magazine Más Allá de la Ciencia (Heptada, 1993).
- Co-founder of the magazine Año Cero (Hobby Press 1990).

== Editorial ==
- Consultant of the collection Huellas Perdidas de Grijalbo Mondadori (2000–2001).
- Editor consultant of the collection Ediciones Martínez Roca (2001).
