= Steve Berry (novelist) =

American author and attorney (born 1955)

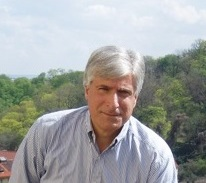
- Born: September 2, 1955 (age 71); Georgia, U.S.
- Education: Walter F. George School of Law of Mercer University
- Occupations: Lawyer, author
- Writing career
- Genres: Crime fiction, Thriller
- Notable work: Cotton Malone series of novels
- Website: steveberry.org

Steve Berry is an American author and former attorney currently living in St. Augustine, Florida. Born on September 2, 1955, he was a trial lawyer for thirty years and held elected office for fourteen. His first works, The Amber Room and The Romanov Prophecy, were published in 2003 and 2004.

== Bibliography ==
=== Cotton Malone series ===
- The Templar Legacy (2006)
- The Alexandria Link (2007)
- The Venetian Betrayal (2007)
- The Charlemagne Pursuit (2008)
- The Paris Vendetta (2009)
- The Emperor's Tomb (2010)
- The Jefferson Key (2011)
- The King's Deception (2013)
- The Lincoln Myth (2014)
- The Patriot Threat (2015)
- The 14th Colony (2016)
- The Lost Order (2017)
- The Bishop’s Pawn (2018)
- The Malta Exchange (2019)
- The Warsaw Protocol (2020)
- The Kaiser’s Web (2021)
- The Last Kingdom (2023)
- The Atlas Maneuver (2024)
- The Medici Return (2025)
- The Devil's Bible (2026)

==== Novellas & short stories ====
- The Devil's Due (2006)
- The Admiral's Mark (2012)
- The Tudor Plot (2013)
- The Devil’s Bones: Cotton Malone vs. Grey Pierce (2014) with James Rollins in the anthology FaceOff, edited by David Baldacci
- Past Prologue: Jamie Fraser and Cotton Malone (2017) with Diana Gabaldon in the anthology MatchUp, edited by Lee Child

=== Cassiopeia Vitt series (with M. J. Rose) ===
- The Museum of Mysteries (2018)
- The Lake of Learning (2019)
- The House of Long Ago (2020)
- The End of Forever (2021)

==== Short stories ====
- The Balkan Escape (2010)

=== Luke Daniels series (with Grant Blackwood) ===
- The 9th Man (2023)
- Red Star Falling (2024)
- The Sorcerer's Veil (2027)

=== Standalone works ===
- The Amber Room (2003)
- The Romanov Prophecy (2004)
- The Third Secret (2005)
- The Columbus Affair (2012)
- The Omega Factor (2022)
- The List (2025)

==== Short stories ====
- The Devil's Gold (2011)
