= ATKV Prose Prize =

The ATKV-Prosaprys (AKTV Prose Prize) is a literary award awarded annually by the ATKV to an Afrikaans writer for a work of prose published during the previous calendar year. The prize was first awarded in 1984 to Dalene Matthee for her book Kringe in ’n bos.

== Previous winners ==
- 2024 – S.J. Naudé for Van vaders en vlugtelinge
- 2023 – Chris Karsten for Op pad na Moormansgat
- 2022 – Gerda Taljaard for Vier susters
- 2021 – Willem Anker for Skepsel
- 2020 – Harry Kalmer for In ’n land sonder voëls
- 2019 – Lodewyk G. du Plessis for Die dao van Daan van der Walt
- 2018 – Etienne van Heerden for Die wêreld van Charlie Oeng
- 2017 – Dan Sleigh for 1795
- 2016 – Debbie Loots for Split
- 2015 – Francois Smith for Kamphoer
- 2014 – Chris Karsten for ’n Man van min belang
- 2013 – Karin Brynard for Onse vaders
- 2012 – Dan Sleigh for Wals met Matilda
- 2011 – Chris Karsten for Abel se ontwaking
- 2010 – Eben Venter for Santa Gamka
- 2009 – P.G. du Plessis for Fees van die ongenooides
- 2008 – Chris Karsten for Frats
- 2007 – Marita van der Vyver for Stiltetyd
- 2006 – Etienne van Heerden for In stede van die liefde
- 2005 - Deon Meyer for Infanta
- 2004 - Marzanne Leroux-Van der Boon for Granate bloei in Jerusalem
- 2003 – Deon Meyer for Proteus
- 2002 - Erika Murray-Theron for Sê Maria
- 2001 – Deon Meyer for Orion
- 2000 – George Weideman for Draaijakkals
- 1999 – Berna Ackerman for Liesbet Delport se Oorlogboek
- 1998 – Annelie Botes for Klawervier
- 1997 – Etienne van Heerden for Kikoejoe
- 1996 – Dalene Matthee for Susters van Eva
- 1995 - Johnita le Roux for Die dagstêrwals
- 1994 – Etienne van Heerden for Die stoetmeester
- 1993 – Marita van der Vyver for Griet skryf ‘n sprokie
- 1992 - Corlia Fourie for Liefde en geweld
- 1991 – Riana Scheepers for Die ding in die vuur
- 1990 – Jan van Tonder for Die kind
- 1989 – Etienne van Heerden for Liegfabriek
- 1988 – Dalene Matthee for Moerbeibos
- 1987 – Etienne van Heerden for Toorberg
- 1986 – Dalene Matthee for Fiela se kind
- 1985 – Dalene Matthee for Kringe in ’n bos
