= List of South African literary awards =

A literary award or literary prize is an award presented in recognition of a particularly lauded literary piece or body of work. It is normally presented to an author. This is a list of notable literary awards awarded in South Africa.

== Alphabetically ==
=== A ===
- Adelaide Tambo Award for Human Rights in the Arts
- Alba Bouwer Prize
- Amstel Playwright of the Year Award
- ATKV Prose Prize

=== C ===
- C.P. Hoogenhout Award
- Central News Agency Literary Award

=== D ===
- David Higham Prize for Fiction
- Dinaane Debut Fiction Award

=== E ===
- Eugène Marais Prize
- Exclusive Books Boeke Prize

=== F ===
- Percy FitzPatrick Award

=== G ===
- Gerald Kraak Anthology and Prize

=== H ===
- Hertzog Prize

=== I ===
- Ingrid Jonker Prize

=== M ===
- M-Net Literary Awards
- Maskew Miller Longman Literature Awards
- Mbokodo Award
- Media24 Books Literary Awards

=== O ===
- Olive Schreiner Prize

=== S ===
- Sol Plaatje Prize for Translation
- Sol Plaatje European Union Poetry Award
- South African Literary Awards
- Sunday Times CNA Literary Awards – a suite of prizes given annually by wRite associates and the South African Dept of Arts and Culture

=== T ===
- The Cape Tercentenary Foundation
- Thomas Pringle Award

=== U ===
- University of Johannesburg Prize

== See also ==
- List of literary awards#South African literature
