= Paul Emmanuel (artist) =

South African artist

Paul Emmanuel is a South African artist best known for his prints, drawings and installations. Emmanuel graduated from the University of the Witwatersrand, Johannesburg in 1994, with a BA Fine Art. In 2024, he graduated with a Master’s degree in Fine Arts from the Maryland Institute College of Art, Baltimore, USA. Emmanuel currently lives and works in Johannesburg.

== Early life ==
Paul Emmanuel was born in Kabwe, Zambia in 1969 to South African parents, Joy Erasmus (born 1930), and Emile Emmanuel (born 1924). Emmanuel's father, Emile was born in South Africa, but spent a part of his childhood growing up in Qartaba, Lebanon, where his parents were from and was a life-long devoted Lebanese Maronite Catholic. The family moved from Zambia to Johannesburg in 1973.

== Artwork ==
=== Artistic practice ===
Paul Emmanuel is an artist and printmaker who employs various media including photography and film, to address issues of identity, particularly as a white male living in post-apartheid South Africa. The content of his oeuvre deals with a construct of gender, memory and loss. Emmanuel was professionally trained as a printmaker, specialising in lithography. Emmanuel employs his perceptual and technical skills to create photo-realistic drawings. In his drawings he employs a technique using a blade to scratch into the surface of exposed photographic paper and removes layers of the surface revealing tones in the paper in his drawing. His approach is from dark to light. Emmanuel has produced an award-winning, non-narrative, experimental film artwork.

=== Major projects ===
==== Transitions ====
Transitions is the artist's project comprising an internationally touring museum exhibition of drawings and a short film (3SAI: A Rite of Passage). As well as suite of hand-printed stone lithographs titled "Transitions Multiples" exhibited in 2011 at Goya Contemporary Gallery, Baltimore and as the featured exhibition on the 2011 FNB Joburg Art Fair. Transitions explores liminal moments in shifting white male identity, memory and loss.

The Transitions Project comprises the following three elements:

1. Transitions – an internationally touring museum solo exhibition comprising a series of five original drawings obsessively hand incised into exposed & processed photographic paper – each capturing sequences of transitory life stages. Included in the show is a looped projection of the short film 3SAI: A Rite of Passage.
2. 3SAI: A RRite of Passage – a cross-platform, cinematic non-narrative experimental short film
3. Transitions Multiples – a suite of editioned maniere noir lithographs.

==== The Lost Men ====
'The Lost Men' is an ongoing project comprising a series of temporary, site-specific installations, which engage with concepts of memorial and public grief. Emmanuel researches the history and relevance of the selected public site. The artwork he creates re-evaluates events related to South African history; it is his personal response from a contemporary viewpoint to a particular place and its historical significance. Each artwork is unique in imagery, structure and format while the project remains conceptually consistent. The installations are installed for a defined period only. Emmanuel uses his own body as his ‘canvas’ and imprints into his skin, using lead type that results in temporary bruising, the names of deceased servicemen killed in action. The artist’s marked body is photographed and the images re-printed onto large, semi-transparent silk banners which are placed in the landscape, acting as a ‘counter memorial’. It is a non-partisan, ‘counter-memorial’ that reflects on impermanence and forgetting. The Lost Men has been selected by the government of France as an official exhibit of the World War One Centennial.

The phases of 'The Lost Men' project implemented during 2004–2014 are:
phase 1: The Lost Men Grahamstown, South Africa (2004)
phase 2: The Lost Men Mozambique (2007)
phase 3: The Lost Men France (2014)

== Solo exhibitions and public installations ==
Paul Emmanuel’s first solo exhibition was in 2000, titled 'Pages from Cathexis' at the Open Window Contemporary Art Gallery (rebranded to the Now Open Window Gallery) in Pretoria. The exhibition included lithographs, etchings and an artist's book. The exhibition had an extended display of lithographic and etching equipment. Printmaking workshops were also held in the gallery and were supported by the National Arts Council of South Africa. Recent solo exhibitions include Emmanuel's 'Substance of Shadows' (2021) at the University of Johannesburg Art Gallery, South Africa, 'Men and Monuments (2020) at the Wits Art Museum, Johannesburg, South Africa and 'Remnants' (2016) at Gallery 808, Boston University Galleries, Massachusetts, USA, 'The Lost Men France' (2014) site specific installation at the Thiepval Memorial France, 'Transitions Multiples' (2011) exhibited at the Goya Contemporary Gallery, Baltimore, USA and at the FNB Joburg Art Fair, where Emmanuel was selected as the featured artist in the same year. Other key national and international solo exhibitions include 'Transitions' (2010), exhibited at the Smithsonian National Museum of African Art in Washington, D.C., 'The Lost Men Mozambique' (2007) on the Catembe Ferry Jetty, Maputo, Mozambique, 'After Image' (2005) at University of Stellenbosch Art Gallery and 'The Lost Men Grahamstown' (2004) exhibited at the National Arts Festival in Grahamstown.

== Group exhibitions ==
Emmanuel has also been included in group shows throughout South Africa as well as internationally. His most recent group exhibitions include 'Rethinking Kakotopia' (2017) at the University of Johannesburg Art Gallery, South Africa,'Doing Hair' (2014) at the Wits Art Museum in Johannesburg, South Africa., "Touch me" at France South Africa Seasons 2012 to 2013 and 'The Art of Banking: Celebrating through Collections' (2012) at the Standard Bank Art Gallery in Johannesburg.

== Film screenings and awards ==
'3SAI: A Rite of Passage' has been selected and screened at 14 film festivals internationally. This cross-platform, cinematic non-narrative experimental short film has won several awards and nominations. 3SAI was nominated for the best experimental short film in 2011 at the 9th In the Palace International Short Film Festival in Balchik, Bulgaria, won best Experimental Film at the Sardinia Film Festival in Italy in 2010 and in 2009 won best short film at the 4th Africa-in-Motion Short Film Festival Competition.

== Awards and fellowships ==
Paul Emmanuel has been awarded the following key awards and fellowships among others. In 1997 The Ampersand Foundation named Emmanuel the first recipient of the prestigious Ampersand Fellowship for its New York Residency and in 2008 Emmanuel won the Sasol Wax in Art Competition in South Africa. Emmanuel was selected as Featured Artist exhibiting his solo exhibition TRANSITIONS MULTIPLES at the FNB Jo’burg Art Fair in 2011 and was awarded the Visas Pour la Creation research residency in Paris, France in 2011 by the Institut Français.

From 2022 to 2025, he served as a Fulbright Scholar in the United States and in 2025, he was bestowed with an honorary Doctor of Fine Arts degree (honoris causa) by the Montserrat College of Art, Boston.

== Essays ==
Paul Emmanuels' artistic practice and projects have been the topic of many essays and journal articles. These include Dominic Thorburn's Borderline, Sweeping a Mind Field, Prof. Emerita's, Pamela Allara, Diane Victor and Paul Emmanuel: Lost Men Lost Wor(l)ds- Gender and South African Art in African Arts, Pamela Allara, Paul Emmanuel’s Transitions: The White South African Male in Process, Irene Enslé Bronner, Intimate Masculinities in the Work of Paul Emmanuel, Robyn Sassen, Under Covers: South Africa’s Apartheid Army – an Incubator for Artists’ Books, Julia Charlton, Drawing out of the Darkness and Karen von Veh, The Politics of Memory in South African Art.

== Publications ==
- Karen von Veh, Annette Becker and Pamela Allara, Paul Emmanuel - Wits Art Museum
- Annette Becker, Voir La Grande Guerre, Un Autre Recit, 1914–2014.
- 2014 Centenaire De La: Premiere Guerre Mondiale. Page 54.
- Julia Charlton, after-image
- André Croucamp, Robyn Sassen, Art Source South Africa - Transitions
