= Paul Emmanuel =

Paul Emmanuel may refer to:

- Emmanuel Paulker (born 1955), Nigerian politician
- Paul Emmanuel (artist) (born 1969), South African artist
