= Elana Brundyn =

Fine art and cultural consultant

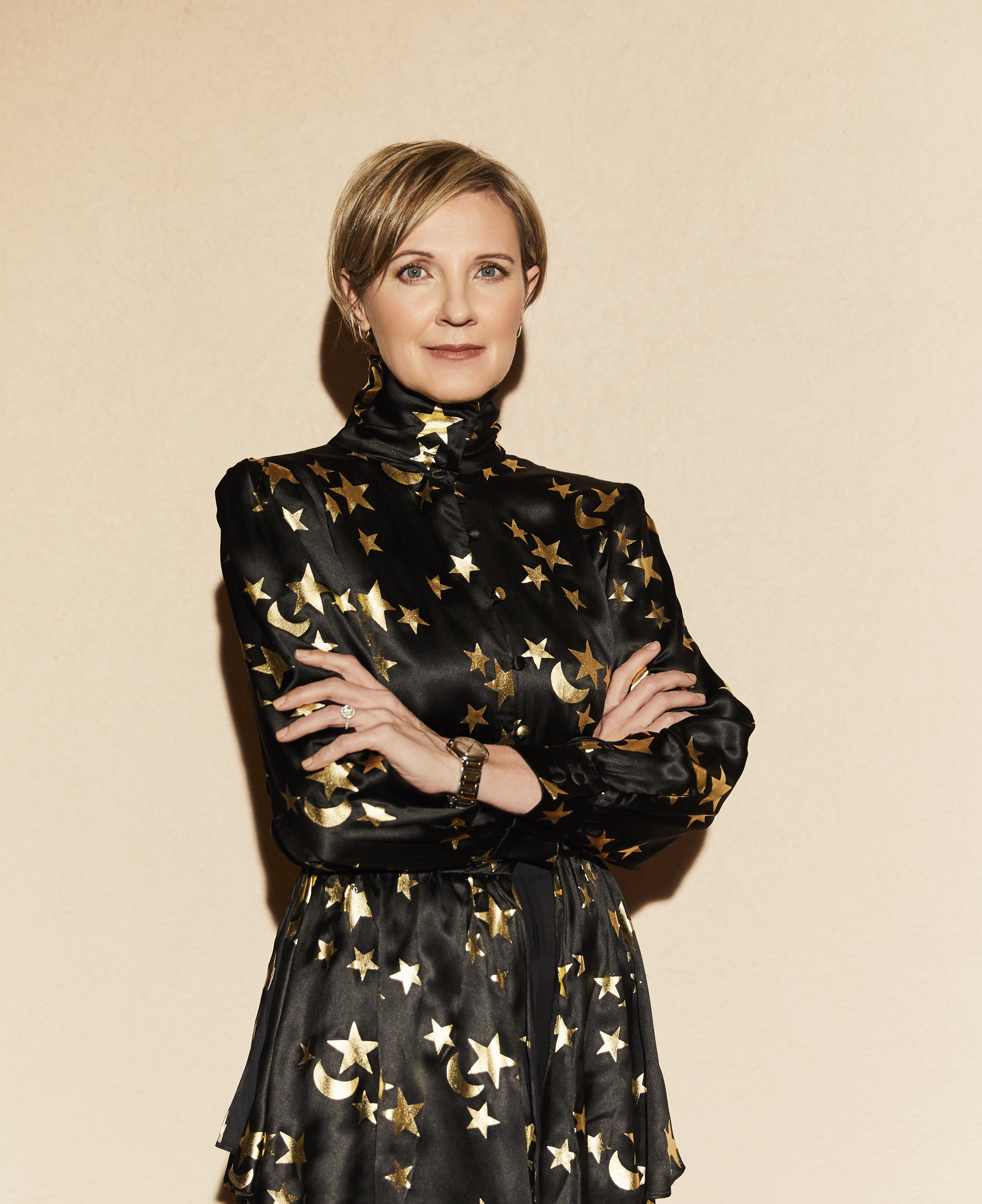
- Spouse: Pieter Brundyn (married 1993)
- Children: 2
- Website: www.brundyn.com

Elana Brundyn is a fine art and cultural consultant based in Cape Town, South Africa. She has previously worked as a commercial gallerist and a museum director.

Brundyn was involved in launching two important African museums – she was the founding CEO of Norval Foundation and an inaugural director at Zeitz MOCAA. During her time at Norval Foundation, she helped establish a formal art partnership with Boschendal which resulted in the launch of satellite art exhibitions hosted on the farms’ historic manor house with a focus on artists from across Africa.

Currently, Brundyn sits on the board of trustees for Aspire Art, the Stellenbosch Outdoor Sculpture Trust, In Residence Foundation and the Standard Bank Visual Arts Committee.

She is also the founder of the Art House Collection. She was previously an advisory trustee of the Harvard Centre for African Studies board and the Gerard Sekoto Foundation.

== Career ==
Elana Brundyn has worked as a professional in the commercial and nonprofit cultural sector of South Africa for more than two decades.

=== Brundyn Arts and Culture (2023 - ) ===
In 2023, Elana Brundyn founded Brundyn Arts and Culture, a company that focuses on museum development and strategy, collection building, art education, and philanthropic initiatives. The consultancy also has an exhibition space in the Cape Town CBD. The launch of Brundyn Arts and Culture coincided with the opening of Lebohang Kganye’s solo exhibition, Mmoloki wa mehopolo: Breaking Bread with a Wanderer in Cape Town. The show traveled to Boschendal, a satellite gallery space in the Cape Winelands which Brundyn developed during her directorship at the Norval Foundation. The exhibition was presented alongside The Sea is History, consisting of four large-scale pop-up sculptures. In 2024, Kganye won the Deutsche Börse Photography Foundation Prize.

She launched two exhibition venues (one in Cape Town, another in the Winelands at Boschendal) and curated major exhibitions such as Lebohang Kganye: Mmoloki wa Mehopolo: Breaking Bread with a Wanderer and The Sea is History. BA&C has also engaged in high-profile consultancy projects including the Standard Bank Art Lab in Sandton.

She also contributes to long-term programmes such as the Standard Bank Visual Arts Committee (2024–present), the Hemelhuijs × Brundyn Art Programme (2023–2024), and the digital-first exhibition initiative Goya and Africa, developed with the Athena Art Foundation (2023–present).

Brundyn's fundraising and event leadership spans several cultural institutions. She has supported the Cape Philharmonic Orchestra's annual “Take a Seat” campaign (March 2025), hosted major events for the STILL Art Residency and the Zeitz MOCAA VIP Gala during Cape Town Art Week (February 2024), facilitated the Lalela Fundraiser Lunch and Silent Auction (February 2023), and served as an official consultant to the Zeitz MOCAA Gala “Art and Opulence,” supported by Gucci initiatives (November 2022).

She has also taken on a partnership with the Montreux Jazz Festival Franschhoek (MJFSA), deploying her expertise in visual art curation to integrate arts programming with live music, cultural experience design and audience development within the festival's African debut edition.

In addition to these initiatives, Brundyn Arts and Culture consulted with Standard Bank on the launch of the Standard Bank Art Lab. Brundyn has also been active as an international speaker, with recent engagements including the Standard Bank Go Beyond Launch in Johannesburg (2 September 2025), the INTERMUSEUM Conference in Moscow in May 2025 and We Are Africa (May 2023), where she spoke on the shift from transactional to transformational brand experiences through art.

=== 2017–2022: Norval Foundation ===
From November 2017 to February 2022, Elana Brundyn served as the founding chief executive officer of the Norval Foundation in Cape Town, where she led the establishment and strategic development of one of Africa's most significant contemporary art institutions. Working with a curatorial team that included Karel Nel, Dr Portia Malatjie, Khanya Mashabela, Khanyisile Mbongwa, Kyle Shepherd, Liese van der Watt and Owen Martin, she oversaw 23 exhibitions. Highlights included Accomplice by Michael Armitage, Heliostat by Wim Botha, Why Should I Hesitate? by William Kentridge, and Alpha and Omega by Jackson Hlungwani.

Brundyn played a key role in developing the Sculpture Garden, which grew to include 21 major installations, notably securing Yinka Shonibare CBE's Wind Sculpture SG III (2019) — the only monumental Shonibare sculpture on the African continent. She also launched The Collector Focus, a programme of curated exhibitions and talks that highlighted the role of collectors in shaping cultural value and sustaining artistic ecosystems.

=== Zeitz MOCAA (2015-2017) ===
As the Director of Institutional Development and External Affairs at Zeitz MOCAA Elana Brundyn was part was part of a small team that helped launch the Zeitz MOCAA in September 2017. She was responsible for creating a long-term fundraising strategy for the museum through partnerships, sponsorships, membership programmes and organising special events like the Christies Auction, the Preview Weekend and the Grand Public Opening.

=== February 2022 – Present: Brundyn Arts and Culture & Art House Collection ===
Elana is the founder and CEO of Brundyn Arts and Culture, an art consultancy focused on promoting contemporary African art.

In February 2022, She co-founded Art House Collection, a short-term residential property rental company that highlights homes with a design focus, integrating luxury accommodation, purpose-driven travel, and contemporary art experiences. Through these ventures, she connects guests with artists, collections, and the broader South African cultural landscape.

== Projects and publications ==
Brundyn oversees a broad portfolio of cultural, educational, and research-driven initiatives. Her recent publishing work includes the BACkids series, an educational programme introducing children to art, auctions, and visual culture. This includes BACkids Vol. I (April 2024), Vol. II (September 2024), and Vol. III (February 2025), as well as an educational worksheet released in February 2024 to accompany Lebohang Kganye's exhibition at Boschendal. An upcoming children's book, Cultural Explorers: Lift Your Padel, extends this outreach into art-auction literacy for young readers.

Brundyn is a trustee of The Stellenbosch Outdoor Sculpture Trust which has launched hosted two triennials (2022 & 2025).

== Awards and recognitions ==
Brundyn's work in contemporary art and cultural leadership has earned significant recognition. In 2020, she received a Special Commendation from the Sotheby's Prize for the exhibition Alt and Omega: Jackson Hlungwani, making the Norval Foundation the only African art institution honoured that year for curatorial excellence. Beyond formal awards, her impact is reflected in a series of major initiatives she helped establish or guide, including the Norval Sovereign African Art Prize (2022–present), the Norval x Boschendal Project (2022–2023), the subsequent Boschendal x Brundyn collaboration (2023–2025), and the Cape Town Art Book Fair (2020–present). She also oversaw notable cultural collaborations such as a dance film with the Cape Town City Ballet (2020), a GUCCI-supported cultural event (2019), and long-running programmes at the Norval Foundation, including the Artist Edition Programme (2018–present), the Concert Programme curated by Kyle Shepherd (2018–present), and the Foundation's Opening Gala Garden Party in 2018.
