= Harry Kalmer =

South African novelist, essayist, and playwright (1956–2019)

Harold (Harry) Kalmer
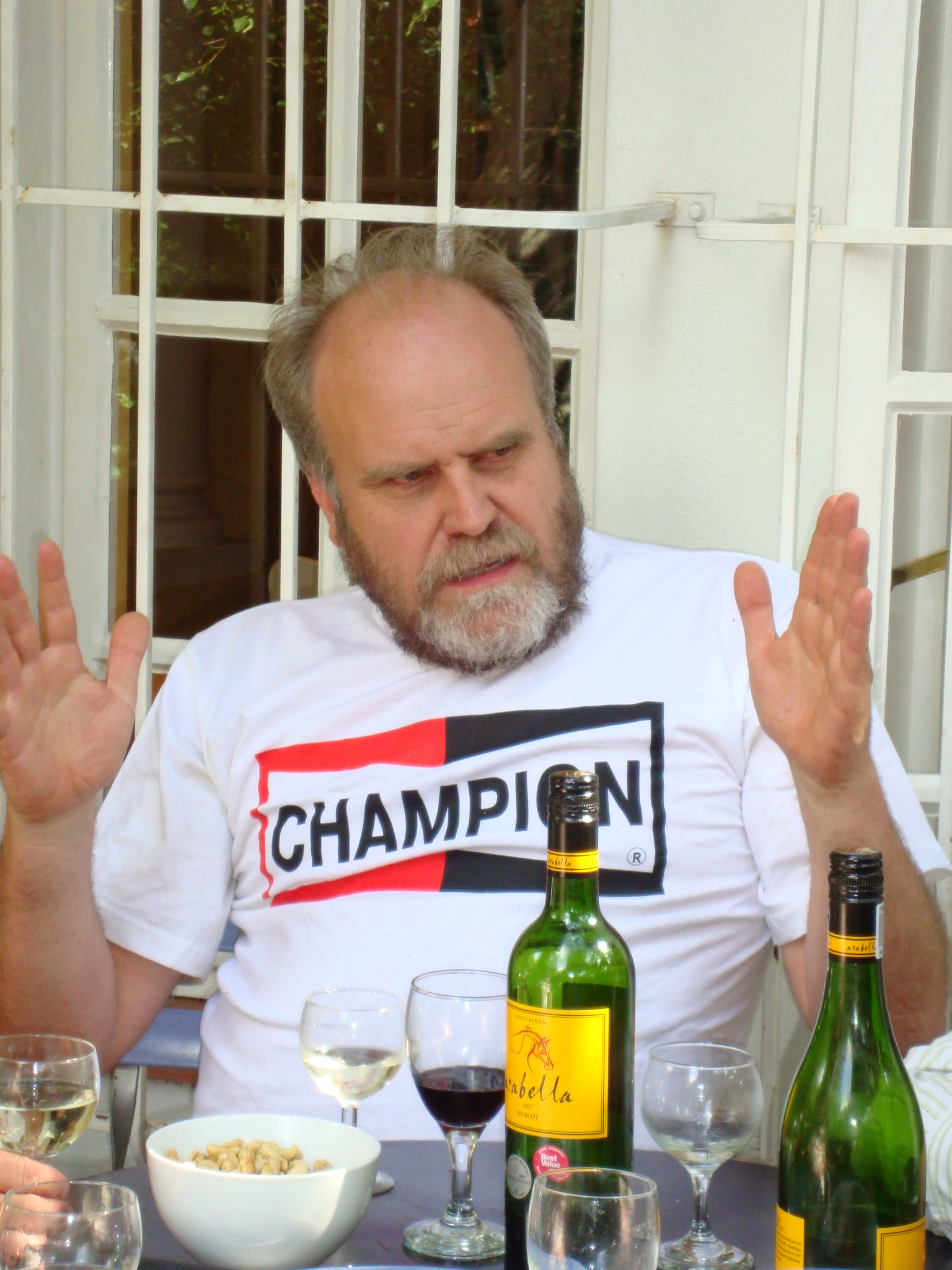
- Harry Kalmer at Boekehuis bookshop in Auckland Park, Johannesburg, 13 December 2008
- Born: 21 November 1956; Bellville, Western Cape, Union of South Africa
- Died: 26 July 2019 (aged 62)
- Education: University of Pretoria, University of Stellenbosch
- Occupation: Writer
- Spouse: Sanpat Hattingh
- Children: 1 son, 1 daughter

Harold (Harry) Kalmer (21 November 1956 – 26 July 2019) was a South African novelist, essayist and playwright both in English and his home language Afrikaans.

== Life and work ==
Harry Kalmer was born in Bellville as fourth child of Kenneth Kalmer and Johanna Steyn; the family soon moved to Johannesburg where Harry completed his schooling before achieving his B.A. in Afrikaans-Nederlands and Drama at the University of Pretoria. From 1980-81 he was conscripted into the SADF and deployed as a lieutenant in Namibia; given the context of Namibia's war for independence, this was a formative period for some of his later creative work; he came to be classified as one of the Tagtigers, an anti-apartheid Afrikaans literary clique and was socially connected with Voëlvry, a loose but influential grouping of dissident performers usually characterised as Afrikaners but including a member classified as "coloured" and an English-speaker (albeit a thoroughly bilingual one).

In 1983 Kalmer married Sanpat Hattingh, a fashion designer. For the rest of the 1980s they lived in Yeoville, which was then a "transgressive space"; in the 1990s they moved to neighboring Observatory and had two children, Daniël and Jana. From 1991 Kalmer left his job in advertising to be a freelance writer; in 2010 he registered at the University of Stellenbosch for an M.A. in creative writing, which he obtained in 2014. His death in 2019 at age 62 came after a short struggle against cancer.

== Writings ==
Kalmer had eight books published (as well as contributing short stories/chapters to several published collections including a posthumous one), and around twenty plays staged. He also won many prizes for advertising copy.

Kalmer's first play to be staged was Bloed in die strate (176 interviews for television) (1984 - in which year he also wrote Piet Joubert and the Boer War Show and Die val van Pretoria, dramas which were both shortlisted for awards), followed by Hartland (1986), Die oë van hulle wit (1988) and then in 1989 both Antjie Somers and I and Kalmer's first book Die waarheid en ander stories, a collection of short stories. In 1991 his next play was staged, Watercolour days, and in 1992, another play, They say heaven is like TV. Also in 1992, Kalmer ventured into new territory, directing his own first cabaret, The secret of my excess, performed by Lynn Joffe.

These were followed in 1993 by X-Ray Visagie en die Vingers van God, a novel, in 1995 by the play Frida Kahlo’s eyes, and in 1996 by the play Sleeping with Alice. Kalmer went on to adapt for stage the novel Die dinge van 'n kind by Marita van der Vyver (1998) and in the same year wrote Die man met die dertien kinders, a novella which was also dramatised for radio.

Kniediep (1999) is another novel; Briewe aan 'n rooi dak (2002) was initially a dramatic monologue, later filmed, broadcast and distributed on DVD. Its narrative was later to become the first part of En die lekkerste deel van dood wees (2007), a novel of which the second part was staged as Wolke (2007). Meanwhile, Kalmer had written and staged Die Bitterbek Blues of Ben (Die Breker) Baartman(2002), Oor die berge (2004), Wie is Spek Harmse en waarom skryf hy Afrikaanse advertensies? (2004), Die vloek van die strandjutwolf (2004) and Meneer de Beer (2005), as well as published Groceries – 56 stories oor huishoudelike produkte(2006), a collection of stories about household products.

In 2009 Kalmer's play Die vloek van die strandjutwolf was staged; he also wrote Unwined which was not. Around this time he contributed scripts to TV series such as Isidingo, Binnelanders and Diver down. He had a column Vlieger in the Rapport newspaper which was so popular that he eventually based a play on it, Vlieger Unplugged (2011). Kalmer's last play, Die Bram Fischer wals (2012, performed in English in 2013 as The Bram Fischer Waltz) was his most political work and won the Adelaide Tambo prize for human rights in the arts.

His 2019 book In ’n land sonder voëls was posthumously awarded the 2020 ATKV Prose Prize.

== Works ==
=== Plays ===
- Bloed in die strate (176 interviews for television) (1984)
- Hartland/Hardland (1986)
- Die oë van hulle wit (1988)
- Antjie Somers and I (1989)
- Watercolour Days (1991)
- They say Heaven is Like TV (1992)
- The Secret of My Excess (1992)
- Frida Kahlo’s Eyes (1995)
- Sleeping with Alice (1996)
- Die dinge van ‘n kind (1998)
- Die man met die dertien kinders (1999)
- The Bitterbek Blues of Ben (die Breker) Bartman (2001)
- Briewe aan ‘n rooi dak (2001)
- Paradysweg (2002)
- 25 vrouens (2002)
- Oor die berge (2004)
- Wie is Spek Harmse en hoekom skryf hy Afrikaanse advertensies? (2004)
- Meneer de Beer (2005)
- Die vloek van die Strandjutwolf (2006)
- Wolke (translated) (2007)
- Parkamampoer (2009)
- Vlieger Unplugged (2011)
- Die Bram Fischer Wals (2012)
- The Bram Fischer Waltz (2013)
- Weg (2017)

=== Books ===
- Die waarheid en ander stories (Taurus) (short stories) (1989)
- X-Ray visagie en die vingers van God (Tafelberg) (1993)
- Die man met die dertien kinders (Queillerie) (1998)
- Kniediep (Human and Rousseau) (1998)
- Briewe aan ‘n rooi dak (Handmade book) (2005)
- Groceries: 56 Stories oor huishoudelike produkte (Lapa) (short stories) (2006)
- En die lekkerste deel van dood wees (Tafelberg) (2007)
- Vlieger en die gevare van die close dance (Queillerie) (short stories) (2012)
- ’n Duisend stories oor Johannesburg (Queillerie) (2014)
- A Thousand Tales of Johannesburg (Penguin) (2017)
- Die agste plaag (Handmade Book) (2019)
- In ’n land sonder voëls (Penguin) (2019)

=== Anthologies and other (contributor) ===
- Forces Favourites – A collection of anti-conscription stories and poems (Taurus) (1986)
- Vuurslag – an anthology of Afrikaans flash fiction (Tafelberg) (1990)
- Eeu – one hundred years of Afrikaans short stories (Tafelberg) (1996)
- Vonkfiksie – 46 award-winning Afrikaans short-short stories (Human & Rousseau) (1998)
- Die groot Afrikaanse kortverhaalboek (Tafelberg) (2004)
- Alles goed en wel – A selection of humorous Afrikaans short stories (Lapa) (2007)
- Meer Krag – An Afrikaans reader for first language high school learners (Oxford University Press) (2008)
- Sussie Veer is dood en ander verhale (Maskew Miller Longman) (2009)
- Donker Plekke – crime fiction anthology (Lapa) (2011)
- Die Afrikaanse skryfgids (Penguin) (2012)
- Ponte City (edited by Ivan Vladislavic) (Steidl Verlag) (2014)
- Public Intimacy: Art and Other Ordinary Acts in South Africa (Yerba Buena Center for the Arts San Francisco) (2015)
- Koshuis (edited by Erns Grundling) (Queillerie) (2016)

== Awards ==
- Adelaide Tambo Award for Human Rights in the Arts for The Bram Fischer Waltz (2014)
- Sunday Times Literary Award for A Thousand Tales of Johannesburg (2018)
- ATKV Prose Prize for In ’n land sonder voëls
