= Circles in a Forest (novel) =

1984 novel by Dalene Matthee

- Author: Dalene Matthee
- Language: Afrikaans
- Publication date: 1984
- Publication place: South Africa
- Pages: 305
- ISBN: 9780394539119
- Followed by: Fiela's Child

Circles in a Forest is a novel by Dalene Matthee, originally written and published in Afrikaans as Kringe in 'n Bos in 1984. It is the first book in her series of four "forest novels", set in the Knysna forest. The other three "forest novels" are Fiela se Kind (Fiela’s Child) published in 1985, Moerbeibos (The Mulberry Forest) published in 1987 and Toorbos (Dreamforest, later translated as Karoelina’s Forest) published in 2003. Circles in a Forest became a best-seller and has been translated into English, Portuguese, Dutch, French, Icelandic, Spanish, Hebrew, German, Swedish, Italian, Finnish and Norwegian. The novel is a coming-of-age story about an Afrikaans woodcutter named Saul Barnard, set in and around the South African town of Knysna in the nineteenth century, focusing on the impact of a gold rush on the Outeniqua forest, its Afrikaans and Khoekhoe residents and the Knysna elephants.

== Film ==
The story was made into an English film Circles in a Forest in 1989.
