= National Youth Jazz Festival =

Coordinates: 33°18′36″S 26°31′36″E

The National Youth Jazz Festival runs as part of the National Arts Festival also known as the Grahamstown Festival which has been running in Grahamstown since 1974, and is the world's second-largest single cultural festival, attracting performers in all art forms from around South Africa and all over the world.

It attracts a heterogeneous audience of over 140,000 from around the country, who cram into what is normally a small settler town best known for its academic and legal institutions. Performance venues are thus created in any available venue such as schools, churches, and community halls. The National Youth Jazz Festival takes place on the campus of the Diocesan School for Girls, Grahamstown.

== History ==
The National Youth Jazz Festival has been in existence since 1991; the Jazz Festival has been running since 1989, and the two festivals now run as a single entity, organized by the same administrative team.

The Standard Bank Jazz Festival runs for the full 10 days of the National Arts Festival in a variety of jazz styles. The festival incorporates the Standard Bank National Youth Jazz Festival for the first six days to bring together more than three hundred young jazz musicians, thirty-five jazz educators, and eighty jazz performers from around the world.

== Intention ==
The festival intends to develop South African jazz by:

1. providing educational opportunities for young players.
2. encouraging artistic integrity and creativity on the Main Stage.
3. Creating a forum for South African musicians to network with peers from around the country and with foreign musicians.
4. providing audiences with interesting, quality jazz.

The festival lasts nearly a week, incorporating jazz performances, rehearsals, workshops, lectures, networking, and an opportunity for South Africa's future jazz stars to interact personally and musically with their peers and other performers.

The festival has hosted many of South Africa's leading jazz musicians over the past 16 years, as well as musicians and teachers from Argentina, Australia, Austria, Britain, Canada, Costa Rica, Denmark, Finland, France, Germany, Israel, Mexico, Mozambique, Netherlands, Norway, Portugal, Serbia, Sweden, Switzerland, United States, and Zimbabwe.

South African jazz students audition for places in the Standard Bank National Schools Big Band and the National Youth Jazz Band (NYJB). The NYJB performs regularly at festivals around South Africa—Grahamstown, Cape Town, Johannesburg, Durban—and has performed in New York City, Sweden and the North Sea Jazz Festival, the Netherlands.
