= Chris Karsten =

South African journalist and writer

Chris Karsten (born 9 November 1947) is a South African journalist and writer writing in Afrikaans who has received numerous awards for his writing.

== Life and work ==
Chris Karsten was born on 9 November 1947 in Morgenzon in Mpumalanga. He matriculated from the Hoërskool Hoogenhout in Bethal. Afterwards, he studied further at the University of Pretoria and in 1970 earned a B.A with Afrikaans-Dutch and psychology as majors. In 1971 he began his career as a journalist for Die Volksblad in Bloemfontein. With the support of Beeld in 1974 he moved to Johannesburg. He returned to Die Volksblad as editor and was also the representative for Nasionale Koerante in Zimbabwe, head of Die Volksblad newspaper and parliamentary reporter. Later he became news editor and member of the newspaper's editorial team. He moved to George, where he served as bureau-head for Rapport. He married Simone, who was born in Canada and came to South Africa as a child. In 2010 they decided to emigrate to the land of her birth, and settled in the small fishing village Lunenburg in Nova Scotia. They have three sons, Christoff, Eric and Udo. Christoff died at the age of twenty in a car accident.

== Writing ==
Numerous of his short stories appeared in magazines before he published his first book, the children's story Floris Sapiens. The title of the book is derived from the Florisbad excavation site in the Free State. The book is science-fiction and covers a group of prehistoric children. Floris and his friend Saldanna refuse to blindly follow tradition and go on an adventure to experience new things. In 1985 he was awarded the Sanlam Prize (Silwer) for Children's Literature for Floris Sapiens. Die jokkie wat met perde kon praat was also aimed at children and is the story of a black boy, Letsie, who is unable to speak and is taken in by a white family, the parents of the narrator Billy. Although unable to speak, Letsie is excellent at horseriding and can speak telepathically with horses.

Following this, he focused on work for adults. "Frats" is a novel about Khoena, based on the life of Saartjie Baartman. In 2008 "Frats" won the ATKV Prose Prize. After this, Karsten switched to crime fiction. "Seisoen van sonde" is about a serial killer. The book won an ATKV prize in 2010, and was also on the shortlist for an M-Net prize.

Year	Publications
	Fiction
1985	Floris Sapiens
1997	Die jokkie wat met perde kon praat
2007	Frats
2009	Seisoen van sonde
2010	Abel se ontwaking
2011	Abel se lot
2012	Die afreis van Abel Lotz
2013	’n Man van min belang
2014	Die respektabele meneer Hartslief
2015	Die verdwyning van Billy Katz
	Non-fiction
2007	Dodelike vroue: Wanneer passie in bloed eindig
	Opspraak deur moord: Suid-Afrikaanse doodslag skok
	Riller in die raaisel: Onopgeloste Suid-Afrikaanse misdade (ISBN 978-0-7981-4718-7)
	Verlore onskuld: Suid-Afrikaanse kinders wat moor en roof
2008	Boos en bisar
	Suid-Afrikaanse geweldenaars sonder genade
2009	Charlize: Ek leef my droom
2007	Unsolved : No Answers to Heinous South African crimes (ISBN 978-0-7981-4843-6)

== Awards ==
- 2008 – ATKV Prose Prize for Frats
- 2011 – ATKV Prose Prize for Abel se ontwaking
- 2014 – ATKV Prose Prize for ’n Man van min belang

== Sources ==
=== Books ===
- Wybenga, Gretel en Snyman, Maritha (reds.) "Van Patrys-hulle tot Hanna Hoekom" Lapa-Uitgewers Eerste uitgawe Tweede druk 2005

=== Magazines and newspapers ===
- Coetzee, Corné "Mozart vir mooi, Liszt vir moord" “Plus" 15 October 2009
- Ferrus, Diana "Rapport" 2 September 2007
- Malan, Marlene "Abel Lotz moor weer" “Rapport" 30 March 2014
- Nieuwoudt, Stephanie "Joernalis skryf jeugboek met ’n verskil" “Plus" 9 December 1997
- Rautenbach, Elmari "Winterbach-manuskrip wen" “Beeld" 13 March 2012
- Retief, Hanlie "Taai soos bloed vloei ink in sy are" “Rapport" 18 March 2012

=== Internet ===
- Crime beat: http://crimebeat.bookslive.co.za/blog/2013/02/06/crime-beat-a-quiet-chat-with-chris-karsten/
- Green, Phyllis Sarie: http://www.sarie.com/lewe-liefdes/5-boekminute-met-chris-karsten/
- NB-Uitgewers: http://www.nb.co.za/authors/257
- Roberts, Maryke LitNet: http://www.litnet.co.za/onderhoud-oor-die-respektabele-meneer-hartslief-deur-chris-karsten/
- Storiewerf: http://www.storiewerf.co.za/cvs/cv_chriskarsten_ph.htm
