= Standard Bank Art Gallery =

Art gallery in Johannesburg, South Africa

Coordinates: 26°12′31.43″S 28°2′29.17″E

The Standard Bank Art Gallery is a non-commercial gallery of Standard Bank's investment in arts and culture located in Johannesburg, South Africa. Opened in 1990, the gallery was the recipient of the 2023 Experts’ Choice Award. The gallery's current head and chief curator is art historian Dr Same Mdluli who was appointed in 2018.

== Standard Bank Corporate Art Collection ==
The Standard Bank Corporate Art Collection is one of South Africa's most expansive and comprehensive collections. This collection was founded in the 1960s and includes over 1,200 works by 250 primarily South African artists.

In 1979, Standard Bank Foundation of African Art forged a partnership with the University of the Witwatersrand Art Gallery (now WITS Art Museum) with the purpose of safeguarding, preserving and promoting African art. This partnership that was initiated in by Ian MacKenzie and Professor Karl Tober.

The collection includes the work of notable artists such as:

- Berni Searle
- Cecil Edwin Frans Skotnes
- Sir Daniel Macnee (1806-1882)
- Jackson Hlungwani
- Jan De Reyniers
- Jane Alexander
- Maria Magdalena (Maggie) Laubser
- Mary Sibande
- Mohau Modisakeng
- Sabelo Mlangeni
- Walter Whall Battiss (1906 - 1982)

== Exhibitions ==
- Wegwysers deur die Blinkuur by Stephané Edith Cronje (3 September 2024 - 31 October 2024)
- Groot Gat by Lady Skollie ( 6 - 15 December 2023)
- Ntsumi ya Vutomi by Blessing Ngobeni (4 - 15 September 2023)
- IYEZA by Buhlebezwe Siwani (8 - 24 April 2023)
- Roger Ballen in Johannesburg (19 October 2022 - 31 January 2023)
- Henri Matisse: Rhythm and Meaning (2016)
- Picasso and Africa exhibition (2006)
- Joan Miro (2002)
- Marc Chagall exhibition (2000)

== Standard Bank Young Artist Award ==
The Standard Bank Young Artist Award was established in 1981 by the National Arts Festival. The visual arts component of the award includes an exhibition hosted by the Standard Bank Art Gallery.
