= Bonnie Ntshalintshali =

South African ceramicist and sculptor

- Bonnie Ntshalinthshali
- Born: 1 January 1967; Winterton, KwaZulu-Natal, South Africa
- Died: 31 December 1999 (aged 32)
- Education: University of Natal
- Known for: Ceramics

Bonnie Ntshalintshali (1 January 1967 – 31 December 1999) was a South African ceramicist and sculptor.

== Early life ==
Bonnie Mayvee Ntshalintshali was born on a farm in the Winterton district of KwaZulu-Natal in 1967. As a girl she survived polio and was considered unsuited to heavy physical farm work, so she was apprenticed to learn ceramics with Fée Halsted-Berning at Ardmore Ceramics. They first worked together in 1985. She had some further training at the University of Natal in 1990.

== Career ==
At Ardmore, Bonnie Ntshalintshali was at first an apprentice, but in time she and Halsted ran the studio more as partners. In 1988 Ntshalintshali won the Corobrik National Ceramics Award. She and Halsted were jointly named winners of a Standard Bank Young Artist Award in 1990. The catalogue for this exhibition, written by South African fine artist Andrew Verster, described Ntshalintshali's ceramics as follows: "The characters in Bonnie's work, the animals, the birds and the people are all individuals. One is attracted to them precisely because they are such powerful personalities." In 1991, she was invited to design fabric prints based on her ceramics for a festival in Grahamstown. Her ceramics were featured at the Seville Expo in 1992, at the Venice Biennale in 1993, and at the South African Bienniale in 1995. Ntashalintashali's designs often drew from Zulu folk culture or Biblical motifs. Her sister-in-law Beauty Ntshalintshali, her half-brother Vuzi Ntshalintshali, and another relative, Somandla Ntshalintshali, all joined her at Ardmore and also learned the shop's distinctive style.

== Death and legacy ==
Bonnie Ntshalintshali died in 1999, from illness related to HIV/AIDS. She was 32 years old. In her memory, the Bonnie Ntshalintshali Museum was founded in 2003, the first museum in South Africa named for a black woman artist. The museum is situated on Ardmore Farm in Caversham, KwaZulu-Natal, and contains works by Ntshalintshali as well as pieces by other Ardmore artists. A picture book biography for young readers, Bonnie Ntshalintshali: A New Way with Paint and Clay was published in 2006. Ardmore: We Are Because of Others, a book by Fée Halsted-Berning that details the history of Ardmore ceramics, and contains many details about Ntshalintshali's life and work (including images of her ceramics) was published in 2012.
