= Dalene Matthee =

South-African author (1938–2005)

- Born: Dalene Scott; 13 October 1938; Riversdale, Western Cape
- Died: 20 February 2005 (aged 66); Mossel Bay, Western Cape
- Occupation: Author
- Children: 3
- Relatives: Sir Walter Scott

Dalene Matthee (13 October 1938 – 20 February 2005) was a South African author best known for her four "Forest Novels", written in and around the Knysna Forest. Her books have been translated into fourteen languages, including English, French, German, Spanish, Italian, Hebrew and Icelandic, and over a million copies have been sold worldwide.

== Biography ==
She was born Dalena Scott in Riversdale in the then Cape Province in 1938. After graduating from the local high school in 1957, she studied music at a conservatory in Oudtshoorn as well as at the Holy Cross Convent in Graaff-Reinet.

Her first book was a children's story, Die Twaalfuurstokkie (The Twelve-o'-clock Stick), published in 1970. In 1982 a collection of short stories called Die Judasbok (The Judas Goat) was also published. Before gaining fame and wide acclaim for her first "forest novel", she also wrote stories for magazines as well as two popular novels – 'n Huis vir Nadia (A House for Nadia) (1982) and Petronella van Aarde, Burgemeester (Petronella van Aarde, Mayor) (1983).

Kringe in 'n Bos (Circles in a Forest) (1984) is a novel about the extermination of the Knysna elephants and the exploitation of the woodcutters of the Knysna Forest, and impacts on the forest elephants. It was an international success and was translated to several languages, with the author translating the book herself from Afrikaans to English. Two other highly successful "Forest Novels" followed:

Fiela se Kind (Fiela's Child) in 1985 and Moerbeibos (The Mulberry Forest) in 1987. Brug van die Esels (Bridge of the Mules) was published in 1993, followed by Susters van Eva (Sisters of Eve) in 1995, Pieternella van die Kaap (Pieternella from the Cape) in 2000 and the fourth "Forest Novel" Toorbos (Dream Forest) in 2003.

She won numerous literary prizes for her famous works, and Fiela's Child and Circles in a Forest were made into films.

After a short sickbed caused by heart failure, she died in Mossel Bay, South Africa in 2005, survived by her three daughters. Her husband, Larius, had died in 2003.

== Bibliography ==
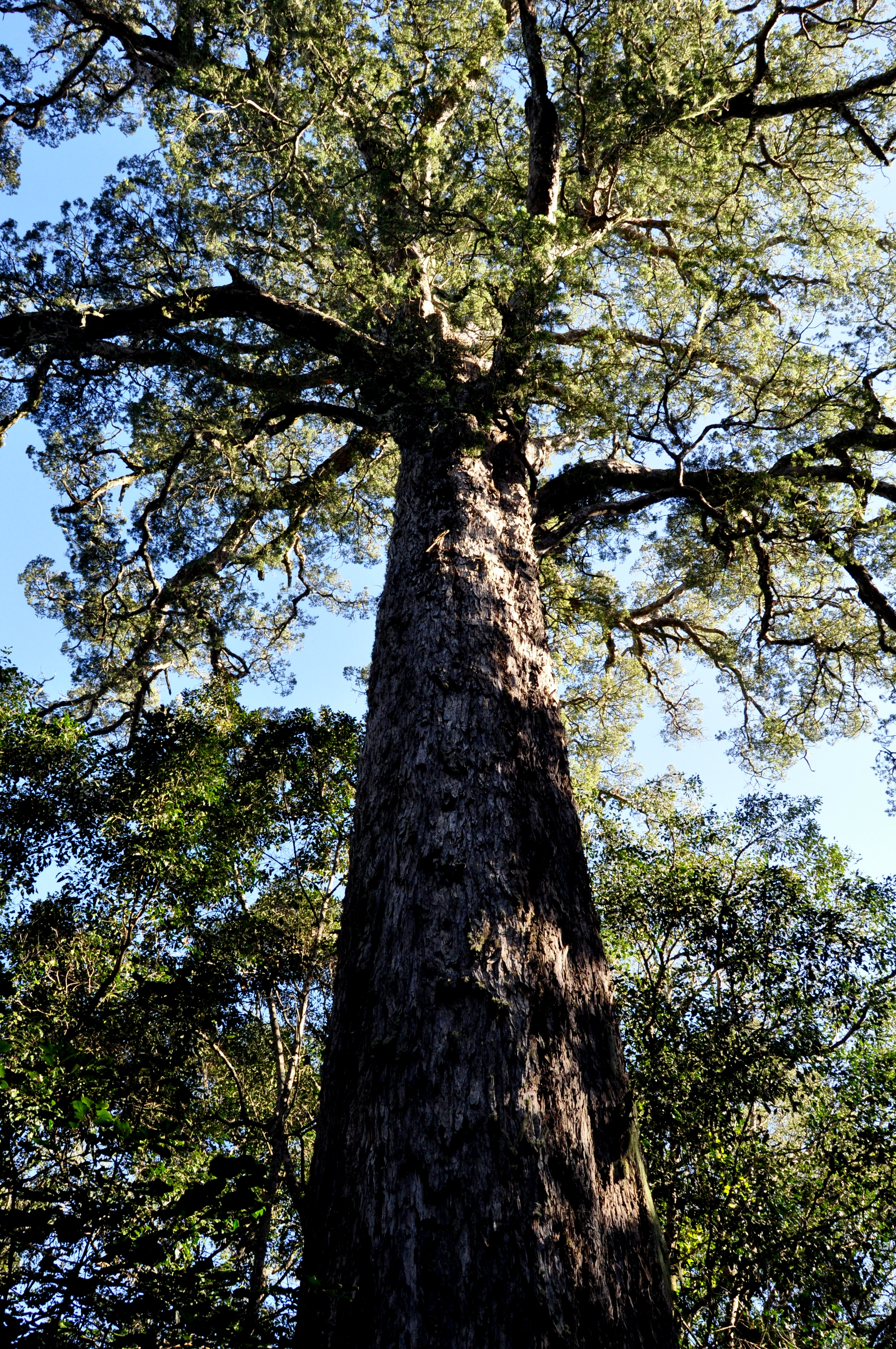
The Dalene Matthee Big Tree at Krisjan-se-Nek in the Wilderness section of the Garden Route National Park.

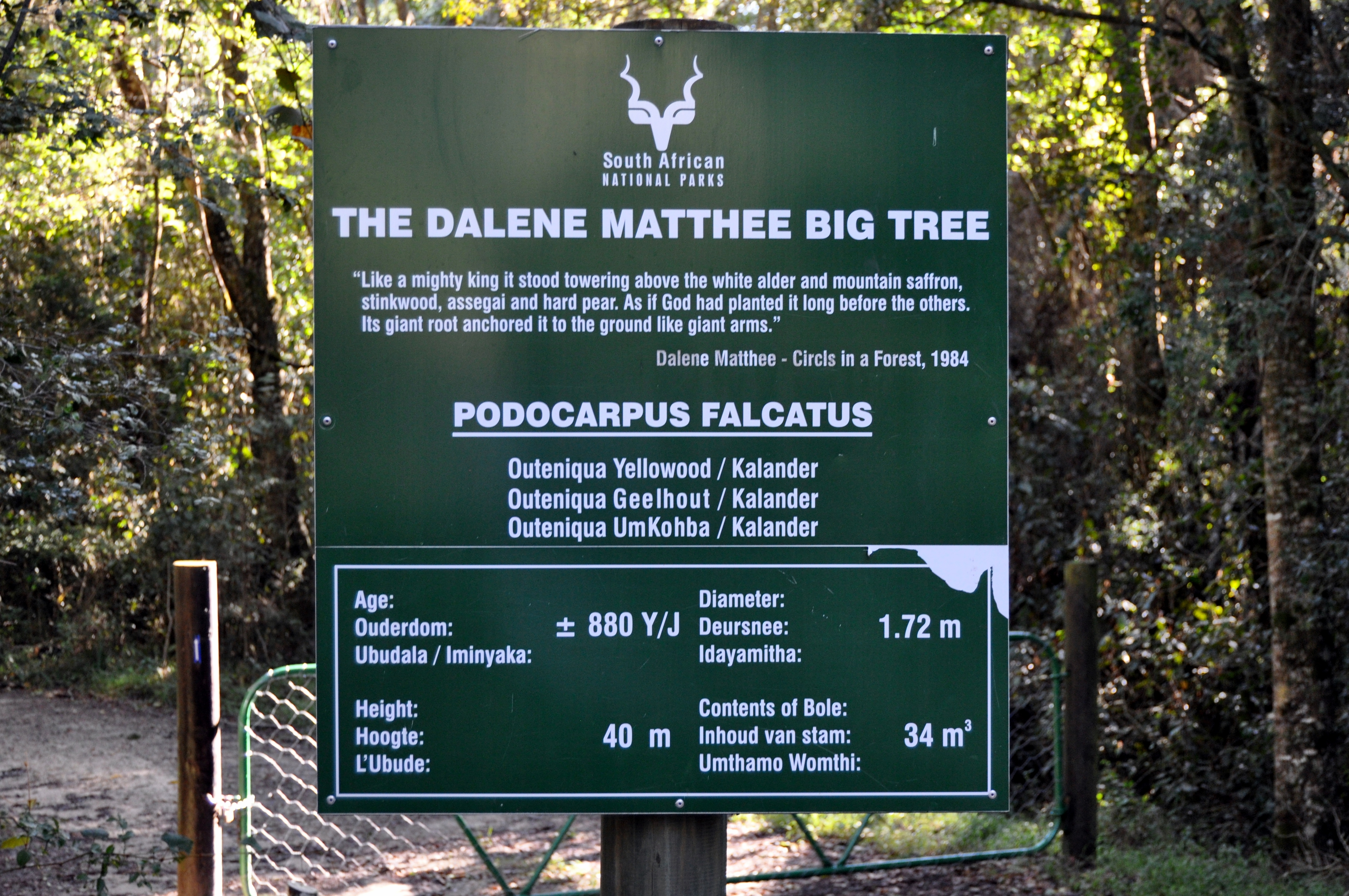

=== The Forest Novels ===
- Kringe in 'n bos (Circles in a Forest) (1984)
- Fiela se Kind (Fiela's Child) (1985)
- Moerbeibos (The Mulberry Forest) (1987)
- Toorbos (Dream Forest) (2003)

=== Other published works ===
- Die twaalfuurstokkie (The twelve-o'-clock stick) (1970)
- Die Judasbok (The Judas Goat) (1982)
- 'n Huis vir Nadia (A House for Nadia) (1982)
- Petronella van Aarde, Burgemeester (Petronella van Aarde, Mayor) (1983)
- Brug van die esels (The Day the Swallows Spoke) (1992)
- Susters van Eva (Sisters of Eve) (1995)
- Pieternella van die Kaap (Pieternella, Daughter of Eva) (2000)
- Die Uitgespoeldes (Driftwood) (2005)

== Legacy ==
Matthee's ashes are scattered at Krisjan-se-Nek, one of her favourite places in the Knysna Forest. In 2008, a memorial was erected here in her memory and the 800-year-old Yellowwood tree standing at that location was renamed Dalene Matthee Big Tree. The name of the hiking trail starting at Krisjan-se-Nek is now called the Circles in a Forest Trail.
