= Circles in a Forest =

1989 South African drama film

- Directed by: Regardt Van den Bergh
- Written by: Luli Barzman; Fabrice Ziolkowski
- Produced by: Philo Pieterse
- Starring: Ian Bannen; Brion James; Joe Stewardson
- Cinematography: George Tirl
- Edited by: John Grover
- Music by: Leonard Rosenman
- Production companies: Lars International Pictures; Philo Pieterse Productions
- Distributed by: Lars International Pictures
- Release date: 18 August 1989
- Running time: 92 minutes
- Country: South Africa
- Language: English

Circles in a Forest is a 1989 South African drama film directed by Regardt van den Bergh and starring Ian Bannen, Brion James and Joe Stewardson. The film score was composed by Leonard Rosenman.

The film is adapted from the novel by Dalene Matthee by screenwriters Luli Barzman and Fabrice Ziolkowski.

== Plot ==
Saul Barnard befriends an elephant as a child, and later goes back to rescue it as a man.

== Cast ==
- Ian Bannen as MacDonald
- Brion James as Mr. Patterson
- Dorette Potgieter as Jane
- Joe Stewardson as Joram Barnard
- Judi Trott as Kate MacDonald
- Arnold Vosloo as Saul Barnard
