= Lara Foot Newton =

South African playwright

Lara Foot
- Born: 1967 (age 58–59); Pretoria
- Other name: Lara Foot
- Education: University of the Witwatersrand
- Occupations: Playwright, producer, theatre director
- Known for: Artistic Director of Baxter Theatre Centre
- Awards: Standard Bank Young Artist Award (1995), Fleur du Cap Theatre Award (2017)

Lara Foot Newton is a South African theatre director, playwright, and producer. She has served as the chief executive officer and artistic director of the Baxter Theatre Centre in Cape Town since 2010, becoming the first woman to hold this position.

Foot's work frequently engages with social issues, and throughout her career she has been involved in supported emerging South African theatre-makers. Foot has received multiple accolades for her work, including the Scotsman Fringe First Award, Standard Bank Young Artist Award, Naledi Awards, Fleur du Cap Awards and National Arts Festival Featured Artist Award. Foot was selected for the Rolex Mentor and Protégé Arts Initiative, training under British director Sir Peter Hall. She is a Sundance Fellow and ISPA International Citation of Merit Recipient.

== Early life and education ==
Foot was born and raised in Pretoria, South Africa. She completed a Bachelor of Arts (Honours) degree in drama at the University of the Witwatersrand in 1989. She later earned a Master of Arts in drama from the University of Cape Town in 2007.

== Career ==
Foot's early career was shaped by mentorship under Barney Simon at the Market Theatre, where she became Resident Director in 1996 and Associate Artistic Director by 1998. Foot's wrote and directed her first solo production Tshepang in 2002. The play was written as part of Foot's Masters of Arts thesis and was originally performed in Amsterdam in 2003. The New York Times wrote in 2007 that that Foot "gained international prominence" with Tshepang.

In 2004 Foot wrote and directed the short film And Into The Dust. Following this project, Foot was selected to be part of the Sundance Institute’s 2007 Screenwriters Lab and the Sundance Film Director’s Lab in 2008.

Foot was offered the role of resident director and dramaturge at The Baxter Theatre Centre in 2005. Her next project, the 2007 work Karoo Moose, is a coming-of-age tale dealing with rural violence and poverty. The production won 12 Naledi Awards, including Best New South African Play produced, Best Director of a Play or Musical, Best Performance by an Actress in a Supporting Role, and Best Production Cutting Edge/Ensemble. Karoo Moose was staged at London’s Tricycle Theatre, where The Guardian wrote in 2009 that "Foot Newton is as interested in the way stories are told as she is in their content.”

In 2011, Foot wrote and directed Solomon and Marion which won Best New South African Play at the Fleur Du Cap Awards. The play was also performed at the Edinburgh Fringe Festival in 2012.

Foot was the international producer on South African director and playwright Yael Faber's Mies Julie which first ran at The Baxter Theatre Centre in 2012 and went on to show in Edinburgh, London, Galway, New York and Boston.

Foot's 2014 production of Fishers of Hope premiered at the Grahamstown National Arts Festival and explores the social and environmental effects on a family and community in a fishing village. The play won two Fleur du Cap Awards that same year as well as Best Production of a Play at the Naledi Awards in 2015.

In 2016 Foot was announced as the Featured Artist at the Grahamstown National Arts Festival. In her role as Featured Artist, Foot wrote and directed An Inconvenience of Wings which premiered at the festival that year. The play explores mental illness and friendship, and earned Foot the Fleur du Cap Theatre Award for Best Director in 2017. The play was shown to audiences at The National Arts Festival, The Baxter Theatre Centre, The Market Theatre and the Edinburgh Fringe Festival.

In 2021, Foot wrote and directed an adaptation of J.M. Coetzee’s 1983 Booker Prize-winning novel Life & Times of Michael K. The production featured puppetry by Handspring Puppet Company, known for their work on War Horse. The play was a co-production with the Düsseldorf Schauspielhaus and The Baxter Theatre Centre and was initially scheduled to premiere at the Theatre der Welt festival at Düsseldorf Schauspielhaus in Germany in 2020. Due to the lockdowns imposed during the Covid-19 pandemic, it was postponed to June 2021 and was made accessible through a livestream of the performance from The Baxter Theatre Centre to the Düsseldorf Schauspielhaus. The play was performed at The Baxter Theatre Centre in 2022.

Life & Times of Michael K received critical acclaim with The New York Times calling its Edinburgh Fringe performance in 2023 “the standout Fringe show.” Foot received The Scotsman Fringe First Award for innovation and outstanding new writing at the Assembly Fringe Festival in Edinburgh.

Foot reimagined Shakespeare's Othello which premiered at the Düsseldorf Schauspielhaus in September 2023. The play is set in German South West Africa, highlights Africa's colonial past and explores racial identity. Foot's direction for Othello won the 2023 Gustaf Theatre Award for Outstanding Artistic Achievement.

In 2025 Foot was the associate director on William Kentridge's Faustus in Africa which opened at the Baxter Theatre Centre.

== Impact and advocacy ==
Foot founded the Zabalaza Theatre Festival which provides a platform for township-based theatre-makers. The festival includes year-round skills development for emerging artists.
