= Fingo Festival =

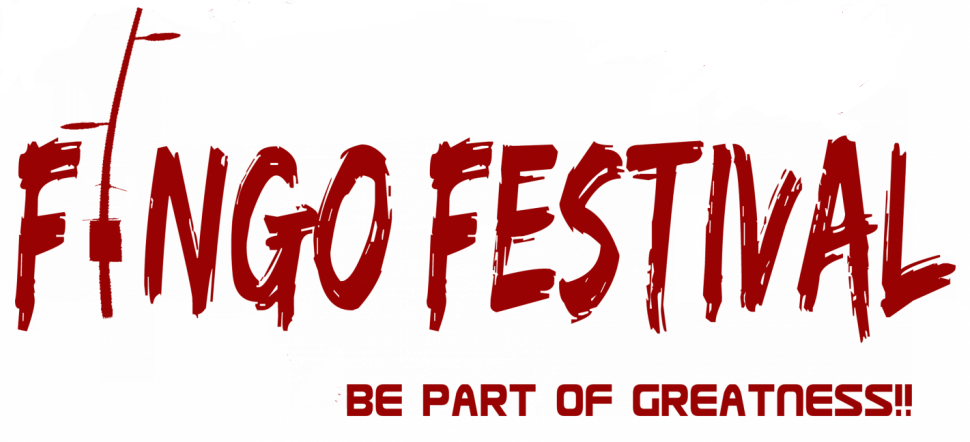
Fingo Festival

The Fingo Festival is a community-led arts festival held at Fingo Village Square in Fingo Village, a township 3 kilometres outside of Grahamstown, Eastern Cape. The festival runs for five to seven days, depending on funding, every June/July during the National Arts Festival. Established in 2011, the festival uses art as a tool to promote social cohesion, dialogue and social transformation within the Fingo Village township and the larger Grahamstown community. Featuring local and international acts, the festival's programme includes children's programmes, visual art, drama, music, workshops and youth dialogues.

== History ==
The first Fingo Festival took place at the Raglan Road Multipurpose Centre in the Raglan Road precinct of Fingo Village during the 37th anniversary of the National Arts Festival in July 2011. The roots of the Fingo Festival can be traced back to the Fingo Revolutionary Movement, an activist group started by artists from Fingo Village in 2004. Using the word "Fingo" derived from the Fengu people, also known as Fingo people, which means "one who seeks a place to stay" in the local language Xhosa, the movement began seeking spaces to build social cohesion and enhance community development. Festival CEO, Xolile Madinda, also a member of the movement, was inspired by Steve Biko's teachings of self-empowerment which is why he founded Save Our Schools And Community Campaign (SOSAC), an NGO which hosted several back-to-school and educational campaigns in 2008. In 2011, the Fingo Revolutionary Movement partnered with Khulumani Support Group, SOSAC and Makana Local Municipality, which pledged R40 000, to create a platform to keep the local kids away from crime while unearthing their potential through various forms of art and creative projects aimed at building social cohesion. The platform became known as the Fingo Festival.

== Location ==
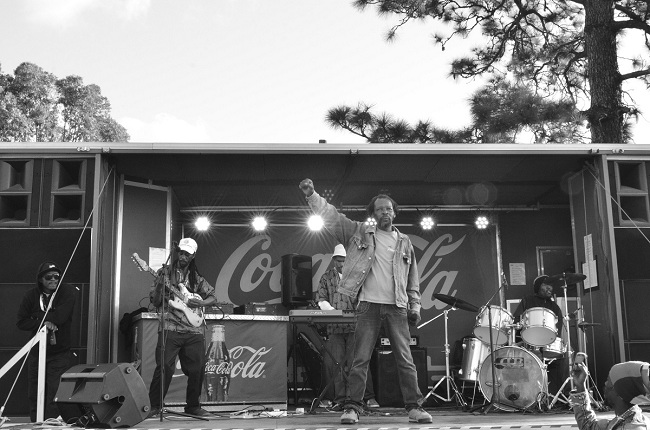
Fingo Festival live

Fingo Village, home to the Fingo Festival, was established in 1855 as a freehold village to reward the Mfengu tribe who had fought on the side of the British in the eighth frontier war of 1850 to 1853. The Mfengu (Fingos) had moved from a Shaka-dominated KwaZulu-Natal into the Transkei in the 1820s, and in 1835 Sir Benjamin D'Urban settled 17 000 of them on the colonial side of the Cape Frontier before they pledged their assistance to the British war arsenal. In the 1970s the apartheid government sought to move the inhabitants of Fingo Village to nearby Glenmore under the Group Areas of 1950. However, after vigorous protesting from the residents, they were allowed to continue occupying the area. In 2011, according to the government census of that year, Fingo Village had a population of 4015 and 1293 households. 97% of the population is black with other races making up the remaining 3%. In Fingo Village, 90.09% of the population speaks isiXhosa with English speakers counting for 3.40% and other languages such as Zulu, Afrikaans and Ndebele making up the remaining 7%. In Grahamstown, home to the National Arts Festival there is great inequality between the city and townships like Fingo Village and Joza. According to the 2010 statistics, Makana Local Municipality, under which Fingo Village belongs, had a population of some 70,000 people with 27,546 or close to 40% still living in poverty.

"We chose Fingo, because of the location, not because of any traditional association. "We saw that during the National Arts Festival, most of the focus was situated in the CBD of Grahamstown and in and around the Rhodes University campus whilst other areas of Grahamstown, like the surrounding townships, weren't being noticed. Residents of these townships and these areas are interested in participating in the festivities and showcasing their art and their talent but they don't have a platform or a point of access into the mainstream festival," said Festival Director, Luvuyo Booi of the festival's choice of location.

== Ties with the National Arts Festival ==
Fingo Festival, which started as an independent community-led festival, was incorporated into the main programme of the National Arts Festival (NAF) in 2012 and continues to encourage inclusivity, social cohesion and activity in the township during the National Arts Festival. "We partner with elements of the community who wish to take advantage of that and we are open to proposals from any sector as to how we can position the festival. For example, this year we have launched together with the Fingo Festival a whole initiative in Fingo Village. We put out a Coca Cola truck and gave them some cash because they came to us with a great idea."said National Arts Festival CEO, Tony Lankester of its relationship with Fingo Festival in 2013. Madinda, CEO of Fingo Festival, has acknowledged the support from the National Arts Festival but has also stated that the festival needs to stand on its own and not rely on NAF. "We can't just rely on the [main] Festival; it needs to be sustainable. We want to encourage artists to come and use this space for their own good.". The National Arts Festival also helps promote Fingo Festival on its website.

== Programmes ==
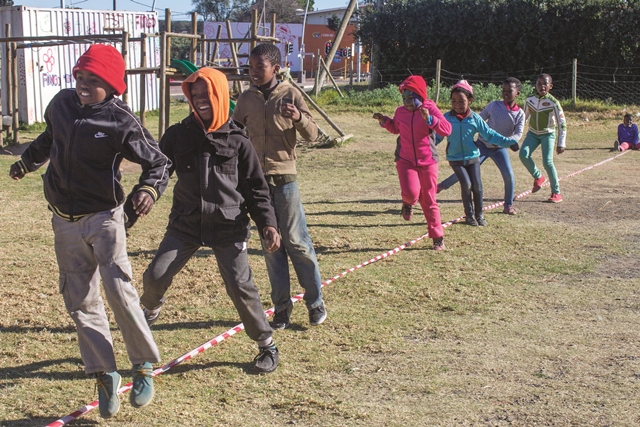

Each year, the Fingo Festival has been centred around a theme. Although the theme is a major factor in the structure of the festival, the children's programmes will usually feature face painting, children's plays and storytelling in the mornings while the afternoons will be dedicated to dialogue, followed by a variety of arts, hip hop and live music performances. These are the themes that have been adopted at the festival over the years:

== 2011 ==
On the year of its inception, the Fingo Festival's aim was to establish a culture of "Vukuzenzele" (Stand up for yourself), be inclusive, build a platform for local artists and social cohesion in the Grahamstown community. "The idea is to make that in the township there is life during the festival (National Arts Festival)," said Xolile Madinda of the project. It was during this festival that it adopted its slogan "Be Part Of Greatness".

== 2012 ==
Riding on the success of the first Fingo Festival in 2011, the festival focused on the "200th anniversary of Grahamstown and the 100th anniversary of the African National Congress(ANC). The festival also focused on how the arts were traditionally used as a cultural weapon in the past, and how they can be used to communicate and promote unity between cultures in today's world. "We didn't choose this focus. The times are driving us to this focus. These things are just highlighted now, but they've all been an issue throughout time," said Bulelani Booi, one of the festival organisers. The festival also began to adopt dialogue, using a loose structure that allowed people to voice issues.

== 2013 ==
In its third year, Fingo Festival adopted the theme Konke Kuyenzeka: See You In The Crowd. The goal of the festival was to encourage inclusivity and boost attendance by artists and festival-goers. "We can't just rely on the [National Arts] Festival; it needs to be sustainable. We want to encourage artists to come and use this space for their own good," festival CEO, Xolile Madinda, said about the 2013 festival. The festival introduced the Business Beyond dialogue to encourage local businesses to take part in the festival while sticking to its usual children's programmes and live performances for adults in the afternoon.

== 2014 ==
In 2014, the festival celebrated "20 years of democracy in South Africa". To push this theme they adopted the slogan "20fourrrrThina" (2014 for us), which represented how democracy enabled South Africans to play a role in society. With the tradition of children's programmes continuing, the festival included dialogue and women's workshop on leadership, a discussion on business beyond the Festival and a round table hip hop discussion known as Around Hip Hop.

== 2015 ==
Due to a lack of funding, the 2015 festival only ran for four days, from 8–11 July. Despite this, the festival managed to attract internationally renowned storyteller, Gcina Mhlophe, to narrate stories for children. The festival also featured Port Elizabeth-based vocalist Asanda Mqiki in 2015. Included in the festival's programme was The Fingo Dialogues, which were:

- 8 July-Social State: the exploration of psychological well-being
- 9 July-Intyatyambo Elityeni- A realisation of misplacement, discord and demeanour.
- 10 July- Business Beyond Festival- An out of the direction of economical growth and sustainability on art business.
- 11 July-Visual Arts and Works- Discourse of Social Cohesion and Social Justice

== 2016 ==
In 2016, the festival partnered with trufm under the theme 40 years of youth struggle in commemoration of the 40th anniversary of the 1976 Soweto uprisings. As part of the theme, following dialogues were held in the afternoons during the festival:

- 5 July 2016- Social State dialogue,
- 6 July- Business Beyond Festival dialogue
- 7 July Women-only dialogue
- 8 July Around Hip-Hop dialogue

== 2017 ==
In 2017, the festival will be focusing on the legacy of late African National Congress stalwart and anti-apartheid struggle hero Oliver Tambo.

== Impact and reception ==
Although there are no official statistics to measure the economic and community impact of the Fingo Festival, the reception from the community has been warm. "We are very happy with the Festival because people go there and they don't know about our facilities. Then they come here and learn about what we have." Zanele Panini, the librarian at Fingo Village Library said about the event.

== Partnerships ==
- trufm
- National Arts Festival
- Makana Municipality
- Khulumani Support Group
- Eastern Cape Department of Sports, Recreation Arts and Culture
- Blah Ze Blah
- Makana Municipality
- Recycling and Economic Development Initiative of South Africa (REDISA)

== Festival Directors ==
- Xolile Madinda: CEO since 2011
- Bulelani Booi-Festival Director since 2011
- Luntu Madinda- Media Liaison since 2013
- Sinethemba Mzwali-Media
- Lonwabo Phillip- Technical Director since 2013
- Sisanda Mankayi- Project Manager

== See also ==
- National Arts Festival
- Grahamstown
