= Adelaide Tambo Award for Human Rights in the Arts =

Award by the South African National Arts Festival

The Adelaide Tambo Award for Human Rights in the Arts is an annual award by the South African National Arts Festival to "honour an artist or company whose work on the Fringe programme embodies Adelaide Tambo's passion for the arts and her deep commitment for human rights."

The winner receives a cash award, as well as production incentive to extend the run of the play and to present the same a new play at the following year's festival.

== Recipients ==
- 2018 Forgotten Angle Theatre Collaborative
- 2017 Ngizwe Youth Theatre for The Little One
- 2016 Drama for Life for AfriQueer
- 2015 Irene Stephanou for Searching for Somebody
- 2014 Harry Kalmer, The Bram Fischer Waltz
