= Jackson Hlungwani =

South African sculptor (1923–2010)

Jackson Hlungwani (1923 – 20 January 2010) was a South African sculptor, priest, and founder of the Yesu Galeliya One Aposto in Sanyoni Alt and Omega in New Jerusalem, a site located in Mbhokota in the Limpopo. A deeply religious man, Hlunwani's work is defined by its spirituality and connection to the community.

== See also ==
- Elana Brundyn
