= National Arts Festival =

South African annual performing arts festival

Coordinates: 33°19′10″S 26°31′10″E

- Genre: Arts Festival
- Dates: June/July annually
- Location: Grahamstown
- Years active: 50
- Founded: 13 July 1973
- Attendance: 209 677
- Patrons: Standard Bank, MNET, National Lotteries Commission, City Press, Department of Arts and Culture, Eastern Cape Government
- Website: National Arts Festival

The National Arts Festival (NAF) is an annual festival of performing arts in Makhanda, South Africa. It is the largest arts festival on the African continent and one of the largest performing arts festivals in the world by visitor numbers.

The festival runs for 11 days, from the last week of June to the first week of July every year. It takes place in the small university city of Makhanda (previously known as Grahamstown), in the Eastern Cape province of South Africa.

The NAF comprises a Main programme and a Fringe festival, both administered by the National Arts Festival Office, a non-profit Section 21 Company. The Festival programme includes performing arts (theatre, dance, stand-up comedy and live music), visual art exhibitions, films, talks and workshops, a large food and craft fair and historical tours of the city. The NAF runs a children's arts festival over the same period and a number of other festivals take place in Makhanda over the period of the NAF, such as the National Youth Jazz Festival.

Performances take place across the city in approximately 60 venues (such as theatres, churches, schools) as well as in various outdoor locations for the street performances.

The Festival attracts significant numbers of local and international visitors and is one of the biggest contributors to the economy of the region.

== The main programme ==
A committee of curators in the various disciplines selects the content of the main programme. The planning process takes into account what is available locally and from outside South Africa. Three considerations that influence decisions are the artistic merits of any submission, the creation of a varied and balanced programme, and the costs involved.

=== Subsidiary festivals ===
A number of subsidiary festivals take place as part of the National Arts Festival:

- Think Fest
- Spiritfest
- Wordfest
- National Youth Jazz Festival
- Fingo Festival
- Creativate Digital Arts Festival
- National Schools Festival

== Young Artist Awards ==
The Young Artist Awards, sponsored by Standard Bank, are presented by the National Arts Festival Artistic Committee to emerging, relatively young South African artists who have demonstrated exceptional ability in their chosen fields but who have not yet achieved national exposure and acclaim.

Festival Committee members, fellow artists and interested members of the public, nominate artists. The NAF Committee, a group of experts in the various arts disciplines, decides on the final recipients.

Designed to encourage the recipients in the pursuit of their careers, a key aspect of the awards is that they guarantee the artists a place on the main programme of the forthcoming National Arts Festival. Apart from a cash prize, each of the winners receive substantial financial backing for their Festival participation whether this involves the mounting of an exhibition or the staging of a production.

A maximum of five awards are made annually in any one of the disciplines of drama, music, jazz, visual art, dance and film. Since the inception of the awards in 1981 more than 150 awards have been presented plus five special awards to artists in recognition of their contribution to the National Arts Festival and the arts of South Africa. A complete list of previous winners is as follows:

Year	Music	Drama	Dance	Jazz	Visual Art	Other
2023	Zoë Modiga	Momo Matsunyane	Lorin Sookool	Darren English	Stephané Conradie	Angel Ho (Performance Art)
2022	Msaki	Billy Langa & Mahlatsi Mokgonyana	Sylvester Thamsanqa Majela	Linda Sikhakane	Lady Skollie	Koleka Potuma (Poetry)
2021	Cara Stacey	Thando Doni	Kristi-Leigh Gresse	Vuma Levin	Buhlebezwe Siwani	Gavin Krastin (Performance Art)
2020	Nthato Mokgata	Jefferson Tshabalala	Lulu Prudence Mlangeni	Sisonke Xonti	Blessing Ngobeni	–
2019	Megan-Geoffrey Prins	Amy Jephta	Kitty Phetla	Mandla Mlangeni	Gabrielle Goliath	–
2018	Guy Buttery	Jemma Kahn	Musa Hlatshwayo	Thandi Ntuli	Igshaan Adams	Chuma Sopotela (Performance Art)
2017	Abel Selaocoe	Monageng 'Vice' Motshabi	Thandazile Radebe	Benjamin Jephta	Beth Armstrong	Dineo Bopape (Performance Art)
2016	Avigail Bushakevitz	Jade Bowers	Themba Mbuli	Siya Makuzeni	Mohau Modisakeng	–
2015	Musa Ngqunqwana	Christiaan Olwagen	Luyanda Sibiya	Nduduzo Makhathini	Kemang Wa Lehurele	Athi Patra Ruga (Performance Art)
2014	Njabulo Madlala	Greg Homann	Nicola Elliott	Kyle Shepherd	Hasan & Husain Essop	Jahmil XT Qubeka (Film); Donna Kukama (Performance Art)
2013	Runette Botha	Prince Lamla	Fana Tshabalala	Shane Cooper	Mary Sibande	Anthea Moys (Performance Art)
2012	Kelebogile Boikanyo	Princess Mhlongo	Bailey Snyman	Afrika Mkhize	Mikhael Subotzky	–
2011	Ben Schoeman	Neil Coppen	Mamela Nyamza	Bokani Dyer	Nandipha Mntambo	–
2010	Samson Diamond	Janni Younge	Mlu Zondi	Melanie Scholtz	Michael MacGarry	Claire Angelique (Film)
2009	Jacques Imbrailo	Ntshieng Mokgoro	Thabo Rapoo	Kesivan Naidoo	Nicholas Hlobo	–
2008	Zanne Stapelberg	Jaco Bouwer	Dada Masilo	Mark Fransman	Nontsikelelo Veleko	–
2007	Bronwen Forbay	–	Acty Tang	Shannon Mowday	Pieter Hugo	Akin Omotoso (Film)
2006	–	Sylvaine Strike	Hlengiwe Lushaba	Concord Nkabinde	Churchill Madikida	–
2005	Andile Yenana	Mpumelelo Paul Grootboom	Peter John Sabbagha	–	Wim Botha	Ramolao Makhene (Standard Bank Special Award for the invaluable contribution to and significant achievement in Theatre – posthumous award)
2004	Tutu Puoane	Mncedisi Baldwin Shabangu	Portia Lebogang Mashigo	–	Kathryn Smith	Moses Taiwa Molelekwa (Standard Bank Special Award for the invaluable contribution to and significant achievement in Music – posthumous award)
2003	Angela Gilbert	Yael Farber	Moya Michael	–	Berni Searle	Dumisani Phakhati (Film)
2002	Prince Kupi	Sello Maake Ka-Ncube	Gregory Vuyani Maqoma	–	Brett Murray	–
2001	Fikile Mvinjelwa	Brett Bailey	Tracey Human	–	Walter Oltmann	–
2000	Gloria Bosman	Zenzi Mbuli	–	–	Alan Alborough	–
1999	–	–	–	–	–	–
1998	Bongani Ndodana-Breen	Aubrey Sekhabi	David Mudanalo Matamela and Debbie Rakusin	–	Nhlanhla Xaba	–
1997	Sibongile Mngoma (Opera)	Geoffrey Hyland	–	–	Lien Botha	Alfred Hinkel (Standard Bank Special Award for invaluable contribution to and significant achievement in Dance)
1996	Victor Masondo	Lara Foot Newton	Vincent Mantsoe	–	Trevor Makhoba	–
1995	Abel Motsoadi	John Ledwaba	Boyzie Cekwana	–	Jane Alexander	–
1994	Michael Williams (Opera)	Jerry Mofokeng	–	–	Sam Nhlengethwa	–
1993	Sibongile Khumalo	–	Christopher Kindo	–	Pippa Skotnes	–
1992	Raphael Vilakazi	Deon Opperman	–	–	Tommy Motswai	Kevin Harris (Film)
1991	–	Peter Ngwenya	–	–	Andries Botha	Darrell Roodt (Film)
1990	–	–	Robyn Orlin	–	Fée Halsted-Berning and Bonnie Ntshalintshali	–
1989	Johnny Clegg	Marthinus Basson	Gary Gordon	–	Helen Sebidi	Pieter-Dirk Uys (Drama) (1820 Foundation Special Award)
1988	–	Mbongeni Ngema	–	–	Margaret Vorster	–
1987	Hans Roosenschoon	–	–	–	William Kentridge	–
1986	–	Andrew Buckland	–	–	Gavin Younge	–
1985	Sidwill Hartman	Maishe Maponya	–	–	Marion Arnold	–
1984	–	Ken Leach	–	–	Peter Schütz	Lamar Crowson (Music) (Standard Bank / 1820 Foundation 10th Anniversary Special Award)
1983	David Kosviner	Paul Slabolepszy	–	–	Malcolm Payne	–
1982	–	Janice Honeyman	Lindy Raizenberg (Ballet)	–	Neil Rodger	–
1981	John Theodore	Richard E Grant	–	–	Jules van de Vijver	–

== Fringe awards ==
In 2010, the National Arts Festival launched a new set of awards for Fringe productions – the Standard Bank Ovation Awards. These awards recognise excellence on the Fringe, and aim to seek out those productions that are innovative, original and creatively outstanding. At the end of the Festival, Gold and Silver awards are selected from the list of winners, rewarding the best productions in the categories theatre, dance, comedy, music.

Recipients of the Standard Bank Ovation Awards benefit from the recognition provided by the acknowledgement, with companies or artists often being offered extended tours, international opportunities to perform, increased opportunities for funding, and an invitation to submit a proposal for the following year's Arena programme. Artists who win Gold and Silver awards receive modest monetary incentives.

In 2014, the Festival launched the Adelaide Tambo Award for Human Rights in the Arts to "honour an artist or company whose work on the Fringe programme embodies Adelaide Tambo's passion for the arts and her deep commitment for human rights."

== Featured artists ==
Since the Featured Artist Programme was launched in 2012, the National Arts Festival has celebrated and showcased established artists who have built up a substantial body of work that has contributed to South Africa's national discourse on race, class or gender in a significant way.

Recipients of this award are:

- 2020: Madosini, traditional musician
- 2019: Bernie Searle, visual artist
- 2018: Mamela Nyamza, dancer and choreographer
- 2017: Neo Muyanga, musician and composer
- 2016: Lara Foot Newton, playwright and director
- 2015: Satire (The genre was chosen as the programme centrepiece)
- 2014: Sylvaine Strike, actor and director
- 2013: Mike van Graan, playwright and director

== Growth and development ==
The NAF has grown since its inception. In 1974 there were 64 events on the main programme. (Events refer to productions, exhibitions, workshops, lectures, tours and so forth. A drama or dance production is counted as a single event irrespective of how many times it may be performed.) The Fringe started in 1979 with 10 events. As of 2010 the National Arts Festival comprises more than 350 events with over 1,200 performances.

== Social responsibility ==
The National Arts Festival claims to be a socially responsible festival, this however, has been contested.

The Hands On! Masks Off! programme focuses on strengthening the entrepreneurial skills of the arts community by bringing together arts entrepreneurs to share skills and knowledge with a new generation of arts managers.

In 2010 the Remix Laboratory saw a 120 community-based artists from around the country participate in a residency programme during the NAF. The scholars attended workshops, seminars, performances and visits to galleries while being mentored in arts practice and arts appreciation.

The Art Factory teaches local marginalised and vulnerable youth performance skills such as juggling and acrobatics and combines this with a strategic focus on building the life skills and confidence of the youth. The Art Factory functions as a year-round project in Makhanda.

As part of the ArtsReach Programme the National Arts Festival takes the arts to hospitals, clinics, old age homes and rural areas. A number of artists on the Fringe volunteer their performances for the ArtsReach programme during the NAF.

The Arts Encounter Project distributes a number of tickets to indigent individuals to enable them to enjoy productions from the NAF's main and fringe programmes.

== Staff ==
The National Arts Festival has a small permanent staff comprising around 10 full-time staff members. Nobesuthu Rayi is the Executive Producer and Rucera Seethal the artistic director.

Former radio presenter and sponsorship manager Tony Lankester served as CEO for over a decade, stepping down in 2019 to take up a position in the UK. During Lankester's tenure, respected arts administrator Ismail Mahomed served as artistic director until 2016. Mahomed was responsible for overseeing the curation of the NAF's artistic content. He was replaced by playwright and arts administrator Ashraf Johaardien, who left at the end of 2018.

During the Festival, the staff complement grows to around 400, including technical staff, largely drawn from the local community of Makhanda.

== International partnerships ==
The National Arts Festival is a member of the World Fringe Alliance, a grouping of 10 Fringe Festivals from different countries. It is also a member of the African Festival Network (AFRIFESTNET). CEO Tony Lankester is chairman and Treasurer of the two organisations respectively. The NAF embarks on numerous partnerships with foreign embassies and presenting institutions, staging several high-profile international works each year.

== See also ==
- Guy Butler (poet)
- Fringe World

== Sources ==
- Snowball, J. D.; Willis, K. G. (2006). "Estimating the Marginal Utility of Different Sections of an Arts Festival: the Case of Visitors to the South African National Arts Festival". Leisure Studies. 25 (1): 43–56. doi:10.1080/0261436052000330410. ISSN 0261-4367. S2CID 145578941.
- Snowball, J. D.; Webb, A.C.M. (2008). "Breaking into the conversation: cultural value and the role of the South African National Arts Festival from apartheid to democracy". International Journal of Cultural Policy. 14 (2): 149–164. doi:10.1080/10286630802106326. ISSN 1028-6632. S2CID 144987200.
- Kenneth W. Grundy (July 1994). "The Politics of South Africa's National Arts Festival: Small Engagements in the Bigger Campaign". African Affairs. 93 (372): 387–409. doi:10.1093/oxfordjournals.afraf.a098726. JSTOR 723369.
- Verweij, P. (2009). "Making Convergence Work in the Newsroom: A Case Study of Convergence of Print, Radio, Television and Online Newsrooms at the African Media Matrix in South Africa During the National Arts Festival". Convergence: The International Journal of Research into New Media Technologies. 15 (1): 75–87. doi:10.1177/1354856508097020. ISSN 1354-8565. S2CID 145734010.
- Willis, K. G.; Snowball, J. D. (2009). "Investigating how the attributes of live theatre productions influence consumption choices using conjoint analysis: the example of the National Arts Festival, South Africa". Journal of Cultural Economics. 33 (3): 167–183. doi:10.1007/s10824-009-9097-z. ISSN 0885-2545. S2CID 154900991.
- Snowball, J. D.; Willis, K.G. (2006). "Building Cultural Capital: Transforming the South African National Arts Festival". The South African Journal of Economics. 74 (1): 20–33. doi:10.1111/j.1813-6982.2006.00046.x. ISSN 0038-2280.
- Saayman, Melville; Rossouw, Riaan (2011). "The significance of festivals to regional economies: measuring the economic value of the Grahamstown National Arts Festival in South Africa". Tourism Economics. 17 (3): 603–624. doi:10.5367/te.2011.0049. ISSN 1354-8166. S2CID 96426655.
- M Kruger; M Saayman; SM Ellis (2010). "Does loyalty pay? First-time versus repeat visitors at a national arts festival". Southern African Business Review. 14 (1).
- Saayman, Melville; Saayman, Andrea (2006). "Does the location of arts festivals matter for the economic impact?". Papers in Regional Science. 85 (4): 569–584. doi:10.1111/j.1435-5957.2006.00094.x. ISSN 1056-8190.
- Snowball, J. D. (2005). "Art for the Masses? Justification for the Public Support of the Arts in Developing Countries – Two Arts Festivals in South Africa". Journal of Cultural Economics. 29 (2): 107–125. doi:10.1007/s10824-005-5064-5. ISSN 0885-2545. S2CID 153831364.
- Snowball, J. D.; Antrobus, G. G. (2005). "Valuing the Arts". South African Journal of Economics. 70 (8): 1297–1319. doi:10.1111/j.1813-6982.2002.tb00067.x. ISSN 0038-2280.
- Snowball, J. D. (2005). "Interpreting Economic Impact Study Results: Spending Patterns, Visitor Numbers and Festival Aims". South African Journal of Economics. 72 (5): 1076–1084. doi:10.1111/j.1813-6982.2004.tb00146.x. ISSN 0038-2280.
- Bain, Keith (1998). "Make Believe: Standard Bank National Arts Festival Grahamstown, 2–12 July 1998". South African Theatre Journal. 12 (1–2): 137–164. doi:10.1080/10137548.1998.9687669. ISSN 1013-7548.
- van der Vyver, Abraham G.; du Plooy-Cilliers, Franzél (2006). "The social dynamics of arts festivals: A comparative analysis of the KKNK and the Grahamstown National Arts Festival". South African Theatre Journal. 20 (1): 192–203. doi:10.1080/10137548.2006.9687832. ISSN 1013-7548. S2CID 219592996.
- Kitshoff, Herman (2004). "Grahamstown National Arts Festival—Grahamstown, 1–10 July 2004". South African Theatre Journal. 18 (1): 246–249. doi:10.1080/10137548.2004.9687791. ISSN 1013-7548. S2CID 110399137.
- Lewis, Megan (1998). "Standard Bank National Arts Festival, Grahamstown, South Africa, 3–13 July 1997 (review)". Theatre Journal. 50 (1): 105–107. doi:10.1353/tj.1998.0018. ISSN 1086-332X. S2CID 191525482.
- Neethling, Miemie (2011). "To fund or not to fund". South African Theatre Journal. 14 (1): 202–217. doi:10.1080/10137548.2000.9687710. ISSN 1013-7548. S2CID 179042240.
