= Wim Botha =

South African sculptor

- Born: 1974 (age 51–52)

Wim Botha (born 1974) is a South African contemporary artist.

== Biography ==
Botha was born in Pretoria in 1974 and has lived in Cape Town since the 2000s. He grew up in a suburban town on the eastern side of Pretoria. In 1996, Botha graduated from the University of Pretoria with a Bachelors in Visual Art. He has received the Helgaard Steyn Prize for sculpture in 2013, Standard Bank Young Artist Award 2005, and the Tollman Award 2003.

== Works ==
Botha has found inspiration for his work in government texts and religious icons, objects that show belief, faith, observation, transgression and forgiveness. Among the mediums he uses are treated wood, books, acrylic enamel paint, oil paint, steel, Indian ink, bronze, paper, and marble.

Botha has described his works as a process of distillation, reducing broad ideas to a core idea and exploring the variables and patterns that intersect along the way.

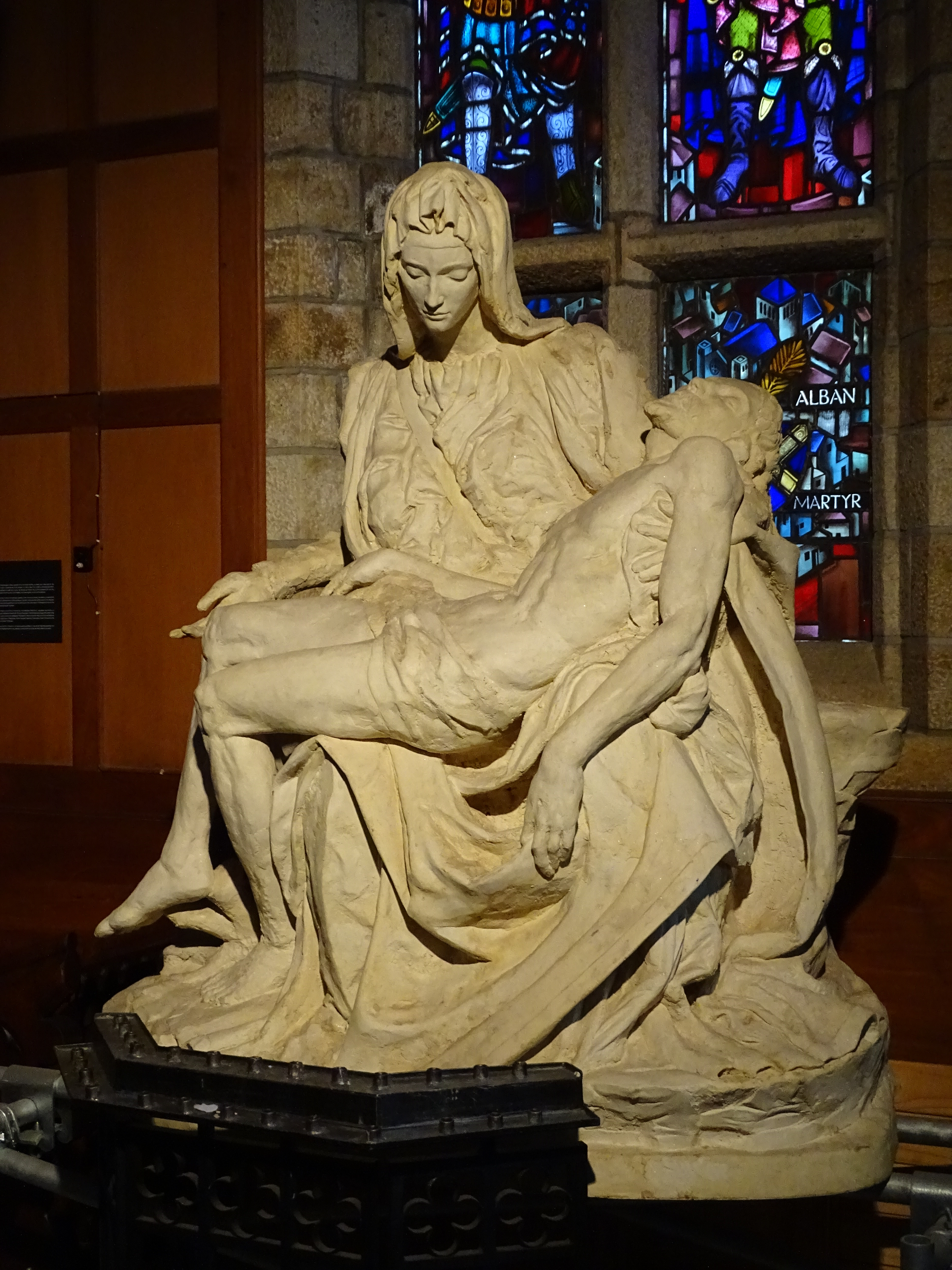
Wim Botha, Mieliepap Pieta, 2004

== Exhibitions ==
2003 Speculum - Stevenson, Cape Town

2005

- A Premonition of War - Durban Art Gallery, Durban
- A Premonition of War. Standard Bank Young - The Nelson Mandela Metropolitan Art Museum, Port Elizabeth
- Cold Fusion. Gods, Heroes and Martyrs - Stevenson, Cape Town
- Standard Bank Young Artist for Visual Art 2005 - South African National Art Gallery, Cape Town

2006 Wim Botha: Standard Bank Young Artist for Visual Art 2005 - Standard Bank Gallery, Johannesburg

2007 Wim Botha: Apocalagnosia - Stevenson, Cape Town

2008 Wim Botha - Galerie Jette Rudolph, Berlin Wim Botha - Stevenson, Johannesburg

2009 Wim Botha: Joburg Altarpiece & Amazing Things from Other Places - Stevenson, Cape Town

2011 All Around - Galerie Jette Rudolph, Berlin Wim Botha - Stevenson, Cape Town

2012 Wim Botha - Stevenson, Johannesburg

2013 PREDICATES - Galerie Jette Rudolph, Berlin

2014 Linear Perspectives - Stevenson, Cape Town

=== Group shows ===
2003

- The Ampersand Foundation - Warren Siebrits Gallery, Johannesburg
- Contact Zones - Colonial & Contemporary - Stevenson, Cape Town

2004

- Personal Affects - Power and Poetics in Contemporary - Museum for African Art, New York City, NY
- Afrika Remix - Zeitgenössische Kunst eines Kontinents - Museum Kunstpalast, Düsseldorf

2005

- South African art 1848 - now - Stevenson, Cape Town
- African Remix - l'art contemporain d'un continent - Centre Pompidou - Musée National d´Art Moderne, Paris
- Africa Remix – Contemporary Art of a Continent - Hayward Gallery, London

2006

- South African Art Now - Stevenson, Cape Town
- Africa Remix - Moderna Museet, Stockholm
- What lies beneath - New Art from South Africa - Galerie Mikael Andersen, Copenhagen
- Africa Remix - Contemporary Art of a Continent - Mori Art Museum, Tokyo
- 7ème Biennale de l´Art Africain contemporain - Dak'Art Biennale de l’art africain contemporain, Dakar
- Personal Affects - Power and Poetics in Contemporary South African Art - Honolulu Museum of Art, Honolulu, HI
- Olvida quien soy - Centro Atlántico de Arte Moderno (CAAM), Las Palmas de Gran Canaria

2007

- Politische Ikonografie - Galerie Jette Rudolph, Berlin
- Summer 2007/8 - Stevenson, Cape Town
- Africa Remix - Contemporary art of a continent - Johannesburg Art Gallery (JAG), Johannesburg
- TRANS CAPE - contemporary African art on the move - Trans Cape Africa, Cape Town
- Afterlife - Stevenson, Cape Town

2008 Disguise: The art of attracting and deflecting attention - Stevenson, Cape Town

2009 Self/Not-self - Stevenson, Johannesburg

2010

- Index 40: Leading Works from the Sanlam Art Collection - Smac Art Gallery, Stellenbosch
- PEEKABOO - Current South Africa - Helsinki Art Museum, Helsinki
- Triennale Kleinplastik - Larger Than Life - Stranger Than Fiction - Triennale Kleinplastik Fellbach, Fellbach

2011

- Conrad Botes With Berni Searle, Wim Botha, Nandipha Mntambo, Penny Siopis, Serge Alain Nitegeka + Sabelo Mlangeni - Turner Gallery, Perth, WA
- mémoires du futur - la collection Olbricht - La Maison Rouge, Paris
- Göteborg International Biennial for Contemporary Art 2011 - Göteborg International Biennial for Contemporary Art, Gothenburg
- iALPTRAUM! - Blank Projects, Cape Town
- New Acquisitions - The Nelson Mandela Metropolitan Art Museum, Port Elizabeth
- Alptraum! - Anat Egbi, Los Angeles, CA
- ¡ALPTRAUM! - Washington D.C., London, Berlin, Los Angeles, Kapstadt - Projektraum Deutscher Künstlerbund, Berlin

2012

- Alptraum - The Nightmare Never Ends - X project space, Berlin
- Alptraum - Green Papaya Art Project - - Metropolitan Museum of Manila, Manila
- Alptraum - Green Papaya Art Projects, Quezon City
- Alptraum - Goethe-Institut Johannesburg, Johannesburg

2013 A Sculptural Premise - Stevenson, Cape Town Pophits & Alptraum - Artspace RheinMain, Offenbach The Loom of the Land - Stevenson, Johannesburg

2014

- Artists Engaged? Maybe - Gulbenkian. Próximo Futuro, Lisbon
- Alptraum - Maribor Art Gallery, Maribor
- Alptraum - Maribor Art Gallery, Maribor
- The Divine Comedy. Heaven, hell, purgatory from the perspective of African contemporary artists - -Museum für Moderne Kunst (MMK), Frankfurt/Main

== Exhibition catalogues ==
- Wim Botha: Speculum (2003)
- Wim Botha: Cold Fusion: Gods, heroes and martyrs (2005)
- Wim Botha: Standard Bank Young Artist (2005)
- Wim Botha: Apocalagnosia (2007)
- Wim Botha: Joburg Altarpiece & Amazing Things from Other Places (PDF only, 2009)
- Wim Botha: Busts 2003-2012 (2012)
- Wim Botha: Solipsis I-V (2013)
- Wim Botha: Rooms 2001-2014 (2014)
