= Knysna–Amatole montane forests =

Ecoregion in South Africa

Knysna-Amatole montane forests
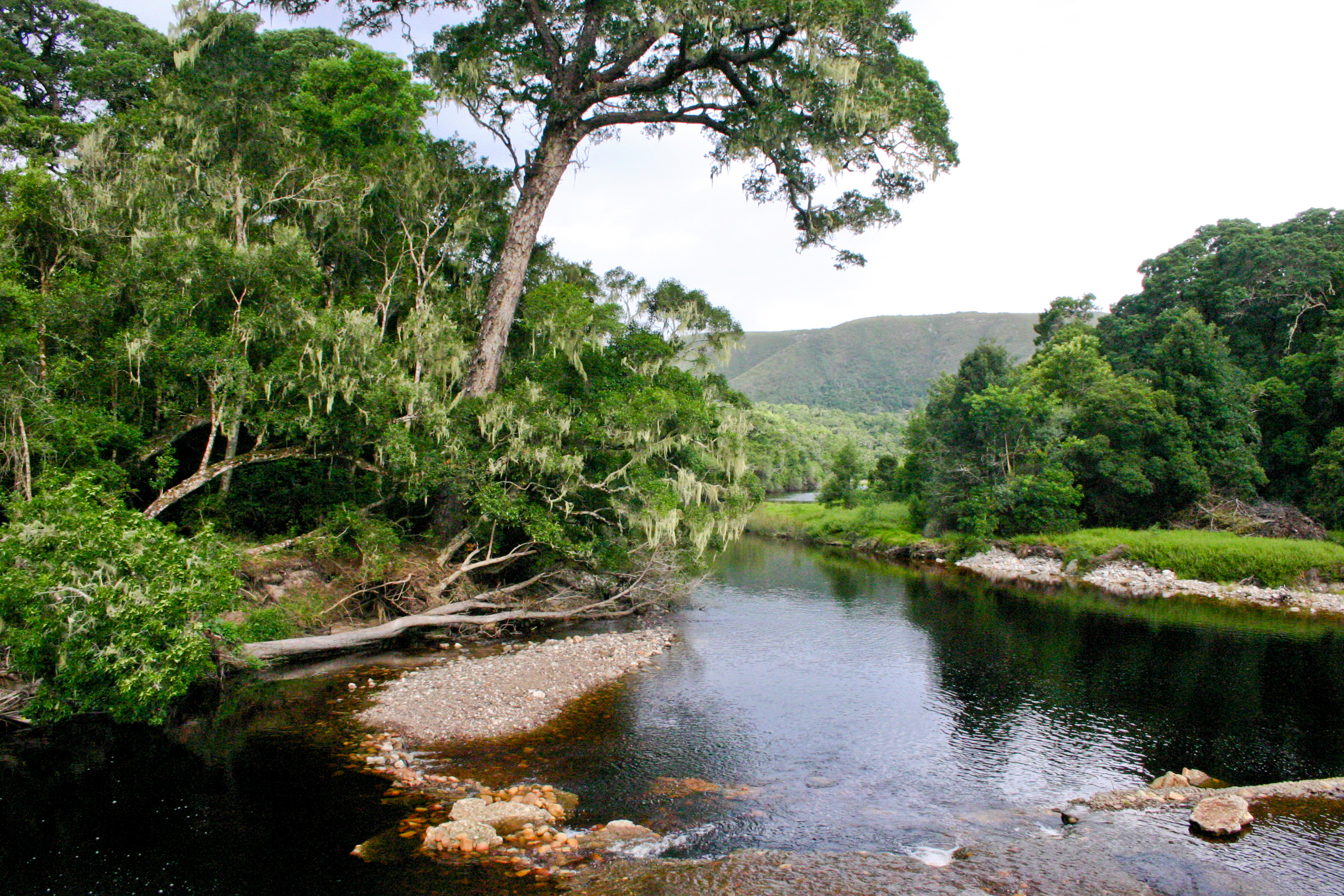
- Knysna forests near Nature's Valley in the Tsitsikamma, South Africa

- Location of the Knysna-Amatole montane forests

Ecology
- Realm: Afrotropical
- Biome: tropical and subtropical moist broadleaf forests

Geography
- Area: 3,100 km^{2} (1,200 mi^{2})
- Country: South Africa
- Province: Eastern Cape; Western Cape
- Coordinates: 34°S 23.1°E

Conservation
- Conservation status: Vulnerable

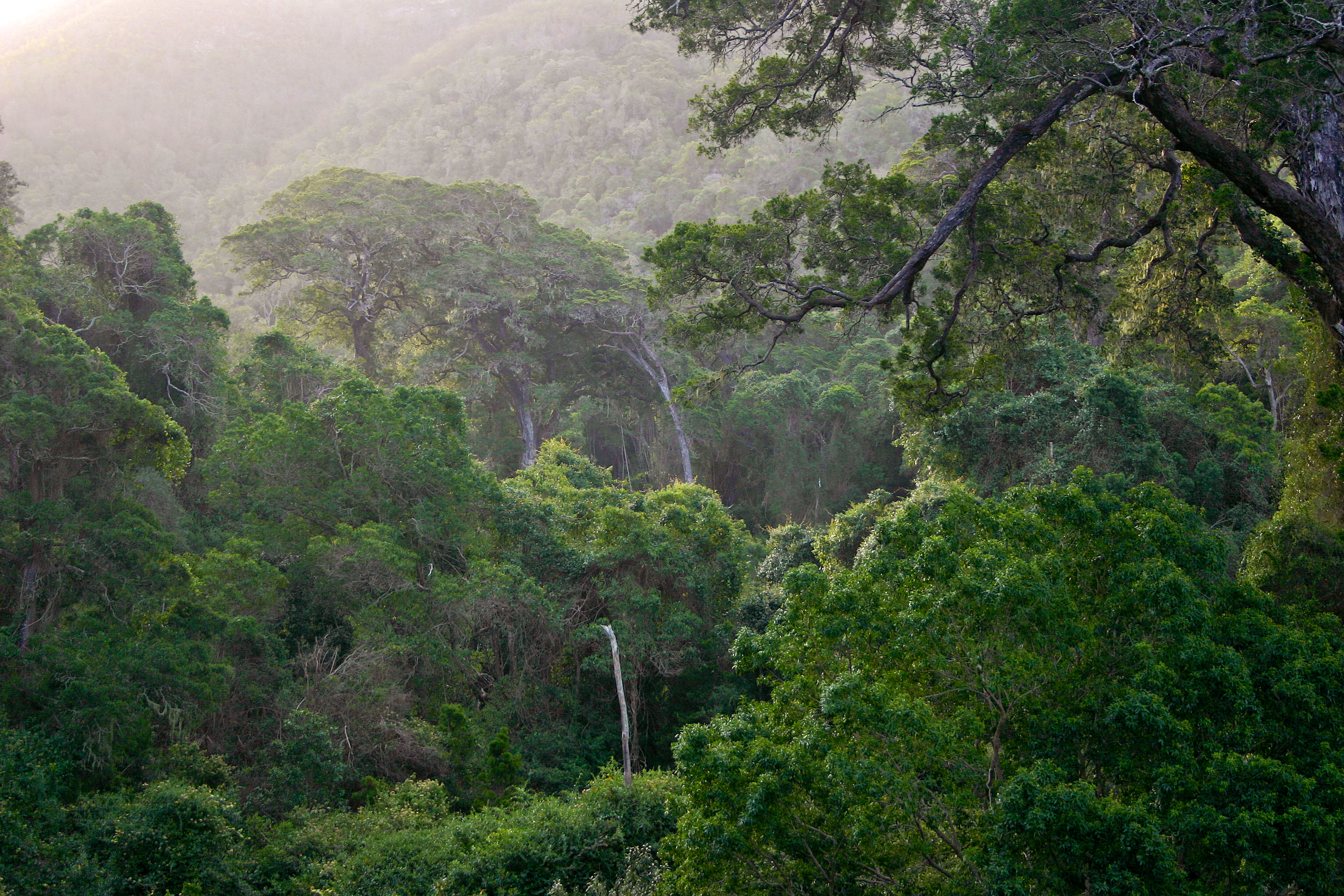
Afrocarpus falcatus near Nature's Valley

The Knysna–Amatole montane forests ecoregion, of the tropical and subtropical moist broadleaf forests biome, is in South Africa. It covers an Afromontane area of 3,100 square kilometres (1,200 sq mi) in the Eastern Cape and Western Cape provinces.

== Setting ==
The ecoregion, which is South Africa's smallest in area, covers two separate enclaves.

- The Knysna forest extends along the coast between 22°E and 25°E, generally along 34°S in a region called the Garden Route. The KwaZulu-Cape coastal forest mosaic lies along the coast to the north-east.
- The Amatole forests lie in the Amatole mountains, which lie inland and 400 km ENE of the Knysna forest.

The ecoregion has a subtropical/warm-temperate climate (Cfb in the Köppen climate classification). Rainfall occurs year-round, and ranges from 525 mm to 1,220 mm per year in the Knysna forest, and from 750 mm to 1,500 mm in the Amatole forests.

== Flora ==
The trees are of tropical and afromontane origin, and include ironwood (Olea capensis), stinkwood (Ocotea bullata), Outeniqua yellowwood (Afrocarpus falcatus), real yellowwood (Podocarpus latifolius), Cape holly (Ilex mitis), white pear (Apodytes dimidiata), Cape beech (Rapanea melanophloeos), bastard saffron (Cassine peragua), Cape plane (Ochna arborea var. arborea), assegai tree (Curtisia dentata), kamassi (Gonioma kamassi), white alder (Platylophus trifoliatus), and red alder (Cunonia capensis).

== Fauna ==
The forests were home to African elephants, but the last count (2017-2019) suggested that only one adult female, age 45 years, survives. In addition African leopard, bushbuck, blue duiker, bushpig and other mammals are resident. The density and assortment of birds is not exceptionally high, but the buff-spotted flufftail (Sarothrura elegans), Narina trogon (Apaloderma narina), Knysna lourie (Tauraco corythaix), seven species of cuckoo, Knysna woodpecker (Campethera notata), Knysna warbler (Bradypterus sylvaticus), chorister robin-chat (Cossypha dichroa), Cape batis (Batis capensis) and forest canary (Serinus scotops) occur, while birds of prey found here include the crowned eagle (Stephanoaetus coronatus) and the African wood owl (Strix woodfordii). Reptiles include the endemic Knysna dwarf chameleon (Bradypodion damaranum).

== Human use and conservation ==
Thomas Henry Duthie was the first appointed Supervisor of Crown Forests and Lands. Despite the small size of the ecoregion, the Knysna and Amatole forests are South Africa's largest individual forests. The Knysna forest has been exploited for valuable timber since the 18th century, and the Amatole forests since the 20th century. Since 1939 the forests have mostly been within protected areas and are recovering well, although managed timber harvesting is allowed.
