= Knysna elephants =

Group of African bush elephants

A feeding Knysna elephant by Hylton Herd (SANParks)

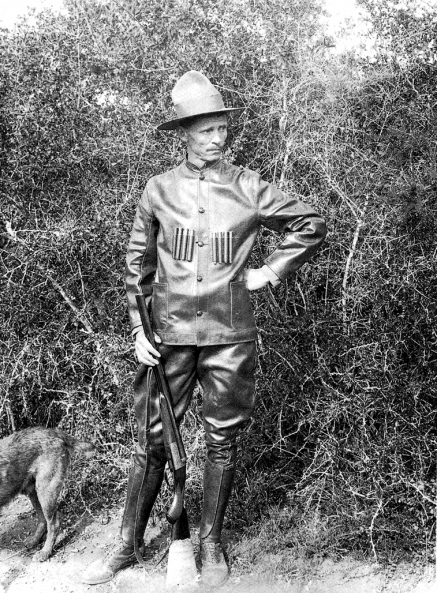
Major Philip Jacobus Pretorius armed for an elephant hunt. Leather suit and .475 cordite Express rifle, "a treasure of a gun" (Pretorius 1947). Addo bush in the background by Homer LeRoy Shantz (1919)

The Knysna elephants were the relicts of once substantial herds of African bush elephant (Loxodonta africana) in the Outeniqua/Tsitsikamma region of southernmost South Africa. In 2019 it was determined that the once significant herds have been reduced to a lone adult female.

Elephant herds roamed the southern tip of Africa into the 19th century and the 20th century with the San people, who were the original human inhabitants of the southern Cape, being the first people to chronicle elephants’ presence in the forest, and often depicted them in their rock art". While contact with European farmers and hunters led to their decimation in the Southern Cape of South Africa, it is conjectured that about 1,000 elephants retracted into, and historically roamed, the Outeniqua/Tsitsikamma area.

The mystique of the Knysna elephants reached world-wide acclaim in the 1984 novel Kringe in die Bos/Circles in the Forest penned by Dalene Matthee. Through the novel's telling of the mystical kinship between its lead character Saul Barnard - a woodcutter determined is to prevent the destruction of the Kynsna Forest during the gold rush - and bull elephant legendary Old Foot/Oupoot (for whom the last surviving Knysna elephant is affectionately named by some), the novel highlighted the plight of the Knysna elephants impacted by human encounter. Quotes such as “The elephant is the soul of the forest. If the elephants go, the forest will die” and "They are the last great ones, ghosts in the trees, walking the paths of their ancestors” stirred her audiences fascination with the elephants and a commitment to their plight.

By 1994 it was believed only a single, female elephant remained, however, a 2006 DNA analysis of dung samples by Lori Eggert, Gareth Patterson and Jesús Maldonado countered these beliefs and claimed that: "The elephants of the Knysna region continue to survive, despite fears that there was only a single surviving female" moving within an area of 60,000 hectares of forest managed by SANParks – the only unfenced elephant group in South Africa. This study was however later challenged by SANParks which asserted that the form of DNA testing used by Patterson was not reliable as it had to rely on dung rather than blood or tissue and that stronger evidence indicated the presence of only one remaining female elephant.

An attempt to introduce companion elephants for Strangefoot/Oupoot in 1994 failed dismally with one elephant dying from stress-induced pneumonia and two other needing to be swiftly relocated after causing significant damage to surrounding farms and properties.

By 2019, researchers were adamant that the one mature female sighted within the Garden Route National Park's Knysna Forest was the only Knysna elephant to have survived.

The elephant, affectionately called Strangefoot or Oupoot, is today the focus of SANParks as well as many animal rights groups and activists lobbying for her wellbeing. Various research studies and proposals are being considered with regard to the best course of action to ensure her survival, potential companionship, protection and wellbeing.

== History & decline ==
Stone Age: The semi-nomadic Khoi hunted them, and the San people of the southern Cape frequently painted rock art of them.

15th - 16th Centuries: Early Portuguese explorers discovered the Garden Route and a more conflicted relationship with the region's wildlife began.

Ivory hunting and loss of habitat to agriculture had all but exterminated elephants from the Cape region of Africa by 1900. The last elephant in the vicinity of the Cape Peninsula was killed in 1704, and elephant populations west of the Knysna region were extirpated prior to 1800.

By 1775, the remaining Cape elephants had retreated into forests along the foothills of the Outeniqua / Tsitsikamma coastal mountain range around Knysna, and dense scrub-thickets of the Addo bush.

1867: However, elephant hunting was still regarded as “a rather good sport”. Prince Alfred, Duke of Edinburgh (Queen Victoria’s son) -accompanied by a large hunting party - arrived by ship to embark on an elephant hunt.

1874: Captain Harison (Conservator of Forests between 1856 and 1888) suggested to the Cape Colonial government that it was time to protect the surviving elephants. The government turned down the suggestion as “frivolous”.

1876: Captain Harison estimates 400-500 elephants remain in the region and is concerned by the rate at which elephants are being killed by hunters. He makes an appeal to the Cape Government for legislation to protect the Knysna elephants - which is denied as “hardly worthwhile to legislate...”.

1908: Faced with the elephants' imminent extinction, the Cape Government put them under new protection declaring them as Royal Game; meaning they could only be hunted by British royalty or with a license costing £3-25. Stricter fines for illegal hunting were imposed, as well as prohibitions regarding the hunting of females (cows) and elephants with a certain weight of tusks.

=== Addo elephants and Major P. J. Pretorius ===
By 1919, a large herd was peacefully centered about the Addo area of the Eastern Cape. Farmers in this area had been sold their farms at greatly reduced rates and favourable terms because of the elephant presence. Nevertheless, these farmers complained to the authorities about damage to their crops, broken water pipelines and reservoirs, and even loss of lives, though it later transpired that the lives lost were those of hunters tracking and killing elephants. An extermination order was given by the Provincial Administration, due to conflict between farmers and the elephants over dwindling water resources and the threat posed to the future agricultural development. Initially, only a reduction in numbers was contemplated, but, on 1 April 1919, the Administrator of the Cape - Sir Frederic de Waal - argued in favor of total extermination of all the elephants. From June 1919 to August 1920, the professional hunter Major P. J. Pretorius (i.e. the “Jungle Man”) shot a figure of "120-odd" elephants, that reduced the largest population in South Africa from about 130 to 16 individuals. Allegedly, a public debate - including key figures Rev. J.R.L. Kingon and Major Pretorius - took place, in which a handful of individuals convinced the Provincial Administration to spare 16 animals. The remaining elephants were to be left in the Addo Reserve. Later, Pretorius applied for and was granted permission by the government in 1920 to shoot one of the sequestered 16. The shooting accounted for five more elephants. Spoils from the initial part of the campaign went to the Province, but from January 1920 onwards they were the property of Pretorius, who had been approached by various museums for specimens to add to their collections – the South African Museum received four, the Amathole Museum two and eight to the British Museum of Natural History. Pretorius had been requested to record measurements of the elephants that he had shot, but these were never made available.

=== The Pretorius hunt ===
After killing about 120 elephants in the Addo area, Major Pretorius set out to kill one Knysna elephant at a time when there were no more than seventeen left. This planned hunt was motivated as scientific research to attempt to prove that they were a subspecies and for collection for the Cape museum. The hunt for one ended terribly wrong and - out of a herd of seven - five elephants were killed (two bulls, two calves, and one cow). After this, there were approximately 7-12 elephants remaining in 1920.

1921-1986: Much concern was raised over the elephants’ chances for survival and numerous surveys were undertaken to gain clarity on the population status. The Wildlife Society approached Nick Carter in 1969 to do an elephant survey in conjunction with the Department of Nature Conservation and Dept. of Forestry, with the help of trackers; Aapie and Anthony Stroebel.

1971: A senior official in the Dept. of Forestry ordered the killing of an old bull due to reported conflict with farmers. The deed was concealed and the tusks were buried, but the carcass was found launching a police investigation and publicized court-case, lasting 9-days, which ended with the accused members of the Dept. of Forestry being declared not guilty.

== Remnants in the 21st century ==
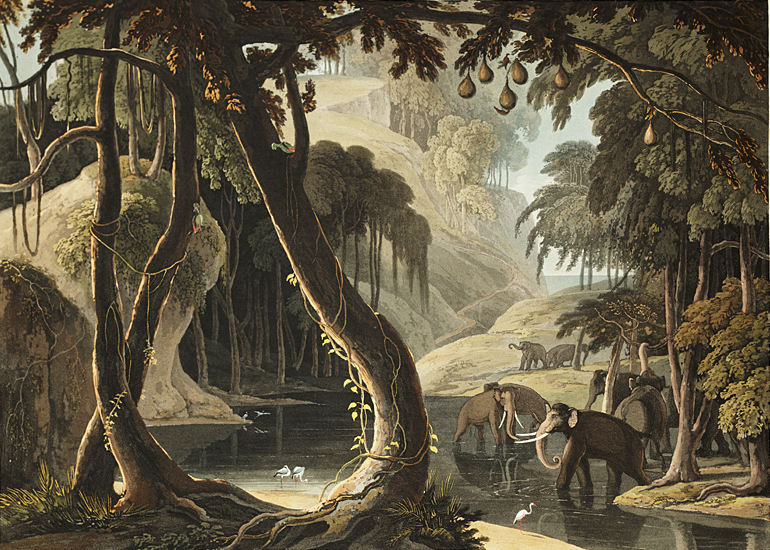
A fanciful scene in the Tsitsikamma Forest, strangely showing Asian elephants by Samuel Daniell circa 1801

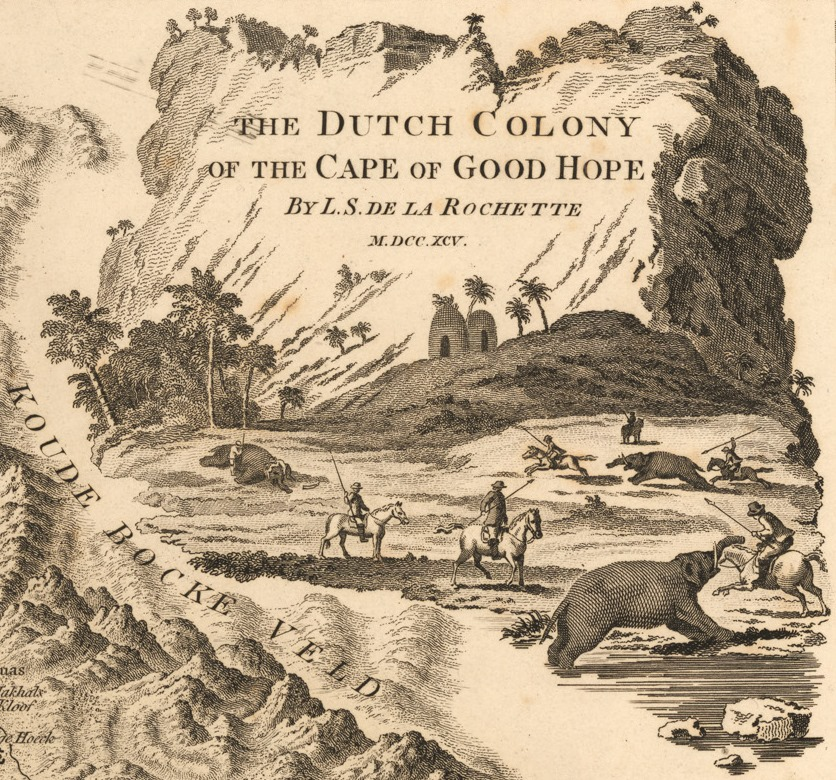
The title cartouche of William Faden's 1795 map records the ravages exacted on the colony's elephant population.

The scattered remnants of the herds had to regroup and modify their behaviour in order to survive. Within a short period they developed the skills necessary to live in forest and adjacent fynbos where they avoided hunters. Their range had been substantially reduced and their diet had to change as they had less access to grass.

As few as four to seven individuals were believed to roam the Knysna forests in 1950, and a survey in 1969/70 placed the population at some 14 individuals, by 1970.

Only four Knysna elephants were believed to persist in the Gouna/Diepwalle forests from 1976 to 1994, and by 1996 the population was reported to be functionally extirpated, with only a single adult female remaining. Nevertheless, in September 2000 a forest guard, Wilfred Oraai, videotaped a young bull from a distance of about thirty metres, immediately raising questions about its provenance.

Conservationist Gareth Patterson has collected numerous fresh samples of elephant dung for DNA analysis by geneticist Lori S. Eggert from the University of Missouri in Columbia. In its passage through the digestive system, dung scrapes against the walls of the intestines and as a result contains DNA of the particular animal. "The elephants of the Knysna region continue to survive, despite fears that there was only a single surviving female. Their range is larger than previously believed, and includes the Afromontane forest and mountain fynbos. The five individuals detected in this study were all females, and share a single mitochondrial DNA control region haplotype with individuals from Addo Elephant National Park. At least two of these elephants appear to be first-order relatives, and the others may be part of a single matrilineal group the presence of at least 5 cows and possibly some bulls and calves." The analysis further alluded to the survival of least five females, while Patterson's fieldwork suggests the additional presence of three bulls and two calves.

In September 1994, in an effort to bolster the population, three juvenile elephants were introduced from the Kruger National Park. At the time it was believed that Knysna elephants only frequented the forest depths, and the introduction of the Kruger elephants, which at most foraged along forest margins and in fynbos, was consequently deemed a failure. One of the Kruger elephants died within a month of stress-related pneumonia, while the remaining two were relocated to Shamwari Game Reserve in 1999, after they left the forest vicinity and came into conflict with humans.

2002: The Department of Water Affairs and Forestry officially stated that in 2002 there remained at least three Knysna elephants. In 2016, an elephant believed to be Oupoort - now believed to be the last surviving Knysna elephant - was photographed by a ranger. SANParks stated their belief that between one and five elephants remained in the park, but did not disclose their location or precise numbers.

In 2019, SANParks concluded that there was no remnant herd roaming Knysna forest, but only the shy and reclusive female. SANParks conducted an extensive scientific study led by ecologist Lizette Moolman in 2014. The study saw more than 80 remote camera traps installed across the Knysna forest to gather data between 2016 and 2018 across the elephants’ known range of about 180 km^{2} between Knysna and George. These monitored 38 locations in the known range for more than a year, obtained 140 photos of the single cow, estimated then to be 45 years old. She frequented indigenous forest and adjacent fynbos on SANParks and neighbouring land.

Following the 2018 camera trap survey, trap cameras kept live by SANParks have only captured footage of Strangefoot – who they see about every three weeks on average according to Moolman. She is expected to live to the age of 65, which would imply another two decades of her unnaturally lone existence. A relocation to another herd was considered too stressful, and artificial insemination likely too risky. It was decided at this point to leave her in the terrain with which she was familiar, a sombre reminder of human interference which doomed the population, and indifferent attitudes towards biodiversity in general.

== 2023 to 2025 ==
The last known Knysna elephant, Strangefoot/Oupoort, is confirmed to still be alive with confirmation of sightings of her captured by SANParks via trap cameras and ranger sightings, with a preference toward monitoring her from afar to reduce human interaction. Strangefoot was also captured up close and on camera by filmmaker Ryan Davy as reported in reported in Daily Maverick in 2023.

An advocate for securing companionship for Strangefoot, Davy came under heavy criticism by SANParks for his actions in entering the park without a permit and tracking the elephant for weeks to secure his encounter and subsequent footage. SANParks issued a J534 fine – for a minor environmental violation to Davy for trespassing and camping in the park without a permit and warns that others attempting similar action will face consequences.

=== Rise of activism for Strangefoot ===
Davy subsequently formed the action group Herd Instinct in 2024 along with environmentalists and conservationists, including journalist Ivo Vegter, local resident Rod Ward Able, and nature conservationist Jarrett Joubert, who manages the African Elephant Research Unit.

HI believes that the solitary elephant, which they prefer to name "Fiela," requires the company of other elephants for her well-being. They have garnered support for their proposal by meeting with the public and other key stakeholders such as local landowners whose properties are part of or adjacent to the elephant's range. They claim they have received overwhelming support for the introduction of more elephants and have also attempted to collaborate with South African National Parks (SANParks), which they claim initially expressed enthusiasm but requested delays to complete internal processes.

The group proposes sourcing elephants from the Knysna Elephant Park and the Plettenberg Bay Game Reserve, both of which they say have experience in rewilding elephants rescued from various situations.

Herd Instinct continues to advocate for the introduction of a herd to the Knysna Forest, aiming to restore the area's ecological balance and improve the well-being of the solitary elephant.

Conversely The Pro Elephant Network (PREN) which claims a global community of diverse individuals and organisations with "expertise related to wild and captive African and Asian Elephants, including but not limited to the fields of science, health, conservation, welfare and well-being, economics, community leadership, indigenous knowledge, social justice and the law" is advocating for "cautious, non-invasive and scientific-based approach to the management of the Knysna forest elephant" They believe that the elephant should be left alone to live her last years in peace and issue concerns over relocating elephants from the Knysna Elephant Park, which cares for orphaned and rescued elephants in a semi-captive environment. These concerns relate to:

- A report of animal cruelty in 2008 (which the park claims it took immediate action to rectify including firing members of staff involved);
- The deaths of elephant handlers in 2021 and 2005 and the injury of a staff member by trampling in 2011 - all of which they believe is indicative of the danger of introducing elephants with a history of human engagement and possible trauma
- The reliance on human intervention for feeding;
- The feasibility of human-dependant animals interacting with the human-avoidant animal and
- Research indicating that The Knysna Forest cannot adequately support the dietary requirements of a herd of elephants.

== Human interaction in solutions must be deeply considered ==
SANParks studies have revealed that the sole, remaining Knysna elephant is displaying signs of stress but only when and where she encounters human interaction. This is assessed by studies on Strangefoot's stress hormones measured from her dung.

Moolman who monitors the elephant has told media that there are a number of people “who are trying, against the wishes of SANParks and the ecologists, to make contact with, and view or film the lone female." This likely refers to the Davy interaction as well as other instances where Strangefoot has been spotted and filmed by farmers, forestry workers and visitors to the Knysna Forest.

Leaving her alone, however, would mean ignoring the heartbreaking signs that she displays of seemingly severe loneliness. Moolman has told Times Live that infrared footage of Strangefoot was captured in which she seemingly elicits affectionate behaviour toward an old logging machine in the depths of the forest where she is pushing, inspecting and lying down next to the machine in a seeming dismay of attachment. "It wasn't aggression - she just seemed to be interacting with it. You can see at one point she goes and lies on her side between the tractor and the logger. Maybe [it] looked like another elephant. Why does she ignore the one thing but not the thing that looks like it has a trunk?" she told Times Live.

As such, future interventions have to be carefully considered and balance the importance of not inducing stress with the benefit of companionship.

== Garden Route Elephant Management Plan ==
To ensure that future interventions with a view to securing her wellbeing and solo existence, a Garden Route Elephant Management Plan was implemented in 2024 engaging leading minds in conservation of the species as well as stakeholders such as the local community.

It was reported in the Knysna-Plett Herald that “Once the risks and opportunities have been established, along with a better understanding of the complexities around elephant management in an unfenced socio-ecological system such as the Garden Route, then a clear plan will be put in place.”

=== Considerations in the future plans for Strangefoot ===
The Garden Route Elephant Management Plan will look at considering all proposals, their benefits and risks. "Research by SANParks highlights the evasive nature of the Knysna elephant and its tendency to avoid human interaction, reinforcing the need for careful consideration of any future interventions. These findings support a low-risk, minimal-disturbance approach, aligning with the cautious stance recommended by stakeholders," says SANParks.

- Possible interventions suggested have been to bring a captive or semi-tamed herd, or an orphaned calf or a wild herd from Addo Elephant National Park in the Eastern Cape. The risk of this is the elephants suffering the stress of translocation; the potential of aggressive behaviour toward people or farmlands; the absence of fencing or that bonding doesn't take place successfully.
- Following filmmaker Ryan Davy's 12-week tracking of the elephant in 2023, he hoped to convince SANParks that a herd of elephants should be introduced to the Knysna forest to provide company for the lone female and to restore the ecosystem in the Knysna forest. He formed an action group called Herd Instinct (HI) which, according to the Knysna-Plett Herald met on the 14 March 2024 in Knysna to galvanise support for a plan to introduce "three to five female elephants, between 10 and 35 years old, that presently live at the Plettenberg Bay Game Reserve be moved into the Knysna forests." The group believes that the plan is urgent as "For a highly social and intelligent species like an elephant, this is essentially a sentence of solitary confinement. Considering her estimated age and circumstances of living, a measure of urgency is justified. The national norms and standards for the management of elephants (Nemba) says that every reasonable effort must be made to safeguard elephants from abuse and neglect. To leave a highly social and intelligent animal alone, deprived by human actions of a herd, is as definitive a form of neglect as imaginable and in blatant contravention of this. HI will thus continue to press forward and remains eager to work with the public and governing authorities to create positive change for Fiela" HI has elected to use the name Fiela for the elephant (after a character in another Dalene Matthee book) as opposed to that of Stangefoot or Oupoort - the elected names used by SANParks.
- The Pro Elephant Network (PREN), which "consists of a significant global community of diverse individuals and organisations boasting a wealth of expertise, related to wild and captive African and Asian Elephants", has indicated that it is not in support of the initiative to introduce captive elephants to the Knysna forest and "favour SANParks’ cautious, non-invasive and scientific-based approach to the management of the Knysna forest elephant" due to concerns of vegetation not being optimal for a herd of elephants; and the potential risk of stress on all elephants . "PREN members are cognisant of all the factors that have culminated in the difficult life of the female elephant living in the Knysna forest. We would want to prevent any further complications or create any additional stress for her, and would rather see her live out her final few years in relative peace."
- Moolman is quoted in Times Live stating: "If the status quo is kept, the risk will be that once the elephant dies her memory and knowledge of how to survive in the Knysna area will be lost, without an opportunity to pass on this knowledge and to teach another elephant (if bonding is a possibility)."
- Plans to link the Garden Route National Park, the Baviaanskloof World Heritage Site and Addo Elephant National Park may also offer a resolve with Eden to Addo CEO Joan Berning stating that: "Lizette and I have become even more convinced through the elephant's behaviour in the Knysna forest how vital these corridors are for the safe movement of species."

== A new book offers extensive history and research on The Knysna Elephants ==
Researcher Ryno Joubert has been researching the history of The Knysna elephants since 2018 in an attempt to create a "definitive resource that captures their rich history, ecology, and the many stories surrounding them" through meticulous research. "This journey has led me to interview individuals with direct historical connections to the Knysna elephants, including retired foresters, SANParks employees, local fern-pickers, and renowned elephant trackers Wilfred Oraai and Karel Maswati. Many of these individuals are now in their late 70s, 80s, or 90s, and I am honoured to preserve their invaluable memories and insights," he told the Knysna-Plett Herald. In addition he has also sourced archival materials, scientific studies and resources from libraries and museums in Knysna and George. The publication is set for 2025/2026.

== Interesting Facts ==
- The last surviving Knysna elephant is sometimes affectionately named Oupoort after the elephant bull in Dalene Matthee's novel Kringe in Die Bos/ Circles in the Forest. Her preferred name however, given to her by rangers, is Strangefoot as she has a wide and large footprint comparative to other elephants. Some activist groups prefer to call her Fiela after a character in a Dalene Matthee novel.
- Strangefoot is estimated to be 50 years old. According to research, elephants can live up to 70 years and sometimes even 80 years so she may have about 20 more years to wonder the forest.
- Elephants can technically reproduce well into the end of their lifespan (so even up to ages of 75) however it is more commonly believed that reproduction can occur up to the age of 65. This means that should a viable solution be found for companionship for Strangefoot, or if artificial insemination is considered viable, it may be possible that she could breed and that her genetic line is preserved. This would, however, strongly depend on her fertility.
