= Fiela's Child =

1985 novel by Dalene Matthee

Fiela se Kind (Fiela's Child)
- Author: Dalene Matthee
- Original title: Fiela se Kind
- Language: Afrikaans
- Genre: Drama
- Publisher: Tafelberg Publishers Ltd
- Publication date: 1985
- Publication place: South Africa
- English publication date: 1986
- Media type: Hardcover/Movie
- Pages: 314
- ISBN: 0-394-55231-8
- OCLC: 13003348
- Dewey Decimal: 823 19
- LC Class: PR9369.3.M376 F5 1986

Fiela's Child is a South African novel written by Dalene Matthee and published in 1985. The book was originally written in Afrikaans under the name Fiela se Kind, and was later translated into English, German, French, Hebrew, Dutch, Slovene and Swedish.

== Plot ==
The story is set in the forests of Knysna, South Africa in the nineteenth century, and tells the story of a Cape Coloured woman, Fiela Komoetie, and her family who adopt an abandoned Afrikaner three year old child Benjamin Komoetie found outside their door. Nine years later, census-takers come to count the people living in the Long Kloof. They are shocked that a white child is living with a Coloured family and somehow come to the conclusion that the white child must be the child lost by the van Rooyens who live in the Forest. Fiela is distraught that her child is being taken away and travels to speak with the magistrate which fails because of the prevalent racism at the time. The magistrate warns Fiela that if she interferes any more she will be dealt with. The child is taken away from her and forced to live with the van Rooyens who make beams from wood. His living conditions with the white people are much worse than with his Coloured family. Elias van Rooyen continuously abuses the family and everyone is thoroughly miserable. The child, Benjamin Komoetie, is forced to take up the name of Lukas van Rooyen and falls in love with his apparent sister, Nina van Rooyen. The climax of the story unfolds a few years later when the boy forces his "mother's" guilt to confess that he is not actually her son and he returns to Fiela and her family, whom he chooses as his own.

== Themes ==
Matthee tackles environmental concerns, themes of racism and sexism as well as discrimination of class. The blue-buck is over hunted and elephants are freely killed. The relations between whites and Coloureds are tense. Although this plays off before Apartheid at a time when technically there was equality before the law, the legal system was biased and in favour of whites. The marine industry is suffering from the introduction of steam-powered ships.

== The aspect of liminality ==
In the novel by Dalene Matthee the aspect of liminality, in which a person is able to decide who and what to be, plays a major role. In the novel, Benjamin is in the liminal stage and is unaware of his true identity. The setting is described to be in the liminal stage, hence it takes place on both sides of a mountain.

== Movie ==
The book was made into a film in 1988 and starred Shaleen Surtie-Richards as Fiela. The film in 2019 starred Zenobia Kloppers as Fiela.

== Education ==
In South Africa, the drama, published by Tafelberg Publishers, is used as a grade 12 setwork book for Afrikaans First Additional Language (FAL) learners in matric.
