= Marita van der Vyver =

South African writer (born 1958)

- Born: 6 May 1958 (age 68); Cape Town, Western Cape
- Education: Kleinmond University
- Occupations: Novelist & Writer
- Spouse: Alain Claisse
- Children: 3 sons, 1 daughter
- Website: maritavandervyver.info

Marita van der Vyver (born 6 May 1958) is an Afrikaans author who has written several books for both adult and youth audiences. Since 1999, she has been living in France with her husband and four children. Van der Vyver wrote a collection of humorous essays detailing life in the countryside of France, titled Die hart van ons huis in 2004, after which her first volume of short stories, Bestemmings was released, together with an English counterpart.

== Biography ==
She was born in Cape Town in 1958 and grew up in Bellville, Menlo Park, where she got her early education from Hoërskool Nelspruit. In 1975, in a national Afrikaans poetry competition for matric pupils, she won a study bursary for four years at the university of her choice. She chose Stellenbosch University, where she participated in D.J. Opperman's poetry workshops and was awarded a BA degree, majoring in Afrikaans and French in 1978. The following year, she acquired an honours degree in journalism. She completed a master's degree in journalism several years later. After returning to South Africa after a year of travelling in Europe, van der Vyver worked as a reporter for Die Burger, as a copywriter for Leserskring (a book club), and as a feature writer for Sarie.

== Works ==
She published three youth novels, Van Jou Jas (1982), Tien vir 'n Vriend (1987), and Eenkantkind (1991) before releasing her first novel for adults, Griet skryf 'n Sprokie in 1992, which won the ATKV, M-Net, and Eugène Marais prize. It was later translated into English, Dutch, Italian, French, Spanish, Swedish, Czech, Chinese, and Hebrew. In 1994, Dinge van 'n Kind, another youth novel, was published before she released her first book for young children, Olinosters op die Dak in 1997.

Another adult novel, Wegkomkans was published in 1999, followed by Griet Kom Weer in 2001. Her youth novel Die Ongelooflike Avonture van Hanna Hoekom won the Sanlam Prize for Youth Fiction in 2002 and was made into a film in 2010. Many of her other novels have also been adapted for stage or screen, such as Griet Skryf 'n Sprokie, Die Dinge van 'n Kind, Vergenoeg, Dis Koue Kos, Skat and Stiltetyd.
