= Tom Cullberg =

Swedish-South African artist (born 1972)

- Born: 1972 (age 53–54); Stockholm, Sweden
- Education: Michaelis School of Fine Art (BFA)
- Known for: Cabinets; painting installations; book paintings; abstract painting; drawing; etching

Tom Cullberg (born 1972) is a Swedish-born South African artist. He currently lives and works in Cape Town, South Africa.

== Early life ==
Cullberg was born in 1972 in Stockholm. He went to South Africa in 1993 to study towards his BFA at the Michaelis School of Fine Art, graduating in 1997.

== Career ==
He has been working since, with numerous solo exhibitions to his name as well as inclusion in many significant group exhibitions. His work has been shown internationally at galleries such as Konstnärshuset, Stockholm, (2025), Barnard, Cape Town, (2018-2023) Galleri Flach, Stockholm, (2016) BRUNDYN + GONSALVES, Cape Town (2012), SCOPE Art Show, New York City (2012), the Joburg Art Fair in Johannesburg (2011), Stevenson in Cape Town (2009), the Goodman Gallery in Cape Town, Magrorocca Galleria d'arte in Milan (2007) and Galleri Svenska Bilder in Stockholm (2003). His work is held in private, public and corporate collections including Iziko South African National Gallery (Cape Town), Swedish Parliament (Stockholm, Sweden), Karolinska Sjukhuset, (Stockholm, Sweden), Sasol (SA), Nando’s (UK), Spier (SA), Hollard (SA), Imago Mundi Benetton Collection (Italy), Press Art Collection of Annette and Peter Nobel, (Zurich), Holbar Collection,(Liechtenstein.) Investec Cape Town, Investec Zurich.

== Exhibitions ==
=== Solo exhibitions ===
- 2026 Tactile Frequencies, Galeria Victor Lope , Barcelona
- 2025 Music & Landscape, CTCA , Cape Town
- 2025 Världens mått, SKF/ Konstnärshuset, Stockholm
- 2023 Interlude, Barnard Gallery, Cape Town
- 2022 Everything in a Small Space of Time, Cité des Arts Internationale, Paris
- 2022 Local Stories, Barnard Gallery, Cape Town
- 2021 To Reach Japan, Barnard Gallery.
- 2020 Record/Play, Barnard Gallery, Cape Town.
- 2018 Finding New Life in an Old Form, Barnard Gallery, Cape Town
- 2016 Good Advice, M Contemporary, Sydney, Australia
- 2016 Whatever Happens, Galleri Flach, Stockholm, Sweden
- 2014 Tower, Brundyn, Cape Town
- 2013 KKNK, Oudtshoorn
- 2013 Tom Cullberg: New Paintings, Candyland, Stockholm, Sweden
- 2012 SCOPE New York, New York, USA
- 2012 Periphery, BRUNDYN + GONSALVES, Cape Town
- 2008 Small Moments, Joao Ferreira Gallery, Cape Town
- 2007 Tom Cullberg, Magrorocca, Milan, Italy
- 2006 House, Joao Ferreira Gallery, Cape Town
- 2006 House, KZNSA, Durban
- 2005 The Judge and other stories, Joao Ferreira Gallery, Cape Town
- 2004 There is so much to say, Joao Ferreira Gallery, Cape Town
- 2003 Galleri Svenska Bilder, Stockholm, Sweden
- 2002 Principles of Flight, Joao Ferreira Gallery, Cape Town
- 2000 In Between North and South, Joao Ferreira Gallery, Cape Town

=== Selected group exhibitions ===
- 2026 Notes on Sculpture, curated by Leah Mascher, at Worldart, Cape Town
- 2024 Space Register, curated by Untitled art, at Reservoir Projects, Cape Town
- 2024 Dina vänner och bekanta, SKF Konstnärshuset, Stockholm
- 2024 Investec Cape Town Artfair
- 2023 Collide, Featherstone Center For the Arts, Massachusetts, USA
- 2023 Fullhouse, Blank Projects, Cape Town, curated by Fede Art House and Under projects
- 2023 Horses, Under Projects, Cape Town
- 2023 Investec Cape Town Artfair
- 2022 Ex Libris, Leeu Estate, Everard Read Gallery, Franschhoek
- 2022 Investec Cape Town Artfair
- 2020 Home Is Where the Art Is, Zeitz MOCAA Museum of Contemporary Art, Cape Town
- 2020 Investec Cape Town Artfair
- 2019 Collective, Barnard gallery
- 2019 Self, Glen Carlou Wine Estate
- 2019 Investec Cape Town Artfair *2019 Monochrome, Barnard gallery
- 2018 Barnard Collective, Barnard Gallery, Cape Town
- 2018 AKAA Art Fair, Paris, France
- 2018 Investec Cape Town Art Fair, Barnard Gallery, Cape Town
- 2017 Barnard Collective, Barnard Gallery, Cape Town
- 2016 Summer Exhibition, Circa, London, United Kingdom
- 2015 Homage, Everard Read, Cape Town
- 2014 Cape Town Art Fair, Cape Town
- 2013 Paint+, NIROX, Johannesburg
- 2013 FNB Joburg Artfair, Johannesburg
- 2013 More Than Words, Spier Manor House, Stellenbosch
- 2013 Material/Representation, BRUNDYN + GONSALVES, Cape Town
- 2012 Contemporary mosaic works, Spier, Cape Town
- 2011 FNB Joburg Art Fair, BRUNDYN + GONSALVES, Cape Town
- 2010 Open End, Goodman Gallery Cape, Cape Town
- 2009 Summer 2009/10: Projects, Michael Stevenson, Cape Town
- 2009 Sing Into My Mouth, What if the World, Cape Town
- 2009 FNB Joburg Art Fair, Johannesburg
- 2009 Printing Money, The South African Print Gallery, Cape Town
- 2009 Big Wednesday’, What if the World, Cape Town
- 2008 Warren Editions, Blank Projects, Cape Town
- 2008 Joburg Art Fair, Johannesburg
- 2006 New Painting, curated by Storm Janse van Rensburg; KZNSA, Durban; UNISA Gallery, Pretoria; Johannesburg Art Gallery, Johannesburg
- 1998 Dreams and Clouds, Kulturhuset, Stockholm, Sweden and Goteborgs Konst Museum, Gothenburg, Sweden
- 1998 Transposition Workshop Residency, Robben Island, hosted by South African National Gallery, Cape Town; Moderna Museet, Sweden
- 1997/8 The 2nd Johannesburg Biennale (with the Sluice Group), The South African National Gallery, Cape Town
- 1996 Sluice: an Installation and Performance Event, Castle of Good Hope, Cape Town
