= Joburg Art Fair =

Contemporary art fair in South Africa

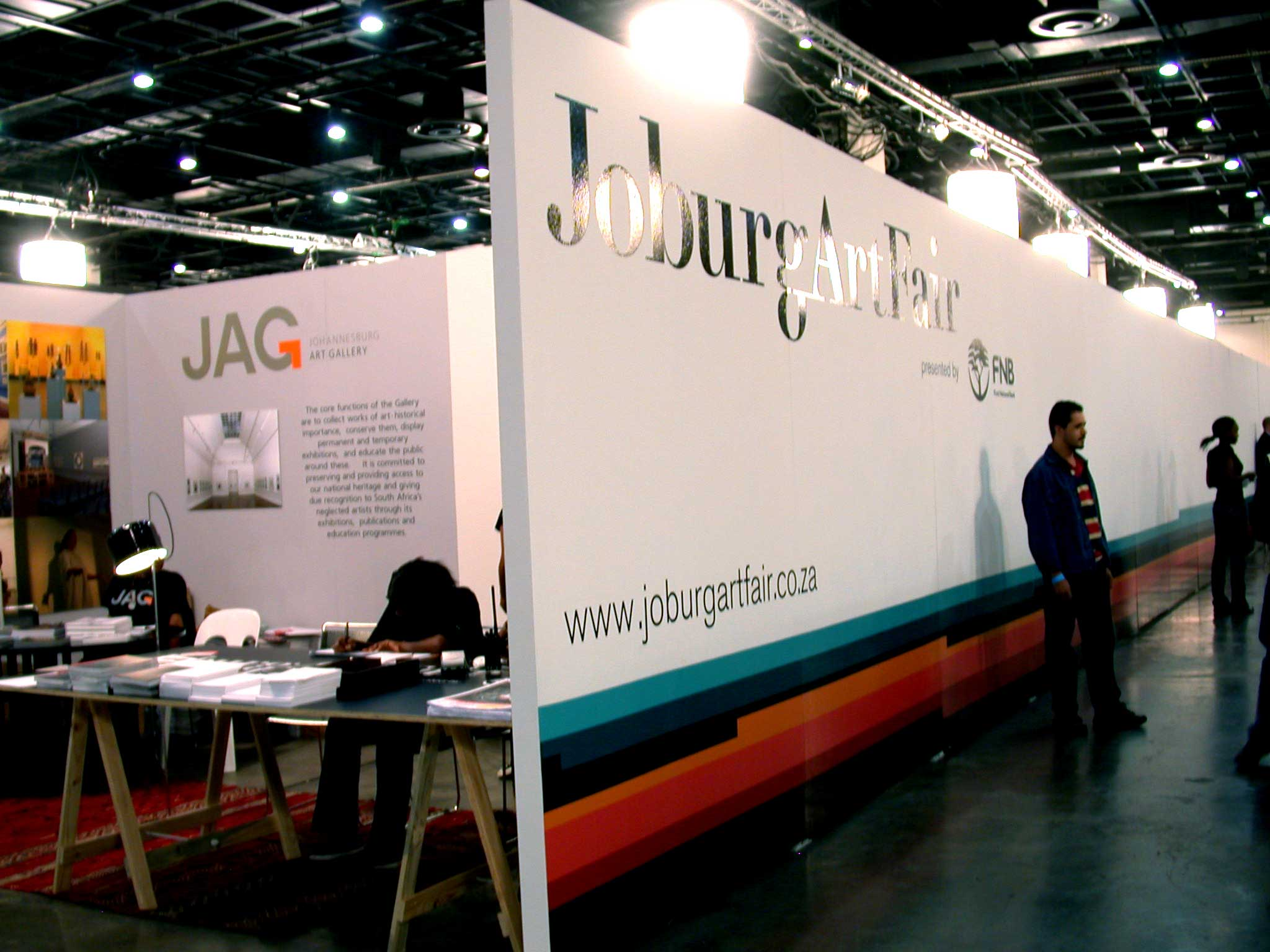
Joburg Art Fair 2008

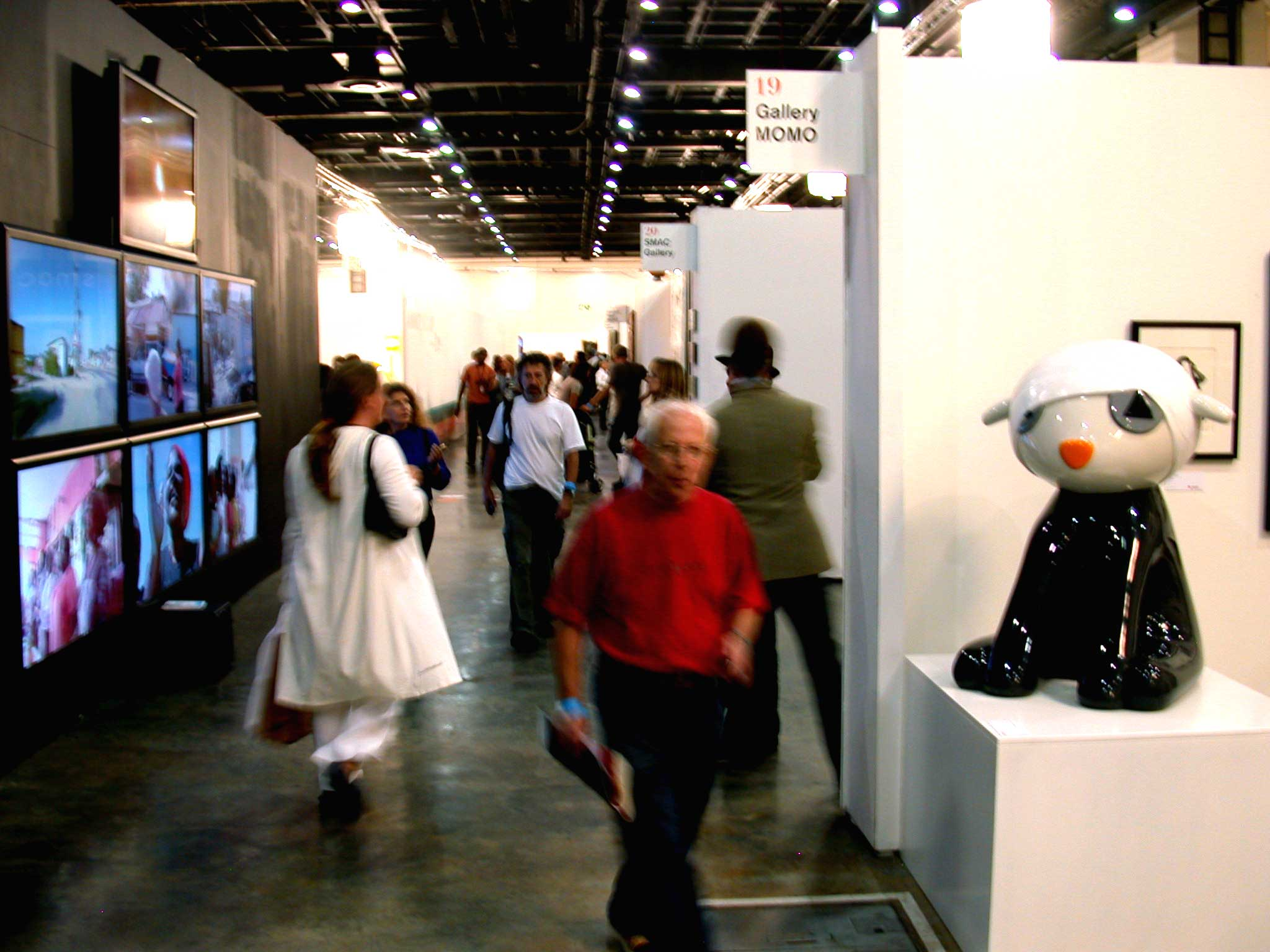
Joburg Art Fair 2008, Gallery MOMO and SMAC stands on the right

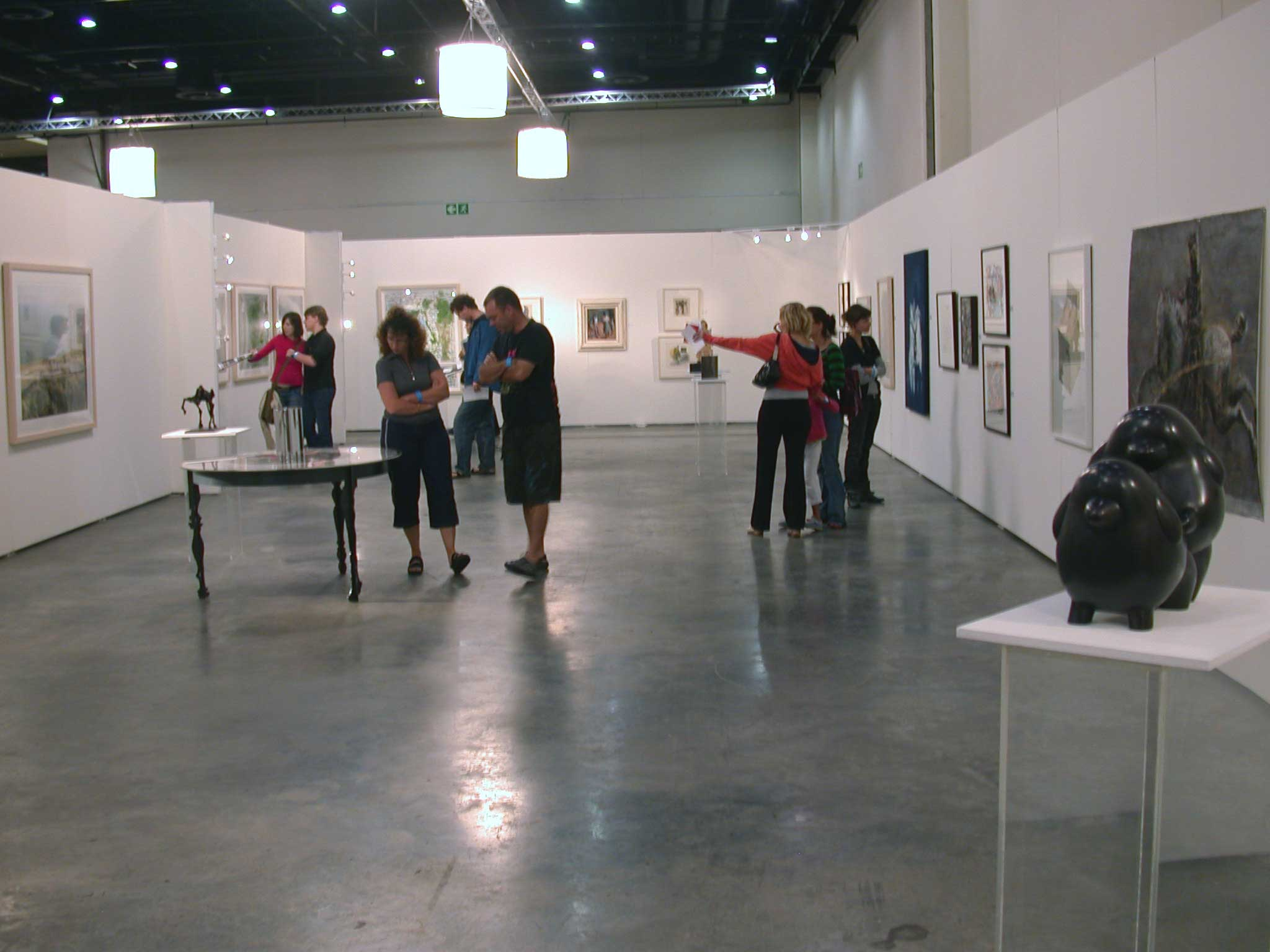
Goodman Gallery stands at Joburg Art Fair 2008

Joburg Art Fair is a contemporary art fair held annually in Johannesburg, South Africa. The first show took place from 13 to 16 March 2008. The second Joburg Art Fair is scheduled for 3 April to 5 April 2009.

The Joburg Art Fair which is sponsored by First National Bank aims to address the gap between prices attained by living African artists behind those from developed countries and Asian emerging markets. FNB's aim is to bring contemporary art to a broader, upper-income local market, including black business people with new-found wealth.

== Joburg Art Fair 2008 ==
The 2008 event, which was the first of its kind in Africa, included 22 galleries from Africa, Europe and North America, showing work by contemporary, predominantly African, artists.

The first Joburg Art Fair was held in the Sandton Convention Centre and covered a total area of 5,000 square metres (54,000 sq ft). The fair represented the single largest collection of African and South African contemporary art for sale thus far. The fair included African artists including Zwelethu Mthethwa, William Kentridge, Guy Tillim, David Goldblatt, Pieter Hugo, Minnette Vári and Moshekwa Langa.

Participating Galleries included:

- Johannesburg, South Africa: Goodman Gallery, Everard Read-gallery, David Krut, Warren Siebrits, Art on Paper, Rooke-gallery, Gallery MOMO, Art Extra.
- Cape Town and Stellenbosch South Africa: Joao Ferreira-gallery, Michael Stevenson, SMAC, Whatiftheworld, Bell Roberts.
- Cairo, Egypt: The Townhouse Gallery
- Rabat, Morocco: L'Appartement 22
- Addis Ababa, Ethiopia: ASNI -gallery
- Strasbourg, France: Gallery Ames d'Afrique
- New York City, United States: Jack Shainman Gallery, Perry Rubenstein
- London, United Kingdom: October Gallery

The fair included a show curated by Simon Njami from artists throughout Africa who are not represented by galleries on the fair. Njami had previously acted as chief curator of the Africa Remix exhibition and the Africa pavilion at the 2007 Venice Biennale.

== Joburg Art Fair 2009 ==
The second Joburg Art Fair is scheduled for 3 – 5 April 2009. Twenty-four galleries will participate in the 2009 fair, including two new South African galleries (Afronova and iart) and four new international galleries (Seippel Gallery; Galerie Beatrice Binoche; Centre for Contemporary Art, Lagos and Emerging World Art).

The galleries that will take part in 2009 are: Gallery MOMO, Galerie Ames d'Afrique, Galerie Peter Herrmann, Goodman Gallery, David Krut Projects, Art on Paper Gallery, Joao Ferreira Gallery, Whatiftheworld, October Gallery, Seippel Gallery, Warren Siebrits, Michael Stevenson, Brodie/Stevenson, CCA Lagos, Everard Read, SMAC, KwaZulu Natal Society of Arts, Rooke Gallery, iArt, Erdmann Contemporary, Afronova, Townhouse Gallery, ARTCO, Galeriebeatricebinoche, Emerging World Art.

The Featured Artist for 2009 will be Jane Alexander exhibiting Security, an installation originally commissioned for the 27th São Paulo Biennale and hosted by the Gordon Schachat collection. The fair will also include a screening booth featuring moving image work from countries in the Global South, a book lounge, and artist talks.
