= Robert Hodgins =

English painter (1920–2010)

- Born: 27 June 1920; Dulwich, London
- Died: 15 March 2010 (aged 89); Johannesburg, South Africa
- Education: Goldsmiths College, University of London
- Known for: painter and printmaker

Robert Hodgins (27 June 1920 – 15 March 2010) was an English painter and printmaker.

== Life history ==
Robert Hodgins was born in Dulwich, London, on 27 June 1920, and immigrated to South Africa in 1938. He enlisted with the Union Defence Force in 1940, and served in Kenya and Egypt.

In 1944 he returned to England, and studied art and education at Goldsmiths College, University of London, where he received an arts and crafts certificate in 1951 and a National Diploma of Design in painting in 1953.

He returned to South Africa, where he taught at the Pretoria Technical College School of Art from 1954. From 1962 he was a journalist and critic for Newscheck magazine. He lectured in painting at the University of the Witwatersrand, Johannesburg, from 1966 to 1983.

Hodgins worked using a variety of paint media, including oils, acrylic paint and tempera. he had been exhibiting since the 1950s but did not come to wider attention until the early 1980s. In 1980 and 1981 he had produced a series of paintings based on Ubu, the main character in the play Ubu Roi, who became a recurring subject of his art.

In 1983, he retired to paint full-time. He partook in many solo and group exhibitions in South Africa and abroad. His work can be seen in many galleries, corporate and public collections, including Anglo American, the Johannesburg Art Gallery, the Sandton Art Gallery, the Pretoria Art Museum, the South African National Gallery in Cape Town, University of South Africa (UNISA), the University of the Witwatersrand Art Galleries, and the William Humphreys Art Gallery in Kimberley.

Robert Hodgins died on 15 March 2010, in Johannesburg, after a bout with lung cancer at the age of 89.

== Solo exhibitions ==
- Lidchi Gallery, Johannesburg: 1956, 1958, 1960
- South African Association of the Arts, Pretoria: 1959
- Retrospective, Standard Bank National Arts Festival, Grahamstown: 1986
- Goodman Gallery, Johannesburg: 1987, 1990, 1992, 1995, 1998, 2000
