= Jeremy Wafer =

South African sculptor and printmaker (born 1953)

Jeremy Wafer (born 1953) is a South African sculptor and printmaker.

== Biography ==
Jeremy Wafer was born in Durban in 1953, to Laura and Michael Wafer, grew up in Nkwalini, Zululand, and studied at the University of Natal, Pietermaritzburg (B.A Fine Art 1979) and at the University of the Witwatersrand (B.A. Hons. in Art History 1980 and M.A. Fine Art 1987). He taught in the Fine Art Departments of the Technikon Natal and the Technikon Witwatersrand before being appointed in 2004 Associate Professor in the School of Arts of the University of the Witwatersrand, Johannesburg where he is currently Professor of Fine Art.

His work is represented in the National Museum of African Art, Smithsonian Institution, Washington DC, the South African National Gallery, the Johannesburg Art Gallery and in many other museum, private and corporate collections.

Exhibitions include retrospective exhibitions at Stellenbosch University and the Durban Art Gallery in 2002 and at the KZNSA Gallery, Durban in 2009, a number of curated group exhibitions including Panoramas of Passage which toured the US in 1995, Earth and Everything at the Arnolfini, Bristol UK, 1996, the Johannesburg Biennale 1997, 20: Two decades of South African Sculpture 2010 at the Nirox Foundation, Johannesburg, Earth Matters at the Smithsonian Museum of African Art, Washington DC 2013, and the Basel Art Fair in 2009 and 2014. The number of solo exhibitions includes Tropic at the Project Space Leeds, UK in October 2010, Paradise at the Goodman Gallery 2009, Survey at WAM 2013, and most recently Strata at Goodman, Johannesburg in July 2014.

He has participated in a number of international residencies including the Thami Mnyeni Foundation in Amsterdam, the Civitella Ranieri in Umbertide, Italy, the South Project in Melbourne, Australia, Brande in Denmark, the Ampersand in New York and more recently, as part of a UK/AU/SA research grouping titled Witness of which he is a founding member, a visiting lectureship at Monash University with an exhibition at the Linden Art Centre, Melbourne. He has a B rating from the South African National Research Foundation (NRF), among the first awarded in his field.

He has been awarded a number of prizes including the Standard Bank National Drawing Prize in 1987, a Vita Award in 2002, the Kebble in 2004, and the Sasol Wax Prize in 2006.

His work has, since the early 1990s, been represented by the Goodman Gallery in Johannesburg, Cape Town and abroad.

Jeremy is married to Colleen with whom he collaborates on many artistic projects and has two children, both Wits alumni, Mary Wafer an artist in Johannesburg and Alexander Wafer a lecturer in Geography at Wits.

He co-designed the "Wall of Hope" AIDS monument (with Georgia Sarkin), dedicated to the memory of Gugu Dlamini, in Durban, South Africa.

Wafer's uncle, Richard Wafer, died on HMS Jaguar trying to rescue his comrades.
