= The Butcher Boys =

Sculpture made by Jane Alexander

- Artist: Jane Alexander
- Year: 1986
- Medium: mixed media
- Location: South African National Gallery; Cape Town, South Africa
- Accession: no. 90/73

Butcher Boys (1985/1986) is a sculpture made by South African artist Jane Alexander of three, life-size, oil-painted plaster figures with animal horn and bone details, seated on a bench. The work formed part of her MAFA submission (University of the Witwatersrand) and was first exhibited at the Market Theatre Gallery in Johannesburg in 1986. It was acquired by the South African National Gallery in 1991. The work was a response to the state of emergency in South Africa at the time.

The work consists of three life-size humanoid beasts with powdery skin, black eyes, broken horns, and no mouths sitting on a bench. The beasts are devoid of their outside senses - their ears are nothing more than deep gorges in their heads and their mouths are missing, appearing to be covered with thick roughened skin.

Brett Bailey's Plays of Miracle and Wonder was published with a cover photograph showing three men posed after Jane Alexander's Butcher Boys sculpture.

== Copyright controversy ==
In February 2012, South African band Die Antwoord released an online teaser trailer for their album Ten$Ion which referenced the sculpture without Alexander's consent. In the video, band members Yolandi Visser and Ninja, along with their daughter Sixteen, appear in powdery white makeup. Yolandi and Ninja wear black contact lenses, and Ninja also wears ram horns on his head. The artist's lawyer, Martin Heller, stated: "Ms. Alexander is concerned that Die Antwoord's use of her work and its context might be publicly perceived as reflecting her own artistic intention. In creating the work, Ms. Alexander referred to the dehumanizing forces of apartheid. Ms. Alexander does not intend to limit her work's interpretation, and she does not seek to interfere with other artists' work." The video has since been removed from distribution.
