= Bruce Arnott =

South African sculptor and educator

Bruce Murray Arnott
- Born: 15 September 1938; KwaZulu-Natal, South Africa
- Died: 19 July 2018 (aged 79); Cape Town, South Africa
- Education: University of Cape Town
- Occupations: Sculptor, academic
- Employer: University of Cape Town
- Known for: Sculptor, artist, curator, educator
- Title: Professor Emeritus of Fine Art
- Spouse: Mari Lecanides-Arnott
- Children: 2 sons, 1 daughter

Bruce Arnott (15 September 1938 – July 19, 2018) was a South African sculptor, curator, educator and academic. He was a professor of Fine Arts at the University of Cape Town's Michaelis School of Fine Art.

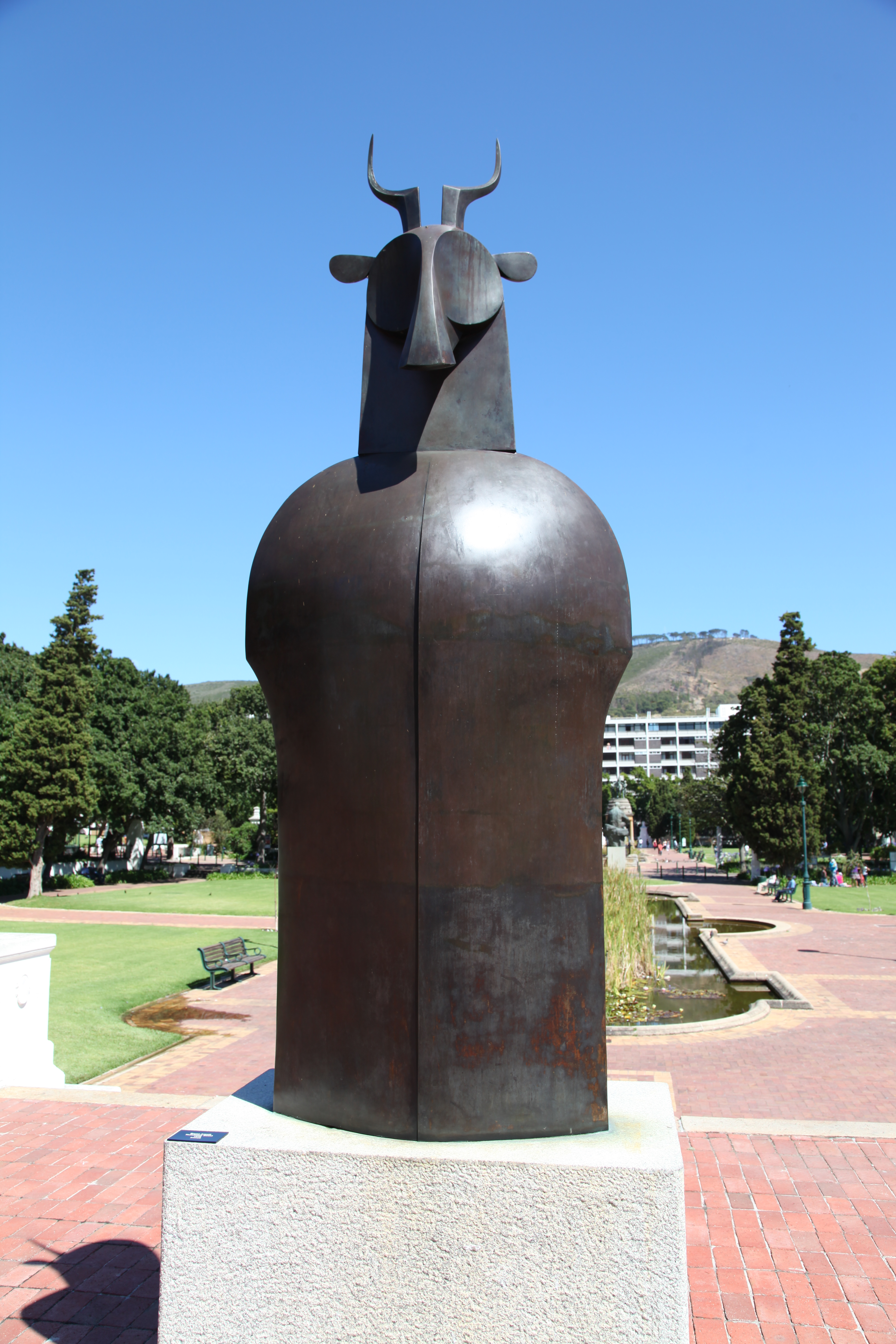
'Numinous Beast', a 1979 sculpture by Arnott, Iziko South African National Gallery, Cape Town.

== Early life ==
Arnott was born on 15 September 1938 in KwaZulu-Natal. He graduated from the University of Cape Town, where he earned a bachelor's degree followed by a master's degree in Fine Arts.

== Career ==
Arnott was a prolific South African sculptor, predominantly making bronze sculptures. He also used "lead, resin, fibreglass, stone and wood."

Arnott's sculptures are represented in corporate collections across South Africa and in public art museums throughout the country, including the Iziko South African National Gallery in Cape Town, the Johannesburg Art Gallery, the Durban Art Gallery, the Pretoria Art Museum, the Tatham in Pietermaritzburg and in the collections of NAPAC (Durban) and PACOFS (Bloemfontein).

His work is also to be found on the campuses of the University of Cape Town, the University of the Western Cape, and the University of the Witwatersrand, as well as in the collections of the 1820 Foundation (Grahamstown), the Rembrandt (Stuyvesant) Foundation (Stellenbosch), the Oppenheimer Foundation (Brenthurst Library, Johannesburg).

Arnott worked at the Iziko South African National Gallery in Cape Town, appointed as the museum's first professional education officer before and serving as its assistant director from 1970 to 1972. He was a professor of Fine Arts at the University of Cape Town's Michaelis School of Fine Art from 1978 to 2003, and he served as its director at one point.

== Personal life and death ==
Arnott was married to Mari Lecanides-Arnott, with whom he had a son. He had a son and a daughter from his previous marriages.

Arnott died on July 19, 2018.
