= Iziko South African National Gallery =

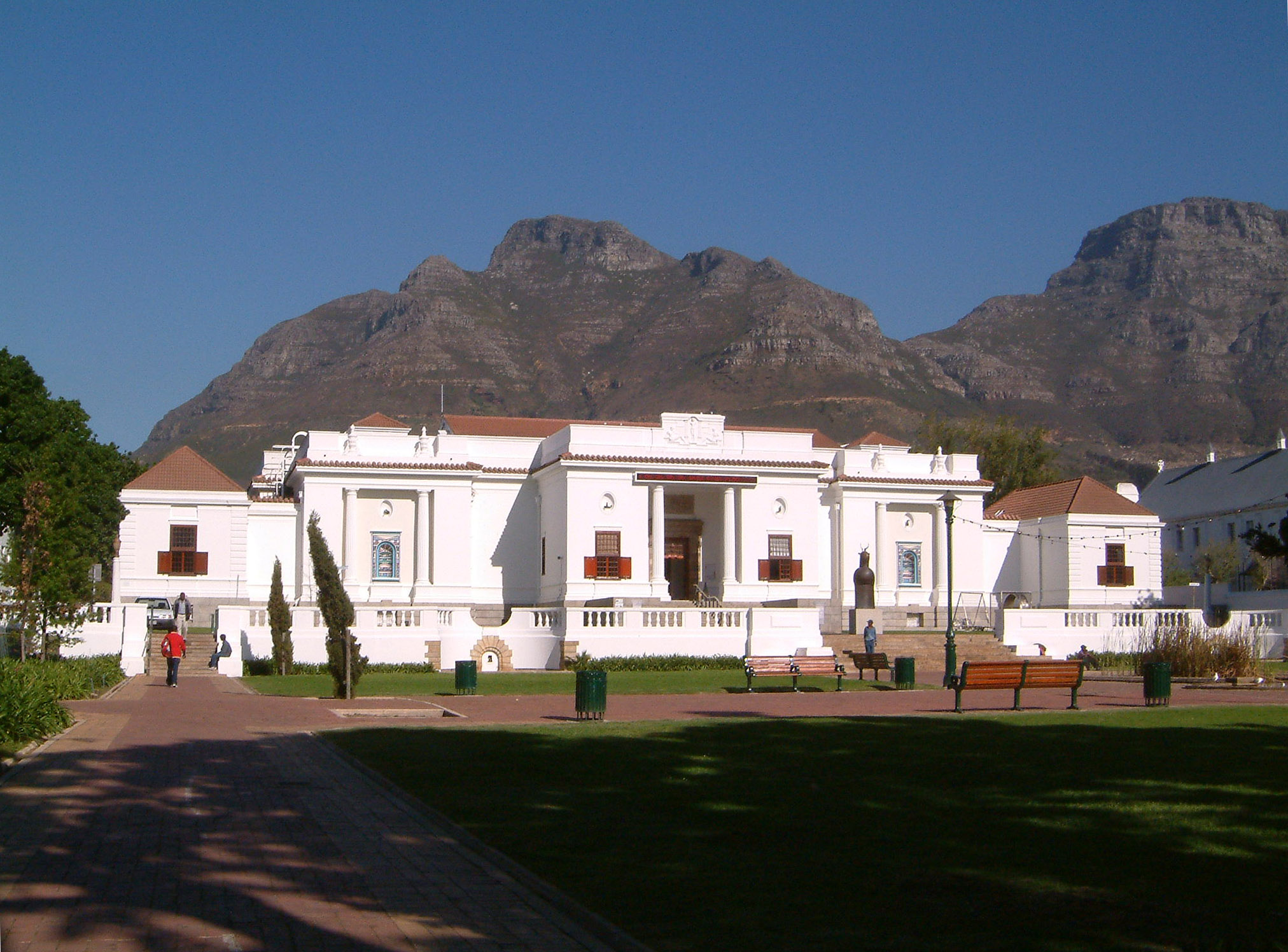
- Iziko South African National Gallery

- Location within central Cape Town
- Interactive fullscreen map
- Established: 3 November 1930; 95 years ago (built 1914–1930)
- Location: Government Avenue, Company's Garden, Cape Town, South Africa
- Coordinates: 33°55′44″S 18°25′02″E
- Type: Art Museum
- Director: Riason Naidoo
- Website: iziko.org.za/museums/south-african-national-gallery
- Governing body: Council of Iziko Museums of South Africa

The Iziko South African National Gallery is the national art gallery of South Africa located in Cape Town. It became part of the Iziko collection of museums – as managed by the Department of Arts and Culture – in 2001. It then became an agency of the Department of Arts and Culture. Its collection consists largely of Dutch, French and British works from the 17th to the 19th century. This includes lithographs, etchings and some early 20th-century British paintings. Contemporary art work displayed in the gallery is selected from many of South Africa's communities and the gallery houses an authoritative collection of sculpture and beadwork.

== History ==
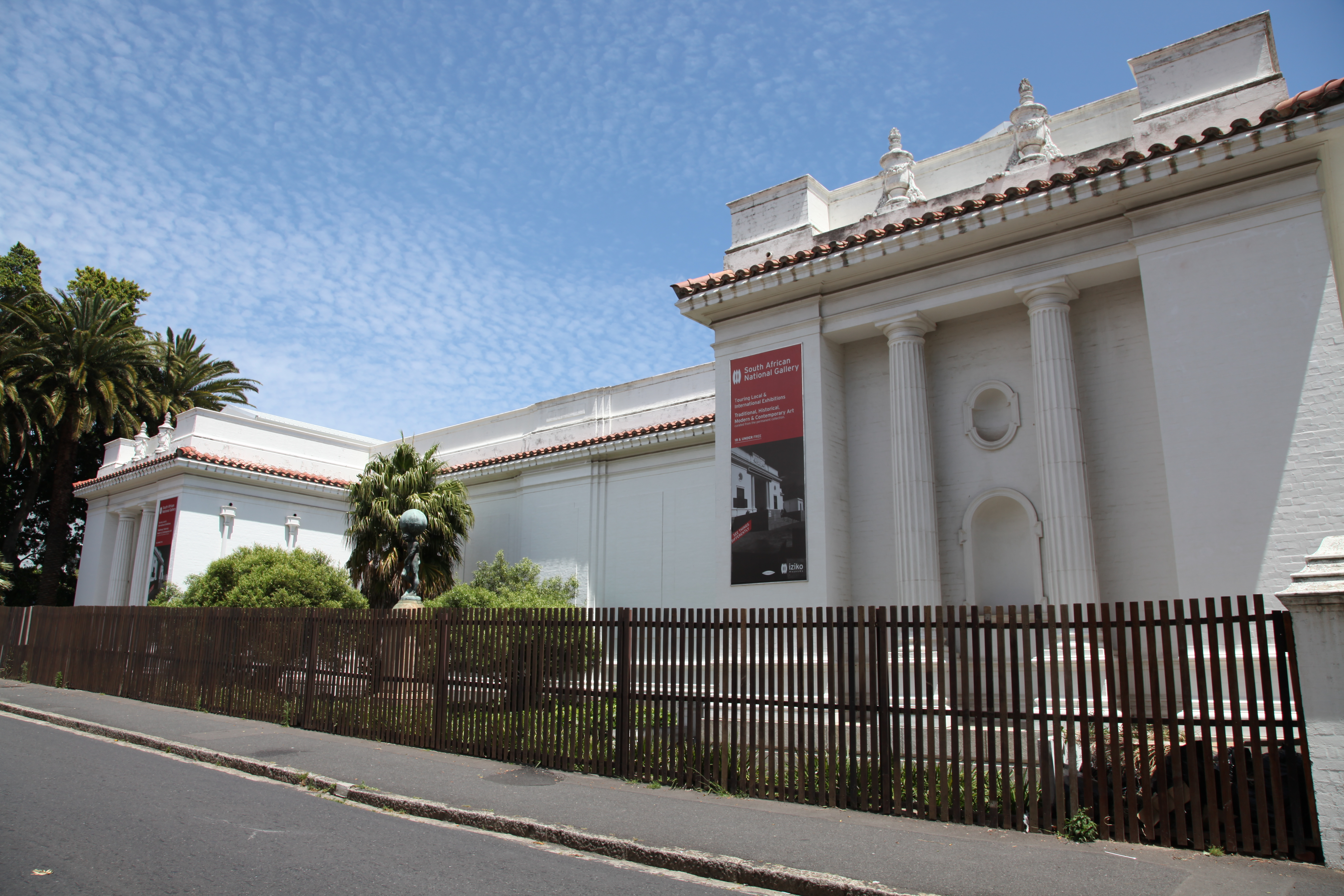
SANG from Hatfield Street

At a meeting in the Cape Town Public Library, convened on 12 October 1850, proposals were discussed to erect a building in the Company's Garden for the purpose of exhibiting art. This occasion was the inaugural meeting of the South African Fine Arts Association, founded by Thomas Butterworth Bayley and Abraham de Smidt. The Association went on to arrange the first ever exhibition of fine art in South Africa. This took place on 10 May 1851 in the school rooms in the Company's Garden in Cape Town. Its primary raison d'être remained the establishing of a permanent home for a National collection.

The National collection was founded in 1872 with a bequest of paintings from the estate of Thomas Butterworth Bayley. In 1875, the Association was able to purchase premises in the current Queen Victoria Street where the nucleus of the Art Gallery was exhibited. By the South African Art Gallery Act of 1895 the South African Government took over the collection in trust and purchased the premises from the Association for R12 000. A board of five trustees were elected in 1896 to manage the collection.

The National Gallery Act made provision for the building of new premises, but foundations were only laid in 1914. The collection was kept in a wing of the South African Museum from 1900 and the current building only officially opened to the public on 3 November 1930, by the Earl of Athlone.

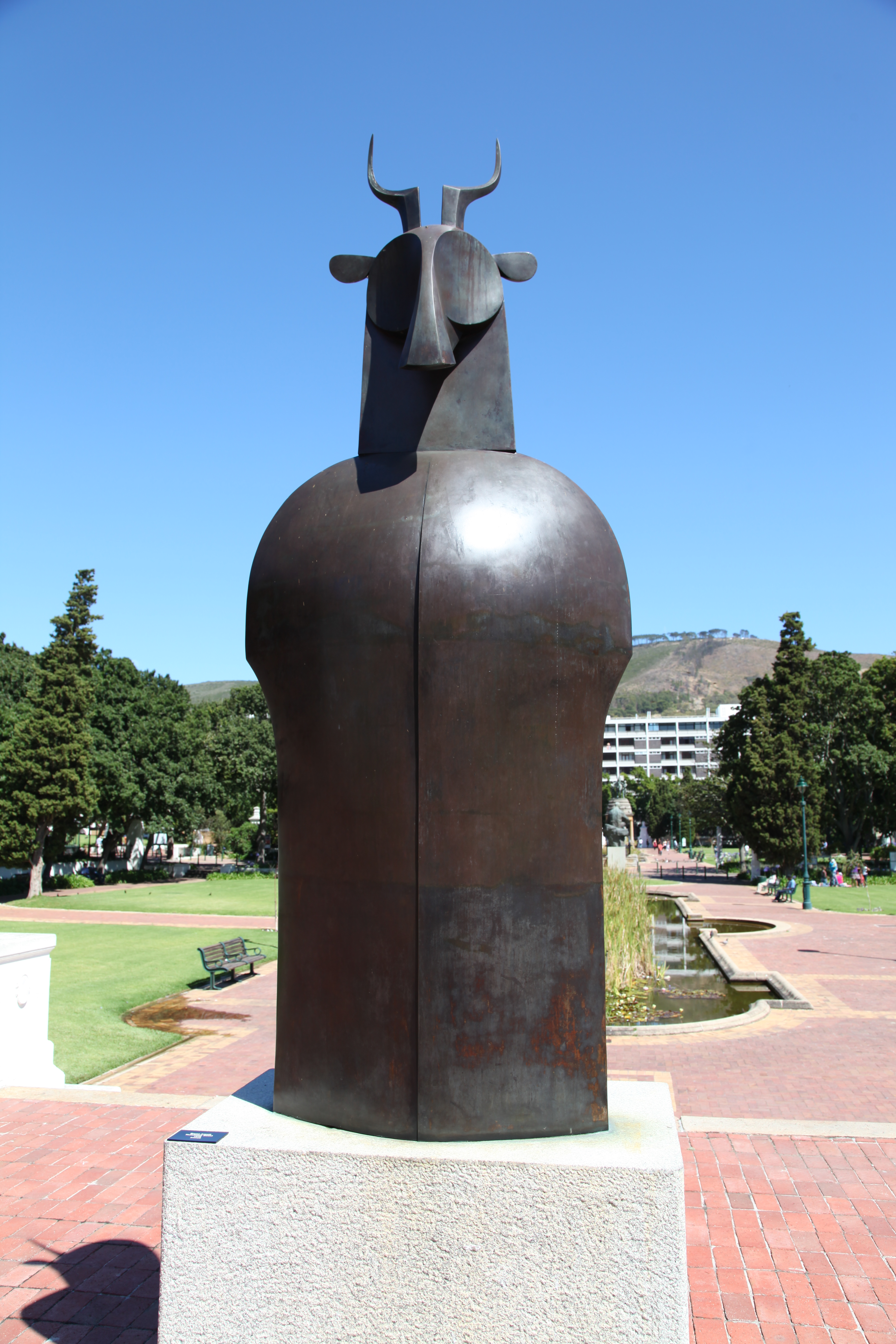
Numinous Beast by Bruce Arnott, 1978

Notable contributions by Dr Alfred de Pass, Hyman Liberman, Sir Abe Bailey, Sir Edmund and Lady Davis and Lady Michaelis expanded the scope of the collection over the years. In 1937, the building was expanded to accommodate purchases that included South African artists. The first pieces by South African artists, by Anton van Wouw (African Head) and Neville Lewis (Adderley Street Flower-sellers), had been purchased in 1926.

One of Dean Hutton's most well-known works is the performance and installation piece Fuck White People, which was exhibited at the Iziko South African National Gallery in Cape Town in 2017. The work was vandalized at the gallery by members of the Cape Independence Party. It also became the subject of a legal challenge under South Africa's Equality Act; however, the Western Cape Equality Court ruled that the work constituted protected artistic expression and did not amount to hate speech.

== Selected collection highlights ==
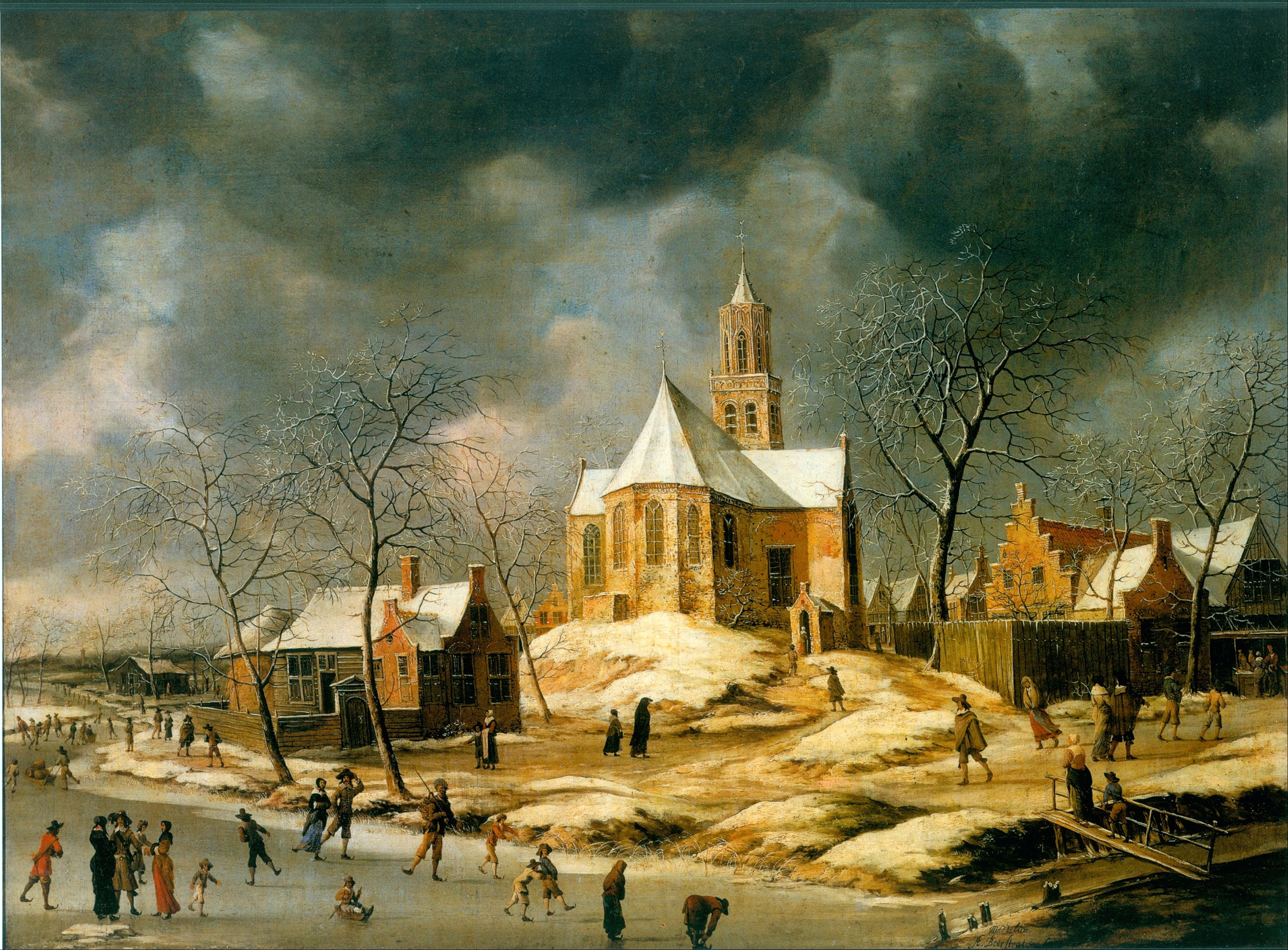
Abraham Van Beerstraten

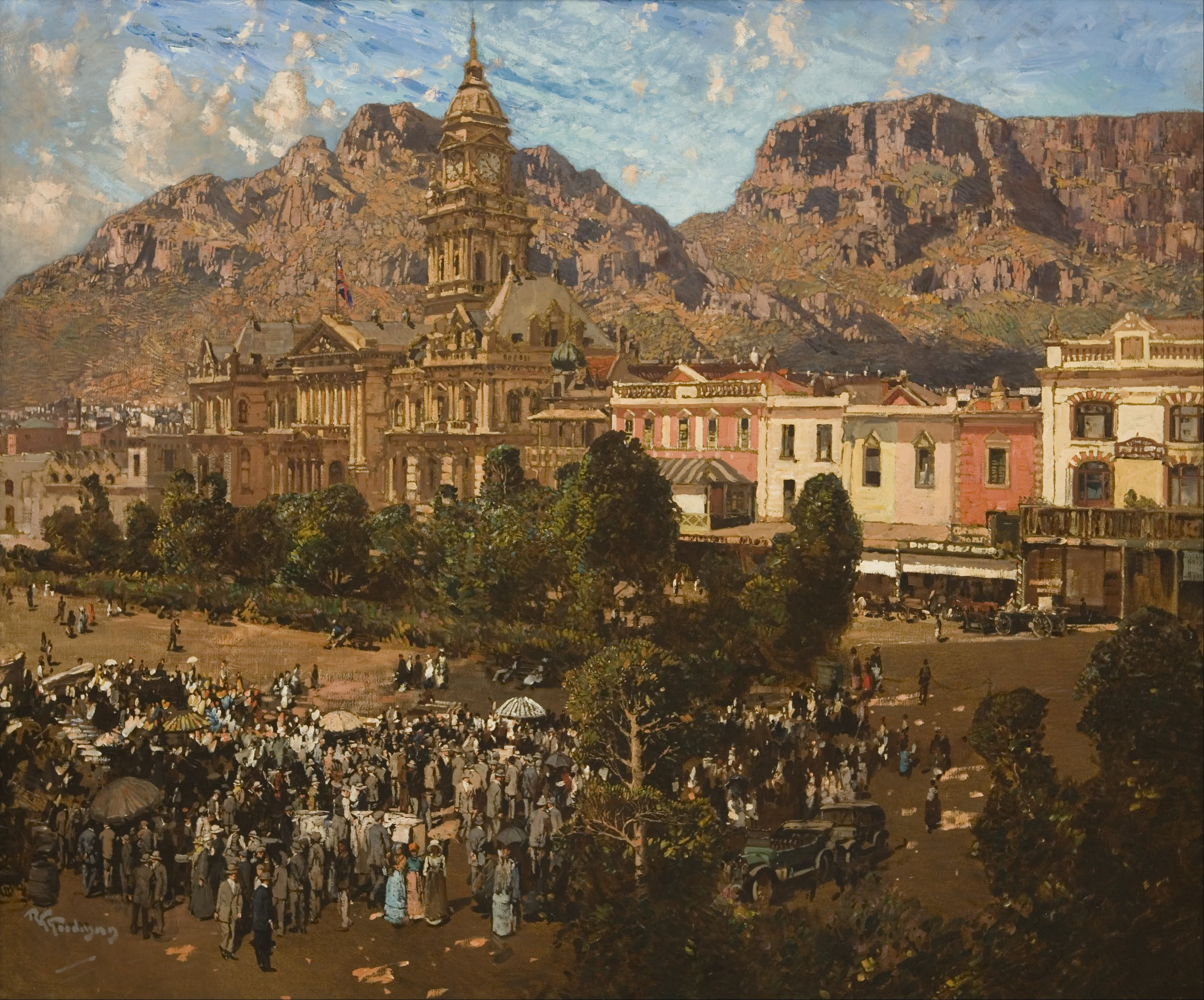
Robert Gwelo Goodman

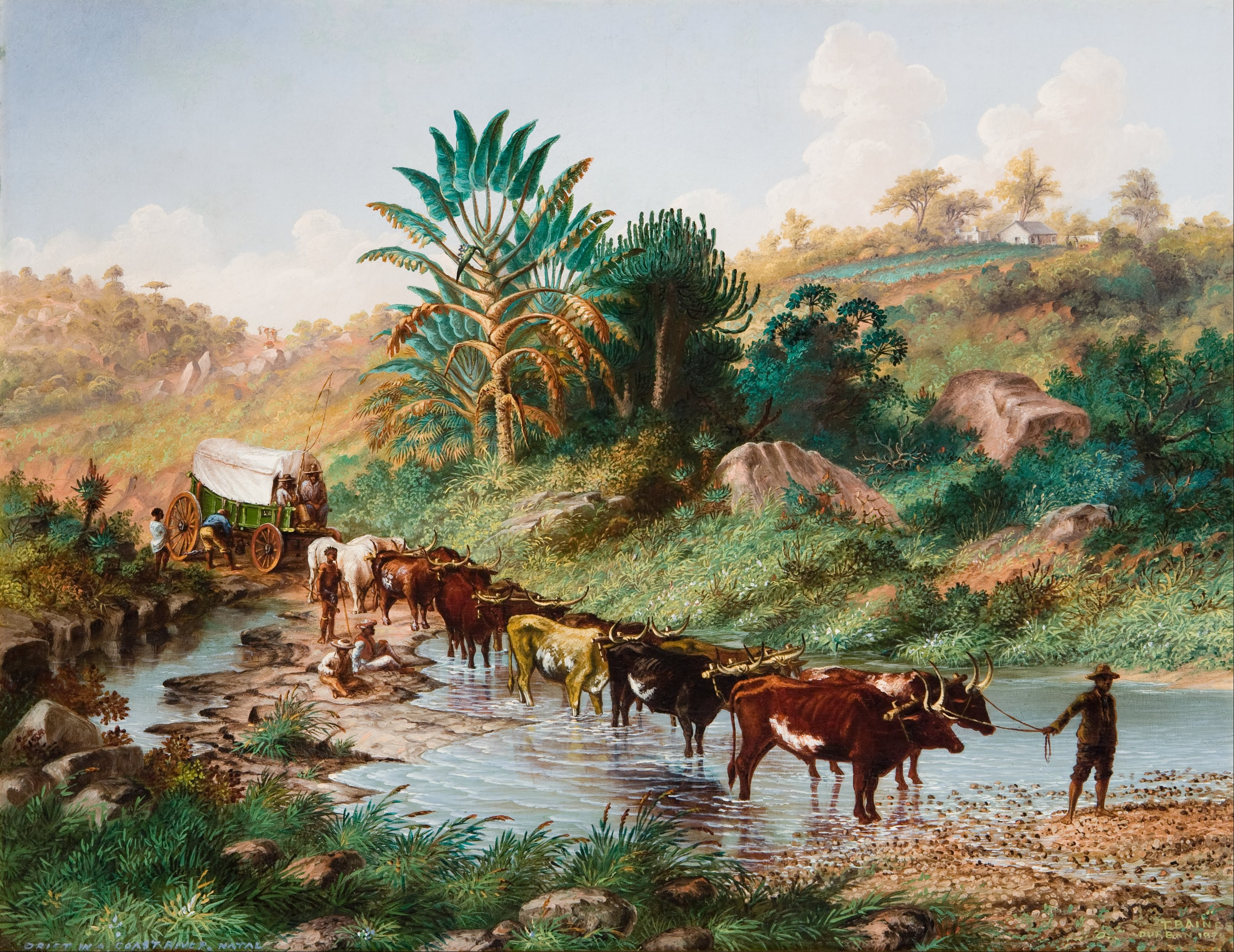
Thomas Baines

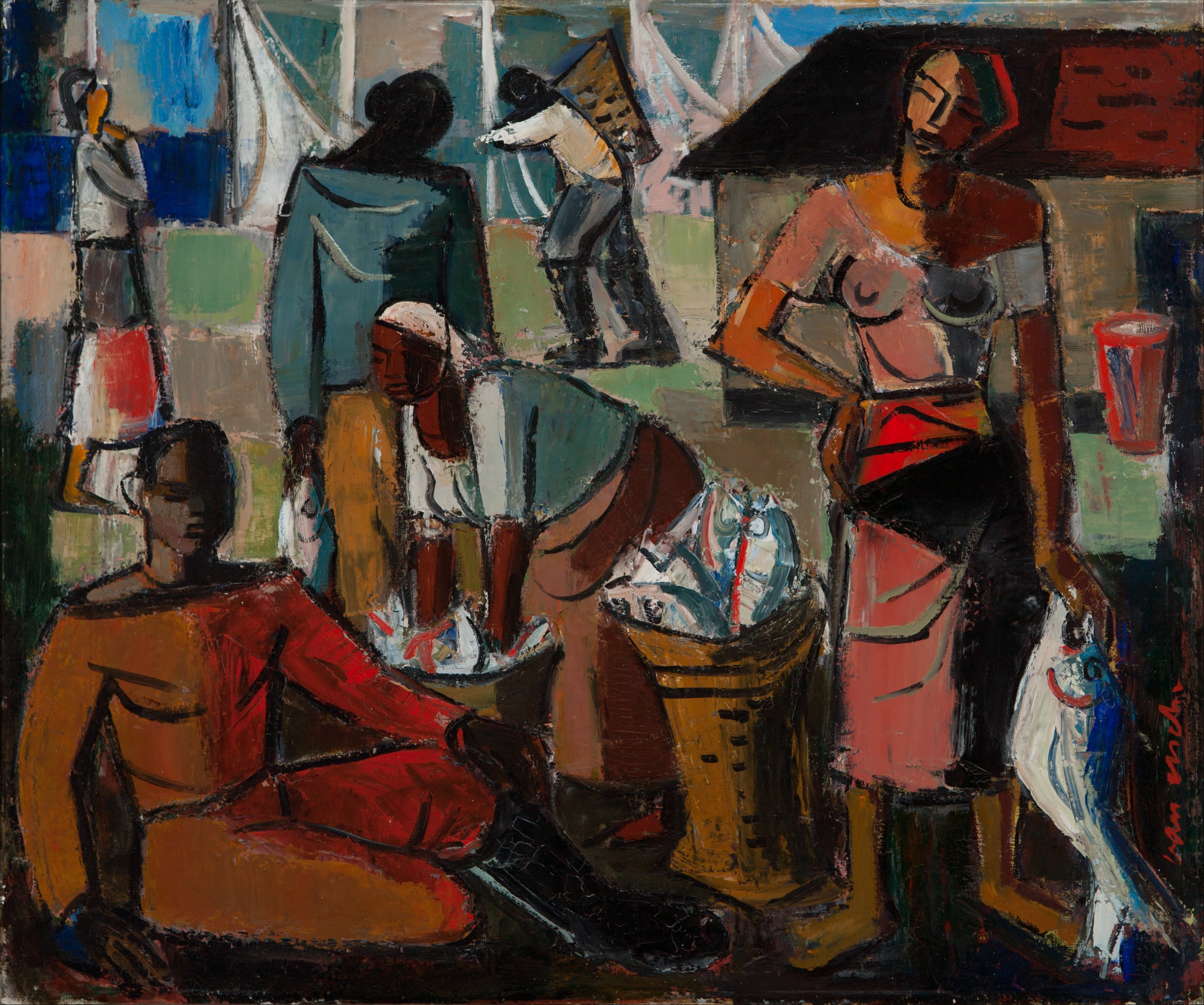
Wolf Kibel

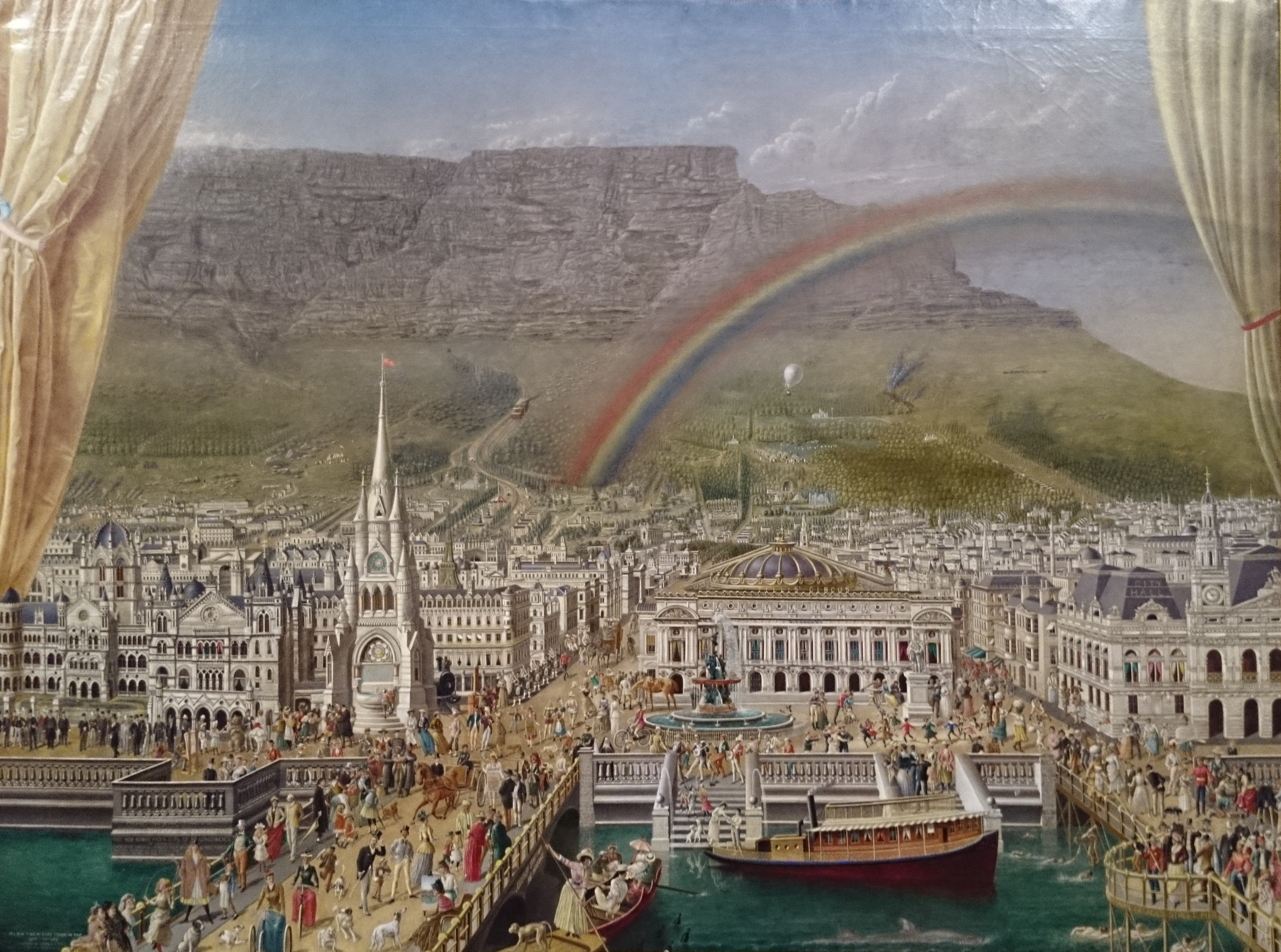
Holiday Time in Cape Town

== List of directors of the Iziko South African National Gallery ==
Name	Years in office
Prof. Charles du Ry	1973–1976
Dr. Raymond van Niekerk	1976–1989
Marilyn Martin	1990–2001 as Director of South African National Gallery
Marilyn Martin	2001–2008 as Director of Art Collections, Iziko Museums
Riason Naidoo	2009–2015

== Notable artworks ==
- Adderley Street Flower-sellers
- African Head
- Holiday Time in Cape Town in the Twentieth Century, in Honour of the Expected Arrival of a Governor-General of UNITED South Africa
- The Butcher Boys

== Permanent collection artists (non-exhaustive) ==
- Jane Alexander (The Butcher Boys)
- Willem Boshoff
- Alan Davie
- Marlene Dumas
- Robert Hodgins
- William Kentridge – The gallery contains Kentridge's series of five Soho Eckstein short animated films (1989–1996).
- Ronald Kitaj
- Moses Kottler
- Maggie Laubser
- Lippy Lipshitz
- Kagiso Patrick Mautloa
- Michael Porter
- Gerard Sekoto
- Penny Siopis
- Irma Stern
- Diane Victor

== See also ==
- List of national galleries
