= Holiday Time in Cape Town in the Twentieth Century, in Honour of the Expected Arrival of a Governor-General of UNITED South Africa =

Painting by James Ford

- Holiday Time in Cape Town in the Twentieth Century Holiday time in Cape Town
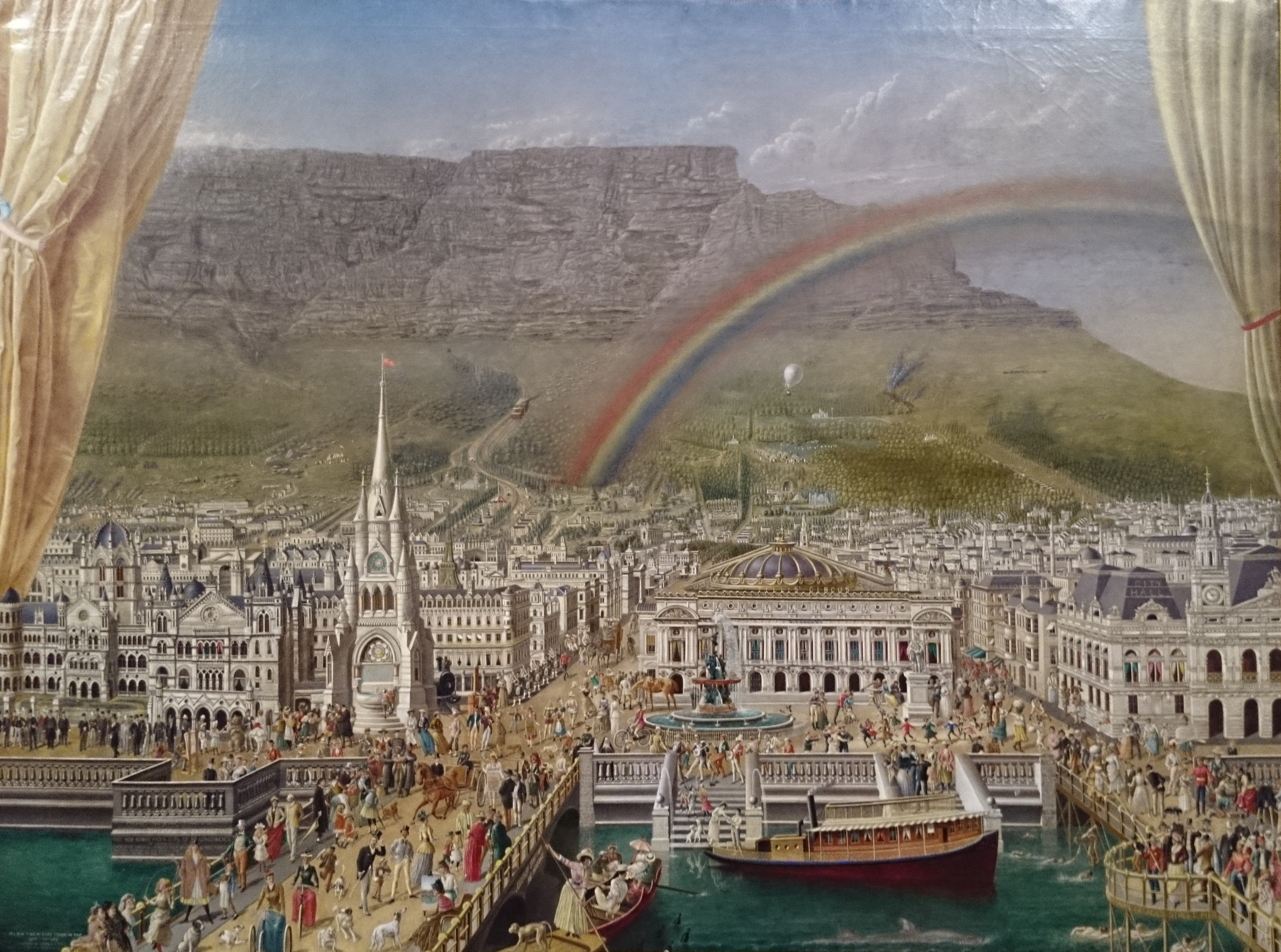
- Artist: James Ford
- Year: c. 1899
- Medium: Oil on canvas
- Subject: Cape Town welcoming the first Governor-General of a future imagined South Africa.
- Location: Iziko South African National Gallery; Cape Town

Holiday Time in Cape Town in the Twentieth Century, in Honour of the Expected Arrival of a Governor-General of UNITED South Africa, or more simply known as Holiday time in Cape Town or Holiday Time in Cape Town in the Twentieth Century, is a painting by British born Cape artist James Ford completed in 1899. The painting is housed at the Iziko South African National Gallery in Cape Town, South Africa.

== Description ==
The painting depicts an imagined, Victorian era, utopian future version of Cape Town welcoming the first Governor-General of a united South Africa. At the time South Africa as a nation state did not exist and instead consisted of two British colonies (the Cape Colony and Colony of Natal) and two independent Boer republics (the Orange Free State and Transvaal Republic). The painting combines imperial and progressive artistic elements whilst mixing both real and imaginary buildings and people. It advocates for the creation of a united federated South Africa over a decade before it became a reality.

Imagined buildings not present in Cape Town but depicted in the painting's foreground include the Paris Opera House, Scott Monument, and a number of Renaissance style buildings from Florence. Real Cape Town locations that are present in the painting includes Table Mountain, the Cape Town Pier, and the Molteno Dam. Imagined buildings depicted in the painting that do not exist elsewhere in the world are in the Second Empire style common in Paris, France and popular in Cape Town at the time.

List of some notable people depicted in the painting:

- Paul Kruger, then President of the Afrikaner Transvaal Republic and an opponent to the idea of a federated South Africa.
- Joseph Chamberlain, then British Secretary of State for the Colonies a proponent of a federated South Africa.
- Cecil Rhodes, Prime Minister of the Cape Colony and a proponent of a federated South Africa.
- Sir David Graaff, 1st Baronet, Cape business man and politician.
- James Ford, the artist, can be seen behind an easel left of the Scott Monument.

The imagined event depicted in the painting, the arrival of a Governor-General of a united South Africa, did occur in 1910 following the establishment of the Union of South Africa when Herbert Gladstone arrived in the newly formed country to take the position.

== History ==
Little is known of James Ford other than that he was born in Cornwall and came to Cape Town to teach at the Cape Town School of Art in 1880. He later lost his job at the school and spent the period from 1891 to 1899 painting Holiday Time in Cape Town.

Upon completion in 1899 the painting was displayed at the Standard Bank building where it was viewed by around 5000 people each paying one shilling. Ford hoped to sell the painting for £5,000 (roughly equivalent to £545,000 in 2020) but failed to find a buyer and later sold it for a reduced price. Ford died in a Cape Town poorhouse in 1908.
