= Penny Siopis =

South African artist from Cape Town (born 1953)

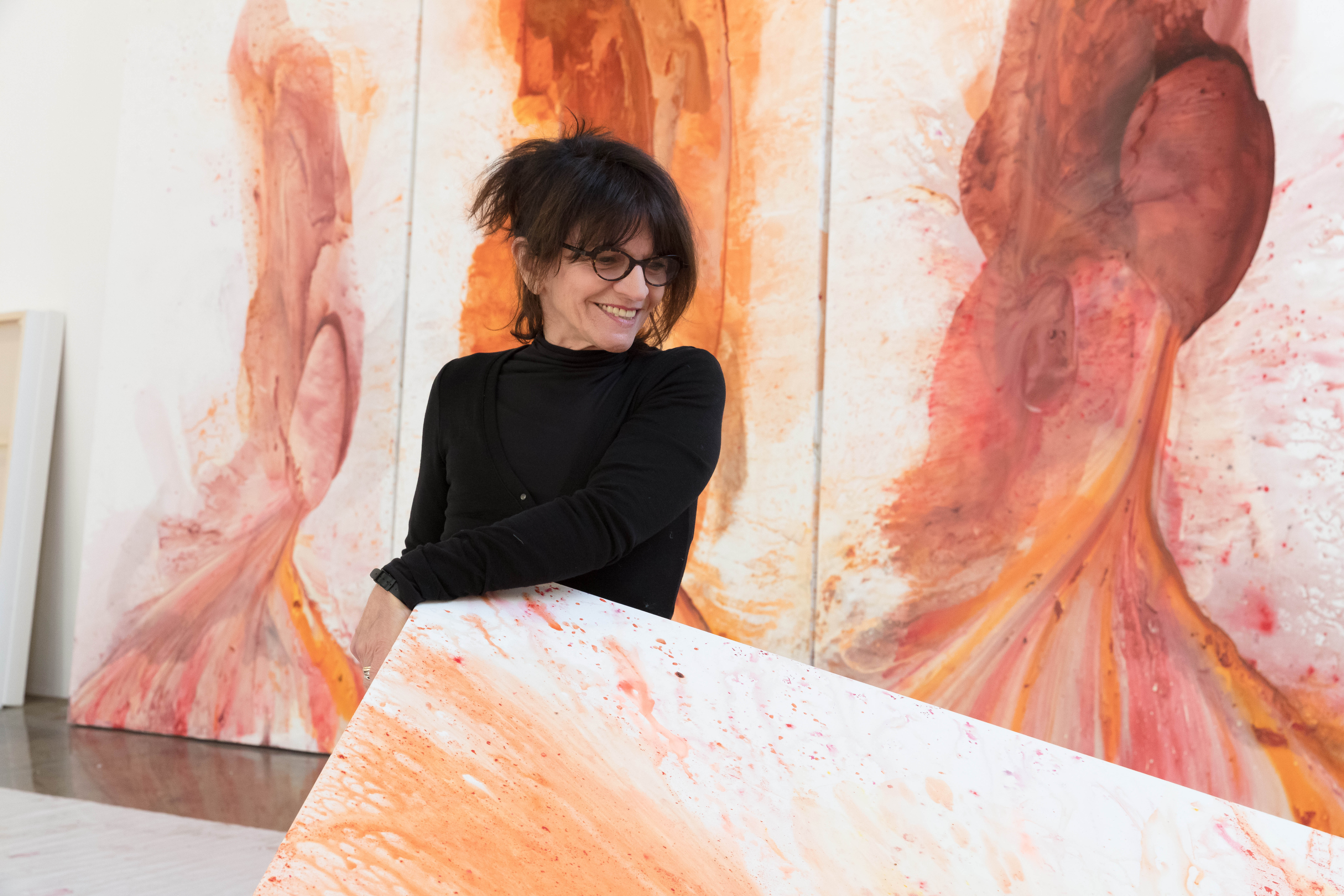
- Siopis with her large scale paintings at Maitland Institute, Cape Town
- Born: 5 February 1953 (age 73); Vryburg
- Education: Rhodes University

Penny Siopis (born 5 February 1953) is a South African artist from Cape Town. She was born in Vryburg in the North West province from Greek parents who had moved after inheriting a bakery from Siopis maternal grandfather. Siopis studied Fine Arts at Rhodes University in Makhanda, completing her master's degree in 1976, after which she pursued postgraduate studies at Portsmouth Polytechnic in the United Kingdom. She taught Fine Arts at the Technikon Natal in Durban from 1980 to 1983. In 1984 she took up a lectureship at the University of the Witwatersrand in Johannesburg. During this time she was also visiting research fellow at the University of Leeds (1992–93) and visiting professor in fine arts at Umeå University in Sweden (2000) as part of an interinstitutional exchange. With an honorary doctorate from Rhodes University, Makhanda – Siopis is currently honorary professor at Michaelis School of Fine Art, University of Cape Town.

== Early years ==
She came to prominence in the early 1980s with her 'cake' paintings, which materially encode feminist aesthetics in thick impasto oil paint surfaces. These works were followed by her 'history paintings', interpreted as a form of resistance against apartheid. Her interdisciplinary practice since the national liberation of her country has explored the persistence and fragility of memory, notions of truth and the complex entanglements of personal and collective histories. Experimenting with a wide range of materials and processes, she reflects on the politics of the body, grief and shame, estrangement, migration and more recently the relationship between the human and the not-human within the context of climate change. All her explorations assert materiality and process as inseparable from concept, with her characteristic use of contingent and chance-driven methods becoming emblematic of her interest in 'the poetics of vulnerability'. Griselda Pollock states, "Penny Siopis is one of the few artists in the world today who can weave a material web of marks, gestures, voices, words, found things and painted surfaces to entangle the brute forces of history with the delicate threads of human vulnerability".

== Work ==
Siopis has established herself as a prominent South African artist through her work across painting, installation, and film. Her practice frequently combines diverse references and materials in ways that challenge disciplinary boundaries and traditional binaries.6.6sFast

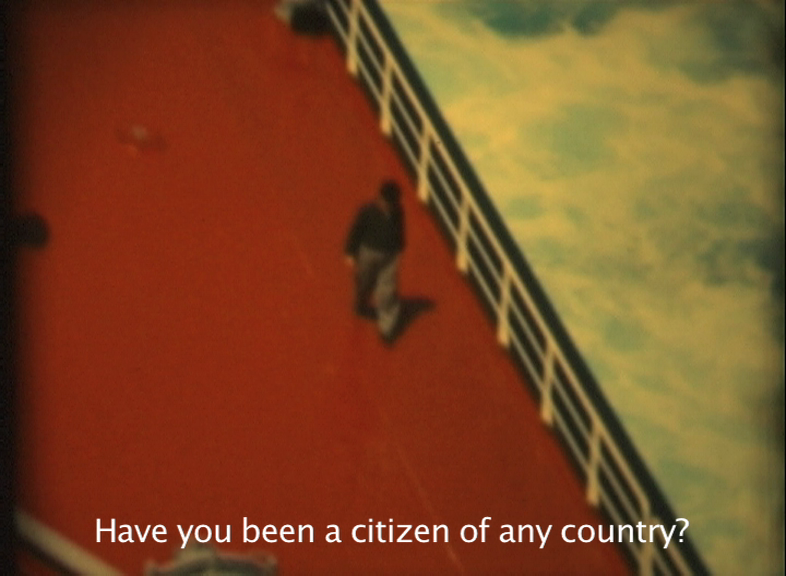
Obscure White Messenger, 2010, Film Still

Concepts of time run through all her work often manifesting in the actual physical changes of her materials; in her early cake paintings oil paint is made to be unnaturally affected by gravity, age and decay; in her films using archival footage time is marked as much by the effects of age on the celluloid as by the historical period caught in the sweep of the camera; in her accumulations of found objects in her installations, ideas of the heirloom come to the fore with her ongoing conceptual work Will (1997 – ) – in which she bequeaths objects to beneficiaries – being the ultimate time piece only becoming complete on her death; her glue and ink paintings index flux as they record the material transformation that happens when viscous glue matter reacts with pigment, gravity, the artist's bodily gestures, and the drying effects of the air.

Siopis sees her art practice as 'open form', operating as an intimate model in which the physical changes of her materials can be extrapolated into a larger ethics of personal and political transformation. According to Achille Mbembe, this quality marks her interest in process as a perpetual state of becoming and entails "the crafting of an unstable relation between form and formlessness, in the understanding that the process of becoming proceeds in ways that are almost always unpredictable and at times accidental"

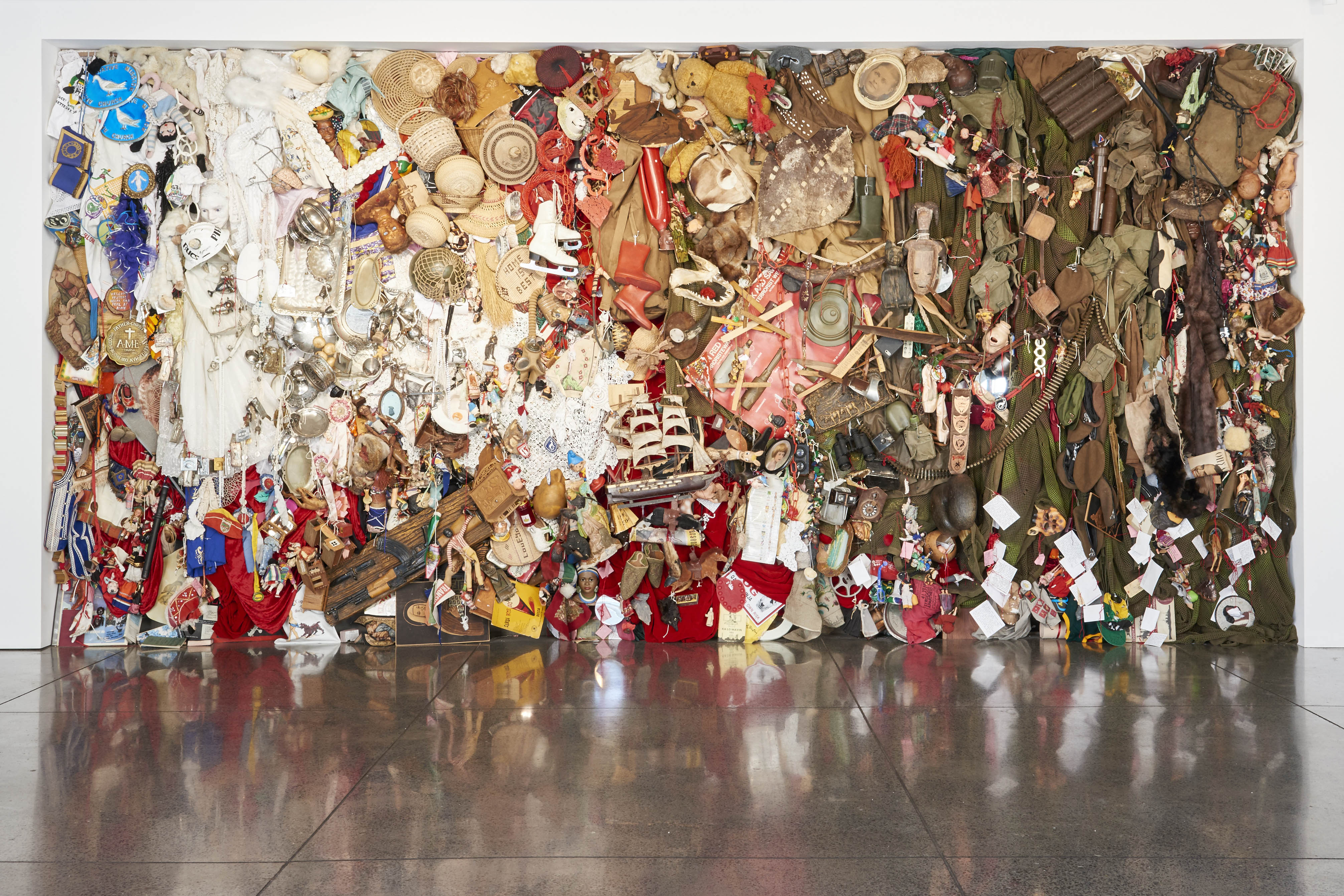
Charmed Lives installation by Penny Siopis, Wits Art Museum, 2015

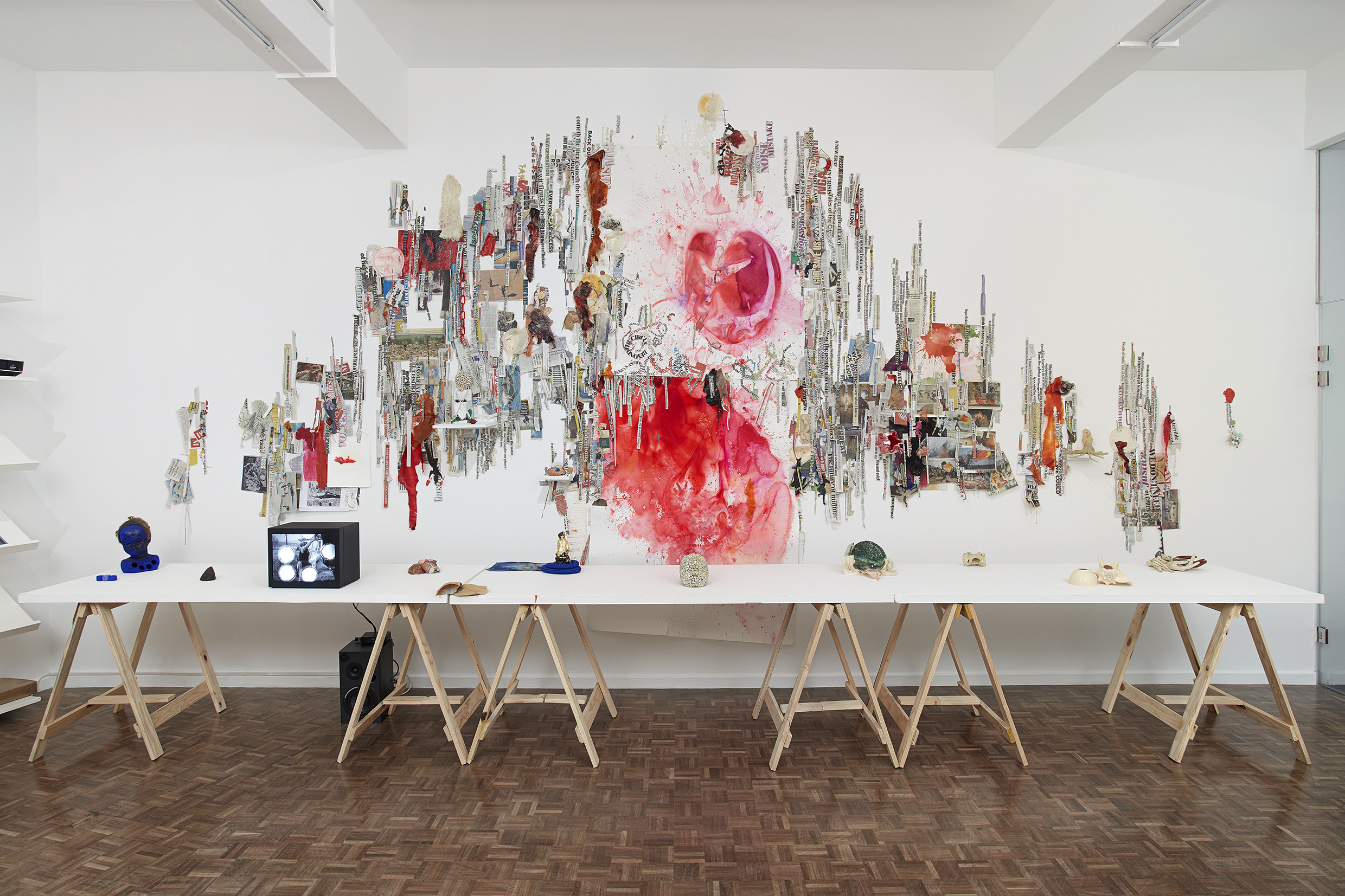
Tentacular Time, Stevenson Cape Town, 2019

=== Paintings ===
"From the outset, her attitude to painting has been simultaneously modernist and counter-modernist in its complex irreverence to the purity of both creative act and the physical medium."

==== Cake paintings ====
Between 1980 and 1984 Siopis developed her 'cake' paintings. Using unconventional implements such as piping nozzles and other cake decorating tools to make her high relief impasto paintings Siopis explored the materiality of oil paint, its potential as object and its association with traditional representations of the female body. The excessive impasto surface changes over time with the outside layer of drying long before the interior, leading the surface to wrinkle and crack. This becomes a metaphor for the all too real effects of time and circumstance on the body. Siopis challenges western conventions of the idealisation of female flesh and beauty. While the female body is the main focus of these works, their association with food and decay comments on larger social narratives of decay which are developed in the paintings that follow. Working with lived experiences alongside feminist theories Siopis expresses how she "was interested in working within the space of complexity and as I worked the materiality became the critical thing"

==== History paintings ====
Between 1985 and 1995 Penny Siopis produced a body of work often referred to as her 'history paintings'. Although her interest in the materiality of paint and her experimentation with this medium never ceased, the works from this period differed in many important ways from the 'cake' paintings. The transition was already marked in her Still Life with Watermelon and Other Things (1985); it was even more clearly evident in Melancholia (1986). Presenting a vision of colonialism in decline, the scene in Melancholia is both a vanitas and a history painting. It combines symbols of European high culture and references to Africa, all of them piling up as the debris of history within a claustrophobic space that signifies excess, ruin and psychological malaise. In the past the genre of history painting was seen as the highest achievement of the European art historical tradition. Siopis' ironic interrogation of its form and ideology is evident in such works as Patience on a Monument: 'A History Painting' (1988).

In the history works she introduced the techniques of collage and assemblage as a means to disrupt direct depiction and to bring in references to the representations of colonial history that South Africans were brought up on through history books. These techniques also allowed her to mark the significance of objects as traces of history in their own right. Through the introduction of objects and found images her works challenged the invisible but powerful structures within the ideological systems of apartheid at a time when political tensions in the country were running high.

Paintings with reference to historical events

==== Pinky Pinky ====
The 2001–2004 series is the visualization of a South African urban legend Pinky Pinky. A hybrid creature of amalgamated forms. Half-human, half-animal, bi-gendered creature of indeterminate race, Pinky Pinky preys on school children in toilets and threatens girls in pink underwear. Siopis embarked on a personal exploration of Pinky Pinky, and according to verbal accounts by schoolchildren she interviewed on the topic, produced visual embodiments of this processual hybrid figure of no stable identity. Furthering a practice in manipulating paint and form to simulate skin and flesh, Siopis allows the paint to stand in as object of unspeakability. Located within Freudian theory and Lacan's 'real', Siopis explores humans' ability to work-through personal feelings that exceed language by projecting things you cannot do in real life, onto and within fiction, myth and fantasy.

In her visualisation of Pinky Pinky, Siopis inserted various human prosthetics into the pink, fleshy paint – plastic body parts like eyes and fake eye lashes; teeth and finger nails. In these 'fake horrors', Siopis allows viewers to feel both connected to and distanced from their own fears. In a 2004 interview with Sipho Mdanda, Siopis writes how "Many of these prosthetics are "traditionally" flesh colour, a kind of dirty pink. There is irony here, as flesh colour is not just a category of colour, but nothing less than a western conceit in which whiteness (pink) becomes the universal colour for flesh". The series investigates personal and public narratives around fear and trauma in South Africa. It is an allegory of the nation's deepest fears around issues of poverty, xenophobia, race, and crime at a time of radical social transition and uncertainty post-1994.

Siopis states : "As much as Pinky Pinky is a perpetrator of violence, it also seems a victim of, and scapegoat for, violent, uncivil actions – a constructed 'something' to blame for social problems."

==== Shame paintings ====
Siopis produced the Shame paintings between 2002 and 2005 in the wake of South Africa's Truth and Reconciliation Commission whilst exploring the public and psychological state of shame. The series of mixed-media paintings, show the artist's manipulation of thick, lacquer gel paint, used in home-craft to create stained glass and coloured mirror effects on surfaces. The ready-made rubber stamped messages within the paintings show the role of a language and the 'unspeakable' nature of the feeling imbued within the painting process.

Works from the series were first shown in 2003 at solo exhibitions in Johannesburg and Athens. In 2005 the Shame paintings became a key feature of Siopis' multi-media installation titled Three Essays on Shame at the museum of Sigmund Freud, once his house, in London[8.33]. Responding to Freud's publication Three Essays on the Theory of Sexuality, of which the 2005 project marked the centenary, Siopis' Shame installation "linked the issues of sexuality and shame to the traumatic history of her country". By inserting references (voice recordings and objects) into the space, the work evoked a dialogue between Freud's ideas and various individual experiences during the proceedings of the South African Truth and Reconciliation Commission, binding the traces of human vulnerability and the dramatic effects of sweeping historical narratives. Consisting of three parts located in Freud's study, dining room and bedroom, the rooms were transformed to exhibit Siopis' installations titled Voice, Gesture and Memory – a frieze of the small paintings installed around Freud's deathbed.

As part of Red: Iconography of Colour in the Work of Penny Siopis in 2009, 90 paintings from the series were exhibited at the KZNSA Gallery in Durban. The Shame paintings were later included in Siopis' 2014 retrospective exhibition Time and Again, installing the paintings as a grid at the South African National Gallery in Cape Town, and Wits Art Museum in Johannesburg. During a recent online exhibition for Art Basel: Pioneers, an installation of the Shame paintings was exhibited at Stevenson, Cape Town in 2021 alongside her most recent film titled Shadow Shame Again, showing a relation to gendered violence in South Africa and around the globe alongside here years of work on the subject of shame. Of this most recent exhibition, Pumla Dineo-Gqola writes how "The footage, music and clapping in the film, like the careful paintings arranged as a frieze, create meaning together, about violence's production of shame, and about its raced, gendered and historically contingent meanings".

==== Ink and glue paintings ====
For the last 15 years, Penny Siopis has been extending her interests in materiality, chance and contingency alongside form and formlessness. She experimented with the unorthodox medium of wood, glue, and ink. She shows matter to be alive, creating a fluid process in which the medium is an active agent in the making of the work.

This process involves the mix of ink and glue and sometimes water through pouring the glue onto the canvas which is then moved to direct the flow. Allowing the materials to "mix, swirl and settle into patterns and shapes; the artist responds to the unpredictable image that starts to take shape "encouraging" their development, and sometimes choosing not to intervene at all." Siopis writes of wood glue's 'manifest agency' – a substance of change – white, viscous and liquid, transforming into hard, transparent surface. A medium of the non-human with the ability to alter its state and colour according the forces around it, Siopis explores the 'life' of an inert medium.

"I believe that encounters with lively matter can chasten my fantasies of human mastery, highlight the common materiality of all that is, expose a wider distribution of agency and reshape the self and its interests"

The formless matter that the surface presents offers humans a broader scope for imaginative association. Viewers are invited to exercise their own agency in inventing an image from the material residues on the surface. In this process a personal transformation might be enabled, and the glue and ink process becomes a material way of thinking about larger social transformation [material acts]. Mbembe writes, "Matter enables life. It also complicates life. It opens up to the deep sense of the human as one among many species"'.

After her 2009 solo show 'Paintings' at Stevenson Gallery, Siopis developed the medium further in conjunction with found objects – seen in her 2017 solo show titled Restless Republic. In the same year the artist worked in residence at the Maitland Institute on a project titled Open Form/Open Studio where she continued her exploration with glue and ink on large-scale canvases and invited members of the public into the space to engage with her process. For her solo show Warm Water Imaginaries in 2019, Siopis incorporated the medium with oil paint in an installation of 90 small paintings on paper alongside a room of object-assemblages titled Tentacular Time and the makings of her film She Breathes Water. Siopis used various modes of making to respond to the vast history of climate change and the complex geological and social present. The complete film was more recently exhibited alongside her Atlas series of glue, ink and oil paintings on paper in Siopis' 2021 solo show In the Air at Stevenson, Amsterdam which further explored themes of the climate and the Covid-19 pandemic.

=== Installation ===
Penny Siopis's installation works consists of accumulations of objects drawn from the artists personal collection installed in various iterations. "I was always interested in objects as carriers of meanings beyond themselves", Siopis writes, "they are physical traces of time, of people's lives and social histories". The objects migrate from one installation to another, "like an archive, which I use similarly to how I use film...its an ephemeral art really.The objects get taken down and become like paint tubes again".

Charmed Lives, an installation project created for the Liberated Voices exhibition at New York's Museum for African Art in 1999 is notable amongst Siopis's works in this genre, becoming a prototype for further installations. The vast number of objects in this installation are imbued with emotions that the artist and the viewers bestow on them revealing different layers in the palimpsest of memories from personal, social and art historical, asking probing questions about the nature of the archive and the relative truth of a historical record. The constant evolution of the installations and the meanings made from them functions as a generative force in Siopis's work. "One thing nestled next to another or dropped over another, creating countless relationships. They're endless these bits of relationships between things and objects and spaces" writes Siopis.

Will (1997 – ) is an installation that encompasses the objects that the artist has singled out from her vast collection and bequeathed to individuals all around the world. An autobiographical project, this particular collection also functions as an archive and inventory of both personal and collective history. "The corpus will dissolve and the fragments disperse. They will be shot into a new world...The giving itself reflects a dynamic of human relating that in my mind becomes part of the installation".

Jennifer Law writes on this installation and how it seeks to "establish and maintain relationships across generational time and space". As both art and heirloom, Law writes "Sopis's Will is the ultimate time piece...We are able to glance back on a life-in-formation and recognize the subject as discursively produced, 'as project, something to be built''.

=== Video/Film ===
Siopis began working with film in 1994 with her film Per Kind Permission: Fieldwork. However, in 1997 Siopis found her niche in film making through the work My Lovely Day. She has continued to work with film throughout her career and describes the videos as montages, cut-and-paste images that move and unfold over time. Combined with text and music, film offers a wonderful opportunity for narrative.

In My Lovely Day Siopis cuts sequences from her mom's 8mm home movies that she took of their family life in the 50s and 60s, and the more public events that were caught in the sweep of her camera. She combined these with music and the remembered words of her grandmother, presented as subtitles. She wove the story of three generations of women, as a kind of transgenerational haunting. The story compresses historical time into one day. The historical moment of her telling is apartheid South Africa, but her references to social turmoil and catastrophe are to earlier times: the 'exchange of populations' following the Greco-Turkish conflict of 1919–1922, the massive migrations sparked by the two World Wars and the beginnings of the decolonisation of Africa.

Her mother's home movies led Siopis to the home movies of strangers, which she finds in flea markets and thrift shops in South Africa and on her travels abroad. She now has a huge archive of found film that she mines continually. Siopis sees the film as a ready-made in that it brings its own history and context into the scene. She cuts sequences from the film which she connects to the text in mostly allusive ways. So, whoever views it will shape their narrative too.

All the videos take a very particular story from South African history that has an elemental quality and speaks beyond its historical circumstances; two of them, Obscure White Messenger (2010) and The Master is Drowning (2012), look at the actual and attempted assassinations of apartheid Prime Minister H.F. Verwoerd. Siopis draws on various archival sources to construct the narrative, and use different modes of address, but she prefers the first person. In Obscure White Messenger she uses a question and answer format, which she drew from the psychiatrist's report of the interview he had with Dimitrio Tsafendas, immediately after the murder. In the beginning of the film it is not easy to work out who is talking: who's the 'you' and who's the 'I'?.

== Solo exhibitions ==
- 2025 National Museum of Contemporary Art, Athens
- 2021 Art Basel, Pioneers
- 2020 Stevenson, Amsterdam
- 2019 National Gallery of Zimbabwe in Bulawayo, Zimbabwe
- 2018 Zeitz Museum of Contemporary Art Africa, Cape Town, South Africa
- 2017 Stevenson, Cape Town, South Africa
- 2016 Erg Gallery, Brussels, Belgium
- 2015 Stevenson, Cape Town, South Africa
- 2015 Wits Art Museum, Johannesburg, South Africa
- 2014 Brandts Museum, Odense, Denmark
- 2014 Iziko South African National Gallery, Cape Town, South Africa
- 2011 Stevenson, Cape Town, South Africa
- 2010 Brodie/Stevenson, Johannesburg, South Africa
- 2009 KZNSA Gallery, Durban, South Africa
- 2009 Michael Stevenson, Cape Town, South Africa
- 2007 Michael Stevenson, Cape Town, South Africa
- 2005 Goodman Gallery, Johannesburg, South Africa
- 2005 Freud Museum, London, UK
- 2003 University of Witwatersrand, Johannesburg, South Africa
- 2003 Kappatos Gallery, Athens, Greece
- 2002 Gertrude Posel Gallery, University of the Witwatersrand, Johannesburg, South Africa
- 2002 Tropen Museum, Amsterdam, the Netherlands
- 2002 Goodman Gallery, Johannesburg, South Africa
- 2000 Standard Bank National Arts Festival, Makhanda, South Africa
- 2000 Gasworks Artists' Studios, London, UK
- 1998 Goodman Gallery, Johannesburg, South Africa
- 1994 Standard Bank Gallery, Johannesburg, South Africa
- 1990 Goodman Gallery, Johannesburg, South Africa
- 1990 Standard Bank National Arts Festival, Makhanda, South Africa
- 1990 Iziko South African National Gallery, Cape Town, South Africa
- 1987 Goodman Gallery, Johannesburg, South Africa
- 1983 Market Theatre Gallery, Johannesburg, South Africa
- 1982 NSA Gallery, Durban, South Africa
- 1980 Hiscock Gallery, Portsmouth, England
- 1979 British Council Centre, London, UK
- 1978 Hellenic Centre, Port Elizabeth, South Africa
- 1978 South Africa Collector's Gallery, Johannesburg, South Africa

== Selected group exhibitions ==
- 2019 Nicodim Gallery, Bucharest, Romania; Los Angeles, California
- 2018 Stevenson, Cape Town, South Africa
- 2018 Oaxaca, Mexico
- 2018 Stevenson, Johannesburg, South Africa
- 2018 Pérez Art Museum Miami, USA
- 2018 The Glasgow School of Art, Scotland
- 2017 Prospect.4 Biennial, New Orleans, USA
- 2017 Stevenson, Cape Town, South Africa
- 2016 10th Taipei Biennial, Taipei Fine Arts Museum, Taiwan
- 2016 British Museum, London, UK
- 2016 ICA Indian Ocean, Port Louis, Mauritius
- 2016 Standard Bank Gallery, Johannesburg, South Africa
- 2016 Stevenson Cape Town and Johannesburg, South Africa
- 2016 Iziko South African National Gallery, Cape Town, South Africa
- 2015 The Walther Collection, La Maison Rouge, Paris, France
- 2015 Kunsthaus Dresden, Germany
- 2015 Tate Modern, London, UK
- 2015 Kunsthaus Dresden, Germany
- 2015 Galerie Les Filles De Calvaire, Paris, France
- 2015 Beirut Art Centre, Lebanon
- 2014 New Church Museum, Cape Town, South Africa
- 2014 Stevenson, Cape Town, South Africa
- 2014 Marian Goodman Gallery, Paris, France
- 2014 Yerba Buena Center for the Arts, San Francisco, USA
- 2014 Wits Art Museum, Johannesburg, South Africa
- 2013 Former Tagesspiegel Building, Berlin, Germany;
- 2013 Michaelis Gallery, University of Cape Town, South Africa
- 2013 South African Pavilion, 55th Venice Biennale, Italy
- 2013 Jeu de Paume, Paris, France
- 2013 Michaelis Gallery, University of Cape Town, South Africa
- 2012 Stevenson, Cape Town, South Africa
- 2012 Michaelis Galleries, University of Cape Town, South Africa
- 2012 Museum of Contemporary Art, Oslo, Norway
- 2012 Khiasma, Les Lilas, Paris, France
- 2012 Dubai Community Theatre and Arts Centre;
- 2012 University of Johannesburg Art Gallery, South Africa
- 2012 The New Church, Cape Town, South Africa
- 2011 Stevenson, Cape Town, South Africa
- 2011 Iziko South African National Gallery, Cape Town
- 2011 École nationale supérieure des Beaux-arts, Paris, France
- 2011 Standard Bank Gallery, Johannesburg, South Africa
- 2011 Walther Collection, Neu-Ulm/Burlafingen, Germany
- 2011 FADA Gallery, University of Johannesburg, South Africa
- 2011 Iwalewa-Haus, University of Bayreuth, Germany
- 2010 Tennis Palace Art Museum, Helsinki, Finland
- 2010 Michael Stevenson, Cape Town, South Africa
- 2010 7th Biennale of Sydney, Australia
- 2010 Savannah College of Art and Design, Gutstein Gallery Savannah, Georgia, USA
- 2010 Goodman Gallery, Johannesburg, South Africa
- 2009 Brodie/Stevenson, Johannesburg, South Africa
- 2009 San Francisco Camerawork, San Francisco, USA
- 2009 Den Hvide Kodby, Copenhagen, Denmark
- 2008 Michael Stevenson Gallery, Cape Town, South Africa
- 2008 Fowler Museum, Los Angeles, USA
- 2008 Hood Museum, New Hampshire
- 2008 Davis Museum, Wellesley, Massachusetts; San Diego
- 2008 Museum of Art, San Diego, USA
- 2008 3rd Guangzhou Triennial, China
- 2007 L'oeil en cascade, Paris, France
- 2007 Centre de Cultura Contemporania de Barcelona, Spain
- 2007 Michael Stevenson Gallery, Cape Town, South Africa
- 2007 Tate Gallery, Liverpool, England
- 2007 Goodman Gallery, Cape Town, South Africa
- 2007 Cape '07, International Biennale, Cape Town, South Africa
- 2007 Art Extra, Johannesburg, South Africa
- 2007 Goodman Gallery, Cape Town, South Africa
- 2006 Standard Bank Gallery, Johannesburg, South Africa
- 2006 Iziko South African National Gallery, Cape Town, South Africa
- 2006 Belfast, Northern Ireland
- 2006 Johannesburg Art Gallery, South Africa
- 2005 Royal College of Art, London, UK
- 2005 Print Center of New York, USA
- 2005 FLAC, Centrum voor Kunsten en Kultuur in Gent, Belgium
- 2005 Basis Gallery, Frankfurt, Germany
- 2004 Museum Bochum, Bochum, Germany
- 2004 Feria Internacional de Arte Contemporáneo, Arco, Madrid, Spain
- 2004 International Art Fair, Athens, Greece
- 2004 Fortis Circustheater, Amsterdam, the Netherlands
- 2004 MCH Messe, Basel, Switzerland
- 2004 Kunsthaus, Basel, Switzerland
- 2004 Michael Stevenson Gallery, Cape Town, South Africa
- 2004 MTN Gallery, Johannesburg, South Africa
- 2004 Klein Karoo Nationale Kunstefees, Oudtshoorn, South Africa
- 2003 Tropen Museum, Amsterdam, the Netherlands
- 2003 Arti et Amiciitiae, Amsterdam, the Netherlands
- 2003 Michael Stevenson, Cape Town, South Africa
- 2002 Davis Museum and Cultural Centre, Massachusetts; San Diego
- 2002 Wellesley College, Boston, USA
- 2001 Centre de Cultura Contemporania de Arte, Barcelona, Spain
- 2001 Gertrude Posel Gallery, Johannesburg, South Africa
- 2000 Castle of Good Hope, Cape Town; Gertrude Posel Gallery, Johannesburg, South Africa
- 2000 XIII International AIDS conference, Durban, South Africa
- 2000 Harvard AIDS Institute, Boston, USA
- 1999 Villa Medici, Rome, Italy
- 1999 Museum for African Art, New York; Austin
- 1999 Museum of Art, Texas; Cantor Arts Center, Stanford University
- 1999 Palo Alto, California
- 1999 University of Arizona Gallery, Tucson, USA
- 1999 Gertrude Posel gallery, University of the Witwatersrand, Johannesburg, South Africa
- 1999 South African National Gallery, Cape Town; Bamako Festival of Photography, Mali
- 1998 Fotofest, Houston, USA
- 1998 Standard Bank National Arts Festival, Makhanda
- 1998 Castle of Good Hope, Cape Town; Standard Bank Gallery, Johannesburg, South Africa
- 1998 BildMuseet, Umea, Sweden
- 1998 Grande Palais, Paris, France
- 1998 Castle of Good Hope, Cape Town, South Africa
- 1998 University of the Witwatersrand, Johannesburg, South Africa
- 1997 The National Touring Exhibitions, Oslo, Norway
- 1997 6th Havana International Biennial, Havana, Cuba
- 1997 2nd Johannesburg International Biennale, Johannesburg, South Africa
- 1997 Goodman Gallery, Johannesburg, South Africa
- 1996 Gertrude Posel Gallery, Johannesburg, South Africa
- 1996 Arnolfini, Bristol, UK
- 1996 Adelson Galleries, New York, USA
- 1996 The Castle of Good Hope, Cape Town, South Africa
- 1996 Culturgest, Lisbon, Portugal
- 1995 1st Johannesburg International Biennale
- 1995 Wits Galleries, Africus – 1st Johannesburg International Biennale
- 1995 Johannesburg Art Gallery, South Africa
- 1995 South African National Gallery, Cape Town, South Africa
- 1995 Standard Bank National Arts Festival, Makhanda, South Africa
- 1995 Meridian Center, Washington DC, USA
- 1995 City Museum and Art Galleries, Birmingham, UK
- 1995 Bernard Jacobson Gallery, London, UK
- 1995 Center for the Arts, San Francisco
- 1995 1st Gwanju Biennale, South Korea
- 1995 Delfina Studio Trust, London, UK
- 1995 National Arts Festival, Makhanda, South Africa
- 1995 Meridian Center, Washington DC, USA
- 1994 5th Havana International Biennale, Cuba
- 1994 Art First Gallery, London, UK
- 1994 Block Gallery, Evanston, USA
- 1993 XLV Venice Biennale, Palazzo
- 1994 Stedelijk Museum, Amsterdam, the Netherlands
- 1994 Giustinian Lolin, Fondazione Levi, Venice, Italy
- 1994 Sala 1 Gallery, Rome, Italy
- 1994 Leeds City Art Gallery, Leeds, England
- 1992 Cité Internationale des Arts, Paris, France
- 1992 Alliance Française Gallery, Durban, South Africa
- 1991 Cape Town Triennial, Iziko South African National Gallery
- 1991 Standard Bank National Arts Festival, Albany Museum, Makhanda
- 1991 Standard Bank Gallery, Johannesburg, South Africa
- 1991 Newtown Gallery, Johannesburg, South Africa
- 1990 Museum of Modern Art, Oxford, UK
- 1990 SOHO 20 Gallery, New York, USA
- 1989 The Portsmouth Collection, Aspex Gallery, Portsmouth, UK
- 1988 Market Gallery, Johannesburg, South Africa
- 1988 Johannesburg Art Gallery, South Africa
- 1988 Cape Town Triennial, Iziko South African National Gallery
- 1987 Oosterkerk, Amsterdam, the Netherlands
- 1986 Volkskas Atelier Award Exhibition, South African Association of Arts, Pretoria
- 1985 Africana Museum, Johannesburg, South Africa
- 1985 South African National Gallery, Cape Town
- 1985 Durban Art Museum, South Africa
- 1985 Cape Town Triennial, South African National Gallery, Cape Town
- 1984 South African Association of Arts, Pretoria
- 1983 University of the Witwatersrand, Johannesburg
- 1983 University of Natal, Pietermaritzburg
- 1982 Cape Town Triennial, South African National Gallery, Cape Town
- 1977 Settler’s Museum, Makhanda, South Africa

== Collections ==
The artist's work is represented in major public collections in South Africa; international collections include the Centre Pompidou, Paris; the Smithsonian Institution, Washington; Moderna Museet, Stockholm; and Tate, London.

== Awards ==
- 2016 Arts & Culture Trust Lifetime Achievement Award, South Africa
- 2015 Helgaard Steyn Prize, South Africa
- 2002 Klein Karoo Nationale Kunsfees: Best Visual Artist Award, South Africa
- 1995 Vita Art Now, Quarterly Award Winner, South Africa
- 1991 Vita Art Now, Special Merit Award, South Africa
- 1988 Vita Art Now, Quarterly Award Winner, South Africa
- Vita Art Now, Merit Award, South Africa
- 1986 Volkskas Atelier Award, South Africa
- 1985 Cape Town Triennial, Merit Award, South Africa

== Bibliography ==
- Sue Williamson, Resistance Art in South Africa. Cape Town: David Philip, 1989.
- Colin Richards, 'For want of (An)Other World', in Penny Siopis, Johannesburg: The Artists Press, 1994.
- Clive van den Berg (ed) Panoramas of Passage: Changing Landscapes of South Africa, Washington and Johannesburg: Meridian Center and Wits Art Galleries, 1995.
- Okwui Enwezor (ed) Trade Routes: History and Geography, Greater Johannesburg Metropolitan Council, 1997.
- Frank Herremen & Mark D'Amato, Liberated Voices: Contemporary Art from South Africa, London and New York: Museum for African Art: Prestel, 1999.
- Jennifer A Law, 'The Story Teller: Penny Siopis', in Liberated Voices: Contemporary Art from South Africa Frank Herreman (ed), New York: Museum of African Art, New York and Prestel, 1999.
- Brenda Atkinson and Candice Breitz (eds) Grey Areas: Representation, Identity and Politics in Contemporary South African Art, Johannesburg: Chalkham Hill Press, 1999.
- Olu Oguibe and Okwui Enwezor, (eds) Reading the Contemporary: African Art from Theory to the Marketplace, London: Iniva and MIT Press, 2000.
- Jennifer Law, Penny Siopis: Sympathetic Magic. Johannesburg: University of Witswaterstrand, 2002.
- Kathryn Smith (ed) Penny Siopis, Johannesburg: Goodman Gallery, 2005.
- Colin Richards, 'Prima Facie: Surface as Depth in the Work of Penny Siopis' in Kathryn Smith (ed) Penny Siopis, Johannesburg: Goodman Gallery, 2005.
- Griselda Pollock, 'Painting, Difference and Desire in History: The Work of Penny Siopis 1985–1994' in Kathryn Smith (ed) Penny Siopis, Johannesburg: Goodman Gallery, 2005.
- Jennifer Law, Three Essays on Shame, London: Freud Museum, 2005.
- Penny Siopis, 'Shame in Three Parts at the Freud Museum' in Claire Pajaczkowska and Ivan Ward (eds), Shame and Sexuality: Psychoanalysis and Visual Culture, London: Routledge, 2008.
- Sarah Nuttall, Entanglement: Literary and Cultural Reflections on Post- Apartheid, Johannesburg: Wits University Press, 2009.
- Brenton Maart (ed), Red, The Iconography of Colour in the work of Penny Siopis, Durban: KZNSA Gallery, 2009.
- Sarah Nuttall & Penny Siopis, An Unrecoverable Strangeness: some reflections on selfhood and otherness in South African Art, Critical Arts 24:3, 2010.
- Colin Richards, 'In Human History: Pasts and Prospects in South African Art today' in Thembinkosi Goniwe, Mario Pisarra (eds), Visual Century: South African Art in Context 1907–2007, Vo 4, Johannesburg: Wits University Press, 2011.
- Sue Williamson, South African Art Now. New York: HarperCollins, 2011.
- Penny Siopis and Kim Miller, Whose Afraid of the Crowd, Catalogue 57. Cape Town: Stevenson, 2011.
- Corinne Diserens, Appropriated Landscapes: Contemporary African Photography from The Walther Collection, Göttingen: Steidl, 2011.
- Penny Siopis, 'The Hooks of History – Three Films' in Marie-Hélène Gutberelet, Cara Snyman (eds) Shoe Shop, Johannesburg: Jacana Media, 2012.
- Brenton Maart (ed), Contemporary South African Art and the Archive, Makhanda: National Arts Festival, 2013.
- Gerrit Oliver (ed), Penny Siopis: Time and Again, Wits University Press: Johannesburg, 2014.
- Griselda Pollock, 'Remembering Three Essays on Shame, Penny Siopis, Freud Museum, London 2005' in Gerrit Oliver (ed), Penny Siopis: Time and Again, Wits University Press: Johannesburg, 2014.
- Penny Siopis, Grief, Stevenson: Cape Town, 2016.
- Penny Siopis, Shame, Stevenson: Cape Town, 2016.
- Penny Siopis, Material Acts, Stevenson: Cape Town, 2019.
- Karen Milbourne, I Am...Contemporary Women Artists of Africa, Washington DC: Smithsonian National Museum of African Art, 2019.
