= Jane Alexander (artist) =

South African artist (born 1959)

- Born: 1959 (age 66–67); Johannesburg, South Africa
- Notable work: The Butcher Boys, The Bom Boys, African Adventure, The Sacrifices of God are a Troubled Spirit, and Security with traffic (influx control)

Jane Alexander (born 1959) is one of the most celebrated artists in South Africa. She is a female artist best known for her sculpture, The Butcher Boys. She works in sculpture, photomontages, photography and video. Alexander is interested in human behavior, conflicts in history, cultural memories of abuse and the lack of global interference during apartheid. Alexander's work is relevant both in the current Post- Apartheid social environment in South Africa and abroad.

== Biography ==
Alexander was born in Johannesburg, South Africa, in 1959. She grew up in the peak of South African Apartheid in the early 1980s. Growing up during the time of apartheid in South Africa, Alexander was sheltered from the police and street violence of the time until she moved to Braamfontein, South Africa to be closer to her university. Art instruction was included in the curriculum for whites, but not for blacks or Indians. In 1959, law decreed that only whites could undertake fine art training at universities or tech schools. In the late 1970s, art had to choose to focus on form over content or combating apartheid through art. From 1985 to 1989 – during States of Emergency – white artists like Alexander had greater liberties to challenge apartheid and bring awareness to the rest of the world through their art.

Her interest in these issues influenced her subsequent installations and art pieces. Inspired early on in her career by the figurative works of George Segal, Ed and Nancy Kienholz, Duane Hanson, and David Goldblatt. Alexander attended the University of the Witwatersrand, where she obtained a bachelor's degree and a Master of Arts in Fine Arts in 1982 and 1988. Currently, she is senior lecturer of sculpture, photography and Drawing at Michaelis school of fine art in Cape Town where she has taught since 1998.

=== Artist process ===
Mutilated by the violence of Apartheid, Alexander's pieces often contain opposing themes of attraction and repulsion, Human and Animal and Grotesque yet vulnerable. The human-animals in her work can be seen as the inhuman nature of apartheid society. The distinctions in Alexander's work between the victim and the victimizers, the oppressor and the oppressed are blurred. Her hybrid forms suggest the normalizing of the grotesque motricity of violence such as apartheid and the capability of ordinary individuals to become the ruthless aggressors when forming part of a collective with an agenda of oppression and violence. These grotesque figures do not horrify us because they are inhuman, rather, because they are so fundamentally human. Alexander's work also shows the potential for human resilience, empowerment and dignity in the face of violence, adversity, and oppression, as well as the insecurity, and fear of those in positions of power. Her human-animals send out warnings about the consequences of history and hint at possible futures. Her work portrays politically and socially charged characters without ever making her exact message opaquely obvious, nor does she use signifiers such as banners, slogans or propaganda images.

Alexander prefers to work with site-specific pieces, especially those with historical, societal or spiritual resonances and often produces work that can be interchangeable between different site-specific installations. Alexander does not put work on a pedestal and avoids any obvious barriers between the work and the viewer. In the past she was known to drag rotting carcasses into her studio for their bones. She casts or models her sculptures in plaster, building them to the proportions of her friends and colleagues, and paints her modeled figures with oil paints. Other materials of choice ceramic, fiberglass, animal bones, and animal horns. She also uses found objects and materials in many of her pieces, such as shoes and garments. One of her figures even wore an authentic South African prison uniform.

== Notable works ==
=== The Butcher Boys ===
During the course of her master's degree in the years 1985 and 1986, Alexander produced one of her most recognizable pieces of art; The Butcher Boys. The Butcher Boys is a sculpture of three men with a grotesque appearance made out of plaster, all sitting on a bench. The piece comments on the bestiality and dehumanizing effects of violence in Apartheid era South Africa. In an article in The New York Times, Holland Cotter describes that "their bodies, white-skinned and muscular, are superb, but with suture lines running from navel to throat, also disturbing". This line that Cotter describes is a dark vertical scar that implies the larynx has been removed which would render each figure unable to speak. The piece includes exposed backbones as well as various horns on each figure, all of which were used from animals. The piece has one of the most widespread recognition in the South African National Gallery.

=== Bom Boys ===
Created in 1998, Bom Boys consists of a number of small, standing, grey-skinned figures. Some figures are partially clothed and others are naked, and each wears a mask or blindfold. They are all looking in different directions suggesting isolation and abandonment. The figures in this piece refer to the vulnerability of the displaced children in Cape Town, which the artist herself had observed while living there. It is unclear if the figures are predatory, or preyed upon.

=== African Adventure ===
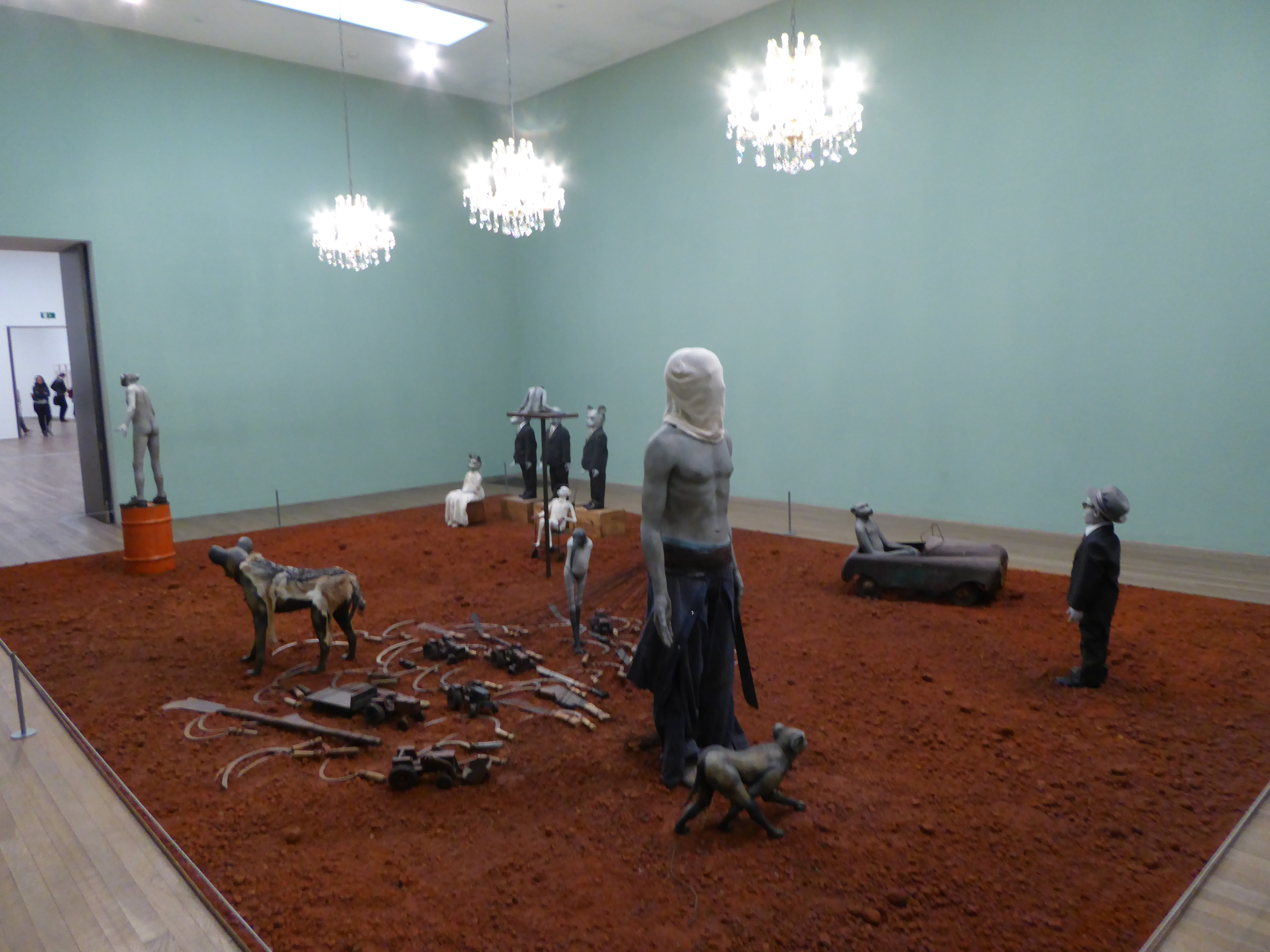
African Adventure by Jane Alexander, 1999-2002, Tate Modern, Bankside, London, England, November 2016

Made in 1999–2002, African Adventure is a site-specific installation originally made for the British Officers' Mess of the Castle of Good Hope in Cape Town, and later installed at the Tate Modern. This piece contains thirteen human, animal, and human-animal hybrids, as well as a wide array of found objects. The floor of the installation is covered in red earth, and in the center there is a half naked man who drags a variety of farming tools behind him, and has a linen bag over his head, and a machete in his hand. This man may refer to Elias Xitavhudzi, a South African serial killer who murdered his victims with a machete. This piece is also said to comment on colonialism, identity, democracy, and the residues of apartheid.

=== The Sacrifices of God are a Troubled Spirit ===
The Sacrifices of God are a Troubled Spirit was created in 2004 for as a site-specific installation for the world's largest Gothic cathedral, at the Cathedral of St John the Divine which is in located in New York. Alexander's was inspired by the architecture of the Cathedral, as were the seventeen other artists who created works for this exhibition. Alexander's installation comprises six figures, including a lamb with scarecrow-like stick arms, wearing a white dress, red gloves, blue rubber boots, and a crown of golden thorns, and a tall slender human-animal hybrid figure, holding a walking stick and wearing black boots, with one straight horn with a flag at the end, and one horn that is curled around on itself on his antelope-like head. There is also a hoofed animal with bound legs who carried a battered looking monkey on its back, a tall monkey figure with black boots and a jackal tail, a small four-legged animal, and vulture-like figure without wings or arms, who has bloody feet. All six figures are arranged together standing on copious amounts of red rubber gloves, in front of a large painting in the Cathedral. This piece was based in Psalm 51, a prayer for the remission of sins, with the lamb figure most likely symbolizing a sacrifice.

=== Security with traffic (influx control) ===
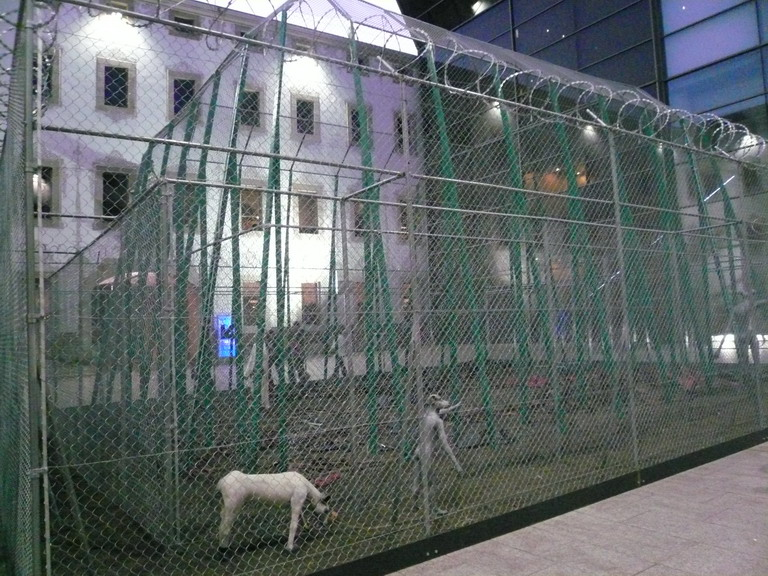
Security with traffic (influx control), installation by Jane Alexander in CCCB, Barcelona 2007.

Inside the triple barrier fencing in Alexanders 2007 piece Security with traffic (influx control) there is dark earth spread on the ground which is partly covered by matches, sickles, gloves and inner tubes. There is also a diverse group of hybrid creates inside. Alexander created this piece in reference to a barrier financed by the European union and built by the Spanish government in Melilla, which blocks an entrance into EU territory. This piece is also likely a commentary on migration, surveillance, land resources and ownership, and exploitation.

== Public exhibitions ==
=== Solo exhibitions ===
- 1986 Newtown, Johannesburg: Market Gallery
- 1995 Grahamstown, South Africa: Monument Gallery
- 1999 Cape Town: Irma Stern Museum, University of Cape Town
- 2000 London: Gasworks
- 2002 Stuttgart, Germany: DaimlerChrysler Konzernzentrale, Forum Stuttgart-Moringen
- 2005 Vienna: Kunsthalle Wien
- 2009 Durham, UK: Galilee Chapel, Durham Cathedral
- 2009 New York: Jack Shainman Gallery
- 2011 Brussels: La Centrale Electrique
- 2012 New York: Museum for African Art

=== Group exhibitions ===
- 1994 Havana: Museo Nacional de Bellas Arte, 5th Havana Biennial
- 1995 Venice: Palazzo Grassi, Venice Biennale
- 1996 Berlin: Haus der Kulturen der Welt
- 1996 Cape Town: Castle of Good Hope
- 1997 Munich: Art Bureau
- 1998 Dakar, Senegal: Galerie Nationale, Dak’Art Biennale
- 1998 Tokyo: Tobu Museum of Art
- 1999 Cape Town: The Granary
- 1999 Accra, Ghana: National Museum Accra
- 2000 Lyon, France: Halle Tony Garnier, Biennale de Lyon
- 2000 Reykjavik: Reykjavik Art Museum
- 2000 Cape Town: IDASA Gallery, Talk. Thetha, Praat
- 2000 Havana: Centro De Arte Contemporaneo Wilfredp Lam, 7th Havana Biennial
- 2000 London, British Museum
- 2001 Munich: Museum Villa Stuck
- 2001 Barcelona: Centre de Cultura Contemorania de Barcelona
- 2001 Madrid: Circulo de Bellas Artes
- 2002 Paris: Maison Europeenne de la Photographie
- 2002 Berlin: Neue Gesellschaft fur Bildende Kunst
- 2003 Waltham, MA: Rose Art Museum, Brandeis University
- 2003 Stockholm: NK Car Park
- 2004 Charleroi, Belgium: palais des Beaux-Arts
- 2004 Cape Town: Castle of Good Hope
- 2004 Düsseldorf: Museum Kunst Palast
- 2004 Tilburg, the Netherlands: Oude Warande
- 2004 New York: Cathedral Church of St. John the Divine and the Museum for African Art
- 2005 North Adams, MA: Mass MoCA
- 2005 Bamako, Mali: Musee National du Mali
- 2006 Ostend: Provinciaal Museum voor Modernde Kunst and the North Sea Cost of Belgium
- 2006 Brussels: La Centrale Electrique
- 2006 Singapore: City Hall, Singapore Biennale
- 2006 São Paulo: Museu de Arte Moderna de São Paulo, Bienal de São Paulo
- 2007 Goteborg, Sweden: Roda Sten, Goteborg International Biennial
- 2007 Barcelona: Centre de Cultura Contemprania de Barcelona
- 2008 Johannesburg: FADA Gallery, University of Johannesburg
- 2008 Polokwane, South Africa: Polowwane Art Museum
- 2009 Havana: Saint Francis of Assisi Convent, Havana Biennial
- 2009 Johannesburg: Sandton Convention Centre
- 2009 Paris: Grande Halle de La Villette
- 2009 Khayelitsha, South Africa: Lookout Hill
- 2009 Osaka Japan: Dojima River Forum, Dojima River Biennial
- 2009 Tirana, Albania: Hotel Dajti, Tirana International Contemporary Art Biennial
- 2009 Cape Town: Spier
- 2009 Cape Town: South African National Gallery
- 2010 Cape Town: Cape Institute for Architecture
- 2010 Cape Town: South African National Gallery
- 2010 Cape Town: Michael Stevenson Gallery
- 2010 Cradle of Humankind, Gauteng, South Africa: NIROX Sculpture Park
- 2010 Helsinki: Tennis Palace Art Museum
- 2010 Baltimore: Maryland Institute College of Art

== Awards ==
Jane Alexander has won several awards during her career as a solo and group artist. Alexander has work displayed in several public collections, including the South African National Gallery, Tatham Art Gallery, Johannesburg Art Gallery, and the public collection at University of Witwatersrand.

Awards include:

- 1982 – National Fine Arts Student Award
- 1982 – Martienssen Student Prize
- 1995 – Standard Bank Young Artist Award
- 1996 – Joint winner of the First National Bank Artist of the Year
- 1996 – The FNB Vita Art Now Award
- 2002 – DaimlerChrysler Award
- 2004 – University of Cape Town Fellowship
