= Henri Vergon =

South African art dealer

Henri Vergon (surnamed Nkosi) (6 August 1968 in Brussels - 15 May 2020) was a South African art dealer based in Johannesburg.

== Biography ==
Born in Brussels, Vergon graduated from EDHEC Business School and worked in both the United States and Paris before joining the French Institute of South Africa in Johannesburg as a cultural officer in 1995. He witnessed the emergence of the post-apartheid art movement, he became passionate about panafrican arts.

Vergon founded the Afronova gallery in Newtown, Johannesburg in 2005. Afronova was originally a physical gallery exhibiting modern and contemporary works. Notable exhibitions included Malick Sidibé (Mali, 2007, the first time the artist was exhibited outside of Mali), Ricardo Rangel (Mozambique, 2008), Gerard Sekoto (South Africa, 2008) and Billie Zangewa (Malawi/South Africa, 2004, artist that he discovered). With partner Emilie Demon, Vergon moved the gallery to Braamfontein in 2010 before deciding to close the physical space of the gallery in 2014. Afronova as a platform was formed. Vergon described Afronova as “a polyphonic platform for African contemporary expressions.”

Henri Vergon died on 15 May 2020 of a heart attack. Émilie Demon took over as sole manager of the Afronova gallery.

== Private life ==
Henri Vergon met his wife Émilie Démon in Japan in the early 2000s. He would organize an artistis' diner every Friday nights at the restaurant Gramadoelas, and organized numerous artists' parties at his house in Parkhurst.
