= KwaZulu Natal Society of Arts =

Coordinates: 29°51′36″S 30°59′49″E

KZNSA - KwaZulu Natal Society of Arts
- Established: 1902
- Location: Durban South Africa
- Type: Art Center, Art Gallery, Art Museum
- Website: https://www.kznsagallery.co.za/

KwaZulu Natal Society of Arts (KZNSA) is a nonprofit art gallery and art center in Durban, South Africa.

== History ==
KwaZulu Natal Society of Arts, one of the first art centers in Durban, was founded in 1902 in Glenwood, Durban, as a not-for-profit, public benefit organization with 18A status. Initially established as an opportunity for artists to show and discuss their works, it experienced major growth and transformations. The key components of the organizations are the gallery exhibitions and public education programs, seminars, and specialist conferences. Linked to an extensive network of national institutions, it promotes cultural exchange with a belief in inclusivity. Essentially a gallery for contemporary art it promotes national and international artists with an inclination towards artists of the province.

=== Exhibitions ===
The KZNSA Gallery has shown exhibitions by artists such as Thando Mama (2005), Markus Wörsdörfer, (2018), William Kentridge, Theaster Gates, Cameron Platter, Jeremy Wafer, Mbongeni Buthelezi, Tom Cullberg, Penny Siopis, Callan Grecia, Derrick Nxumalo, and young artist and fashion designer Gumede in 2023. The gallery takes part in Go Durban Durban's Connect03, a first Thursday event. In 2024 they hosted the exhibition "Reflections of Apollo" by the Apollo Queer Art Collective with works by Franco Zucchella, Quinton Lehnert, Daniel Garbade, Peter Garrard, Michael Biello, José Gomez and Raúl Moya-Mula, and the exhibition of the Rust-en-Vrede Gallery Portraits Award 2024 with more than 40 works.

=== Film festival ===
They host several film festivals, like the Diff Short Films ( 2018) and the second International Film Festival, showcasing 30 student films in 2023.

=== Music ===
The center offers diverse music performances with live concerts by Raheem Kemet, Lungelo Manzi, Zoe The Seed, Madala Kunene, Kerolin Govender Zawadi Yamungu or Guy Buttery in 2019.

== Building ==
Constructed on a trapezoidal site located between two roads and an Edwardian villa, the building is the result of a public competition. Constructed in 1996 by the architects Cindy Walters and Michál Cohen on an area of 1000m2, it is set back from the main villa and looks at an intermediate garden with under-the-sky seating amidst indigenous acacia trees. A staircase links the two roads, allowing access from both to the mezzanine level. The compound includes a shop for handmade merchandise and art from other African countries.
