= Ike Moriz =

German-South African musician and actor

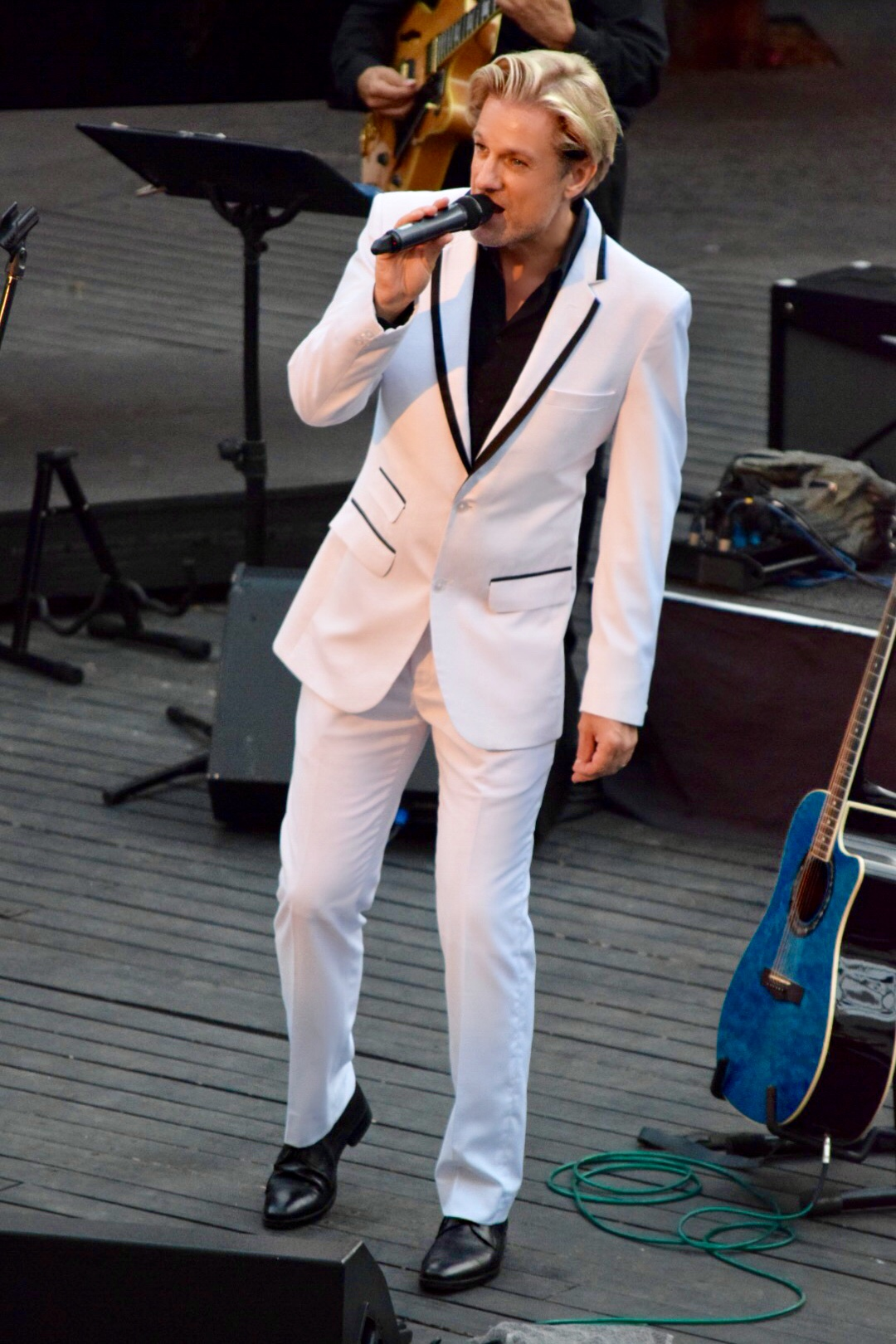
- Ike Moriz at Oude Libertas Amphitheatre, Stellenbosch, South Africa, 2018

Background information
- Born: Eike Moriz; May 14, 1972 (age 54); Friedberg, Hesse, West Germany
- Genres: Pop; Rock; Jazz; Swing; Blues; Easy Listening; latin
- Occupations: Singer, songwriter, composer
- Instruments: Vocals, piano, guitar
- Years active: 1995-now
- Label: Mosquito Records London Pty Ltd.
- Website: https://www.ikemoriz.com/

Eike Moriz (born May 14, 1972), better known as Ike Moriz, is a German-South African singer, songwriter, musician, record producer and actor. He has released 20 albums in the indie rock, pop, Latin, easy listening, dance, lounge, blues, jazz and swing genres.

== Early life ==
Ike Moriz grew up in Wentorf near Hamburg, West Germany. The son of the jewellers Kai and Waltraud Moriz attended the Wentorf primary school from 1978 and thereafter from 1982 the Wentorf grammar school, where he was also head boy from 1988 to 1989. During this time he acted in theatre plays directed by Hans Bittner, who was also his piano teacher. After graduating in 1991, he completed his compulsory one-year military service. From 1992 to 1993 he went to South Africa to work on his uncle's citrus farm in Clanwilliam in the Western Cape.

== Studies ==
Returning to Hamburg, Moriz studied economics at the University of Hamburg from 1993 to 1995 and gave his first concerts as the lead singer of several rock bands. He also played his first parts in English-language theatre plays. He then studied jazz, rock and pop music at the Carl Maria von Weber Academy of Music in Dresden from 1995 to 1999 under Professor Hanns-Herbert Schulz. As part of his course, he took part in a twelve-months student exchange programme at the South African College of Music in Cape Town and the Conservatory of Music in Rotterdam (Erasmus Programme) from 1997 to 1998. He received two degrees (Bachelor of Music and Bachelor of Music Education).

== Career ==
=== London (1999–2005) ===
Ike Moriz lived in London from late 1999 to early 2005. Initially, he performed as a street musician, then as the lead vocalist and keyboard player of the indie rock band Stunt Double and eventually as a solo singer with a backup band. In 2002 Moriz played his first leading role in the American musical Saving Anne at the Greenwich Theatre. He founded his record company, Mosquito Records London Pty Ltd., and recorded his first hit single Fall Into The Sun at Tin Pan Alley Studios in 2002 with producer Steve Kent. This was followed by his first two solo albums, which he recorded and produced at Motion Studios from 2002 to 2005. They were mixed and mastered by Alan van Kleef. Moriz's songs reached number one on various radio stations in the UK, the Netherlands, South Africa and Germany and were played on the radio in seventeen countries around the world. British singer David Bowie voted Ike Moriz's songs 'Top Song of the Week' several times on his website. In 2004 Moriz performed at the Ukkasie Arts Festival in London with several other South African artists such as Heinz Winckler, Nianell and Steve Hofmeyr.

Moriz also played minor roles and cameos in international feature films such as Alfie (2004), Shanghai Knights (2003) and Love Actually (2003), as well as in South African and British TV series such as EastEnders, Strike Back: Project Dawn (2011), Backstage (2006) and The Bill.

=== South Africa and international (since 2005) ===
Moriz has been living officially in South Africa since May 2005, where he immediately received a lot of media coverage with his second album Play Me and its single releases I Feel Real and Play Me. With national television and radio interviews, music videos, appearances in Cape Town and Johannesburg, and articles in magazines and daily newspapers, he quickly became known nationwide and was voted one of the country's top five singers in 2006.

This was followed by another album in the pop-rock genre, All Around The World (2007), which he presented for the first time with launch concerts at FashionTV cafés in both Johannesburg and Cape Town. The album launch in Cape Town took place at the same time as CD launch parties in Germany, the Netherlands and Great Britain.

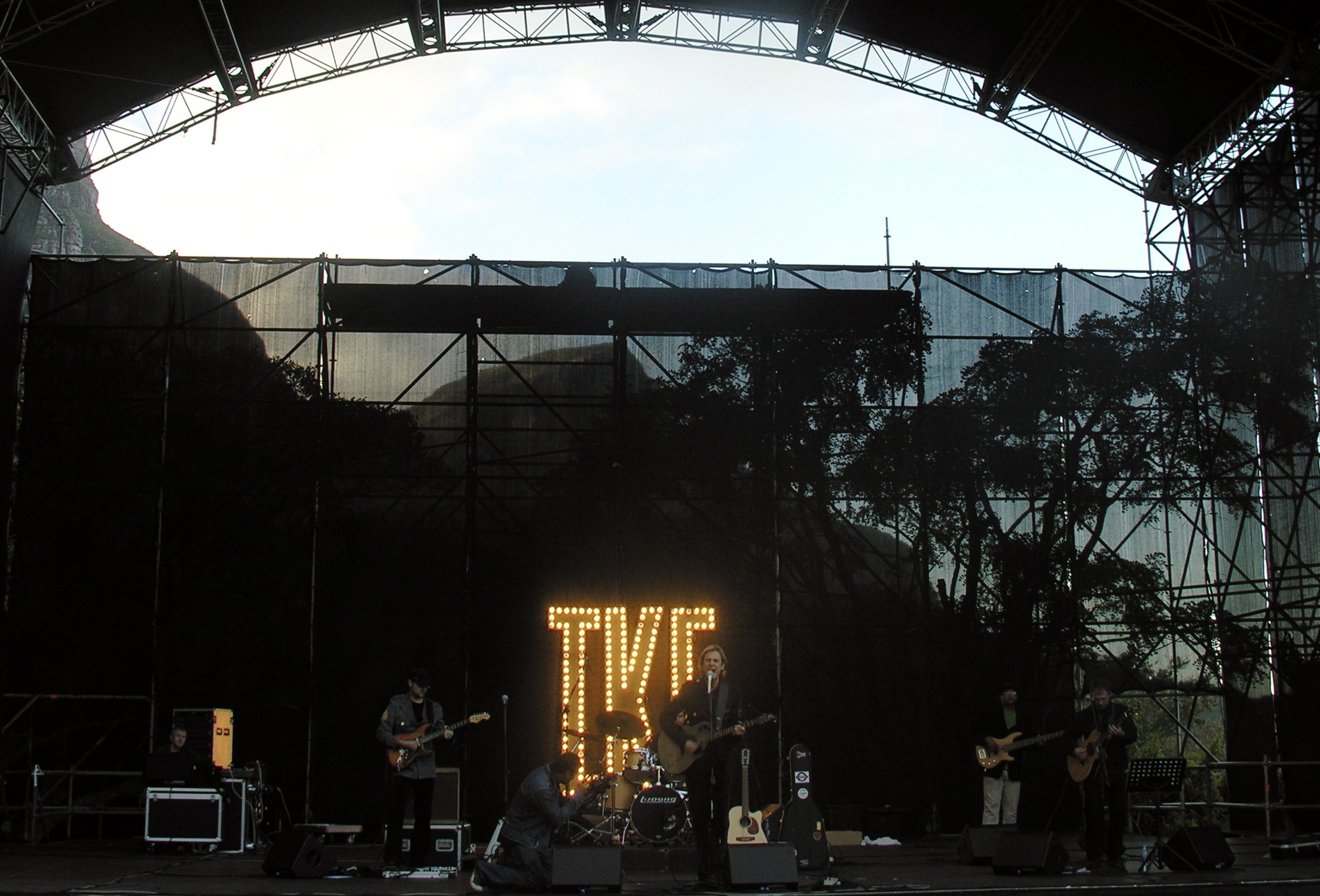
Ike Moriz at Kirstenbosch National Botanical Garden (March 2007)

Moriz performs regularly with a variety of accompanying musicians in Cape Town and Johannesburg, e.g., at Oude Libertas Amphitheatre, the Victoria & Alfred Waterfront, Kirstenbosch National Botanical Garden, numerous hotels and various clubs, theatres and wine farms. In April 2008 he gave a concert on the occasion of the 125th anniversary celebration of the German International School Cape Town.

In 2008, Moriz, who was previously known mainly as an indie pop and rock singer, began to explore a variety of other styles, starting with the release of his Stardust trilogy (2009), which consisted of three albums in the swing and jazz genre. The new style opened the door to an even larger audience, especially in the so-called African capital of jazz, Cape Town, where the fourth largest jazz festival in the world has been held annually since 2000. In the same year he published the Christmas album Starry Night, for which he also filmed a music video in Germany at the Hamburg observatory where he also performed several times at the vision sternwARTe festival on occasion of its 100-year anniversary.

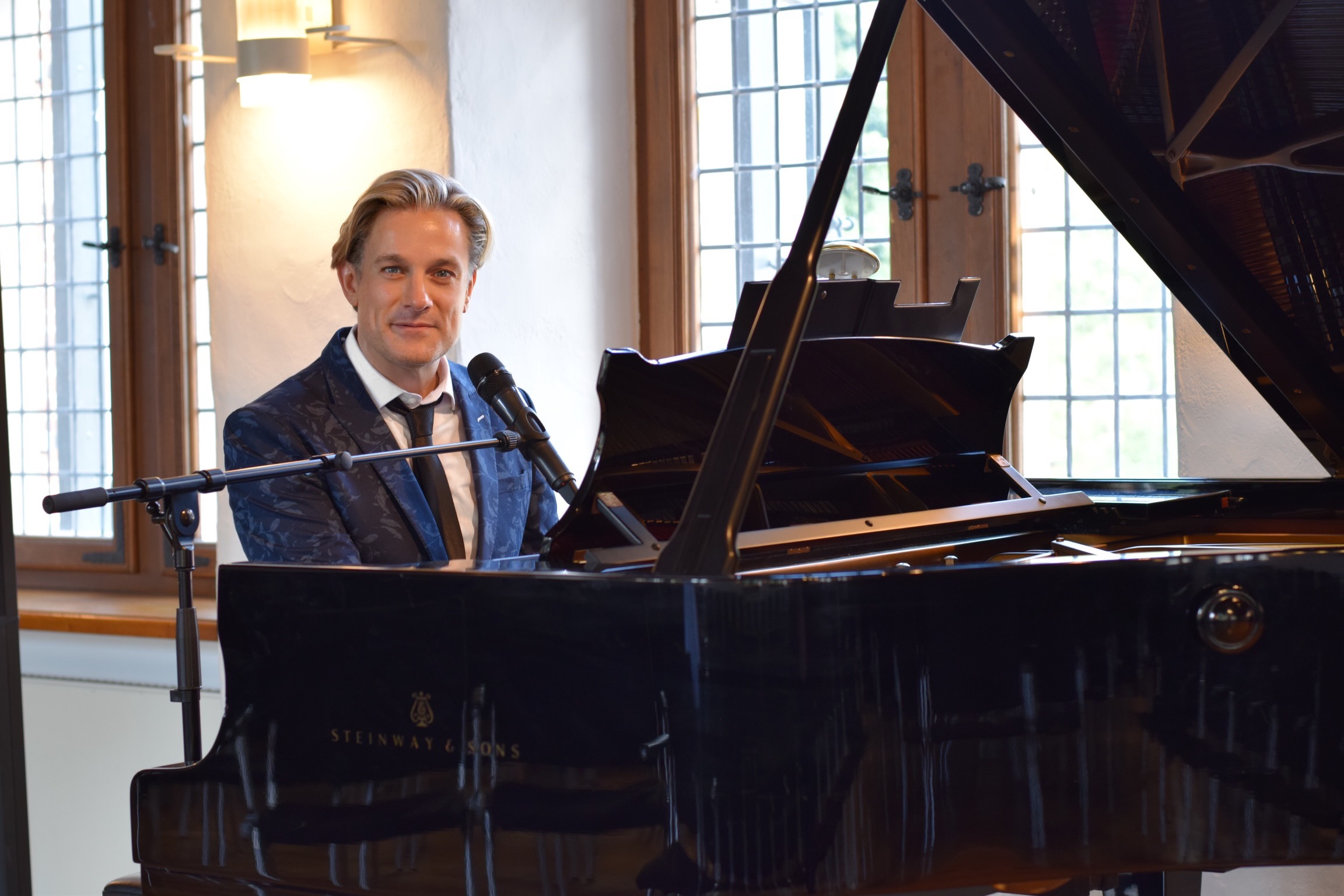
Ike Moriz at Castle Reinbek in 2022

Since moving to South Africa, Moriz has recorded all of his albums and singles at Paris Recording Studios in Fish Hoek, Cape Town, where he has also produced other artists (such as Brothers With Voices Cape Town). Between 2010 and 2016, seven more jazz and swing albums followed, as well as albums in the easy listening, Latin, lounge, blues and pop-rock genres, such as his swing albums Siren Terpsichore (2012) and Love Swings (2015) and the blues album At Last (2014). In 2018, after his album Gold Rush (2017), Moriz, for the first time, released a ‘best-of’ compilation album entitled Millennium Hits 2002-2018. In April of the same year, Moriz's first Afrikaans-language single was released, a cover of the Louis van Rensburg song Voshaarnooi. Moriz's latest album, Dragons, was released on his birthday on May 14, 2020, during the South African COVID-19 lockdown, along with the music video of his song Say Your Name. Moriz did embark on a short 'Dragons Tour' with saxophonist Kurt Buschmann in Germany in late 2021 and in summer 2022 to promote his new album. During the tour he performed at castle Vietgest, St. Michael's Church, Hamburg as well as castle Reinbek where he performed Billy Joel's anti war song Leningrad during an interview on the German TV channel NDR 3. Moriz returned to Northern Germany for another tour from late June to early August 2023 performing with saxophonists Kurt Buschmann and Leandro Saint-Hill as well as South African pianist Charl Du Plessis.

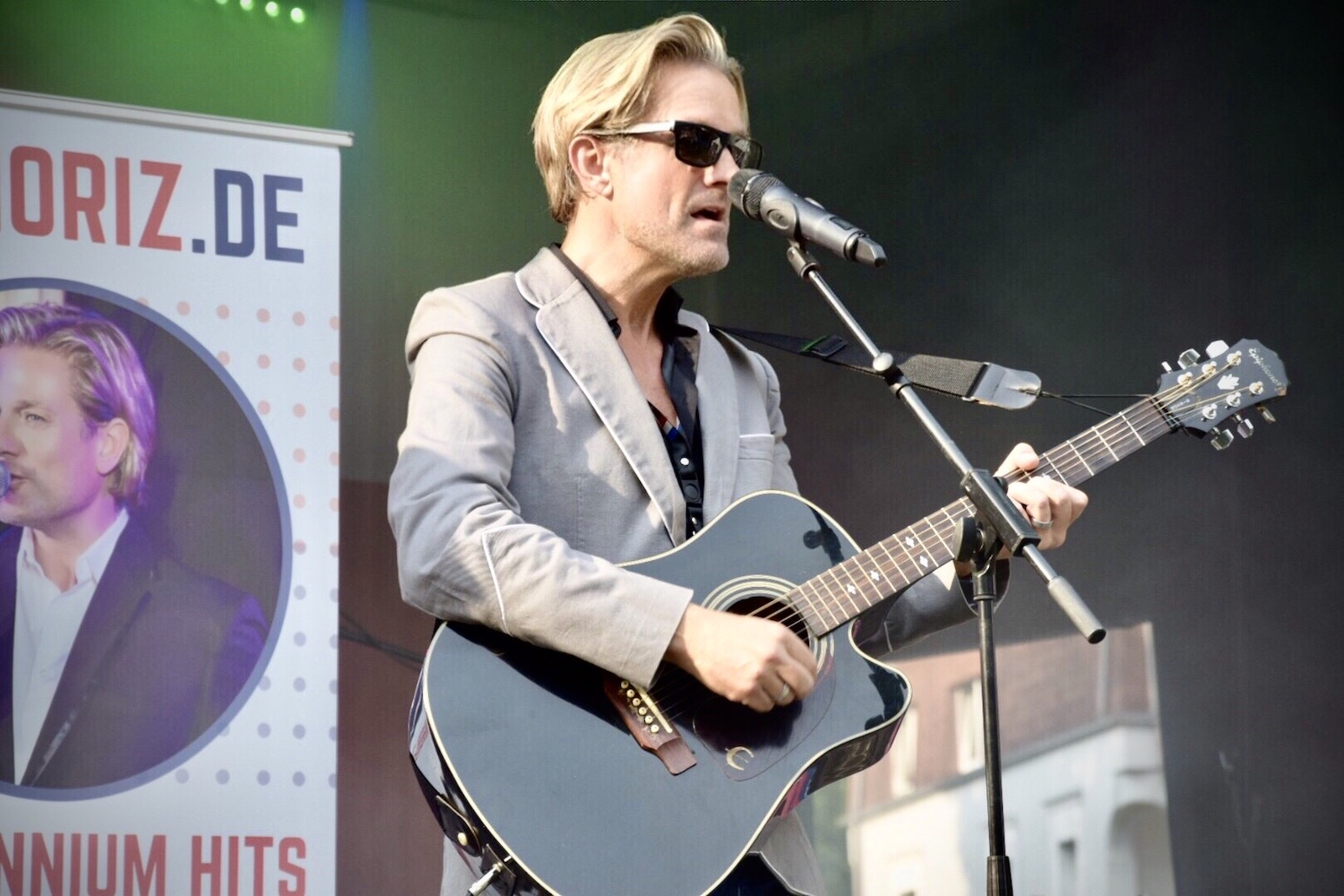
Ike Moriz on the channel NDR 3 stage at the Bergedorf city festival, Germany, July 2018

The versatile songwriter sings in English, but has also sung songs in German, Afrikaans, Spanish, Xhosa and French. Since 2010 he has been touring in Germany every year. In South Africa, Moriz collaborates, plays and tours with renowned studio musicians and music groups such as the Cape Town Philharmonic Orchestra, the Ike Moriz Swing Band, saxophonist Willie Van Zyl, guitarists Willem Moller, Gregory Schoeman, Gorm Helfjord, Alvin Dyers and David Leadbetter, drummers Kevin Gibson, Paul Tizzard, Ivan Bell, Shaun Michau, Barry van Zyl (Johnny Clegg Band) and Tony & Frank Paco, pianists Andrew Ford, Charl Du Plessis, Amanda Tiffin, Muriel Marco, Jason Reolon and the bass players Robert Nel, Wesley Rustin, Emilio Gassibe, Dave Ridgeway, and Charles Lazar. Other South African singers such as Judith Sephuma, Monique Hellenberg, Elana Afrika and Melanie Scholtz have also performed or recorded songs with him.

During his career, Ike Moriz has performed in eighteen countries: South Africa, UK, Germany, Namibia, Morocco, Spain, Italy, Greece, France, Portugal, Senegal, Malta, Turkey, the Netherlands, Luxembourg, Canary Islands, Botswana and Belgium. All of his musical works have been released through CD Baby and his own record label Mosquito Records London Pty Ltd., distributed by Jassics Music (jazz albums) and Select Music Distribution (first three albums and maxi singles). His catalogue of works is "sub-published" in South Africa by Sheer Publishing.

== Charity work ==
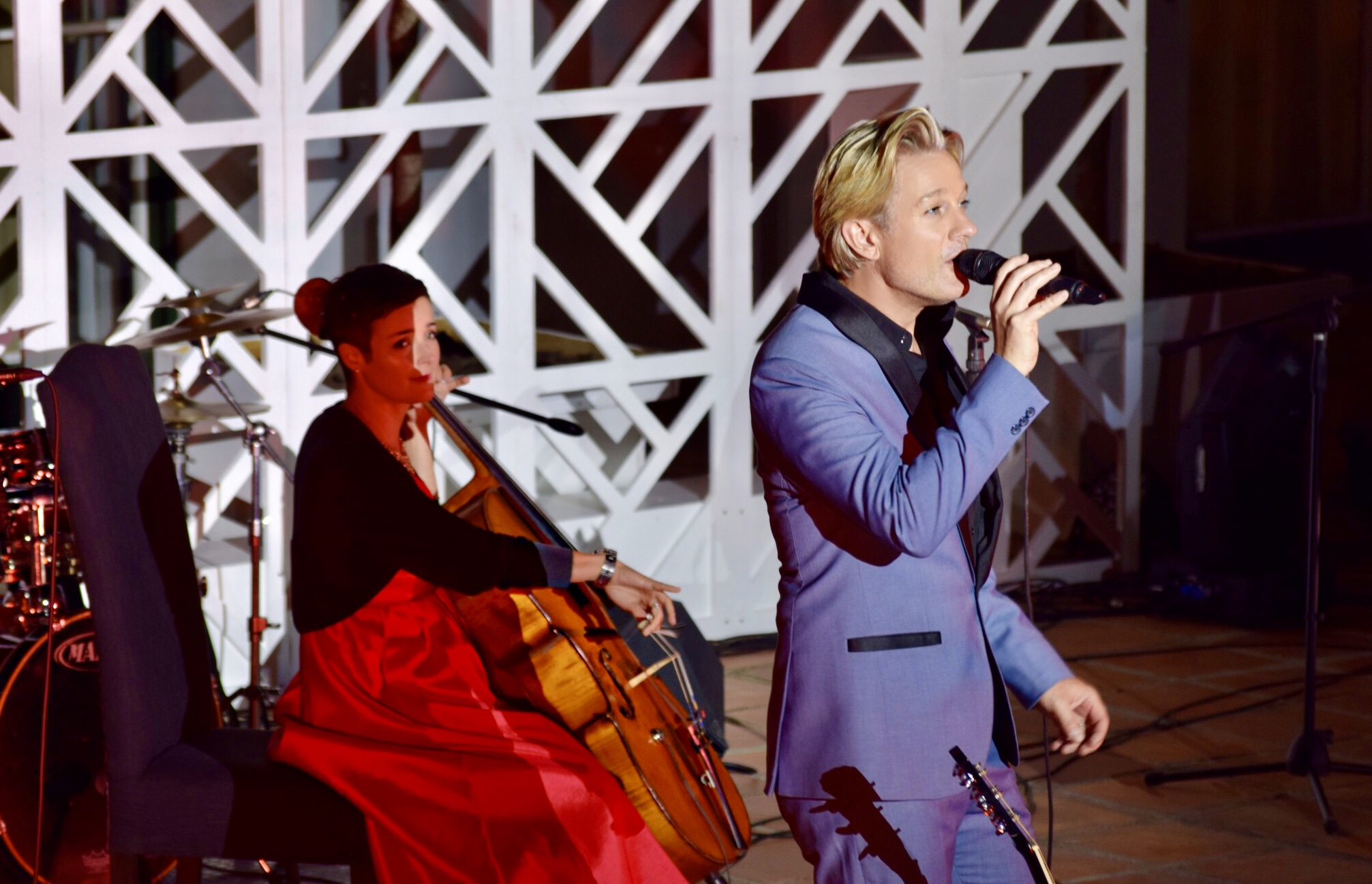
Ike Moriz Swing Band concert in Paarl, South Africa (2020)

Together with the photographer and writer Kiara Worth, Moriz founded and championed the environmental protection interest group 'Fresh Air For Hout Bay' in 2014, for which he wrote, recorded and published the protest song "Lucky Star Ain't What You Are". Moriz and Worth also created and lead the air pollution portfolio of the HBRRA (Hout Bay Residents and Rate Payers Association) in the same year. The group was founded in response to the air pollution of a fishmeal factory in Hout Bay. Moriz and Worth were interviewed in numerous newspaper articles and continued to volunteer as the group's spokespersons for 6 years until the closure of the factory in 2020.

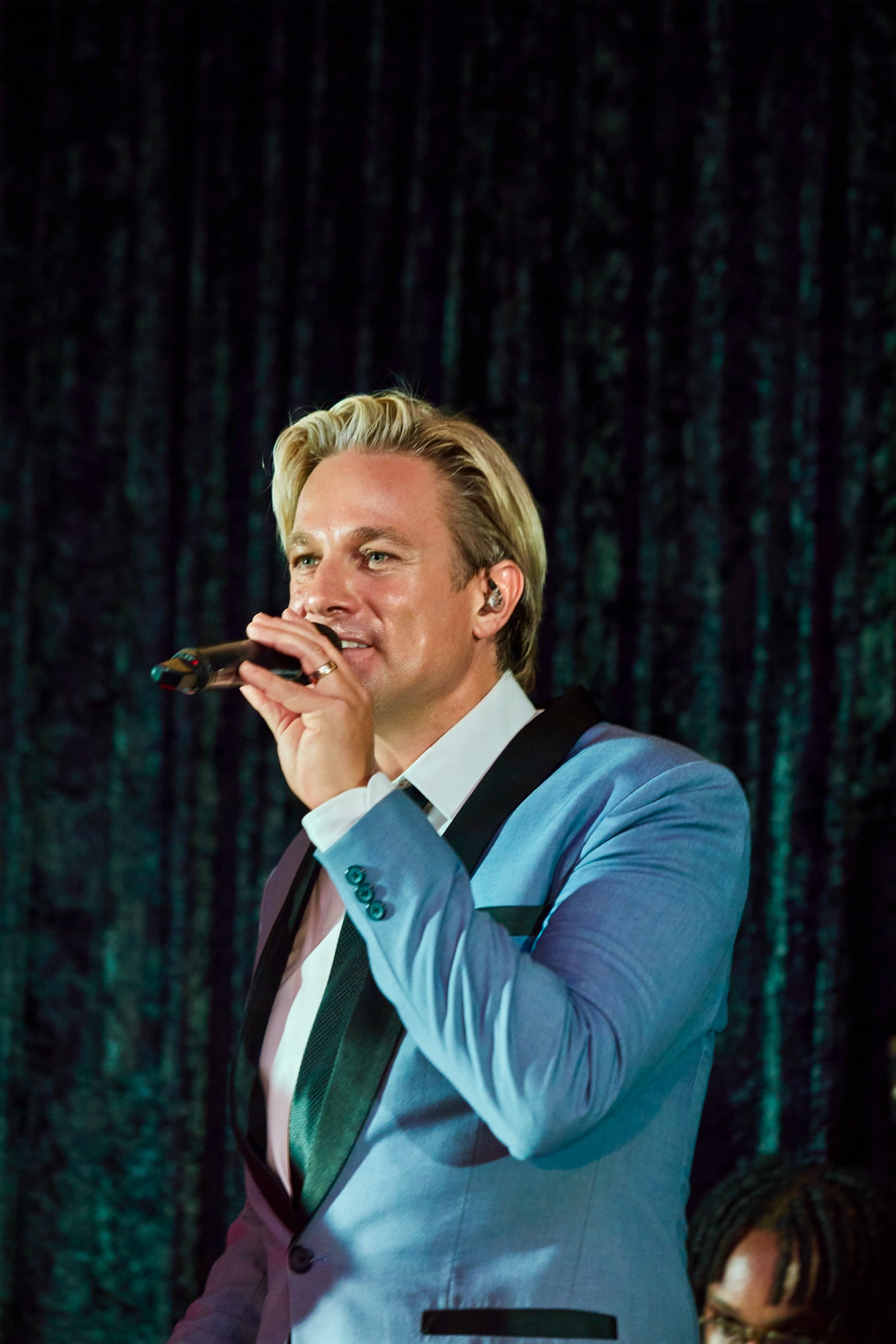
Ike Moriz singing at the Ball of HOPE 2025 at the Westin Hotel ball-room with the Ike Moriz Swing Band in Cape Town, South Africa, 10 May 2025

During the Cape Peninsula mountain fires in March 2015, Moriz composed an anthem for the South African Volunteer Wildfire Services, called Heroes In Red to raise funds for the organisation.

He has also endorsed the Cape Town animal welfare association D.A.R.G. with free concerts and played at charity events to help fund epilepsy research at the Red Cross War Memorial Children's Hospital in Cape Town with the ‘Alexi and Me’ campaign. Moriz regularly performs at Rotarian events in Cape Town to sponsor their community projects. In September 2008 Ike Moriz appeared as one of the main acts of the ‘Zimfest’ together with other well-known bands such as Freshlyground and The Rudimentals in order to endorse the work of the NGO PASSOP (People Against Suffering, Oppression and Poverty). In 2006 Moriz took part in the recording of Greatest Love Of All with thirteen other South African celebrities in order to raise money for the ‘Differently Abled 24/7/365‘ initiative.

Moriz, an avid runner, also sponsors the NGO Sakhisizwe youth development programme in Imizamo Yethu, Hout Bay, where he volunteers regularly at the local Parkrun. In August 2022, Moriz gave a sold-out concert at Hamburg's main landmark, the St. Michaelis Church, in support of the children's aid organisation ‘Plan International, after the concert had first been postponed in 2020 due to the COVID-19 pandemic in Germany.

On 10 May 2025 Ike performed with his swing band at the annual Ball of HOPE at the Westin Grand Hotel in Cape Town in support of the holistic development agency HOPE Cape Town.

== Personal life ==
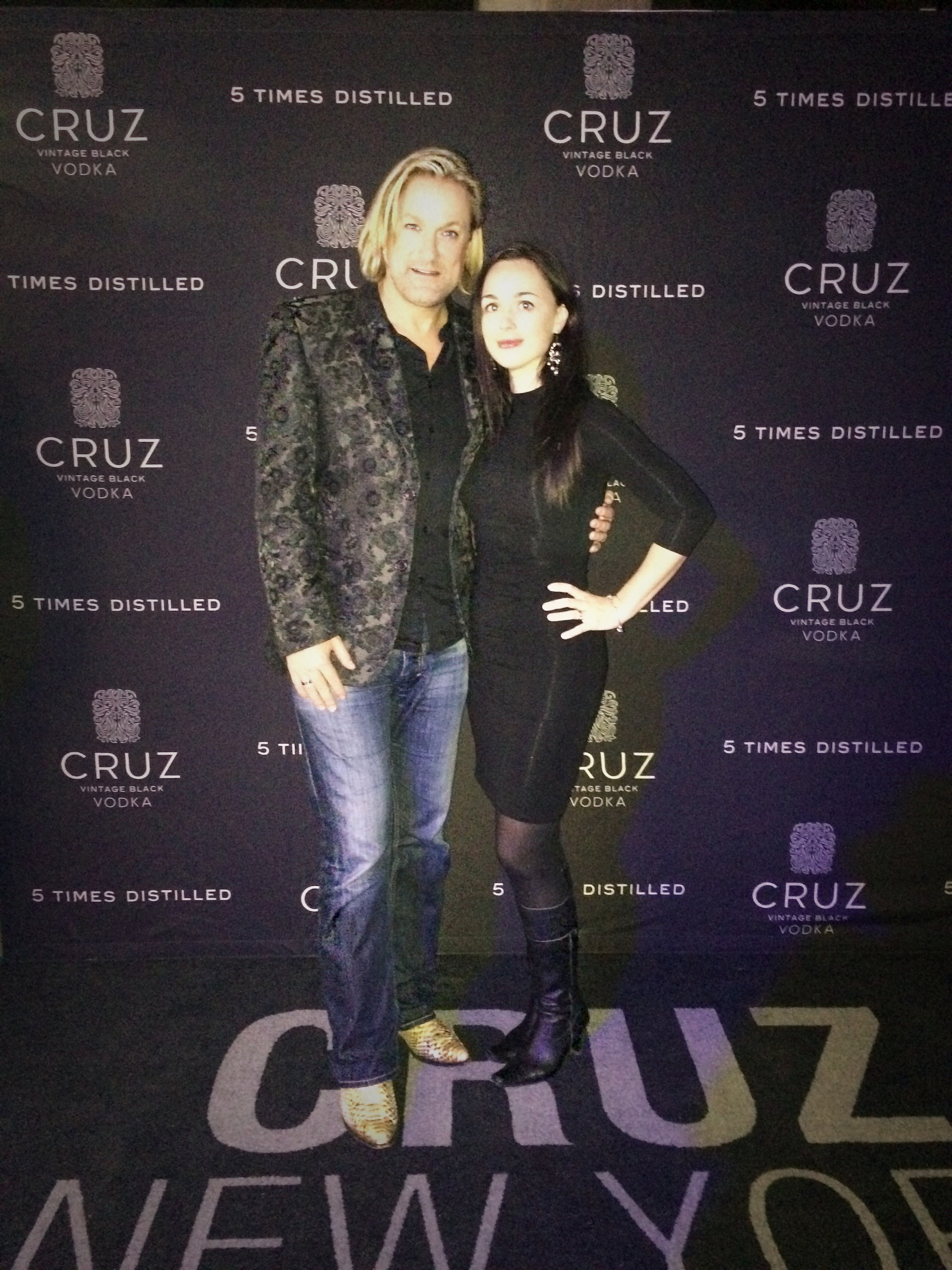
Ike Moriz and his wife Madri, Cape Town Stadium (2015)

In 2012, Ike Moriz married Madri Le Roux-Moriz, the sister of South African singer Nataniël. They live together with their daughters Sofia Marie and Kateline in Hout Bay in the Western Cape. On the famous Chapman’s Peak Mountain, a rock formation was named after Ike Moriz (‘Ike’s Thumb') in 2012.

== Discography ==
=== Albums ===
- 2004: Mirrors And Shade (catalogue no. MOS0003, UPC: 634479004261)
- 2005: Play Me (catalogue no. MOS0005, UPC: 634479171659)
- 2007: All Around The World (catalogue no. MOS0006, UPC: 634479634215)
- 2009: Stardust (catalogue no. MOS0008, UPC: 884502111019)
- 2009: Body and Soul (catalogue no. MOS0007, UPC: 884502110944)
- 2009: Angel Eyes (catalogue no. MOS0009, UPC: 884502133356)
- 2009: Starry Night (catalogue no. MOS0010, UPC: 884502152654)
- 2010: Blue Moon (catalogue no. MOS0011, UPC: 884502361964)
- 2010: Charade (catalogue no. MOS0012, UPC: 884502783612)
- 2011: C'est Si Bon (catalogue no. MOS0013, UPC: 885767504462)
- 2011: Sunday (catalogue no. MOS0014, UPC: 885767568020)
- 2011: Breathing Dreams (catalogue no. MOS0015, UPC: 885767791848)
- 2012: Siren Terpsichore (catalogue no. MOS0017, UPC: 885767124417)
- 2014: At Last (catalogue no. MOS0018, UPC: 888174506364)
- 2014: Nobody Does It Better (catalogue no. MOS0021, UPC: 889211179251)
- 2015: Love Swings (catalogue no. MOS0024, UPC: 190394012793)
- 2016: Debonaire (catalogue no. MOS0025, UPC: 190394360597)
- 2017: Gold Rush (catalogue no. MOS0027, UPC: 191061556336)
- 2020: Dragons (catalogue no. MOS0030, UPC: 195079384493)

=== Compilations ===
- 2002: Centre Stage – A New Music Compilation (CD, Label: Matchbox Recordings Ltd.)
- 2006: MK89-Hoordosis Vol.1 (Double-CD, Label: Next Music Pty Ltd., catalogue no. NextCD063, UPC: 6009694020626)
- 2018: Millennium Hits 2002–2018 (CD, Label: Mosquito Records London Pty Ltd., catalogue no. MOS0029, UPC: 191924968221)

=== Singles and EPs ===
- 2002: Fall Into The Sun (CD, Maxi), catalogue no. MOS0001, UPC: 5021272063321
- 2002: You Could (CD, Maxi), catalogue no. MOS0002, UPC: 5021272066629
- 2005: Play Me (CD, Maxi), catalogue no. MOS0004
- 2011: Still (CD, Maxi), catalogue no. MOS0016, UPC: 885767253735
- 2014: To Cape Town (CD, Maxi), catalogue no. MOS0019, UPC: 888174675978
- 2014: Forevermore (CD, Maxi), catalogue no. MOS0020, UPC: 888174750316
- 2015: Heroes In Red (CD, Single), catalogue no. MOS0022, UPC: 889211449712
- 2015: Lucky Star Ain't What You Are (CD, Single), catalogue no. MOS0023, UPC: 889211640539
- 2016: On Our Way (CD, Single), catalogue no. MOS0026, UPC: 191061190714
- 2018: Voshaarnooi (CD, Single), catalogue no. MOS0028, UPC: 192914127390
- 2022: Something Stupid (CD, Single), catalogue no. MOS0031, UPC: 198002695949
- 2022: Leningrad (CD, Single), catalogue no. MOS0032, UPC: 198003966178
- 2025: Skulls & Stars (CD, Single), catalogue no. MOS0035, UPC: 199199018467
- 2026: Artcore (CD, Single), catalogue no. MOS0037, UPC: 199900598554

=== Music videos ===
- 2003: Still (filmed in London, UK)
- 2004: Mirrors and Shade (filmed in: London, UK)
- 2005: Play Me (filmed in: Cape Town, SA)
- 2006: I Feel Real (filmed in: Cape Town, SA)
- 2007: All Around The World (filmed in: Kirstenbosch, Cape Town, SA)
- 2008: Peace Dream – Upupha Ngoxolo (filmed in: Hout Bay, SA)
- 2009: Starry Night (filmed in: Hamburg-Bergedorf, Germany)
- 2013: Angie Blue (filmed in Cape Town, SA)
- 2014: See You In The Night (filmed in: Cape Town, SA)
- 2015: Heroes In Red (filmed in: Cape Town, SA)
- 2015: Lucky Star (filmed in: Constantia, SA)
- 2020: Say Your Name (SA)
- 2020: Dangerous Rhymes (SA)

== Literature ==
- Ike Moriz: "The Swinging Real Book: 23 Songs", Mosquito Records London Pty Ltd., 2025, ISBN 979-8467629759
- Eike Moriz: "Dangerous Rhymes : Lyric collection", Mosquito Records London Pty Ltd., 2020, ISBN 978-1-715-47794-3, 2nd edition ISBN 979-8689496825
- Eike Moriz: “Darstellung verschiedener stimmbildnerischer Arbeitsmethoden und deren vergleichende Betrachtung”, Wentorf: Eike Moriz, Germany, 2020, (1st edition, 1999, HfM Carl Maria von Weber), ISBN 978-1-715-40557-1
