= Stefan Karlsson =

Stefan Karlsson may refer to:

- Stefan Karlsson (badminton) (born 1955), Swedish badminton player
- Stefan Karlsson (footballer) (born 1988), Swedish footballer
- Stefan Karlsson (professor) (born 1950), professor of molecular medicine and gene therapy
- Stefan Karlsson (snowboarder) (born 1981), Swedish snowboarder
- Stefan Karlsson, a player for the Sweden national bandy team
- Stefan Karlsson (born Jan. 1964), Retired Swedish Army tank company commander, Director of the Swedish Tank Museum Arsenalen since 2011.
