= Charl du Plessis (pianist) =

South African pianist Charl du Plessis

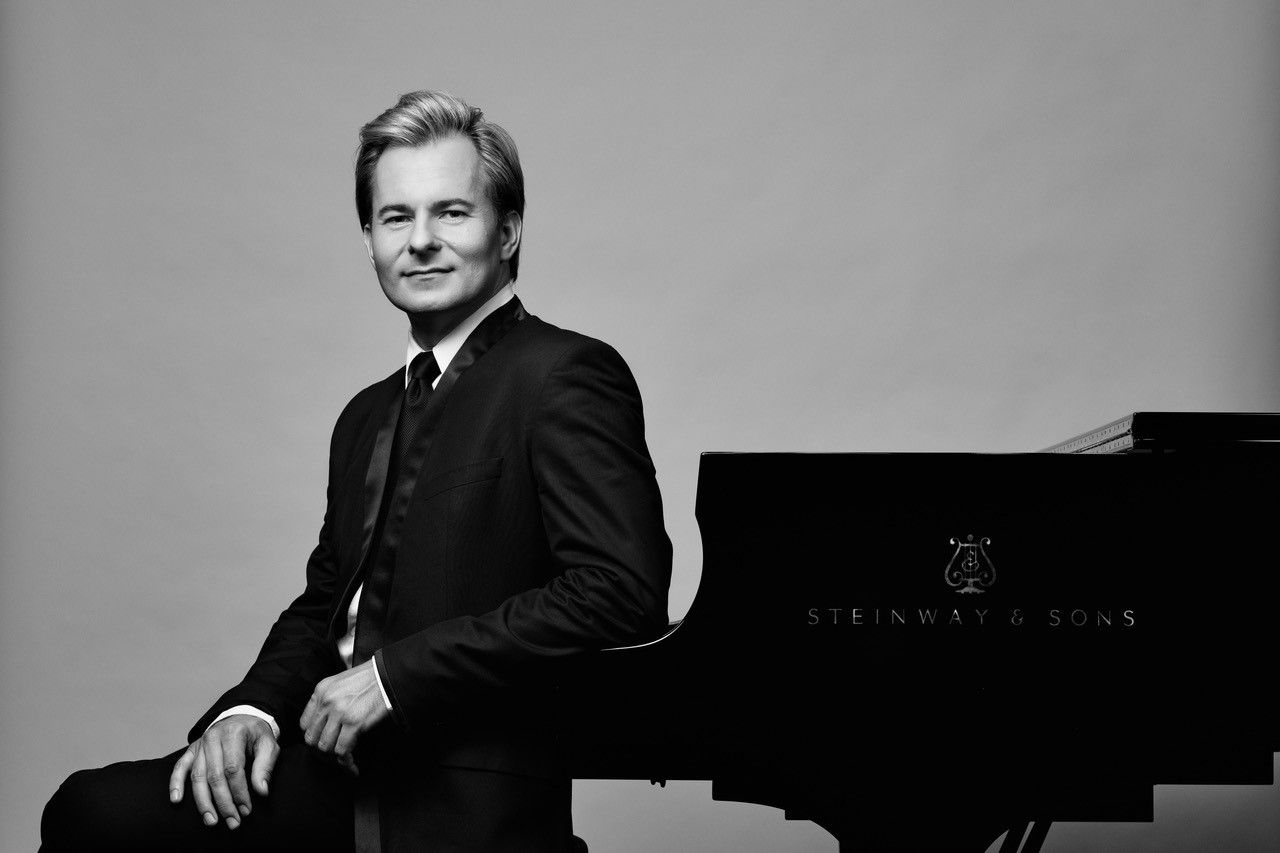

Background information
- Born: February 16, 1977 (age 49); Bloemfontein, South Africa
- Genres: Jazz, Classical
- Occupations: Pianist, Composer, Arranger
- Instrument: Piano

Charl Petrus du Plessis (born 16 February 1977) is a South African classical and jazz pianist. He is one of five South African Steinway artists and has won two South African Music Awards in 2017 and 2018. For the past 20 years he has been the pianist for South African singer-songwriter Nataniël. He is also the founder and pianist of the Charl du Plessis Trio which includes Werner Spies (bass) and Peter Auret (drums).

== Early life ==
Charl Petrus du Plessis was born in Bloemfontein, South Africa, as the youngest child of Charl and Helen du Plessis. He has been a scholar at the boys' school Grey College, Bloemfontein, for his entire school career. As a child born into a nonmusical family, Du Plessis was fascinated by the Steinway & Sons piano in the family's living room which, for all practical purposes, was at first only part of the furnishings. He started with formal piano lessons at the age of nine years and his piano teachers included Annaliza Swart (1986-1991), Francois Rautenbach (1991-1992), Johan Cromhout (1992-1995) and Joseph Stanford (1996-2009).

== Education ==
Du Plessis studied Bachelor of Music at the University of Pretoria after which he completed a master's degree in music at the same university in 2006 with a dissertation titled Die solo-klavierwerke van Charles Camilleri (1931-). He completed his doctorate in music at the University of Pretoria in 2009 with a thesis titled Stilistiese interpretasie van Christopher Norton (1953- ) se Microstyles vir klavier as vertrekpunt vir improvisasie. He is still a part-time classical and jazz piano lecturer at the University of Pretoria. During his studies Du Plessis was the laureate of prizes such as the FAK University of Pretoria Bursary Competition, the Dr Oppel Greeff Bursary Competition, the Pretorium Trust Bursary Competition, the South African Music Scholarship Competition, the acclaimed DJ Roode Bursary Competition and the SAMRO Bursary Competition. Du Plessis also studied with well-known musicians, including György Sebök in Ernen, Switzerland, Dan Hearle and Stefan Karlsson at the University of North Texas, USA and Ulrich Koellah at the Musikhochschule Winterthur in Zürich, Switzerland.

== Career ==
Since 1999 the Charl du Plessis Trio, has recorded three albums with the Swiss classical music record label, Claves Records, annually attends the Festival Musikdorf Ernen in Switzerland. Famous venues Du Plessis has played in include the Royal Albert Hall, the Berliner Philharmonie, the Shangai Oriental Arts Centre and the Elbphilarmonie in Hamburg. In South Africa he has played in the Artscape (Cape Town), the South African State Theatre (Pretoria) and the Sand du Plessis Theatre (Bloemfontein).

Du Plessis frequents arts festivals in South Africa like Aardklop, Klein Karoo Nasionale Kunstefees, Grahamstown Art Festival and the Suidoosterfees. He also tours the globe on a regular basis and has played with various orchestras locally and abroad, including the Florida Symphony Youth Orchestra, the Johannesburg Philharmonic Orchestra and the Cape Town Philharmonic Orchestra. He also accompanied singer and songwriter Ike Moriz during his 2023 tour in Germany.

In an interview with the magazine De Kat, Du Plessis tells how he forged a career as entrepreneur who manages every aspect of his professional career.

== Achievements and awards ==
In 2010 Du Plessis became the youngest pianist in Africa to become a Steinway artist.

In 2017 Du Plessis won a South African Music Award (SAMA) for Baroqueswing Vol. II as Best Classical and Instrumental Album. In 2018 Charl won the same award for Baroqueswing Vol. III in the same category.

On Piano Day 2017, Du Plessis became the first pianist ever to give a concert on top of Table Mountain.

The Charl du Plessis Trio also won a Ghoema Music Award for best Instrumental Album and a Fiesta Award for Best Music Production.

The album Piano Man topped the charts of South African radio station Classic FM for more than seventy consecutive weeks.

During the Aardklop National Arts Festival in 2019 Charl received three awards for his solo show where his first solo album, Freehand, was launched: Best Music-driven Production, Best Performance – Music and the ATKV-Aardklop Award for Innovative Work (debut only).

== Discography ==
- Trio (2008)
- Pianoman (2009)
- Beethoven tango with violinist Zanta Hofmeyr (2011)
- Shanghai brunch (2011)
- Pimp my piano (2013)
- Gershwin songbook (2015)
- Baroqueswing Vol. I (2016) (Claves)
- Baroqueswing Vol. II (2017) (Claves)
- Baroqueswing Vol. III (2018) (Claves)
- Freehand (2019)
- Imagine (2020) (Stenheim)
- It takes three (2021)
