= Reolon =

Reolon is a surname. Notable people with the surname include:

- Jason Reolon (born 1976), South African pianist
- Marcio Reolon (born 1984), Brazilian film director, screenwriter, producer, and actor
- Sergio Reolon (1951–2017), Italian politician
