= Charl du Plessis =

Charl du Plessis may refer to:

- Charl du Plessis (pianist) (born 1977), South African pianist
- Charl du Plessis (rugby union) (born 1987), South African rugby union player
