= Sarie Marais =

South African folk song

The 1931 rendition of Sarie Marais by Chris Blignaut^{(af)} & The Melodians, sung in Afrikaans.

"Sarie Marais" (also known as "My Sarie Marais", pronounced [ˈməi ˈsɑːri maˈrɛ]) is a traditional South African folk song, created possibly during the First Anglo-Boer War (c. 1880) or (more likely) the Second Anglo-Boer War (ca. 1900). The tune was possibly taken from a song dating back from the American Civil War called "Carry me back to Tennessee" or "Sweet Ellie Rhee" with the words roughly translated into Afrikaans.

In the English translation, the song begins: "My Sarie Marais is so far from my heart but I hope to see her again. She lived near the Mooi River before this war began..."; and the chorus is: "Oh, take me back to the old Transvaal, there where my Sarie lives, down there among the maize fields near the green thorn tree, there lives my Sarie Marais." It continues about the fear of being removed far, "over the sea" (in fact, of the 28,000 Boer men taken prisoner by the ruling British authorities, over 25,000 were transported overseas).

As well as becoming very well known in South Africa, the song was taken up by various people, organizations and singers in other countries.

== Origins of the song ==
The origins of the song are unclear. One version of the story refers to the American folk song Ellie Rhee, written in 1865 by Septimus Winner (1827–1902) and included in a book entitled "The Cavendish Song Album". The other version of origins the song refers to Polish socialist song Gdy Naród do Boju(pl.wiki) (alternative title - Szlachta 1831), written in 1835 by Gustaw Ehrenberg. Music for this song was composed by Fryderyk Chopin in 1848.

An account on the National Anthems forum supports J.P. Toerien as author and his wife Sarie Maré as the subject of the song. It too suggests the song's origins go back to Sweet Ellie Rhee. The claim is that this song was sung by Americans working in the Transvaal gold mines, and heard there by Afrikaans journalist and poet Jacobus Petrus Toerien, who re-wrote the song in Afrikaans, replacing the name of Ellie Rhee with that of his own beloved Sarie Maré (Susara Margaretha Maré).

Another account is that the song dates from the First Anglo-Boer War (1880–1881). When Ella de Wet, wife of General Louis Botha's military attaché Nicolaas Jacobus de Wet came to the battle front to see her husband she often played on the piano while the nearby burghers sang songs from the Cavendish album. The burghers supposedly wanted to honour their field chaplain Dominee Paul Nel, who often told stories around the campfires about his childhood and his beautiful mother Sarie Maré, who died young.

Whatever its origins, the song changed and got more verses as time went on. This accounts for the reference to the Kakies (af) (or khakis), as the Boers called the British soldiers during the Second Anglo-Boer War. They were known as Rooibaadjies ("red coats") during the First Anglo-Boer War.

== Later spread and influence of the song ==
The song quickly spread due to soldiers coming back from the South African Boer War. The melody was adopted in 1953 as the official march of the United Kingdom's Commandos and is played after the Regimental March on ceremonial occasions. The French École militaire interarmes also sings the song in its French translation. The song has been sung by Jim Reeves and Kenneth McKellar in Afrikaans.

Sarie, Volksblad's sister magazine, was also named for her. Many hotels and apartment complexes are named after her. During the first international broadcast between South Africa, Britain, and America during the birthday of Mrs. Isie Smuts, the wife of the prime minister, General Jan Smuts, Sarie Marais was sung by Gracie Fields.

During the Second World War, there was a unit of soldiers called "Sarie Marais calling". The South African army, as well as the French foreign legion, play this march during parades.

It is also the official song of the Girl Guides of Sri Lanka ( Ceylon ) who heard the Boerekrygsgevangenes (af – Boer prisoners of war) performing it during the beginning of the 20th century. During the 1930s, it was incorrectly played as South Africa's official national anthem. Germans cultivated a pink rose called Sarie Maries, which is planted in the School of Armour in Tempe, Bloemfontein.

== Films ==
=== Sarie Marais (1931): the first South African film with sound ===
Sarie Marais was also the title of the first South African talking picture, directed by Joseph Albrecht (af) and made in 1931. Filmed in Johannesburg, Sarie Marais manages to pack a lot into its 10-minute running time. Set in a British POW camp, the film concentrates on a group of Boer prisoners as they pass the time under the watchful eye of their British guards. One of the internees, played by Billy Mathews, lifts his voice in song with the popular Afrikaans patriotic tune "My Sarie Marais". His enthusiasm catches on with the other prisoners of war, giving them hope for the future.

Shortly after this film's release, a group of Afrikaner nationalists established a film production organisation called the Reddingsdaad-Bond-Amateur-Rolprent Organisasie (Rescue Action League Amateur Film Organisation), which rallied against British and American films pervading the country.

Francis Coley directed a remake of this film, again titled Sarie Marais in 1949 (af).

=== Sarie women's magazine ===
The contemporary Afrikaans women's magazine Sarie takes its name from this song. Originally entitled Sarie Marais – a name which at the time (1949) of its first publication was synonymous with the idea of empowered Afrikaans womanhood – it was the first Afrikaans magazine to focus on the female market, with a content ranging from fashion, decor, and beauty to relationship advice and family planning.

== The actual Sarie Marais ==
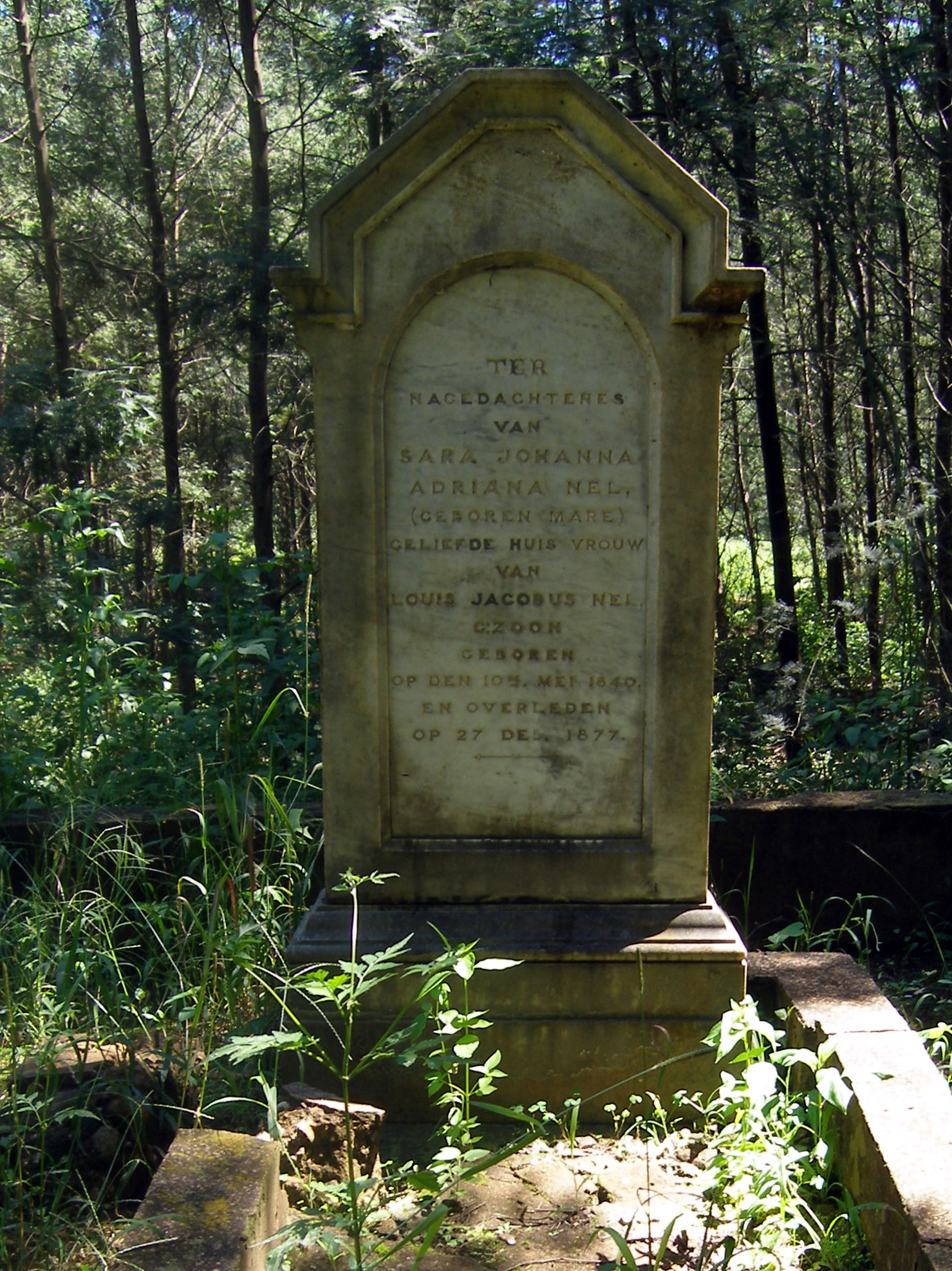
Grave of Sara Johanna Adriana Maré.

It is not clear if Sarie Marais was a real person or fictitious. Two persons have been mentioned as being the real Sarie Marais: Sarie Maré (full name Susara Johanna Adriana Maré) (1840–1877) and Sarie Maré (full name Susara Margaretha Maré) (1869–1939).

=== Susara Johanna Adriana Maré ===
Susara Johanna Adriana Maré was born in Uitenhage, Cape Province on 10 May 1840 as the daughter of Johannes Albertus Gerhardus Maré (also spelt Maree) and Susara Johanna Adriana Kok. She married Louis Jacobus Nel in 1857 in Pietermaritzburg. Maré died at the age of 37 after giving birth to her 11th child, and was buried near the old homestead on their farm Welgegund, near Greytown, KwaZulu-Natal.

As noted above, one of her sons was field chaplain Dominee (Pastor) Paul Nel, who served in the First Anglo-Boer War and supposedly often told stories around the campfires about his childhood and his beautiful mother Sarie Maré, who died young.

=== Susara Margaretha Maré ===
Susara Margaretha Maré (1869–1939), eldest daughter of Jacob Philippus Maré and Cornelia Susanna Jacoba Erasmus, was born on 15 April 1869 at Eendraght (translated to Unity) Farm, in Suikerbosrand, Transvaal. In later life she was also nicknamed Tant Mossie (auntie Mossie).

Her parents were Voortrekkers who established themselves in the Suikerbosrand area. Her father Jacob Maré became highly regarded in the Transvaal, and a street in Pretoria is named for him.

At the time when Susara Margaretha's parents settled in the area, the town of Heidelberg still did not exist. The greatest concentration of voortrekkers could be found near the Mooirivier, where Potchefstroom stands today. Suikerbosrand was at that time in the Mooirivier Ward.

When she was 16 years old, she met Jacobus Petrus Toerien – journalist (and later a well-known poet) who wrote under the pseudonym of Jepete in "Ons Kleintje" and was editor of "Di Patriot". As a representative of the Patriots of Paarl, he was in Pretoria to conduct a meeting with her father.

They were married and had sixteen children, of whom only eight survived.

One common version of the song's origin attributes its authorship to Toerien, who heard the song Sweet Ellie Rhee from American workers in the Transvaal gold mines. In the time between the First War of Independence and the second one – as the wars with the British were considered – Toerien re-wrote the song in Afrikaans, substituting for the name of Ellie Rhee that of his own beloved wife Sarie Maré. The words still did not exactly match the ones we know today. Maré later became Marais due to a misspelling.

In 1899 Sarie was hit by a bullet. She was not hit by the English soldiers, but by others.

Sarie was a very religious woman, and in later years tried her best to disassociate herself from the song.

When Jacobus died in 1920, she moved her daughters to Bloemfontein where she lived the rest of her life. She died there on 22 December 1939, at the age of 73.

She is buried in an unmarked grave in the Memoriam-begraafplaas (memorium burying place) by the Vrouemonument (woman's monument).

== "Sweet Ellie Rhee" lyrics ==
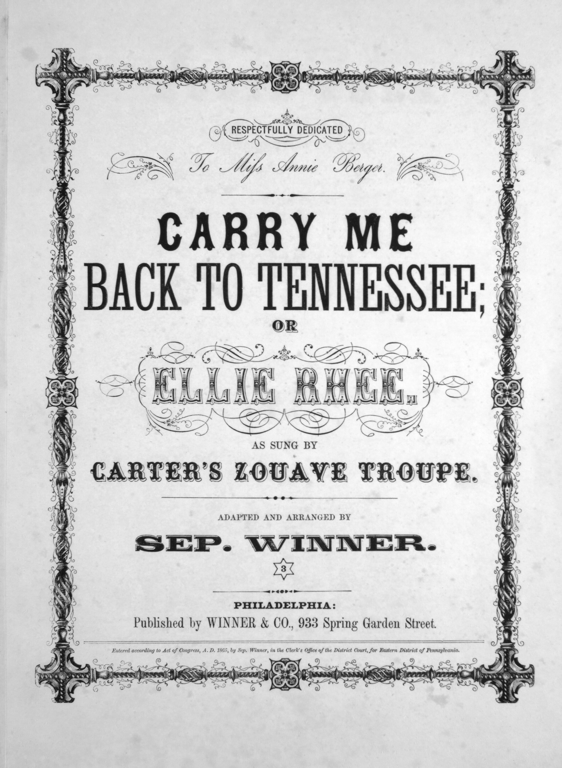

The American folk song, "Ellie Rhee", (or "Carry me back to Tennessee" written in 1865 by Septimus Winner (1827–1902), is widely considered to have influenced the South African song.

Sweet Ellie Rhee, so dear to me
Is lost forever more
Our home was down in Tennessee
Before this cruel war
Then carry me back to Tennessee
Back where I long to be
Amid the fields of yellow corn
To my darling Ellie Rhee

== Afrikaans lyrics ==
Originally in the Afrikaans version it was Sarie Maré which then became Marais.

=== Original Dutch version (ca 1880) ===
Dutch:
Mijn lieve Sarah Marais is ver weg van mij,
maar ik hoop om haar weer te zien.
Ik ontmoette haar voor het uitbreken van de oorlog
in de wyk van Mooi Rivier .

Chorus:

O, lang ik om terug te gaan naar de Zuid-Afrikaansche Republiek,
waar mijn lieve Sarie woont.
Daar, tussen het mais en het groene doorn boom,
daar woont mijn lieve Sarie Marais.

Translation:
My dear Sarah Marais is far away from me,
But I hope to see her again.
I met her before the outbreak of war
In the Mooi River county.

Chorus:

Oh, I long to go back to the South African Republic,
where my dear Sarie lives.
There, among the corn and the green thorn tree,
there lives my dear Sarah Marais.

=== Another version in Afrikaans ===
Afrikaans:
My Sarie Marais is so ver van my af
Maar ek hoop om haar weer te sien;
Sy het in die wyk van die Mooirivier gewoon
Nog voor die oorlog het begin.

Chorus:

O bring my terug na die ou Transvaal
Daar waar my Sarie woon:
Daar onder in die mielies by die groen doringboom,
Daar woon my Sarie Marais!

Ek was so bang dat die Kakies my sou vang
En ver oor die see wegstuur,
Toe vlug ek na die kant van die Upington se sand,
Daar onder by die Grootrivier.

Chorus

O bring my terug na die ou Transvaal
Daar war my Sarie woon;
Daar onder in die mielies by die groen doringboom
Daar woon my Sarie Marais!

Translation:
My Sarie Marais is so far from me,
But I hope to see her again
She lived in the neighbourhood of the Mooi River
Even before the war began.

Chorus:

Oh bring me back to the old Transvaal
There where my Sarie lives;
Down there in the corn by the green thorn-tree:
There lives my Sarie Marais!

I was so scared that the Khakis would catch me
And send me far across the sea.
That I fled to the side of the Upington's sand
Down there by the Great River.

Chorus:

Oh bring me back to the old Transvaal
There where my Sarie lives,
Down by the corn at the green thorn tree
There lives my Sarie Marais!

Afrikaans:
My Sarie Marais is so ver van my hart,
Maar ek hoop om haar weer te sien.
Sy het in die wyk van die Mooirivier gewoon,
Nog voor die oorlog het begin.

Chorus:

O bring my terug na die ou Transvaal,
Daar waar my Sarie woon.
Daar onder in die mielies, by die groen doringboom,
Daar woon my Sarie Marais,
Daar onder in die mielies by die groen doringboom
Daar woon my Sarie Marais.

Ek was so bang, dat die Kakies my sou vang
En ver oor die see wegstuur;
Toe vlug ek na die kant van die Upington se sand
Onder langs die groot Rivier.

Chorus

Die Kakies is mos net soos 'n krokodil, 'n pes,
Hulle sleep jou altyd water toe;
Hul gooi jou op 'n skip vir 'n lange, lange trip,
Die josie weet waarnatoe.

Chorus

Verlossing het gekom en huis toe gaan was daar,
Terug na die ou Transvaal;
My lieflingspersoon sal seker ook daar wees
Om my met 'n soen te beloon.

Chorus

=== Poetic English lyrics by Josef Marais (1939) ===
My Sarie Marais is so far from my heart
And I'm longing to see her again
She lived on a farm on the Mooi river's bank
Before I left on this campaign.

Chorus:

Oh bring me back to the old Transvaal
That's where I long to be
Way yonder 'mongst the mealie
By the green thorny tree
Sarie is waiting for me
I wonder if I'll ever
See that green thorny tree
There where she's waiting for me

I feared that the soldiers would get hold of me
They would send me away over sea
I fled over land to the Orange river sand
In Upington I would be free

Chorus

At last there was peace and I started for home
To the Transvaal I've always adored
My Sarie Marais will be waiting there for me
Her kiss will be my best reward

Chorus

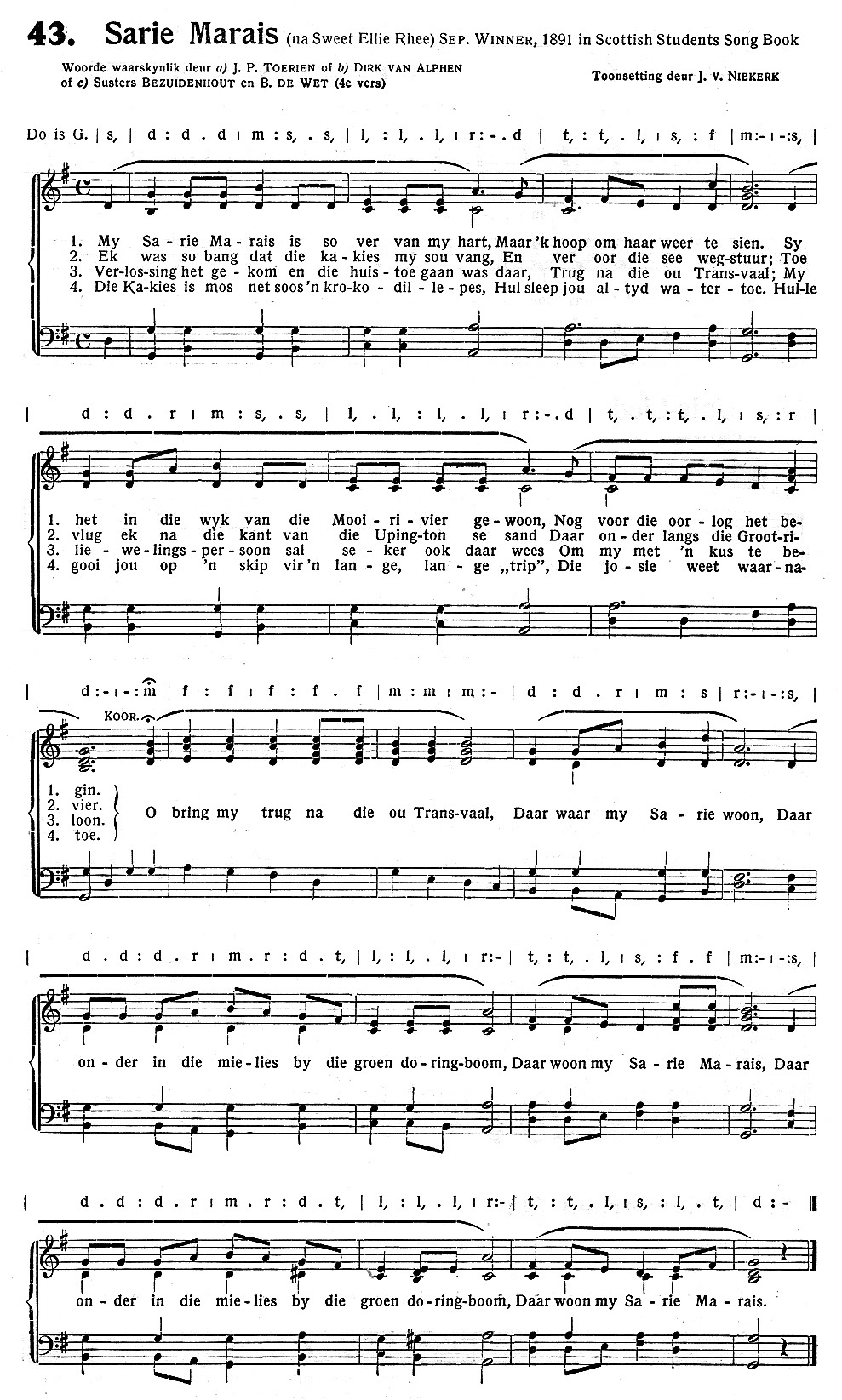
Sheet music of Sarie Marais (Afrikaans version), from the FAK folk song collection for South Africa.
