= Sarie =

- Editor: Michelle van Breda
- Categories: Women's magazine
- Format: Monthly
- Founder: 1949; 77 years ago
- Company: news24
- Country: South Africa
- Based in: Cape Town
- Language: Afrikaans
- Website: www.media24.com/magazines/sarie/

Sarie is a South African women's magazine, written in Afrikaans. It is published by Media24, and is their oldest publication for women, first published in 1949 under the title Sarie Marais.

Based in Cape Town, it is the most popular publication of its type in South Africa. The magazine is published on a monthly basis.

The editor of Sarie is Michelle van Breda. South African writer, singer and TV personality Nataniël has been writing the Kaalkop column of the magazine since 2002. In 2013 both the magazine and Michelle van Breda won the MPASA PICA Awards.
