= Nataniël =

South African entertainer

Nataniël le Roux
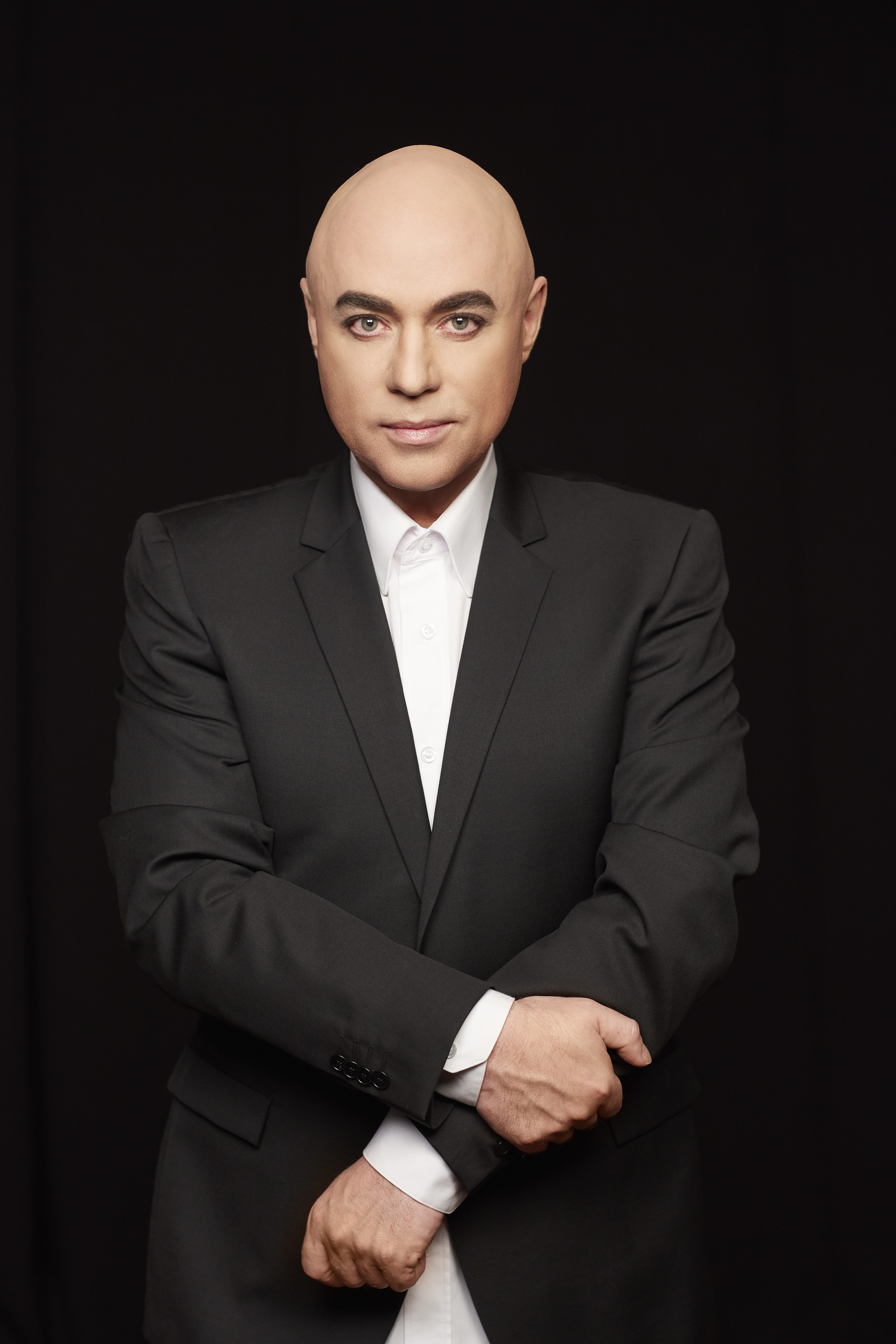
- Born: 30 August 1962 (age 63); Grahamstown
- Occupations: Singer, writer, entertainer, composer
- Television: Die Nataniël Tafel, Edik van Nantes
- Website: http://www.nataniel.co.za

Nataniël le Roux (born 30 August 1962), better known as Nataniël, is a South African singer, songwriter, entertainer and best-selling author. He is best known for his solo stage act and his lifestyle and cooking TV shows.

== Career ==
Nataniël le Roux launched his career in 1989 with the release of his first single, Maybe Time. Since then he has released fifteen studio and two live albums, staged more than eighty original theatre productions and published twenty-one books. In 1997 he also released a four-track EP entitled The Diva Divine with opera singer Mimi Coertse. His many theatre shows, often staged at the Johannesburg casino Emperor's Palace, have won him multiple awards.

Nataniël manages a company specialising in lifestyle goods called Kaalkop, which means "bald" in Afrikaans, but implies "honest" or "unpretentious".

After starring in the TV series Another Life With Nataniël (1998–1999) and Project Fame (2004), Nataniël created and hosted Die Nataniël Tafel, a cooking and entertainment program in five seasons (2012–2014), on the South African television channel kykNET. In 2014 he starred in the South African TV drama Almon, Henry which he also wrote. In recent years he has created and hosted five seasons of his TV show Edik van Nantes (2015–2020) on the same channel alongside his brother, Erik le Roux.

During live musical performances, he is often accompanied on stage by Steinway pianist Charl du Plessis, or the Charl du Plessis Trio.

Nataniël has been a column writer for Sarie magazine since 2002, and has recently published the first part of his memoirs.

== Discography ==
=== Studio albums ===
- 2017: One Day in a Castle
- 2010: Oh!
- 2007: I Wear White
- 2006: Fashion
- 2003: Will He Weep
- 2002: Dance ’til I Break
- 2000: Fall
- 1998: Slow Tear
- 1997: Portfolio
- 1995: The Wallflower
- 1995: The Cover Concert
- 1994: Dying for Master
- 1993: Recital
- 1989: Work of Art
- 1988: Weird People

=== Live albums ===
- 2014: Moodswing (Nataniël on Stage)
- 2013: Factory (live at Emperors Palace)

=== Compilation albums ===
- 2009: Act Two
- 2006: Act One

=== Singles and EPs ===
- 1987: Maybe Time (Single)
- 1988: One Life (Single)
- 1997: The Diva Divine, with Mimi Coertse (EP)
- 1998: Gossip Tower (Single)
- 1999: In Ev’ry Star (Single)
- 2003: Santa Maria (Single)
- 2004: Gold (Single)
- 2005: Diamond (Single)
- 2019: 100 Years (Single)

=== Music videos ===
- 1988: Weird people
- One life
- Dis te laat
- Spook
- Roses and Jazz
- Bat
- Maybe we still believe
- Juice
- Moon Jazz
- Now I can die
- Slow tear
- None of Them
- Say Your Name
- In Ev’ry Star
- Hopeless Hand
- Gold
- Diamond
- 2005: Fashion
- 2019: 100 Years

== Literature ==
=== Memoirs ===
- 2019: Look at Me ISBN 978-0-7981-7996-6
- 2019: Kyk Na My ISBN 978-0-7981-7993-5

=== Story books ===
- 2020: Dik Dun Thick Thin ISBN 978-0-7981-8141-9
- 2017: Closet ISBN 978-0-7981-7437-4
- 2016: Zip! ISBN 978-0-7981-7424-4
- 2014: 150 Stories ISBN 978-0-7981-6664-5
- 2012: Kaalkop 3 ISBN 978-0-7981-5686-8
- 2010: Nicky And Lou ISBN 978-0-7981-5572-4
- 2008: When I Was ISBN 978-0-7981-5002-6
- 2008: Kaalkop 2 ISBN 978-0-7981-4923-5
- 2005: Kaalkop Journal ISBN 978-0-7981-4711-8
- 2004: Kaalkop ISBN 978-0-7981-4436-0
- 2001: Tuesday ISBN 978-0-7981-4189-5
- 1999: Maria Maria ISBN 978-0-7981-3997-7
- 1996; Rubber ISBN 978-0-7981-3539-9
- 1993: Oopmond
- 1992: Dancing with John
- 1990: Excuse Me ISBN 978-1-8681-9379-0

=== Cookbooks ===
- 2018: Die Edik van Nantes Kookboek, by Nataniël and Erik le Roux, ISBN 978-0-7981-7732-0
- 2015: Die Huis van Rye ISBN 978-0-7981-5804-6
- 2009: Gatherings ISBN 978-0-7981-5114-6
- 2001: Food from the White House ISBN 978-0-7981-4273-1
- 1996: Die Nataniël Kombuis
- 1994: Nataniël Kook
