= Kesivan Naidoo =

South African jazz drummer, composer and bandleader

- Born: 25 June 1979 (age 47); East London, Eastern Cape, South Africa
- Genres: Jazz, South African jazz, world music, electronica
- Occupations: Drummer, composer, bandleader, musical director
- Instruments: Drums, percussion
- Years active: 1993–present
- Website: kesivan.net

Kesivan Naidoo (born 25 June 1979) is a South African jazz drummer, composer, bandleader and musical director based in Basel, Switzerland.

Naidoo is the founder and leader of Kesivan and the Lights, his principal ensemble and the main vehicle for his original compositions, arrangements of jazz standards and jazz interpretations of popular music. The band has released three albums: Instigators of the Revolution (2010), Brotherhood (2014) and We Dance at Home (2026).

He also leads two distinct large-ensemble projects. The Kesivan Big Band Experience presents big-band orchestrations of his original compositions, while the Kesivan amaBigBand Experience arranges amapiano and contemporary popular music for a large jazz ensemble. In 2023, Naidoo led an amapiano big band for the Hunter's Refresh Experience featuring Boohle and Ch'cco. Contemporary coverage described the project as an industry first for the amapiano genre.

Naidoo received the Standard Bank Young Artist Award for Jazz in 2009 and has been described as the only drummer to have received the award.

In 2014, Naidoo led Kesivan and the Lights in the band's New York debut at Carnegie Hall as part of the UBUNTU: Music and Arts of South Africa festival.

He has performed or recorded with musicians including Miriam Makeba, Bheki Mseleku, Zim Ngqawana, Winston Mankunku Ngozi, Feya Faku, Abdullah Ibrahim, Louis Moholo-Moholo, Maria Schneider, John Patitucci, Danilo Pérez, Joe Lovano and William Parker.

== Early life ==
Naidoo was born in East London, in South Africa's Eastern Cape. He was raised by his mother, Vinodarie Naidoo.

He became interested in drumming as a child and began playing drums at approximately the age of eleven. In 1993, aged fourteen, he made his professional stage debut at the Hogsback Arts Festival with a group led by musician and educator Alan Webster.

During his teenage years, Naidoo performed with the Hudson Park Jazz Band and Hudson Concert Band and took lessons with South African jazz drummer Lulu Gontsana. He was also selected for South African national youth jazz ensembles.

In 1996, Naidoo began performing with pianist Hotep Idris Galeta. Galeta became an important early mentor, encouraged Naidoo to study at the South African College of Music at the University of Cape Town, and helped introduce him to Cape Town's professional jazz community.

== Education and scholarships ==
In 1997, Naidoo enrolled at the South African College of Music at the University of Cape Town, where he studied jazz performance and composition. He studied drums with South African drummer and educator Kevin Gibson, who was the university's drum instructor during Naidoo's time there.

Naidoo graduated from the University of Cape Town with a Bachelor of Music with Honours.

While studying at the university, he won the 1999 Southern African Music Rights Organisation Overseas Scholarship Competition. Contemporary profiles described him as the youngest person to win the competition.

The scholarship enabled Naidoo to spend a year in India studying Indian classical music under sitarist and educator Sanjoy Bandopadhyay at Rabindra Bharati University in Kolkata.

In 2015, Naidoo joined the inaugural class of the Master of Music in Contemporary Performance programme at Berklee College of Music, with a concentration in global jazz. The programme was conducted through the Berklee Global Jazz Institute under the artistic direction of pianist Danilo Pérez.

At the Berklee Global Jazz Institute, Naidoo studied under and was mentored by Pérez, John Patitucci, Joe Lovano and Terri Lyne Carrington.

Naidoo also received instruction from American jazz drummer Brian Blade during his time at the Global Jazz Institute. Berklee has listed Blade among the renowned artists who served as artists-in-residence with the institute.

His postgraduate studies were supported in part by an Oppenheimer Memorial Trust Scholarship.

Naidoo completed the Master of Music degree cum laude in 2016. His culminating project, Eclipse: Of Myth, Music and Finding the Way Back Home, combined original composition and improvisation with the concept of a graphic novel.

Naidoo also worked and performed with American composer, arranger and bandleader Maria Schneider. Schneider's approach to composition and orchestration became an important influence on Naidoo's writing, particularly his development of music for large ensembles and his understanding of how orchestration can expand the emotional and narrative character of a composition.

== Career ==
=== Early professional work ===
During the late 1990s and 2000s, Naidoo performed with a number of South African jazz and cross-genre groups, including Tribe, Babu and Closet Snare.

Tribe was formed with saxophonist Buddy Wells, pianist Mark Fransman and bassist Charles Lazar. The group performed at the North Sea Jazz Festival in The Hague and released the albums Our Language and A Moment in Cape Town.

Naidoo also performed and recorded with South African musicians including Miriam Makeba, Bheki Mseleku, Zim Ngqawana, Feya Faku, Hotep Galeta, Winston Mankunku Ngozi, Jimmy Dludlu, Herbie Tsoaeli, Steve Newman and Tony Cox.

He played drums and percussion on Makeba's 2004 album Reflections and appeared on recordings by a range of South African and international jazz musicians.

=== Mentorship by Bheki Mseleku ===
South African pianist and composer Bheki Mseleku was one of Naidoo's most important musical mentors. Naidoo had followed Mseleku's music since his mid-teens and began performing with him at the age of nineteen, after Mseleku contacted him to play a series of concerts in Johannesburg.

Naidoo subsequently performed with Mseleku and developed a close musical and personal relationship with him. Their early rehearsals included an intensive series of all-night sessions centred on music, improvisation, philosophy and spirituality.

Mseleku deepened Naidoo's engagement with the music of John Coltrane and influenced his understanding of African rhythmic language, South African musical identity, dance, spirituality and modern jazz improvisation.

Mseleku's influence remained central to Naidoo's later work as a composer and bandleader. Kesivan and the Lights has continued to perform and arrange Mseleku's compositions, including Angola, as part of Naidoo's engagement with the legacies of South African jazz composers.

=== Kesivan and the Lights ===
Kesivan and the Lights is Naidoo's principal ensemble and the central vehicle for his work as a composer, arranger and bandleader. Naidoo established the group to perform his original compositions, arrangements of jazz standards and jazz interpretations of popular music.

The band's personnel have changed between recordings and performances, with Naidoo remaining its leader, drummer, composer and arranger.

The ensemble first performed at the Standard Bank Jazz Festival in Grahamstown in 2009. Its initial formation brought together South African and European musicians, including trumpeter Feya Faku, guitarist Reza Khota, pianist and multi-instrumentalist Mark Fransman, saxophonists Johan Hörlén and Karl-Martin Almqvist, trombonist Adrian Mears and bassist Martin Sjöstedt.

Kesivan and the Lights has released three albums:

1. Instigators of the Revolution (2010)

2. Brotherhood (2014)

3. We Dance at Home (2026)

==== Instigators of the Revolution ====
The band's debut album, Instigators of the Revolution, was released in 2010. Recorded in Sweden, the album included Naidoo's original compositions and arrangements honouring musicians who had influenced him, including Hotep Galeta, Winston Mankunku Ngozi and Bheki Mseleku.

The album was nominated for a South African Music Award.

==== Brotherhood and Carnegie Hall ====
Kesivan and the Lights released their second album, Brotherhood, in 2014. The recording featured Naidoo as bandleader, drummer and composer, with musicians including Feya Faku, guitarist Reza Khota, pianist Kyle Shepherd, saxophonist Justin Bellairs and bassist Shane Cooper.

On 30 October 2014, Naidoo led Kesivan and the Lights at Carnegie Hall as part of Carnegie Hall's citywide UBUNTU: Music and Arts of South Africa festival. The performance marked the New York debut of Naidoo's band.

Carnegie Hall's official programme identified Naidoo as the leader, composer and drummer of Kesivan and the Lights. The performing group consisted of Naidoo, Justin Bellairs, Kyle Shepherd, Reza Khota and Shane Cooper.

The Carnegie Hall performance served as the international launch of Brotherhood and received a standing ovation.

The group also performed a Carnegie Hall Neighborhood Concert at Flushing Town Hall in Queens on 1 November 2014.

==== We Dance at Home ====
Naidoo later reassembled Kesivan and the Lights with an international line-up including pianist Bokani Dyer, trumpeter Darren English, saxophonist Charley Rose, guitarist Fabio Gouvêa and bassist Joan Codina.

In 2025, the group performed and recorded at the Baxter Theatre in Cape Town.

The band's third album, We Dance at Home, was released in 2026. It was the first Kesivan and the Lights album since Brotherhood and combined Naidoo's original compositions with jazz arrangements and reinterpretations of South African, standard and popular music.

=== Film composition ===
Naidoo composed the original score for the South African feature film Visa/Vie, directed by Elan Gamaker.

The score received the 2011 South African Film and Television Award for Best Music Composition in a Feature Film.

=== Beat Bag Bohemia and documentary work ===
Naidoo was a member of Swiss drummer Lucas Niggli's percussion ensemble Beat Bag Bohemia, alongside Niggli, Rolando Lamussene and Peter Conradin Zumthor. The quartet's self-titled album was released by Intakt Records in 2008.

The quartet's tours through Africa and Europe were documented in Martin Fuchs's film The Fellowship of the Drums, released on DVD by Intakt Records in 2011.

=== Skyjack and other collaborations ===
Naidoo became a member of the multinational jazz ensemble Skyjack, alongside South African musicians Kyle Shepherd and Shane Cooper and Swiss musicians Marc Stucki and Andreas Tschopp.

The group developed after its members performed together in South Africa in 2013. Its self-titled debut album was recorded in Switzerland and released in 2016. A second album, The Hunter, followed in 2019.

Naidoo's international recording and performance work has also included collaborations with Maria Schneider, Carlo Mombelli, Mike del Ferro, Karl-Martin Almqvist, Martin Sjöstedt, Lucas Niggli and William Parker.

=== Life and work in Switzerland ===
Naidoo moved to Basel, Switzerland, in 2018 and resides there.

From Basel, he has continued to work across South Africa, Switzerland and the wider European jazz scene.

His work in Europe has included performances and collaborations with South African, Swiss and international musicians and the development of his two large-ensemble projects.

=== Kesivan Big Band Experience ===
Naidoo leads the Kesivan Big Band Experience, a large jazz ensemble devoted to big-band orchestrations of his original compositions.

In 2022, Naidoo and trombonist, conductor and arranger Adrian Mears began developing large-ensemble versions of compositions Naidoo had written during the preceding two decades.

The project brought together musicians from South Africa, Switzerland and Germany. Its repertoire included orchestrations of compositions from Instigators of the Revolution, Brotherhood and Naidoo's other projects.

The ensemble toured South Africa in 2023, performing at the National Arts Festival in Makhanda, in Cape Town and at the Market Theatre in Johannesburg.

Naidoo's experiences working with Maria Schneider influenced his approach to writing and orchestration for the project, particularly his use of instrumental colour, layered ensemble textures and longer narrative structures.

=== Kesivan amaBigBand Experience ===
Naidoo also founded and leads the Kesivan amaBigBand Experience, a separate large-ensemble project devoted to jazz-orchestra arrangements of amapiano, popular music, hip-hop and contemporary African music.

The project originated in 2023, when Naidoo was commissioned to assemble and lead an amapiano big band for the Hunter's Refresh Experience. The concerts featured amapiano artists Boohle and Ch'cco with a large ensemble of South African jazz musicians.

The project was announced as a 20-piece amapiano big band and was described in contemporary coverage as an industry first for the genre. Subsequent reporting described the performing group as a 24-piece ensemble. Boohle said that she was unaware of an amapiano big band having previously been presented in that form.

Rather than reproducing amapiano through its usual electronic production, Naidoo arranged the music for acoustic and electric rhythm sections, brass, woodwinds, percussion and vocalists. The arrangements translated the genre's electronic textures, grooves and log-drum patterns into parts for a large jazz ensemble.

Naidoo subsequently developed the concept into the Kesivan amaBigBand Experience, distinct from the Kesivan Big Band Experience, which is devoted to orchestrations of his original jazz compositions.

In March 2026, the Kesivan amaBigBand Experience appeared on the main-stage programme at the inaugural Montreux Jazz Festival Franschhoek. The 26-piece ensemble featured Boohle, Moonchild Sanelly and BONJ and presented large-scale arrangements of amapiano and contemporary South African popular music.

Kesivan and the Lights also appeared separately at the festival with a different repertoire and smaller ensemble.

== Musical style and influences ==
Naidoo's work is grounded in jazz and South African improvised music while incorporating influences from Indian classical music, funk, soul, electronic music and contemporary African popular music.

His compositions and arrangements have drawn on the music and mentorship of South African musicians including Hotep Galeta, Bheki Mseleku, Winston Mankunku Ngozi, Miriam Makeba, Feya Faku and Zim Ngqawana.

His drumming influences include Elvin Jones, Max Roach, Tony Williams and drummers associated with James Brown. Among contemporary jazz drummers, Naidoo has identified Brian Blade and Jeff "Tain" Watts as his two principal influences.

Naidoo's broader compositional influences include John Coltrane, Miles Davis, Wayne Shorter, Indian classical music and African-American funk and soul traditions. His work with Maria Schneider also influenced his approach to composition and large-ensemble orchestration.

His projects range from the original compositions and jazz arrangements of Kesivan and the Lights to the large-scale orchestration of his compositions through the Kesivan Big Band Experience and the orchestral reinterpretation of amapiano and popular music through the Kesivan amaBigBand Experience.

== Endorsements and equipment ==
Naidoo is a Zildjian Artist and has a longstanding endorsement relationship with the cymbal manufacturer.

Zildjian produced a custom 24-inch prototype ride cymbal for Naidoo based on his own design specifications. The cymbal was made specifically for him and bears his name and the individual inscription "BE Kesivan 001".

In March 2025, Naidoo became an endorsed artist with Vic Firth, entering into an artist endorsement agreement with the drumstick manufacturer.

== Awards and honours ==
- 1999 – SAMRO Overseas Scholarship Competition; reported as the youngest person to win the competition
- 2002 – University of Cape Town Honours Council Scholarship
- 2009 – Standard Bank Young Artist Award for Jazz
- 2011 – South African Film and Television Award for Best Music Composition in a Feature Film, for Visa/Vie
- Oppenheimer Memorial Trust Scholarship for postgraduate study at Berklee College of Music
- 2016 – Master of Music, cum laude, Berklee College of Music

== Selected discography ==
=== As leader: Kesivan and the Lights ===
- Instigators of the Revolution (2010)
- Brotherhood (2014)
- We Dance at Home (2026)

=== With collaborative groups ===
- Tribe – Our Language (2003)
- Tribe – A Moment in Cape Town (2002)
- Babu – Uproots (2008)
- Lucas Niggli Drum Quartet – Beat Bag Bohemia (2008)
- Closet Snare – Live at the Independent Armchair Theatre (2010)
- Skyjack – Skyjack (2016)
- Skyjack – The Hunter (2019)

=== Selected appearances ===
- Jimmy Dludlu – Afrocentric (2002)
- Tony Cox and Steve Newman with guests – World in a Guitar: Live at the Market Theatre (2002)
- Feya Faku – Tacet (2003)
- Zim Ngqawana – Vadzimu (2003)
- Miriam Makeba – Reflections (2004)
- Bokani Dyer – Mirrors (2010)
- Herbie Tsoaeli – African Time (2012)
- Karl-Martin Almqvist and Martin Sjöstedt – Good to Be (2012)
- The Mike Rossi Project – Trespassing Permitted (2012)
- Shane Cooper – Oscillations (2013)
- Feya Faku and the Spirit Jazz Orchestra – Live at the SABC (2014)
- Mike del Ferro – The Johannesburg Sessions (2015)
- Carlo Mombelli – I Press My Spine to the Ground (2016)
- William Parker – Flower in a Stained-Glass Window & the Blinking of the Ear (2018)

== Filmography ==
- Visa/Vie – composer
- The Fellowship of the Drums – documentary subject and performer
