= Jason Reolon =

South African pianist

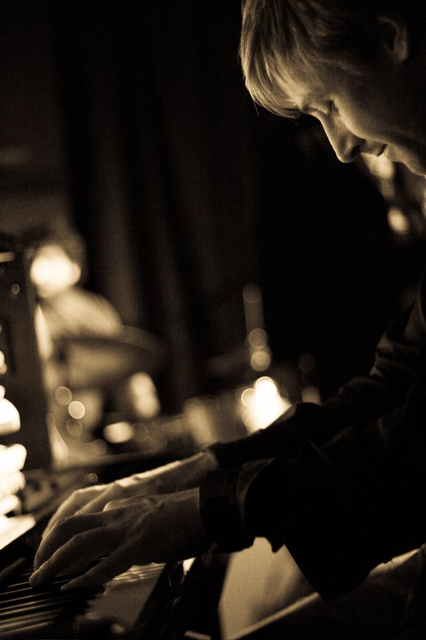
- Jason Reolon

Background information
- Born: November 2, 1976 (age 49)
- Genres: Jazz
- Instrument: Piano
- Years active: 1999–present

Jason Reolon is a South African pianist and son of jazz drummer Bobby Gien (who was a drummer in Ronnie Scott's Trio) and jazz singer Josie Gien. Reolon was winner of the Southern African Music Rights Organisation (SAMRO) National Overseas Scholarship for best Jazz Pianist in 2001. With his jazz band Breakfast Included, he is a 2 times winner of the Old Mutual Jazz Encounters competition. Reolon performed at the Cape Town International Jazz Festival 2004, a spin-off of the North Sea Jazz Festival held in The Netherlands.

== Musical career ==
Reolon graduated from the University of Cape Town's College of Music with a Bachelor of Music degree in jazz performance and composition in 2001, where he has worked as a lecturer ever since.

=== Breakfast Included ===
Reolon is one of four founding members of jazz quartet Breakfast Included in 1999, together with drummer Shaun Michau, Dominic Peters on double bass and David Poole on saxophone. In 2001 they released their self-titled first album, which was followed up by Night Work Ahead in 2004. Breakfast Included won the "Old Mutual Jazz Encounters" competition in both 2000 and 2001. Peters and Poole have since left the ensemble and the current members of Breakfast Included (now a quintet) are Reolon on Piano, Melanie Schultz on vocals, Buddy Wells on saxophone, and Wesley Rustin on double bass.

=== The Restless Natives ===
The Restless Natives is a contemporary quintet, consisting of Kesivan Naidoo on drums, Jason Reolon on piano, Chris Engel on alto and baritone saxophone, Shane Cooper on double bass and Lee Thomson on trumpet and flugelhorn.

=== The Jason Reolon Trio ===
The Jason Reolon Trio is an ensemble that, besides Reolon, consists of Heinrich Goosen on drums and Wesley Rustin on double bass. The trio have released their first album, called Off the Record, in 2008, which is a live recording of the ensemble performing at the Nassau Auditorium in Cape Town, on 4 February 2007.

== Discography ==
CD - Breakfast Included - Breakfast Included (2001) (BICD01) Best of Passion Jazz Volume 2 (2002) - Track: I Thought About You Universal Music - The Jazz Lounge (2002) - Track: I Thought About You CD - Breakfast Included - Night Work Ahead (2005) (BICD05) Palace Lounge - Cafe d’Afrique II, Va Va Voom Edition (2005) - Track: Burnt Toast UCT Jazz - Full Spectrum (2006) - Track: Burnt Toast CD - Jason Reolon Trio - Off the Record (2007) (DIR001) Goldfish - Caught in the Loop (2005) - Tracks: The Real Deal, Dream, Times May Change You, Wait a Minute Breathe Sunshine Volume 2 (2005) - Track: Dream Cafe d’Afrique Volume 2 (2006) - Track: Dream Breathe Sunshine Volume 3 (2006) - Track: The Real Deal Best of Cafe d’Afrique (2007) - Track: The Real Deal Cafe d’Afrique Volume 3 (2007) - Track: Times May Change You Pure Pacha (2008) - Track: The Real Deal CD - Restless Natives - Restless Natives (2010) DVD - Jason Reolon Trio - Double Standards (2010) UCT Jazz Compilation (2010) - Track: Fat Alberts Men's Health Chill Compilation (2010) Track: To Be CD – Jason Reolon Trio - Outline (2011) (JRT02) Feature Film - Restless Natives - Visa Vie (2011) Track: Mirror Mirror + Various
