= Festival Musikdorf Ernen =

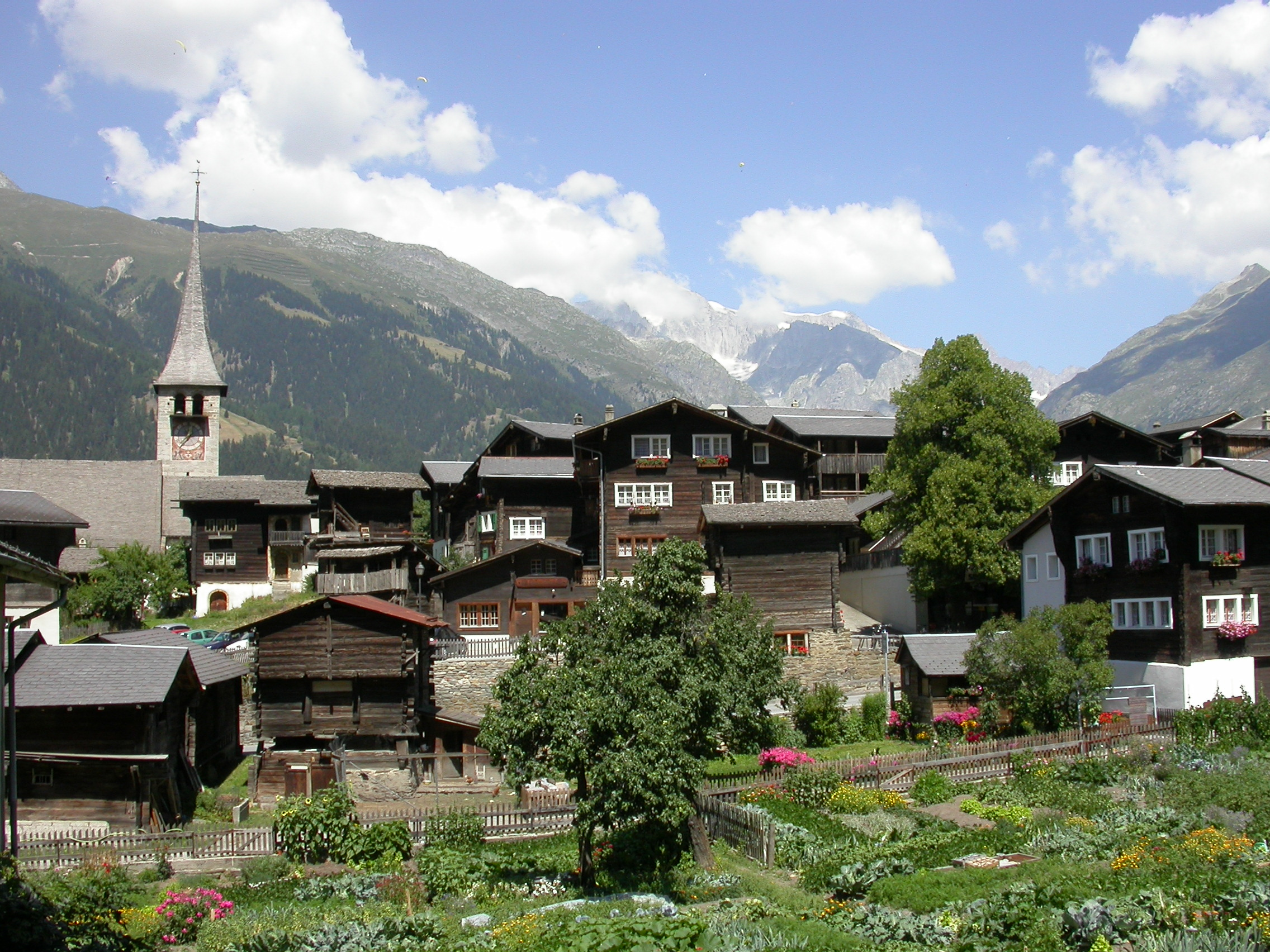

The Festival Musikdorf Ernen (Music Village Ernen) is an international music and literature festival in the Swiss alpine municipality of Ernen, in the Canton of Valais. Founded by the Hungarian pianist and music professor György Sebők in 1974, it is held annually in summer between June and August.

== History ==
The idea of a summer music village came about when György Sebők was travelling on holiday with his wife through the Valais Canton. Enamored of the region, Sebök began to spend more time there, and two years later he hosted the first masterclass (Meisterkurs) for piano and chamber music. Over time, the masterclasses and concerts given by his students evolved to become a music festival, which was named Festival der Zukunft (Festival of the Future). György Sebők was artistic director until his death in 1999.

For the next three years, the festival was run by various artistic directors, until 2004 when Francesco Walter was appointed to the position. Since then, under his directorship, the festival has grown in duration, diversity and audience numbers. In 2012 it was renamed Festival Musikdorf Ernen.

In 2013 the festival won the Prix Montagne, and in 2015 was awarded the Doron Prize.

== Festival programme ==
Under the title ‘Musikdorf Ernen’, there are 5 different festivals:

- Chamber Music Compact
- Piano Compact
- Baroque music – artistic directors: Ada Pesch (founder), 1st concertmaster of the Philharmonia Zurich (Opera House, Zurich), and Deirdre Dowling, principal violist of the Amsterdam Baroque Orchestra
- Chamber Music Plus – artistic director: cellist Xenia Jankovic
- Piano Compact

Additionally, the festival includes the following events:

- Jazz music
- Organ recitals
- Biography writing workshop –hosted by Brigitte Boothe since 2012
- Literature Seminars – led by Donna Leon and Judith Flanders; previous lecturers have been Richard Powers, Tom Holland and Elisabeth Bronfen
- Querlesen (Queer literature) – book presentations by various authors with an emphasis on gender literature, moderated by Bettina Böttinger

The Baroque Festival has its own ensemble in residence, Aernen Barock. The programmes are intentionally balanced between familiar and lesser-known pieces and composers. Similarly, the festival actively promotes and supports young artists and has featured a number of recipients of the Concours Géza Anda award, a prize for emerging pianists. Musikdorf Ernen regularly commissions compositions from composers such as Philip Glass, Alfred Zimmerlin, Ivan Jevtić, Violeta Dinescu and Helena Winkelman.

== Venues ==
The two central venues of the festival are:

- the Church of St. George, Ernen
- the Tellenhaus, a town hall named after the Swiss national hero Wilhelm Tell

Special guest concerts take place in:

- the Fondation Pierre Gianadda, Martigny
- the Stockalper Palace, Brig

== Films about the Musikdorf Ernen ==
- György Sebők, la musique comme langue maternelle. Etienne Blanchon / altomedia (Frankreich 2010).
- György Sebők, une leçon de musique. Etienne Blanchon / altomedia, Idéale Audience International (Frankreich 1998).

== Literature ==
- Verein Musikdorf Ernen: In Memoriam György Sebök
