= Stefan Karlsson (professor) =

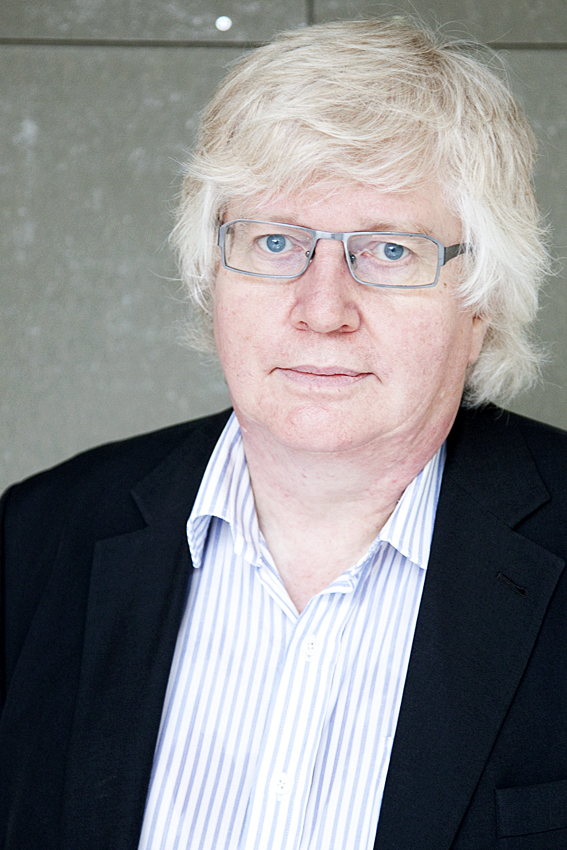

Stefan Karlsson (born Iceland, 31 May 1950) is a Professor of Molecular Medicine and Gene Therapy at the Lund Stem Cell Center, in the Department of Laboratory Medicine, Lund University, Sweden. He is recognized for significant contributions to the fields of gene therapy and hematopoietic stem cell biology and in 2009 was awarded the Tobias Prize by The Royal Swedish Academy of Sciences.

== Career ==
Karlsson's field of research is the regulation of hematopoietic stem cells and development of stem cell expansion protocols and gene therapy. He performed postdoctoral studies with Professor Arthur W. Nienhuis (1983-1986) at the National Heart Lung and Blood Institute (NHLBI) at the National Institutes of Health (NIH), Bethesda Maryland, where he received a Fogarty International Research Collaboration Award. He served as Chief of the Molecular and Medical Genetics Section, Developmental and Metabolic Neurology Branch (DMNB), National Institute for Neurological Disorders and Stroke (NINDS), NIH, 1988-1996. In 1995 he was recruited as a full professor to Lund University, Sweden, where he founded the Division of Molecular Medicine and Gene Therapy and has been head of this division for twenty years. He is also a founding and current member of the Lund Stem Cell Center, since 2003, and director of the Hemato-Linné Strategic Research Environment (2006-2016) funded through a 10-year Linnaeus grant from the Swedish Research Council. Dr. Karlsson also holds a consultant physician position at Skåne University Hospital, Sweden.

== Research ==
Karlsson's early research focused on retroviral vector based gene correction of hematopoietic cells from monogenetic disorders, such as Gaucher’s disease and hemoglobinopathies. The results of these studies led to the first gene therapy clinical trial for the treatment of Gaucher’s disease (1995). He has also developed lentiviral vectors for gene correction of hematopoietic stem cells, and more recently developed preclinical gene therapy models for Gaucher’s disease and Diamond Blackfan anemia. An equal component of his research has been in the field of hematopoietic stem cell biology, where Dr. Karlsson focused on studying the mechanisms of hematopoietic stem cell expansion and maintenance with major contributions to understanding the role of Tgf-beta and more recently Cripto.

== Selected awards and honors ==
- 1994 Elected member of the American Society for Clinical Investigation (ASCI)
- 1997 Elected member of the Royal Physiographic Society in Lund
- 2006 President International Society for Experimental Hematology (ISEH).
- 2009 Tobias Prize awarded by The Royal Swedish Academy of Sciences.
- 2014 Knut and Alice Wallenberg Foundation Excellence in Swedish Research grant.
