= Rievaulx Bridge =

Bridge in Rievaulx, North Yorkshire, England

Coordinates: 54.2511°N 1.1203°W

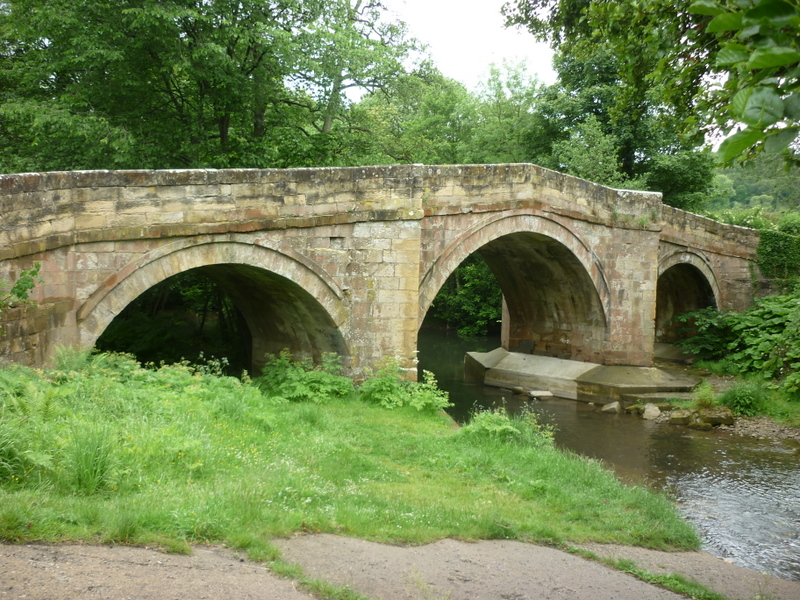
The bridge, in 2011

Rievaulx Bridge is a historic structure in Rievaulx, a village in North Yorkshire, in England.

A bridge over the River Rye in Rievaulx was built in the Mediaeval period, to provide access to Rievaulx Abbey. The bridge was destroyed by a flood in 1754, and was rebuilt shortly afterwards. The structure was grade II listed in 1955. In 2023, it was strengthened with the construction of a concrete saddle across its spans.

The bridge is built of limestone, and consists of three segmental arches, the middle arch wider and taller. There are two cutwaters, a band and plain chamfered parapets.

== See also ==
- Listed buildings in Rievaulx
