= Siege of Wark (1138) =

1138 Siege of Wark by Scotland

Siege of Wark 1138
- Part of the Anarchy
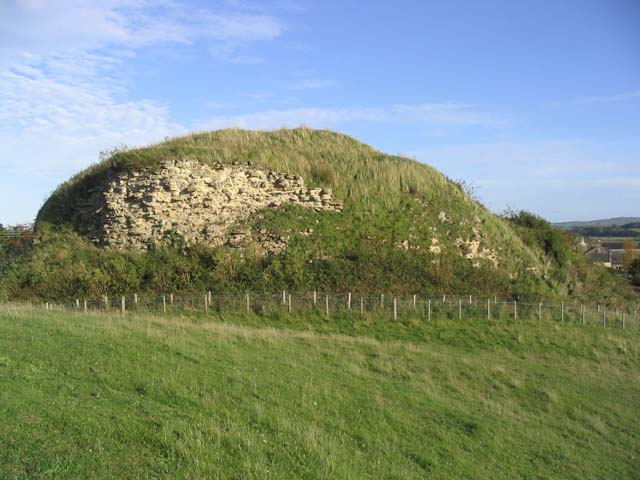
- The ruins of Wark on Tweed Castle
Date	May–November 1138
Location	Wark on Tweed Castle 55.64162°N 2.28196°W
Result	Scottish victory

Belligerents
Kingdom of Scotland	Kingdom of England

Commanders and leaders
King David I	Unknown
- Location of Wark on Tweed Castle within Northumberland Location of Wark on Tweed Castle relative to modern Scotland

The siege of Wark is a 1138 siege of Wark on Tweed Castle (Wark castle) conducted from May–November by Scottish forces under David I against the defending English garrison. The siege was part of a campaign launched by David in support of his niece, the Empress Matilda, and her claim to the English throne over that of Stephen of Blois who had seized the throne in 1135. The invasion followed a similar campaign in 1136 when David had succeeded in gaining control of Cumberland, and raids launched in 1137 and earlier in 1138.

Despite David's defeat at the battle of the Standard in August 1138, the siege continued and the castle fell in November after the abbot of Rievaulx negotiated a surrender allowing the starved defenders to leave honourably with their arms. The fall of Wark contributed to Stephen being forced to cede control of Northumberland to David in 1139. Cumberland and Northumberland would both remain under Scottish control until after David's death in 1153.

== Background ==
=== Anglo-Scottish relations ===
While Henry I ruled England relations between the England and Scotland had been peaceful. David I of Scotland had a good personal relationship with Henry and fully supported Henry's intention to have his daughter, the Empress Matilda, named as his heir. David was Matilda's maternal uncle and would become one of her most powerful supporters. Following Henry's death in 1135 his nephew, Stephen of Blois, seized the throne. David responded by seizing Cumberland and Northumberland.

A treaty was signed in February 1136 by which David retained Cumberland, relinquished lands in Northumberland, and had his son, another Henry, recognised as lord of Huntingdon, for which he did homage to Stephen. Stephen also promised to address Henry's claim to Northumberland. The peace did not last and in 1137 and early 1138, David had launched raids into England planned to coincide with rebellions in southern England by Matilda's supporters. Wark was besieged during this time for three weeks, starting on 10 January. After this, David let loose his army to raid and pillage through Northumberland, before being driven back by the English under Count Waleran by mid February. Stephen responded in kind with a raid upon coastal Lothian. In contrast to the campaigns of 1136 and 1137, no attempt was made to contact David or attempt diplomacy. Stephen then returned to England so abruptly that the chronicler John of Hexham speculated he may have doubted the loyalty of some within his army.

=== English rebellion ===
After Easter 1138 there was a series of rebellions against Stephen across the west of England, with the key defector being Robert of Gloucester, who renounced his fealty to Stephen and declared his support for Matilda's claim to the throne. One defector was Eustace fitz John who reached David as the King was again raiding into England. Eustace's brother, William fitz John, joined Robert's southern campaign, providing a link between the two forces. The Gesta Stephani mentions a letter sent by Matilda to David seeking his support. David responded by reopening his campaign in Northumberland on 8 April. David's army had retreated to Roxburgh while Stephen raided Lothian and now crossed the border with the intention of devastating coastal Northumberland and County Durham.

== Siege ==
=== Siege begins ===
The siege began in May 1138 after David's attention was drawn by the garrison of Wark raiding the Scottish supply lines. This was the only known raid by a castle garrison behind enemy lines in the Scottish invasions of England of 1138 and 1173-1174, and it succeeded in taking hostages for ransom. Richard of Hexham, the closest chronicler, reports that the initial phase of the siege was a sharp fight, with the Scottish employing battering rams and other siege engines. Casualties were high among the attackers, and David left in search of a more decisive victory. Two barons were assigned to continue the blockade of the castle. It was during this time that Eustace fitz John joined David and pushed for the king to assault Bamburgh castle, custody of which Eustace had lost earlier in the year. David instead chose to march south, perhaps intending to put pressure on Stephen.

=== Wider campaign ===
David's army marched south, bypassing Durham and entering Yorkshire at the end of July. The Scots were stopped at Northallerton where they were defeated at the battle of the Standard by an English army assembled by Thurstan, Archbishop of York, on the 22 August. Stephen's issues in the South prevented him from following up on this victory, allowing David to reform his army at Carlisle. While at Carlisle, and by late September, David met the papal legate, Alberic, Bishop of Ostia who negotiated a truce between Scotland and England, whereby the Scots returned all the women who had been carried off during the campaign and it was agreed that they would not attack England again before 11 November 1139. Wark castle was explicitly exempted from these terms, allowing David to continue the siege.

=== Siege ends ===
After the battle of the Standard David returned to Wark. Townsmen joined the garrison in the defence, with much of the Scottish siege equipment being destroyed during a sally by the defenders. David continued to blockade the castle, starving the defenders. In November the abbot of Rievaulx negotiated a surrender allowing the defenders to leave honourably with their arms.

== Aftermath ==
Northumbrian castles held by David after 1138 campaign

David ordered the castle destroyed after it fell. Possession of Wark castle, along with Norham castle, which fell after a short siege, and Alnwick castle, which Eustace fitz John handed over to the Scots, put David in a strong position in the subsequent negotiations, despite his defeat at Northallerton. The Treaty of Durham was signed on the 9 April 1139, wherein Stephen was forced to cede Northumberland to David's control, along with continued enjoyment of the honour of Huntingdon. Despite warfare being renewed in 1141 David would hold on to the provinces of Northumberland and Cumberland, integrating them into Scotland, with Carlisle becoming the usual seat of David's government; he died there in May 1153. Contemporary English writers criticised David for the atrocities committed by his followers during the invasions of 1137 and 1138, but William of Newburgh gives him credit for enforcing peace in Northern England at a time it was conspicuously absent in the south.

The conquest of Northumberland and Cumberland added significantly to the resources available to the Scottish crown, with David being able to use the silver mines of Alston near Carlisle to mint the first native coinage of Scotland and underwrite his programme of monastic foundation.

David's son Henry predeceased David in 1152, leaving Henry's son, the 12-year-old Malcolm IV, to take the throne upon David's death in 1153. Without a mature adult on the throne of Scotland, Northumberland and Cumberland were lost within four years of David's death, beginning nearly a century of struggle for their reclamation.

== Sources ==
- Barrow, G. W. S. (2006). "David I". Oxford Dictionary of National Biography (online ed.). Oxford University Press. doi:10.1093/ref:odnb/7208. (Subscription, Wikipedia Library access or UK public library membership required.)
- Cole, Teresa (15 July 2019). The Anarchy: The Darkest Days of Medieval England. Amberley Publishing Limited. ISBN 978-1-4456-7850-4.
- Crouch, David (6 June 2014). The Reign of King Stephen: 1135-1154. Routledge. ISBN 978-1-317-89297-7.
- Isaac, Steven (2010). "Wark, Sieges of". In Rogers, Clifford J. (ed.). The Oxford encyclopedia of medieval warfare and military technology. New York: Oxford University Press. ISBN 9780195334036.
- King, Edmund (2010). "Stephen". Oxford Dictionary of National Biography (online ed.). Oxford University Press. doi:10.1093/ref:odnb/26365. (Subscription, Wikipedia Library access or UK public library membership required.)
- Matthews, Rupert (2003). "The Standard 1138". England Versus Scotland: Great British Battles. Leo Cooper. ISBN 978-0850529494.
- Oram, Richard (2001). "David I". In Lynch, Michael (ed.). The Oxford companion to Scottish history. Oxford: Oxford University Press. ISBN 9780199234820.
- Spencer, Dan (15 March 2018). The Castle at War in Medieval England and Wales. Amberley Publishing Limited. ISBN 978-1-4456-6269-5.
- Strickland, Matthew (1990). "Securing the North: Invasion and the Strategy of Defence in Twelfth-Century Anglo-Scottish Warfare". In Chibnall, Marjorie (ed.). Anglo-Norman Studies XII: Proceedings of the Battle Conference 1989. Boydell & Brewer Ltd. ISBN 978-0-85115-257-8.
