= St Mary's Church, Rievaulx =

Church in Rievaulx, North Yorkshire, England

Coordinates: 54°15′33″N 1°06′56″W

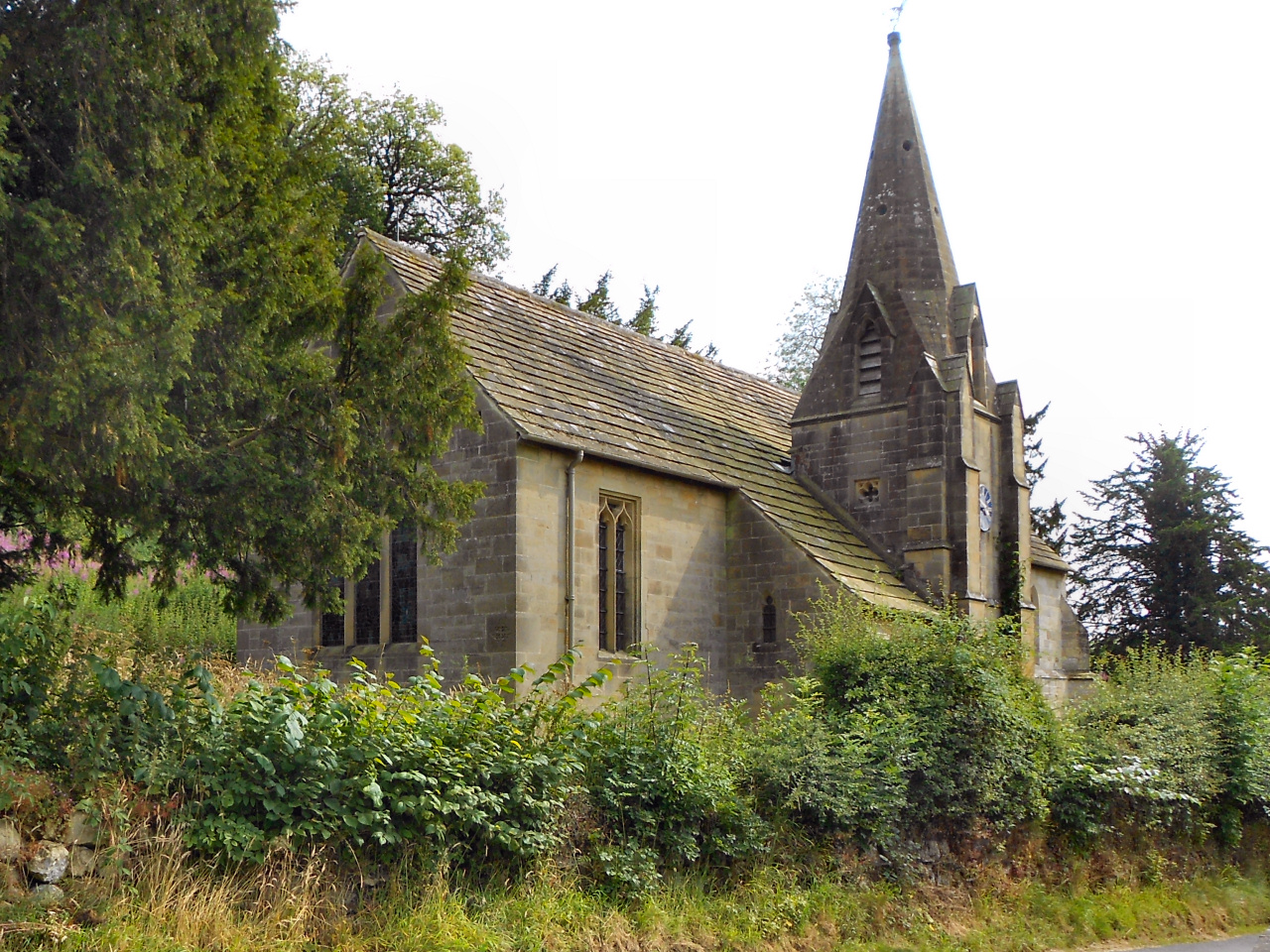
The church, in 2011

St Mary's Church is an Anglican church in Rievaulx, a village in North Yorkshire, in England.

A small chapel was built outside the gate of Rievaulx Abbey, in the 13th century. It was a small, rectangular, building, with a western gallery. It survived the Dissolution of the Monasteries and an east window was added in the Tudor period, but then fell into ruin. In 1906, the ruins were incorporated into a larger church, to a design by Temple Moore. The building was grade II listed in 1985.

The church is built in limestone and sandstone, and has a stone slate roof. It consists of a nave and a chancel in a single cell, with a vestry, and a steeple projecting from the north side. The steeple has a tower with two stages, angle buttresses, a clock face and a broach spire. The Tudor window has been reset in the north wall, while the other windows were added by Moore.

== See also ==
- Listed buildings in Rievaulx
