= Wardon Abbey =

Building in Old Warden, Bedfordshire, England

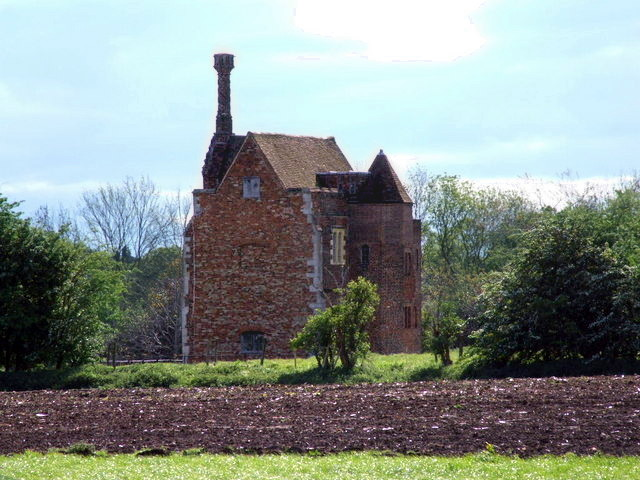
- Interactive map of Wardon Abbey

Monastery information
- Full name: Abbey Church of the Blessed Virgin Mary, Old Warden
- Other name: Warden Abbey
- Order: Cistercian
- Established: 1135; 891 years ago
- Disestablished: 1537; 489 years ago

Site
- Location: Old Warden, Bedfordshire, England
- Coordinates: 52.081389°N 0.363333°W

Wardon or Warden Abbey, Bedfordshire, was one of the senior Cistercian houses of England, founded about 1135 from Rievaulx Abbey. It is a Grade I listed building.

== History ==
The patron was Walter Espec, who had founded the mother house and settled the new community on one of his inherited estates, on unprofitable wasteland, as its early name, St Mary de Sartis, implied, just the kind of remote, uninhabited sites specified by the founders of the Cistercian order. The first abbot, Simon, was a pupil of Aelred, Abbot of Rievaulx. The success of the abbey may be inferred from the foundation of a daughter house, Sibton Abbey, Suffolk, as soon as 1150. The village of Old Warden, Bedfordshire grew up under the Abbey's protection. Great accumulated Cistercian wealth enabled Wardon Abbey to be rebuilt on a grand scale in the early fourteenth century, with complex tiling in carpet-patterns and pictorial vignettes pieced together in shaped tiles that approached a boldly scaled mosaic. Gilding of the carved details was so lavishly laid on that in 1848, after demolition and burial, recovered fragments retained their brightness. By 1252 the monks had more land under cultivation than they could work by their own labour in the early Cistercian way: nineteen granges were recorded in that year. From the orchards at Wardon came the Warden pear, rated the best of English pears, and so distinctive that a pie made from them was a "wardon pie": "I must have Saffron to colour the Warden Pies" (Shakespeare, The Winter's Tale iv.3). In Two Fifteenth-Century Cookery-Books, edited by Thomas Austin for the Early English Text Society (Original Series, Volume 91), a recipe is given (p. 51) for "Quyncis or Wardouns in past".

The later fourteenth century was a period of retrenchment and decline, in the wake of the Black Death. Wardon Abbey was dissolved in 1537 under Henry VIII, and the estate was sold for £389 16s 6d. The new owner demolished most of the buildings in 1552 to sell the materials, and then built a new red brick mansion, bearing the name Warden Abbey House. Later in 1790, most of this Tudor house was pulled down by its owners, the Whitbreads of nearby Southill, leaving only a north-east wing, which still stands today. The Landmark Trust rescued the building from dereliction in 1974 and renovated it in exchange for a long lease; it can now be rented for holidays.

== Burials ==
- Anne Woodville
- George Grey, 2nd Earl of Kent

== Gallery of tiling from Warden Abbey on display in Bedford Museum ==
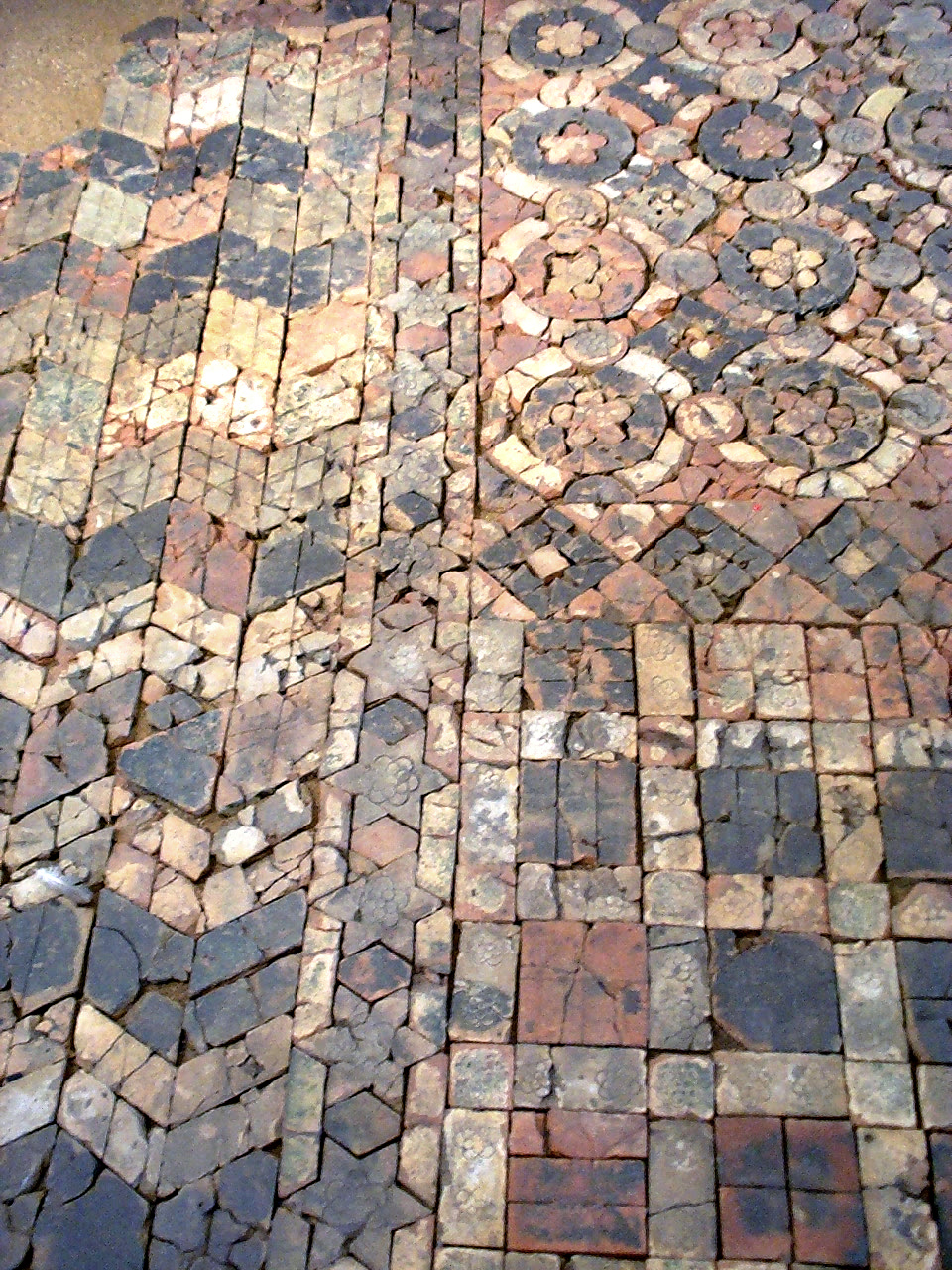
Reconstructed tiled flooring

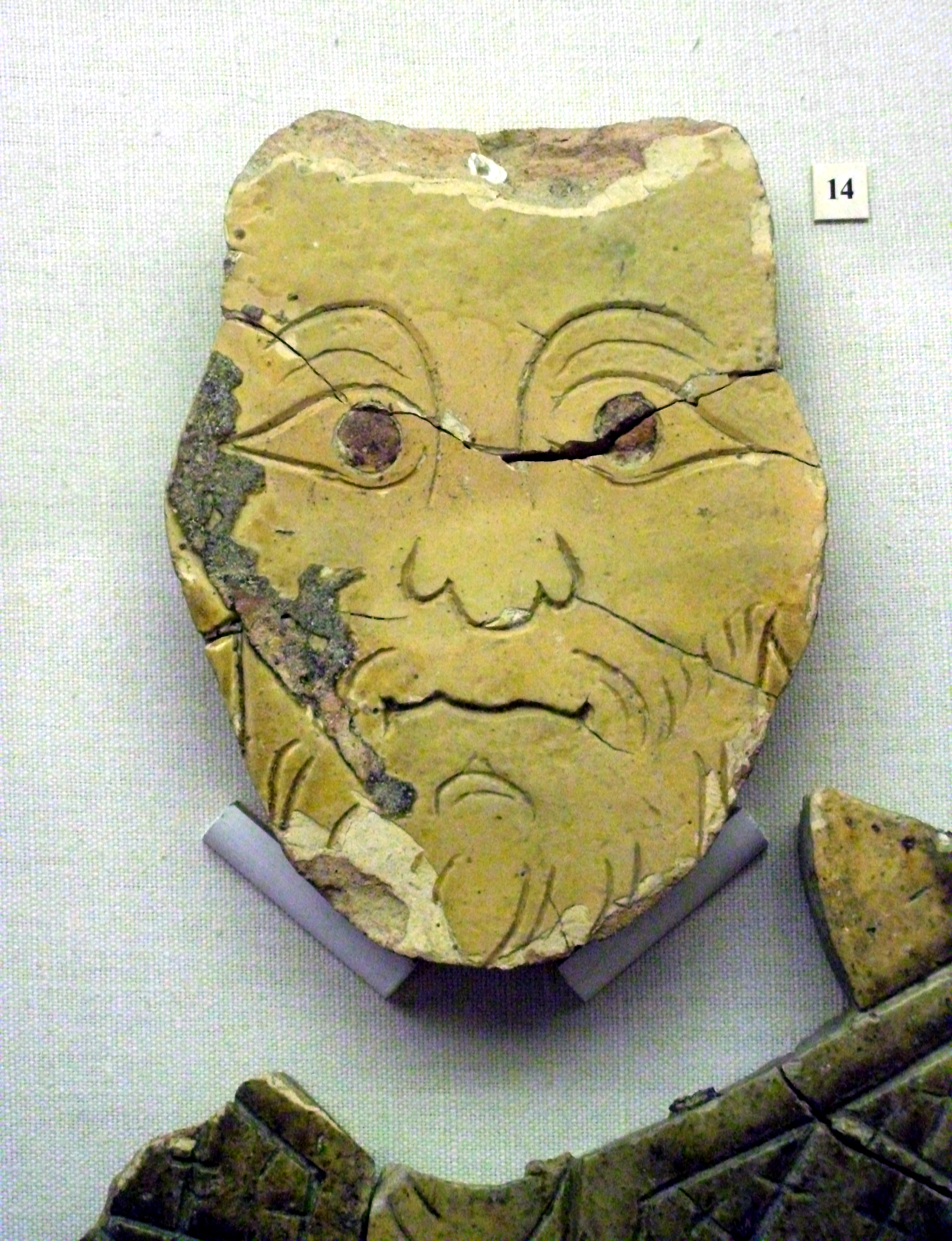
Face tile from a life size figure

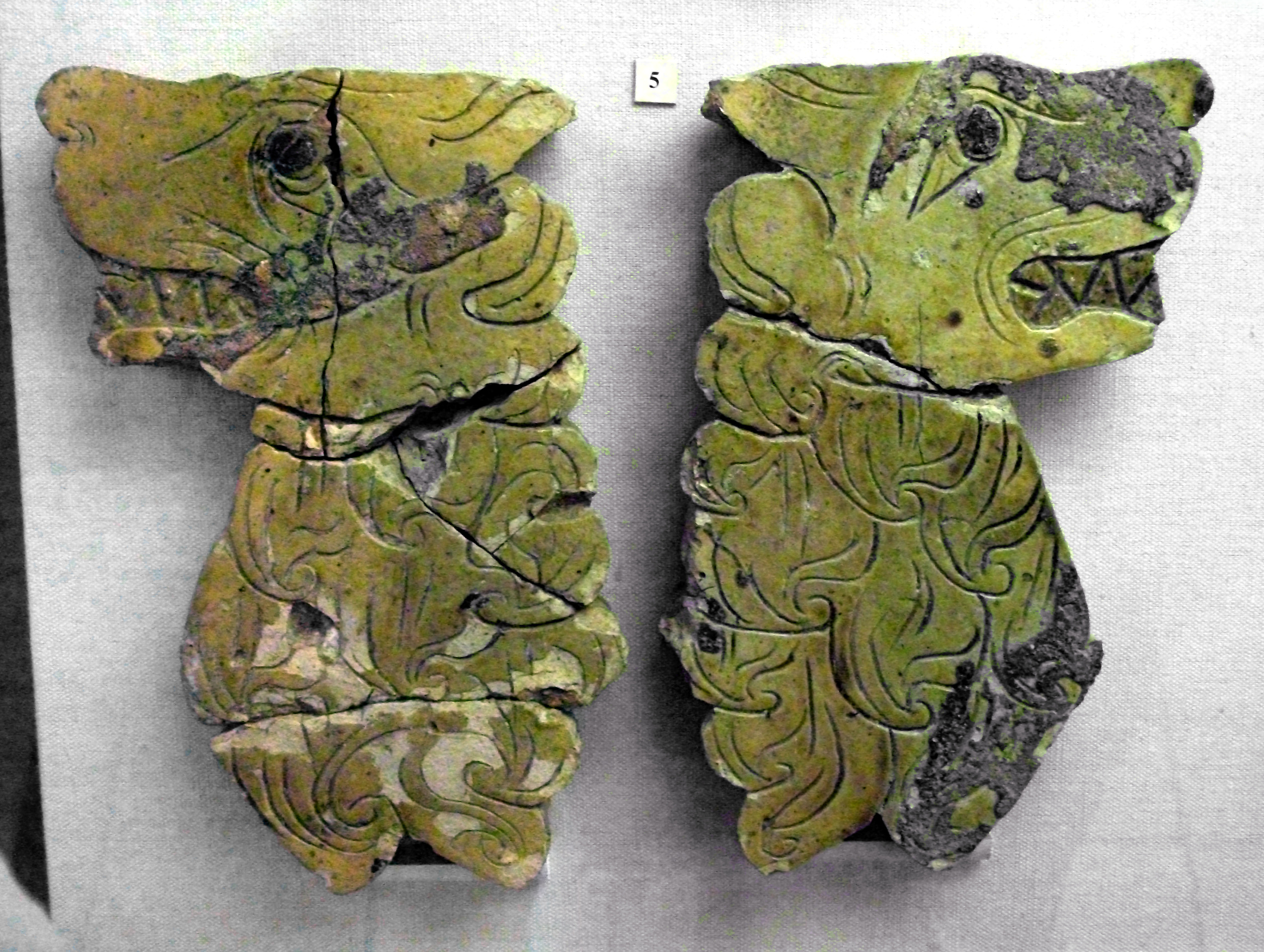
Two lions

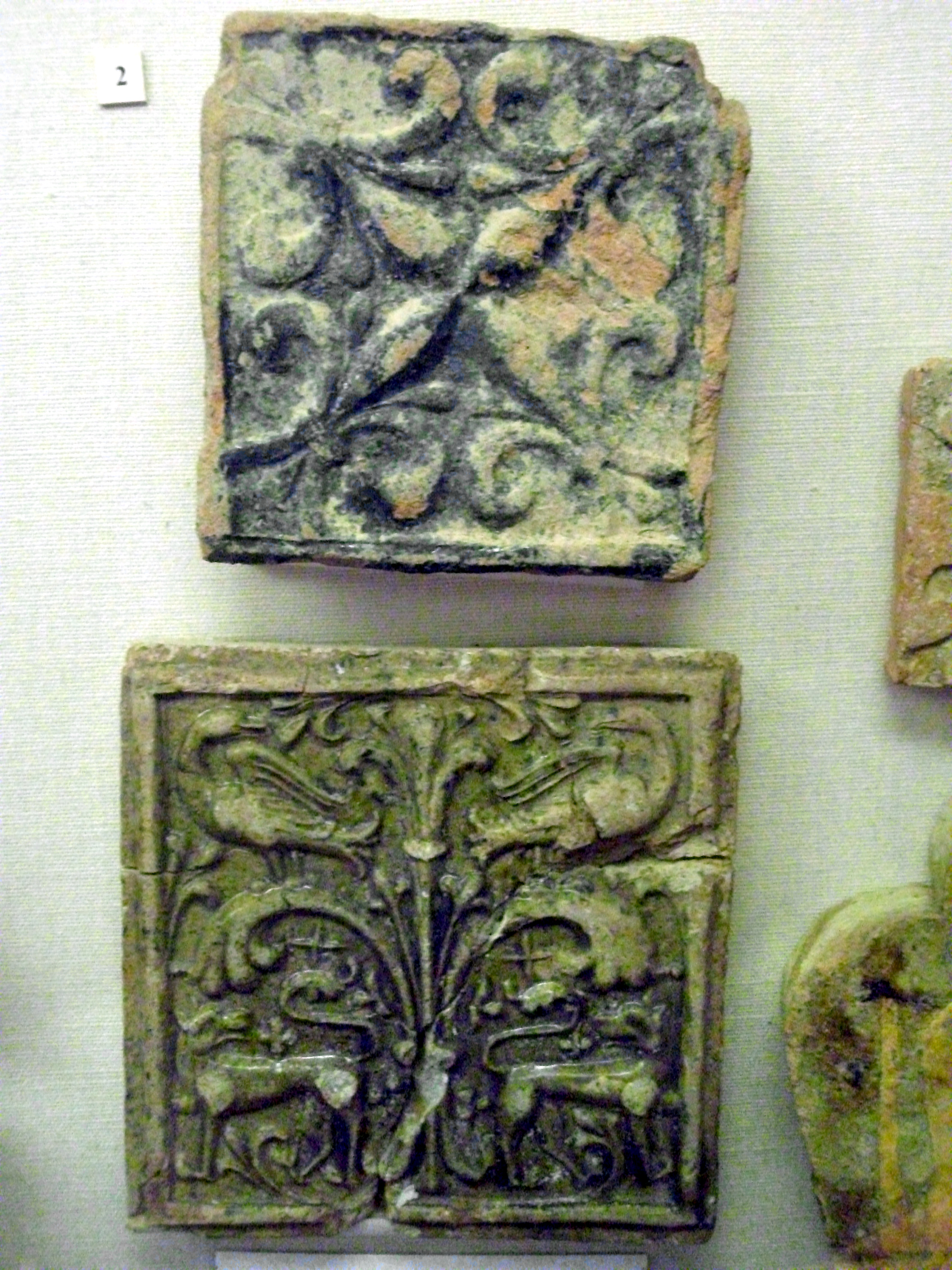
Decorated tiles

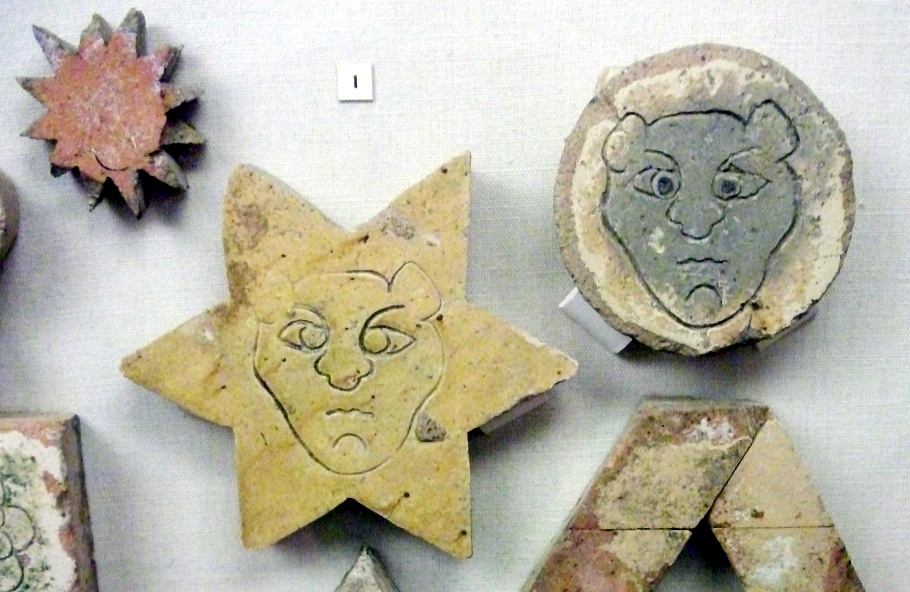
Line-impressed tiles

== See also ==
- List of monastic houses in Bedfordshire
