= Rievaulx Mill =

Mill building in Rievaulx, North Yorkshire, England

Coordinates: 54°15′32″N 1°07′05″W

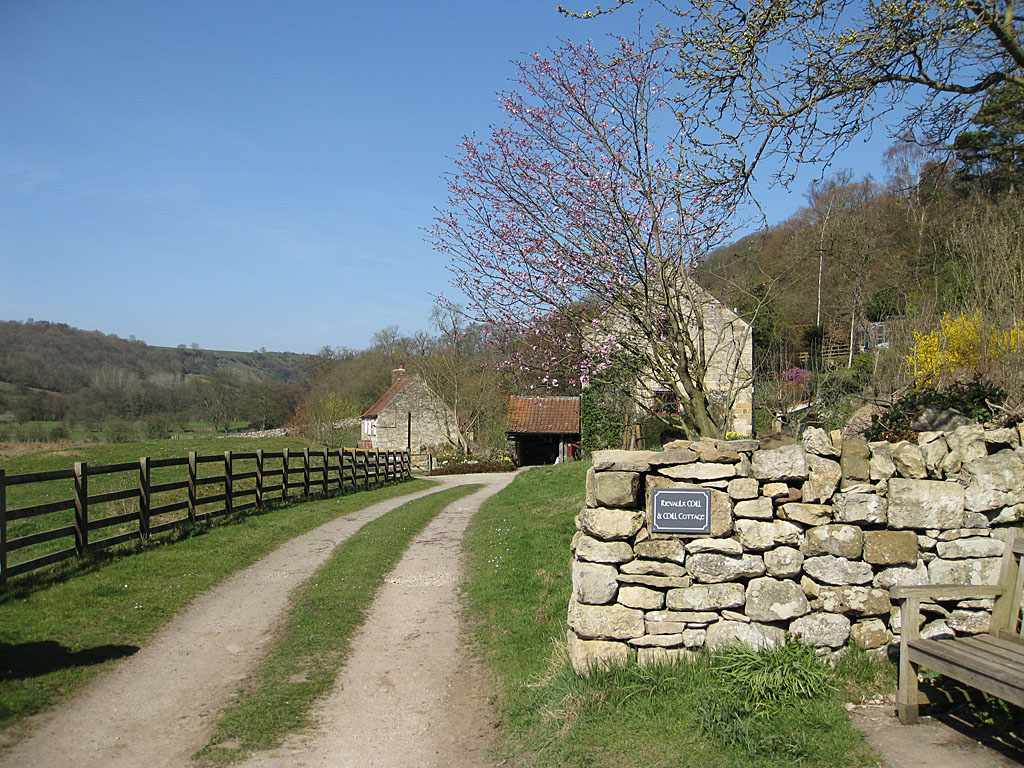
The building, in 2012

Rievaulx Mill is a historic building in Rievaulx, a village in North Yorkshire, in England.

The watermill lies on the River Rye. The corn mill and attached cartshed were built in the late 18th century and extended to the left in the 19th century. The building was grade II listed in 1955. In 1988, David and Wyn Johnson converted the building into a house.

The mill and cartshed are built of sandstone and limestone, and have pantile roofs, the mill roof with gable coping. They form an L-shaped plan, with the cartshed protruding on the left. The mill has three storeys, and contains a doorway under a stone arch, pitching doors, a casement window in the middle floor, and horizontally sliding sashes in the top floor. In the middle floor is a row of 14th-century corbels from Rievaulx Abbey, and at the right end is a large waterwheel. The extension includes a section of 14th-century frieze from the abbey. The cartshed has one storey, and two bays divided by a massive timber post.

== See also ==
- Listed buildings in Rievaulx
