= Swiss Cottage (disambiguation) =

Swiss Cottage is a district of London.

Swiss Cottage may also refer to:

- Swiss Cottage (ward), an electoral ward in London
- Swiss Cottage, Cahir, a building in Cahir, Tipperary
- Swiss Cottage, Rievaulx, a Grade II listed building in North Yorkshire
- Swiss Cottage, Rockfield, Monmouthshire, Wales
- Swiss Cottage tube station, a London Underground station at Swiss Cottage, north London
- Swiss Cottage tube station (1868–1940), a disused London Underground station
