= Swiss Cottage, Rievaulx =

Listed house in Yorkshire

Swiss Cottage
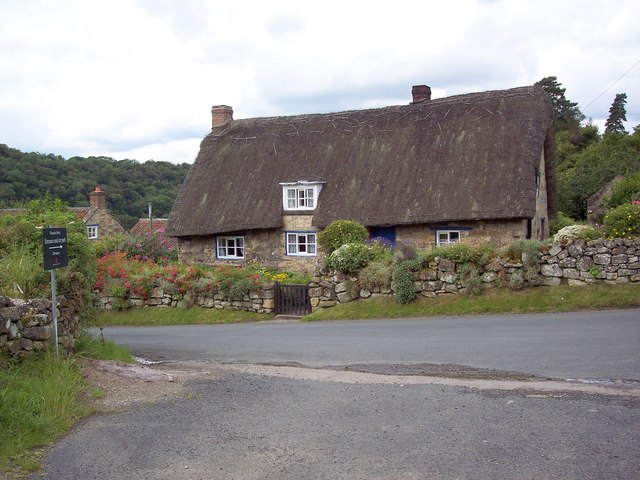
- The cottage in 2007

- Location within North Yorkshire

General information
- Location: Main Street, Rievaulx, North Yorkshire, England
- Coordinates: 54.25865°N 1.1175°W
- Estimated completion: 17th century

Listed Building – Grade II
- Designated: 4 January 1955
- Reference no.: 1175760

Swiss Cottage is a Grade II listed building in the English village of Rievaulx, North Yorkshire. It dates to at least the 17th century, with earlier origins. Swiss Cottage is part of the Rievaulx estate, which is currently owned by the Beckett baronets of Kirkdale Manor.

== See also ==
- Listed buildings in Rievaulx
