= Listed buildings in Rievaulx =

Rievaulx is a civil parish in the county of North Yorkshire, England. It contains 22 listed buildings that are recorded in the National Heritage List for England. Of these, five are listed at Grade I, the highest of the three grades, and the others are at Grade II, the lowest grade. The parish contains the village of Rievaulx and the surrounding countryside, including part of the grounds of Duncombe Park. The most important building in the parish is Rievaulx Abbey, now in ruins and listed at Grade I. The other buildings listed at this grade are two temples on Rievaulx Terrace, and two buildings associated with Duncombe Park. The rest of the listed buildings consist of houses and cottages, a well, bridges, a watermill, three mileposts, and a church.

== Key ==
Grade	Criteria
I	Buildings of exceptional interest, sometimes considered to be internationally important
II	Buildings of national importance and special interest

== Buildings ==
Name and location	Photograph	Date	Notes	Grade
Rievaulx Abbey; 54.25758°N 1.11606°W		12th century	The abbey church and the monastic buildings, which are in limestone and sandstone, are now in ruins. A substantial amount of the church remains.	I
Abbots Well; 54.25939°N 1.11731°W	—	Medieval	The well is in limestone and is rectangular.	II
Severadus and Bank Cottage; 54.25963°N 1.11516°W		17th century (probable)	The house is divided into two, and has a cruck frame, with walls of sandstone, and a pantile roof. There are two storeys and four bays. On the front is a doorway and casement windows, and inside, there are two pairs of crucks.	II
Swiss Cottage; 54.25865°N 1.11691°W		17th century (probable)	The house has a cruck frame, with walls of limestone and sandstone, and a thatched roof. There is one storey and an attic, and three bays. On the front is a doorway, the windows are horizontally sliding sashes, and in the attic is a half-dormer.	II
Mill Cottage; 54.25887°N 1.11846°W		Early 18th century	The house is in sandstone and has a pantile roof. There are two storeys and three bays. In the centre is a wooden porch, above it is a blocked square window, and the other windows are a mix of casements and horizontally sliding sashes.	II
Rye House; 54.25512°N 1.11859°W		Early 18th century	The house is in limestone, and has a pantile roof with gable coping and shaped kneelers. There are two storeys and two bays, and a rear oushut. The doorway is in the centre, and the windows are casements.	II
Mill House; 54.25816°N 1.11819°W	—	1729	The house is in sandstone with quoins, and a French tile roof with gable coping and shaped kneelers. There are two storeys and three bays. To the left of the central doorway is a datestone. The windows on the ground floor are horizontally sliding sashes, and on the upper floor they are casements.	II
Mill Bridge; 54.23419°N 1.07147°W		Mid 18th century	The bridge, in the grounds of Duncombe Park, crosses the River Rye. It is in rusticated sandstone, and consists of three segmental arches, the middle arch taller and broader. The bridge has buttresses, a band, and a coped parapet with drums at the ends.	II
Rievaulx Bridge; 54.25109°N 1.12041°W		Mid 18th century	The bridge carries a road over the River Rye. It is in limestone, and consists of three segmental arches, the middle arch wider and taller. There are two cutwaters, a band and plain chamfered parapets.	II
Doric Temple; 54.25212°N 1.11543°W		1758	The temple is on Rievaulx Terrace and is in sandstone with a lead roof. It has a circular plan with twelve baseless Doric columns on a podium. Ten steps lead up to the doorway, and there are thee round-headed sash windows. Above is a frieze with triglyphs, metopes, and paterae. The temple has a low drum and a hemispherical dome. Inside are medieval floor tiles from Rievaulx Abbey.	I
Ionic Temple; 54.25809°N 1.11228°W		1758	The temple is on Rievaulx Terrace and is in limestone with a lead roof. It has a rectangular plan and a tetrastyle Ionic portico with a dentiled pediment. Twelve steps lead up the podium, and a doorway with a moulded surround. Inside, there is a panelled room and a painted coved ceiling.	I
Furnace Hill; 54.25793°N 1.11760°W	—	Late 18th century	The house, which was later extended, is in sandstone on a plinth, and has a pantile roof. There are two storeys, the original part has two bays, the extension has a single bay on a different line, and there is a small outshut on the right. On the original part are a doorway, horizontally sliding sash windows and a fixed fire window. The extension contains a doorway and a casement window.	II
Rievaulx Mill and Cartshed; 54.25880°N 1.11804°W		Late 18th century	The watermill and cartshed are in sandstone and limestone, and have pantile roofs, the mill roof with gable coping. They form an L-shaped plan, with the cartshed protruding on the left. The mill has three storeys, and contains a doorway under a stone arch, pitching doors, a casement window in the middle floor, and horizontally sliding sashes in the top floor. In the middle floor is a row of 14th-century corbels from Rievaulx Abbey, and at the right end is a waterwheel. The cartshed has one storey, and two bays divided by a massive timber post.	II
Stiltons Farm; 54.25352°N 1.08208°W		Late 18th century	The farmhouse is in limestone, with quoins and a Westmorland slate roof with gable coping and shaped kneelers. There are three storeys, a double depth plan, three bays, a rear cross-wing, and an outshut on the left. In the centre is a porch and a doorway with a rectangular fanlight, and the windows are a mix of casements and horizontally sliding sashes.	II
Bow Bridge; 54.26313°N 1.12709°W		Late 18th or early 19th century (probable)	The bridge carries Arden Lane over the River Rye. It is in sandstone and consists of a single segmental arch. The bridge has a band and a coped parapet, the arch is flanked by buttresses, and at the end of each parapet are drums.	II
Woodview; 54.25802°N 1.11844°W	—	Late 18th or early 19th century	The cottage is in sandstone with a pantile roof. There are two storeys and three bays, and an extension on the right. On the front is a doorway, and the windows are horizontally sliding sashes.	II
Gates and railings, Duncombe Park; 54.23920°N 1.07542°W		1845	The gates and railings were designed by Charles Barry. They are in wrought iron, and are supported by rusticated Tuscan columns with ball finials. The gate posts are in sandstone and consist of plain drum columns supporting plain entablatures carrying a horse on the left, and a lion to the right, both bearing arms, and clasped by four rusticated Tuscan columns with ball finials.	I
Southern Stable Block, Duncombe Park; 54.23868°N 1.07500°W		1846	The stable block was designed by Charles Barry, and is attached to the house by a quadrant wall. It is in sandstone, with a dentilled cornice, a parapet, and urns at the corners. There is one storey and attics, and a square plan with ranges around an open courtyard. The front has seven bays, the outer bays flanked by rusticated pilasters, and containing round-headed recesses with keystones, above which are semicircular windows. The central bays form a round-arched arcade with rusticated pilasters and keystones. The attics contain casement windows.	I
Milestone east-southeast of Rievaulx village 54.25087°N 1.08324°W		Late 19th century	The milepost on the south side of the B1257 road is in cast iron. It has a triangular plan, a rounded head, and a sloping face. On the head is inscribed "North Riding of Yorkshire", and on the sloping face is "Helmsley RDC". The sides have pointing arrows, on the left side is the distance to Stokesley, and on the right side to Helmsley.	II
Milestone east of Rievaulx village 54.25875°N 1.10494°W		Late 19th century	The milepost on the southwest side of the B1257 road is in cast iron. It has a triangular plan, a rounded head, and a sloping face. On the head is inscribed "North Riding of Yorkshire", and on the sloping face is "Helmsley RDC". The sides have pointing arrows, on the left side is the distance to Stokesley, and on the right side to Helmsley.	II
Milestone north of Rievaulx village 54.26991°N 1.12045°W	—	Late 19th century	The milepost on the west side of the B1257 road is in cast iron. It has a triangular plan, a rounded head, and a sloping face. On the head is inscribed "North Riding of Yorkshire", and on the sloping face is "Helmsley RDC". The sides have pointing arrows, on the left side is the distance to Stokesley, and on the right side to Helmsley.	II
St Mary's Church; 54.25922°N 1.11557°W		1906	The church was designed by Temple Moore, and built on the site of a 13th century church, incorporating material from it. The church is built in limestone and sandstone, and has a stone slate roof. It consists of a nave and a chancel in a single cell, with a vestry, and a steeple projecting from the north side. The steeple has a tower with two stages, angle buttresses, a clock face and a broach spire.	II
