= Wark on Tweed Castle =

Ruined C12 castle in Northumberland, England

- Northumberland, England, UK
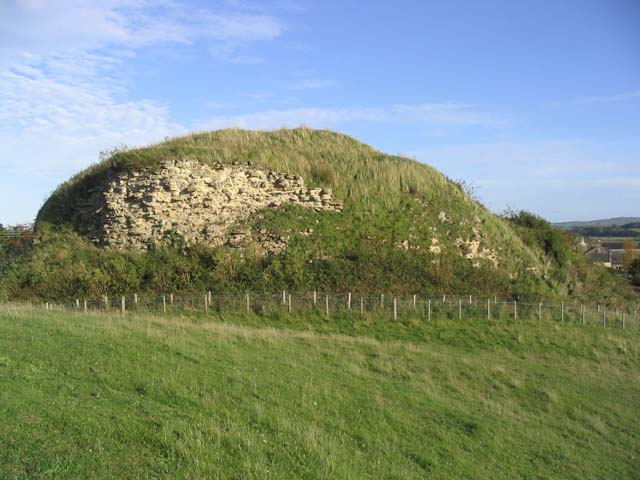
- The ruins of Wark on Tweed Castle

Location
- Location in Northumberland
- Coordinates: 55.64162°N 2.28196°W
- Grid reference: NT822388

Wark on Tweed Castle, sometimes referred to as Carham Castle, is a ruined motte-and-bailey castle at the west end of Wark on Tweed in Northumberland. The ruins are a Grade II* listed building.

== History ==
The castle, which was built by Walter Espec in 1136, was destroyed by the Scots following a siege in 1138 and then rebuilt between 1157 and 1161. An octagonal keep was built on the motte in the early 13th century at roughly the same time that the towers and gatehouse were added. It was here that in 1349 King Edward III bent down and assisted the "Countess of Salisbury" (either Edward's future daughter-in-law Joan of Kent or her former mother-in-law, Catherine Montagu, Countess of Salisbury) with her garter and, in honour of that moment, subsequently founded the Order of the Garter.

Thomas Dacre described the newly refurbished castle in June 1518 after work directed by the Master Mason of Berwick. The donjon or keep was finished, and fit to mount great cannon on each vaulted floor. Cannon could be hoisted up the donjon through an internal well. The watchman on top could see Norham and the outskirts of Berwick. There were three wards or courtyards, almost complete.

=== Invasion by the Duke of Albany and repairs ===
A Scottish army commanded by Regent Albany besieged Wark in November 1522, and Sir William Lisle defended the castle against the French assault troops, helped by bad weather. Advance warning of Albany's invasion plan was sent to the English commanders by the Prioress of Coldstream and the Prioress of Eccles. The weather was poor and it was thought that Scottish artillery could not be brought to the border. However, the Scottish guns were set up to batter Wark. After two days Albany's force of 2,000 men (mostly French) crossed the Tweed in boats. They penetrated the inner court but were repulsed by William Lisle's garrison. The Earl of Surrey wrote that newly built bulwarks of earth had made the Castle better able to withstand a siege. He found it hard to maintain a garrison, and wished the castle was in the sea so there could be no deserters.

In September 1523 the Earl of Surrey, William Frankelyn, Chancellor of Durham, and Sir William Bulmer, Sheriff of Durham viewed the defences at Wark and Norham Castle. Surrey gave orders for new bulwarks and earthwork defences at Wark. He thought the inner ward could withstand a 10 day siege, but the outer ward could only be held for 2 days. He thought the keep at Wark was as strong as any he had seen, and stronger than the keep at Guînes.

In June 1524 Cardinal Wolsey ordered repairs to the keep or donjon walls and lead for the roof was to be brought from Dunstanburgh Castle. George Lawson reported to Thomas Cromwell in March 1533 that the walls by the waterside had fallen.

=== John Carr and Archangelo Arcano ===
The Captain of Wark, John Carr, was captured at the battle of Haddon Rig in August 1542 and a number of men from the garrison, commanded by John Tempest, were lost or injured. During repairs in September 1542 carts carrying stone from Carham church to the castle were attacked by Scottish raiders. Over £1,800 was spent on the castle in 1543, but an Italian military engineer commented that Wark was still a "marvellous great ruin".

In 1544, during the war of the Rough Wooing, John Carr, captain of Wark, complained that a length of curtain wall had fallen, near the river. In February 1545 an Italian military engineer Archangelo Arcano was sent to advise on repairs. He sent a plan to the Earl of Shrewsbury, noting particularly that the roofs were leaking. Lead could be brought from Kelso Abbey, which Arcano was also fortifying. The names of the garrison and the numbers of cannon were listed in March 1545. There was a saker and a broken falcon cannon on top of the donjon. Ralph Sadler reported on the border garrisons, writing that John Carr was "surely a good borderer", and "esper in these frontier wars".

=== War in 1557 ===
Scotland was at war with England in 1557, and Sir Ralph Grey passed control of the castle to the crown. It was held and defended by Sir John Slingsby, a brother-in-law of the Earl of Northumberland. After peace was concluded in 1559, the Earl of Northumberland asked the Privy Council of England for advice on the future of the castle. He suggested the site should be surveyed by John Brende or Richard Lee.

=== Later 16th century ===
During the Marian Civil War, Rowland Foster, captain of Wark, came into Scotland and raided Blyth in Lauderdale, a property of William Maitland of Lethington in May 1570. James VI of Scotland passed by on the other side of the Tweed on 26 April 1588 and was saluted by the castle cannon, and he sent a reward of 20 crowns. The castle cannon saluted the Scottish rebel Earl of Bothwell twice in 1594, which angered James VI.

In December 1604, the inhabitants of Berwick requested the use of smaller cannon removed from Wark to defend the town and harbour.
