= Rievaulx =

Village and civil parish in North Yorkshire, England

Coordinates: 54°15′31″N 1°07′02″W

- Village
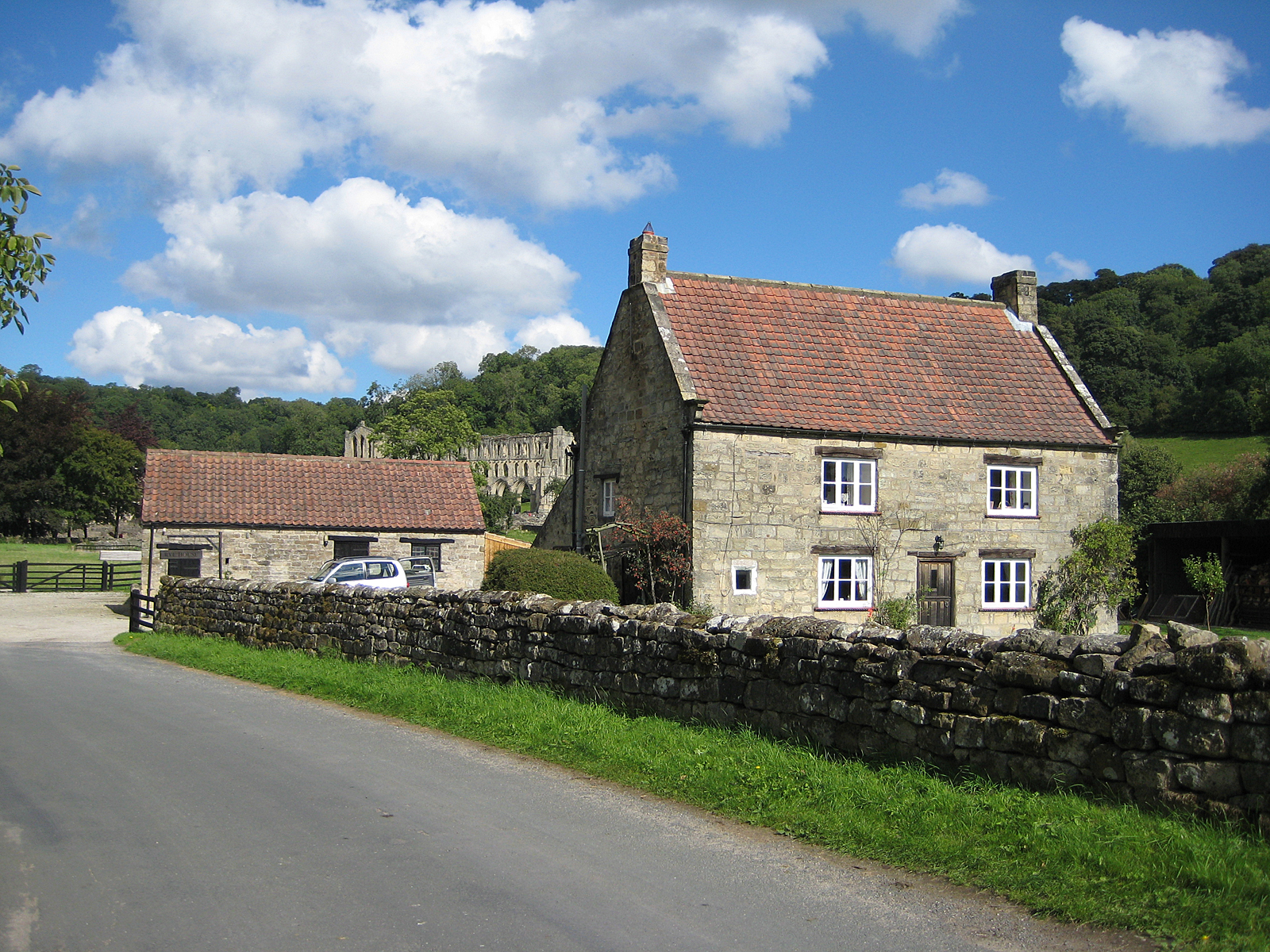
- Cottage in Rievaulx village

- Location within North Yorkshire
- Population: 90 (2015 NYCC)
- Unitary authority: North Yorkshire
- Ceremonial county: North Yorkshire
- Region: Yorkshire and the Humber
- Country: England
- Sovereign state: United Kingdom
- Police: North Yorkshire
- Fire: North Yorkshire
- Ambulance: Yorkshire

Rievaulx (/ˈriːvoʊ/ REE-voh, locally /ˈɹɪvəz/ traditionally) is a small village and civil parish in Rye Dale within the North York Moors National Park near Helmsley in North Yorkshire, England and is located in what was the inner court of Rievaulx Abbey, close to the River Rye. The population of the civil parish as taken at the 2011 Census was less than 100. Details are included in the civil parish of Sproxton, North Yorkshire.

== History ==
The inner court of the monastery contained buildings such as the brewhouse, bakehouse and guesthouse. Its name originated as Rye (the river) + Norman-French val or valle = "valley". Its old local pronunciation was as "Rivers", and changed to "Reevo" when education brought a general familiarity with the French language.

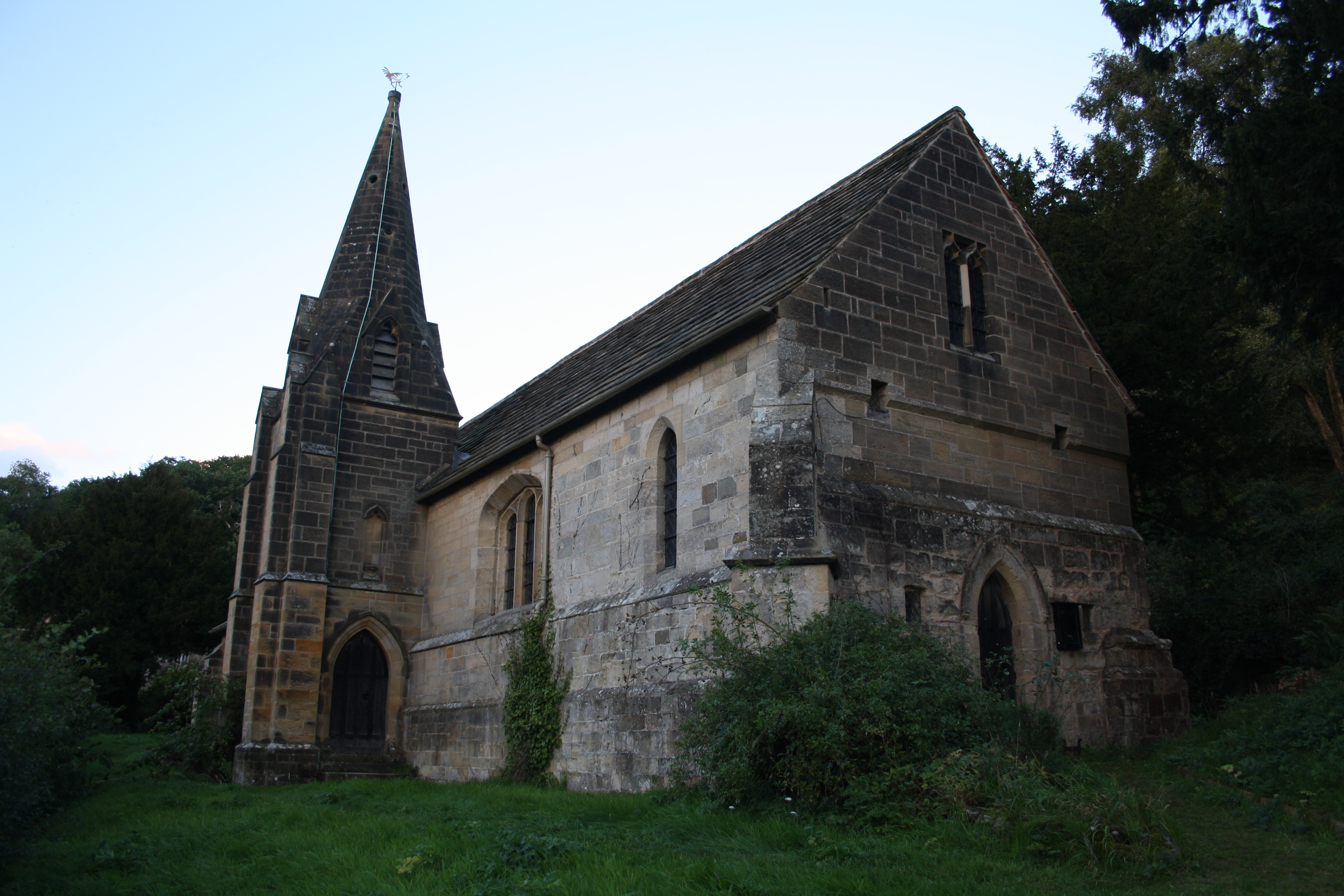
St Mary the Virgin

Aelred of Rievaulx, the English Cistercian monk, was abbot of Rievaulx from 1147 until his death in 1167. He is regarded by Anglicans and Roman Catholics as a saint, and is buried in the Abbey.

The abbey was closed as part of the Dissolution of the Monasteries by Henry VIII in 1538 and the grounds were bought by the Earl of Rutland. He was keen to continue the iron-smelting industry which had been conducted by the monks. He therefore established a charcoal-fired blast furnace and the associated structures and workings in what became Rievaulx village. This continued until its disruption during the Civil War, with production ceasing in 1647.

The village then became agricultural in nature and remains as a small settlement, situated below the Abbey and the Rievaulx Terrace and Temples. Rievaulx Mill has been converted into a house around the workings, many of which are still extant, including the mill wheel, though the mill has been out of operation for a long time. The miller's cottage also still stands and is a separate abode. Almost all of the other buildings in the village are built with stones from the ruins of the Abbey. The only buildings built with materials from other sources are the buildings constructed after 1917, following the conservation of the Abbey.

St Mary's Church, Rievaulx is a grade II listed building converted by the architect Temple Moore in 1906. The building was formerly the slipper chapel to the abbey. A slipper chapel was a small building where pilgrims would remove their footwear before completing their pilgrimage into a cathedra, or place of worship.

When he was raised to the House of Lords in 1983, former prime minister Harold Wilson took the title Baron Wilson of Rievaulx, but chose to pronounce it Rivers (see above).

== Governance ==
Historically the village was in the wapentake of Ryedale, and in the ecclesiastical parish of Helmsley, in the North Riding. It was latterly in the Helmsley Rural District and was moved into the North Riding of Yorkshire in 1974. The village is in its own civil parish, but population statistics were assessed in 2011 as part of Sproxton Parish. In 2015, North Yorkshire County Council estimated the population of Rievaulx to be 90. From 1974 to 2023 it was part of the district of Ryedale. It is now administered by the unitary North Yorkshire Council.

Rievaulx is represented at Westminster as part of the Thirsk and Malton Constituency.

Population of Rievaulx 1801–2015
1801	1811	1821	1831	1841	1851	1861	1871	1881	1891	1901	1911	1921	1931	1951	1961	2011	2015
223	212	212	225	216	209	229	225	227	208	181	170	191	208	173	140	60 (Note: Estimated population.)	50 (Note: Estimated population.)

== Rievaulx Moor ==
Rievaulx Moor is situated to the north of Rievaulx village.

== See also ==
- Listed buildings in Rievaulx
