= Rievaulx Terrace =

Historic landscaped terrace in North Yorkshire, England

- Location within North Yorkshire
- 54.25832°N 1.11083°W
- Type: Park and Garden

History
- Built: c. 1758
- Built for: Thomas Duncombe II

Site notes
- Owner: National Trust
- Website: www.nationaltrust.org.uk/rievaulx-terrace

Listed Building – Grade I
- Official name: Rievaulx Terrace
- Designated: 10 May 1984
- Reference no.: 1001072

Listed Building – Grade I
- Official name: Doric Temple
- Designated: 4 January 1955
- Reference no.: 1149251

Listed Building – Grade I
- Official name: Ionic Temple
- Designated: 4 January 1955
- Reference no.: 1315950

Rievaulx Terrace is a site located in the North York Moors National Park, in North Yorkshire, England, overlooking Rievaulx Abbey, owned by the National Trust, but operated by English Heritage as a joint attraction with nearby Rievaulx Abbey. The site is a grass-covered terrace following a serpentine course across the side of a wooded escarpment overlooking the ruins of the abbey. At either end of the terrace stand two mid-18th century follies: small Palladian temples.

== History ==
The Terrace is on land that was, until the Dissolution of the Monasteries, owned by Rievaulx Abbey. It was then granted to Thomas Manners, 1st Earl of Rutland and it passed from him to the George Villiers, 1st Duke of Buckingham. On the death of his son, George Villiers, 2nd Duke of Buckingham, it was sold to Sir Charles Duncombe in 1687 and inherited by his nephew Thomas Duncombe in 1711.

The site was created in 1758 by Thomas Duncombe III who had inherited it from his father along with the adjoining Helmsley estate (now Duncombe Park) some ten years previously. His desire was to complement, and perhaps even surpass, the more formal terrace and temples laid out in about 1730 by his father at Duncombe Park house a mile away. It is thought that he may have planned to join the two terraces by a scenic drive along the River Rye.

Duncombe's descendant, Charles Duncombe, 3rd Earl of Feversham, the last earl, died in 1963. In 1972 the site and the adjoining woods were purchased by the National Trust. The site is now jointly operated by the English Heritage alongside adjacent Rievaulx Abbey, allowing visitors to only have to purchase one combined ticket.

== Tuscan Temple ==
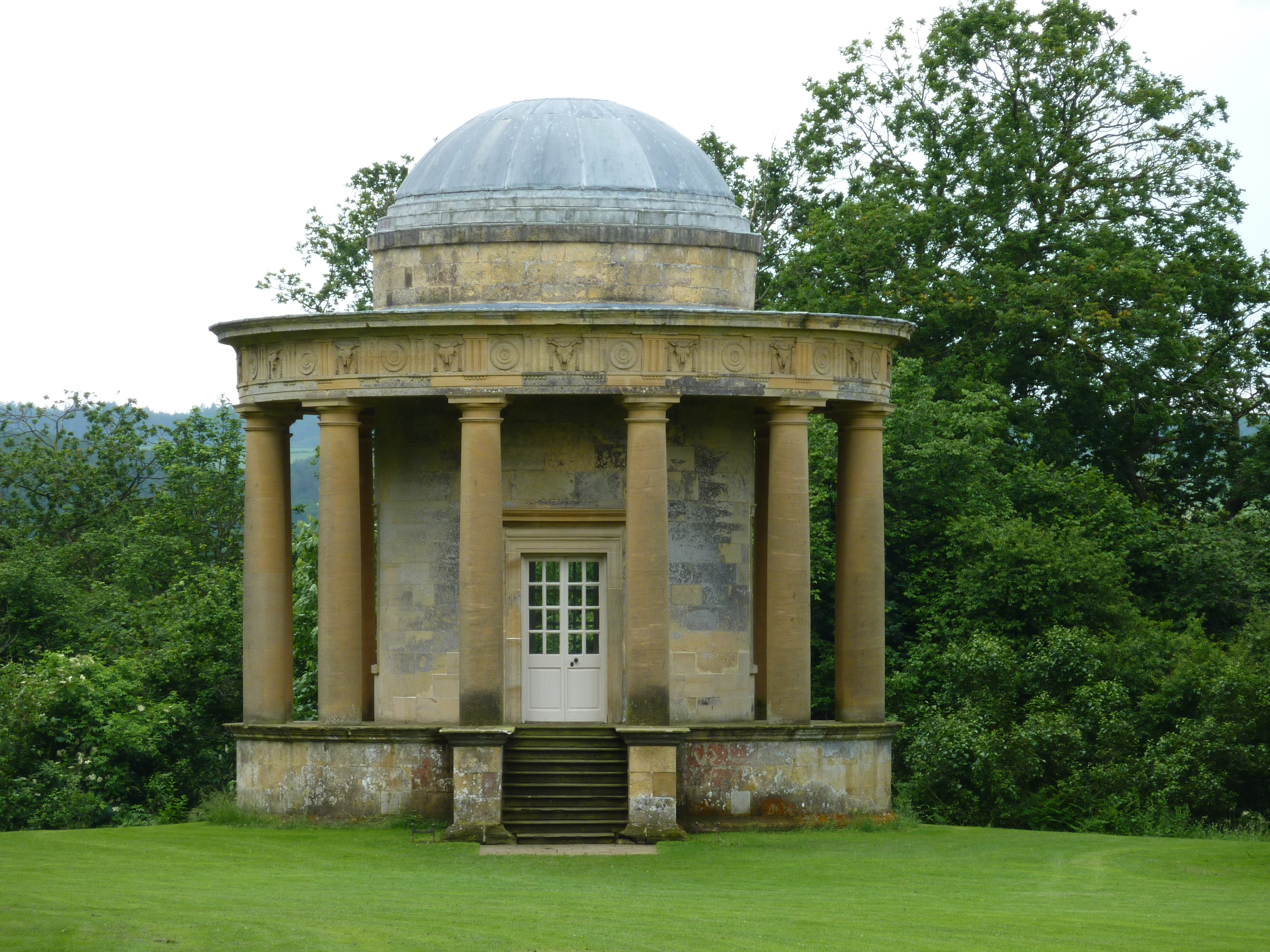
The Tuscan Temple at the southern end of Rievaulx Terrace

Two temples are on the site. At the south-east end of the terrace is the domed Doric or Tuscan Temple, thought to be a scaled-down version of The Mausoleum, Castle Howard, which is a few miles away.

The temple is built of sandstone with a lead roof. It has a circular plan with twelve baseless Doric columns on a podium. Ten steps lead up to the doorway, and there are thee round-headed sash windows. Above is a frieze with triglyphs, metopes, and paterae. The temple has a low drum and a hemispherical dome. Inside are medieval floor tiles from Rievaulx Abbey. The building is grade I listed.

== Ionic Temple ==
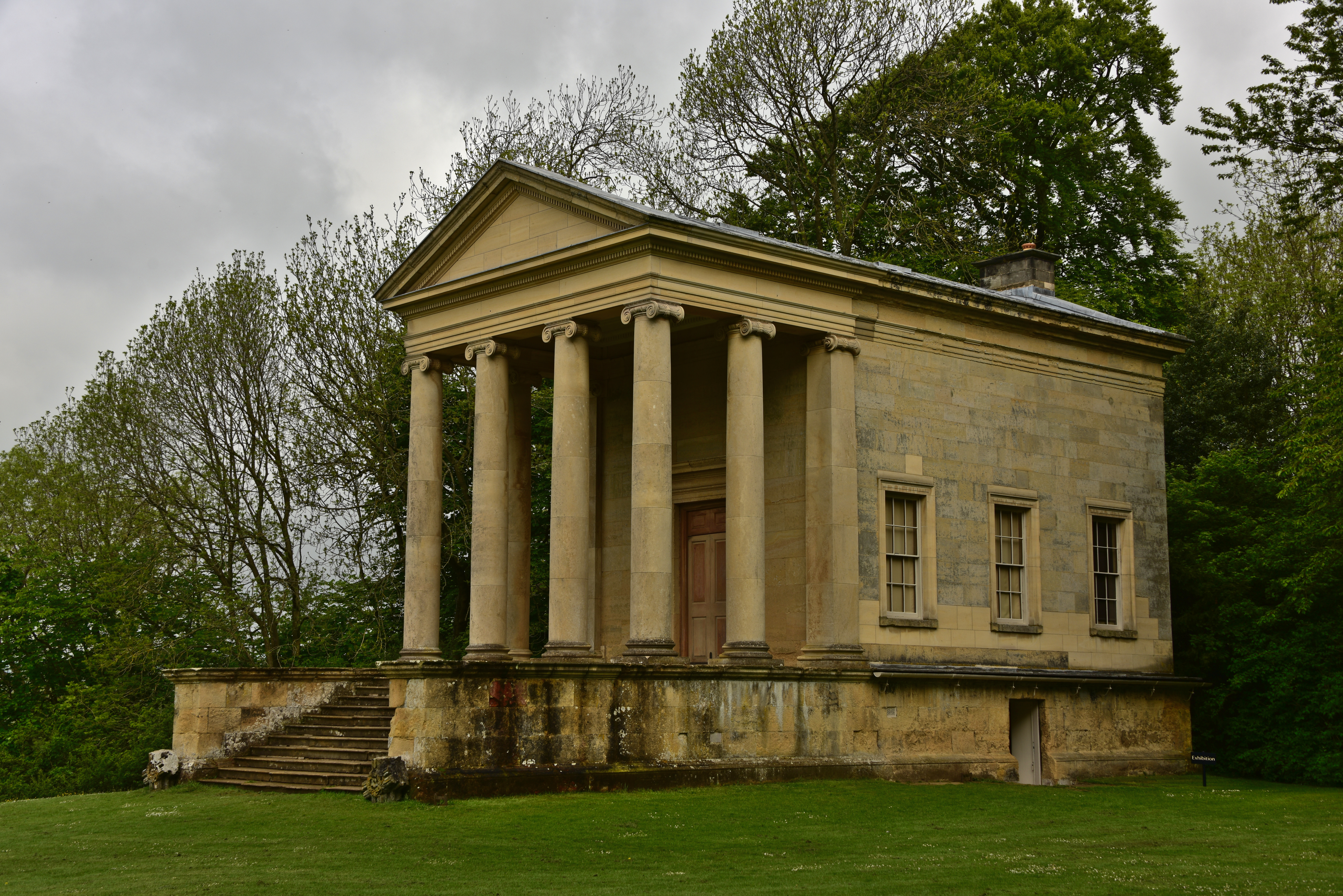
The Ionic Temple at the northern end of Rievaulx Terrace

At the opposite end stands the Ionic Temple, inspired by the Temple of Fortuna Virilis in Rome. It was intended as a banqueting house and the central table is still set as if for a meal. It is decorated with elaborate ceiling paintings and is furnished in the period style. The basement housed the kitchen and living quarters and nowadays it holds an exhibition on English landscape design in the 18th century.

The grade I-listed temple is built of limestone with a lead roof. It has a rectangular plan and a tetrastyle Ionic portico with a dentiled pediment. Twelve steps lead up the podium, and a doorway with a moulded surround.

== See also ==
- Grade I listed buildings in North Yorkshire (district)
- Listed buildings in Rievaulx
- Listed parks and gardens in Yorkshire and the Humber
