= Abbot of Rievaulx =

The Abbot of Rievaulx was the head of the Cistercian monastic community of Rievaulx Abbey, founded in 1131 by Walter l'Espec in North Yorkshire, northern England. The Abbots of Rievaulx were amongst the most powerful Christian leaders in northern England until the dissolution of the monastery by Henry VIII of England in 1538.

== List of Abbots of Rievaulx ==
- William I, 1131, died 1145
- Maurice, 1145
- Waltheof
- Ailred, 1147, 1160, 1164, died 1167
- Sylvanus, occurs 1170 (previously Abbot of Dundrennan)
- Ernald, 1192, resigned 1199 (previously Abbot of Melrose)
- William Punchard, occurs 1201–2, died 1203
- Geoffrey (or perhaps Godfrey), 1204
- Warin, occurs 1208, died 1211
- Helyas, resigned 1215
- Henry, 1215, died 1216
- William III (William de Courcy), 1216, died 1223
- Roger, 1224 to 1235, resigned 1239
- Leonias, 1239, died 1240
- Adam de Tilletai, 1240–60.
- Thomas Stangrief, occurs 1268
- William IV (de Ellerbeck), 1268–75
- William Daneby, 1275–85
- Thomas I, 1286–91
- Henry II, 1301
- Robert, 1303
- Peter, 1307
- Henry, occurs 1307
- Thomas II, 1315
- Richard, occurs 3 June 1317
- William VI, 1318
- William de Inggleby, occurs 1322
- John I, 1327
- William VIII (de Langton), 1332–4
- Richard, 1349
- John II, occurs 1363
- William IX, 1369–80
- John III, occurs 1380
- William X, 1409
- John IV, occurs 1417
- William (XI) Brymley, 1419
- Henry (III) Burton, 1423–29
- William (XII) Spenser, 1436–49
- John (V) Inkeley, 1449
- William (XIII) Spenser, 1471, 1487
- John (VI) Burton, 1489–1510
- William (XIV) Helmesley, 1513–28
- Edward Kirkby, 1530–1533
- Rowland Blyton 1533–8
