= Walter Espec =

English judge and soldier

Walter Espec (died 1155) was a prominent military and judicial figure of the reign of Henry I of England.

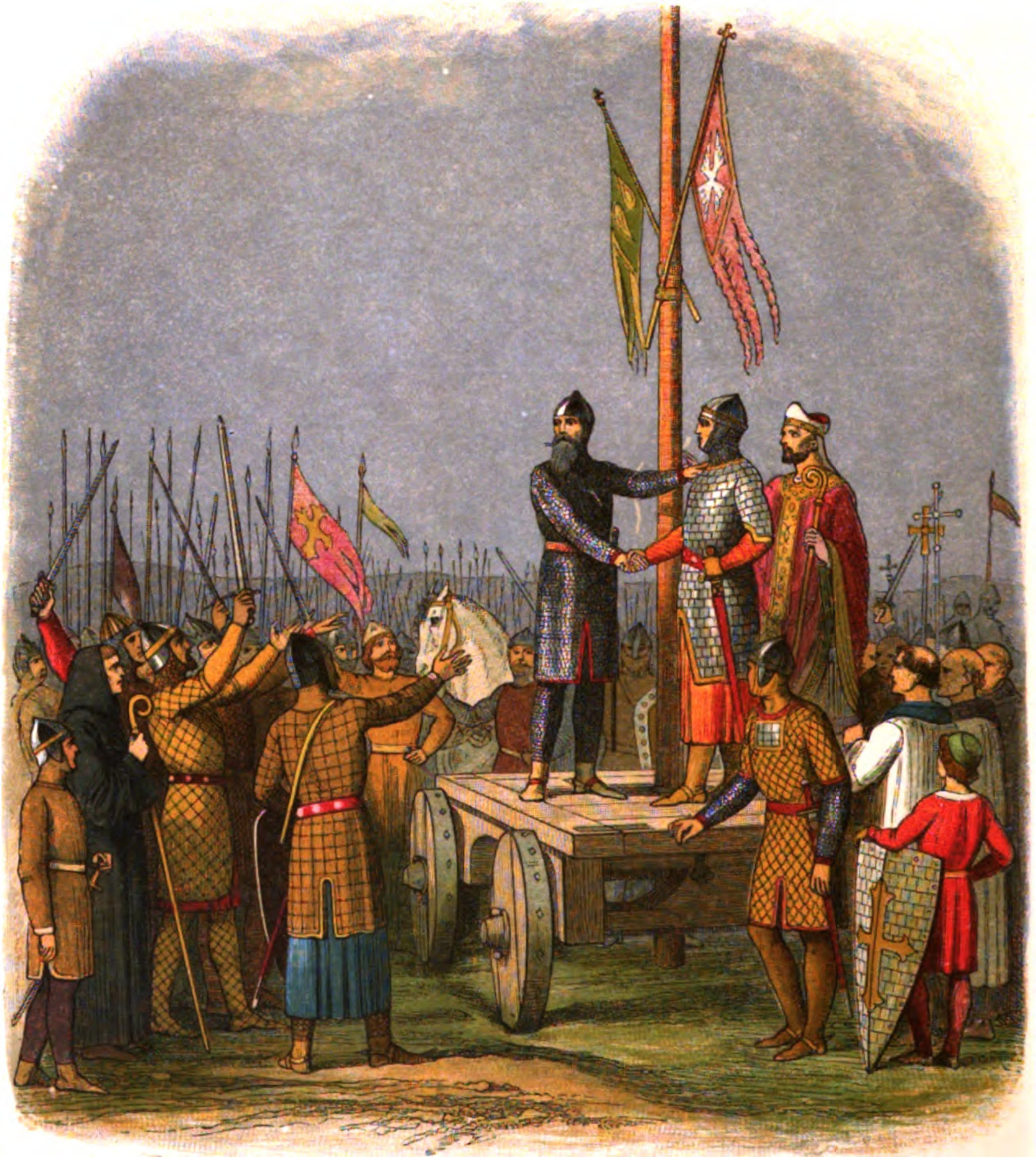
Walter Espec (left, with beard) swears to conquer or be killed by the Scots, while shaking the hand of William of Albemarle, just before the Battle of the Standard.

Espec's father was probably William Speche (William Espec), who joined William the Conqueror in the Norman conquest of England. The senior Speche is believed to have become the feudal baron of Old Warden by 1086.

In the years up to 1120, Espec controlled northern England, alongside Eustace fitz John. He was the builder of Helmsley Castle; he built also Wark Castle. As an old man, when High Sheriff of Yorkshire, he fought against the Scots at the Battle of the Standard in 1138. He was the founder of Kirkham Priory (Augustinians) and later Rievaulx Abbey (Cistercians). Kirkham Priory was founded around 1130. He then donated 1,000 acres (4 km^{2}) to Rievaulx, where building started in 1132, and is largely credited for the arrival of the Cistercians in England. By 1135 he also founded Warden Abbey (Wardon) in Bedfordshire, a daughter house of Rievaulx. Walter Espec later became a Cistercian monk himself.
