= Rievaulx Abbey =

Ruined medieval abbey in Yorkshire, England

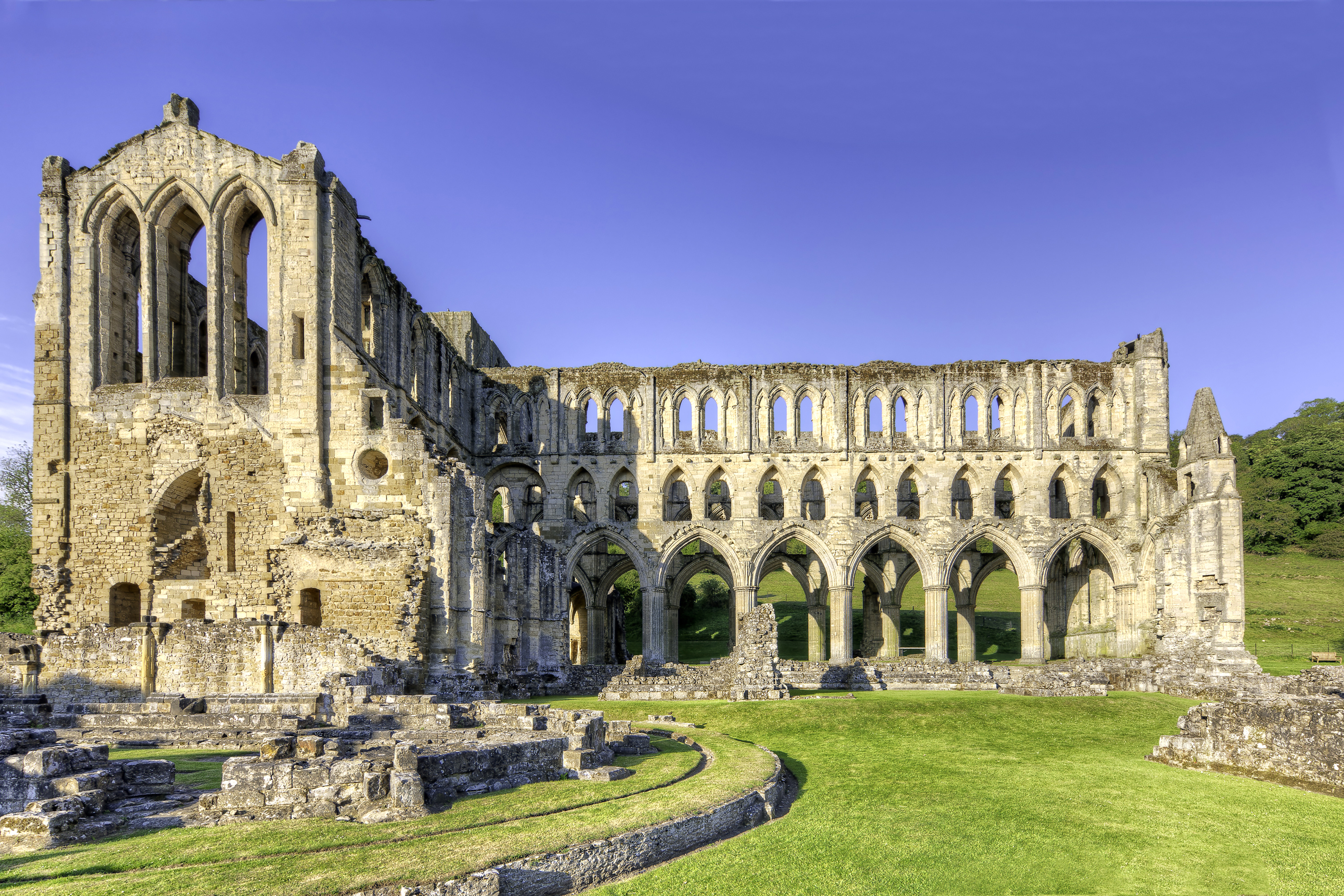

- Location within North Yorkshire

Monastery information
- Order: Cistercian
- Denomination: Catholic
- Established: 1132
- Disestablished: 1538
- Mother house: Clairvaux Abbey
- Diocese: Diocese of York

People
- Founders: Walter l'Espec and Thurstan, Archbishop of York
- Important associated figures: Aelred of Rievaulx

Site
- Location: Rievaulx, North Yorkshire, England
- Coordinates: 54°15′27″N 1°7′0″W
- Visible remains: substantial
- Public access: yes

Rievaulx Abbey (/ˈriːvoʊ/ REE-voh) was a Cistercian abbey in Rievaulx, near Helmsley, in the North York Moors National Park, North Yorkshire, England. It was one of the great monasteries in England until it was seized in 1538 under Henry VIII during the Dissolution of the Monasteries. The wider site was awarded Scheduled Ancient Monument status in 1915 and the abbey was brought into the care of the then Ministry of Works in 1917. The ruins of its main buildings are today a tourist attraction, owned and maintained by English Heritage. The Cleveland Way long distance footpath passes just to the south of the abbey.

== Foundation ==
Rievaulx Abbey was the first Cistercian monastery in the north of England, founded in 1132 by twelve monks from Clairvaux Abbey.

Its remote location was well suited to the order's ideal of a strict life of prayer and self-sufficiency with little contact with the outside world. Its patron, Walter Espec, founded another Cistercian community, that of Wardon Abbey in Bedfordshire, on unprofitable wasteland on one of his inherited estates.

William I, the first abbot of Rievaulx, started construction in the 1130s. The second abbot, Saint Aelred of Rievaulx, expanded the buildings and consolidated the existence of what in time became one of the great Cistercian abbeys of Yorkshire, with Fountains Abbey the second only Cistercian house to be built in Yorkshire. Under Aelred the abbey grew to some 140 monks and 500 lay brothers. By the end of his tenure Rievaulx had five daughter houses in England and Scotland.

== Financial prosperity ==
The abbey lies in a wooded dale by the River Rye, sheltered by hills. The monks diverted part of the river several yards to the west to have enough flat land to build on. They altered the course of the river twice more during the 12th century. The old course is visible in the grounds. This is an illustration of the technical ingenuity of the monks, who over time built up a profitable business mining lead and iron ore, rearing sheep and selling wool to buyers from all over Europe. Rievaulx became one of the greatest and wealthiest in England, with 140 monks and many more lay brothers. It received grants of land totalling 6,000 acres (2,400 ha) and established daughter houses in England and Scotland.

By the end of the 13th century the abbey had incurred debts on its building projects and lost revenue because of an epidemic of sheep scab (psoroptic mange). The ill fortune was compounded by raiders from Scotland in the early 14th century. The great reduction in population caused by the Black Death in the mid-14th century made it difficult to recruit lay brothers for manual labour. As a result the abbey was forced to lease much of its land. By 1381 there were only fourteen choir monks, three lay brothers and the abbot left at Rievaulx, and some buildings were reduced in size.

By the 15th century the Cistercian practices of strict observance according to the Rule of Saint Benedict had been abandoned in favour of a more comfortable lifestyle. The monks were permitted to eat meat, more private living accommodation was created for them and the abbot had a substantial private household in what had once been the infirmary.

== Dissolution ==
The abbey was troubling for the authorities. Edward Cowper led the monks beginning in 1530, but the monks objected to his style. He was ejected in 1533 and initially the monks refused a replacement.

At the time of its dissolution in 1538 the abbey was said to consist of 72 buildings occupied by the abbot and 21 monks, with 102 lay employees and an income of £351 a year. The abbey owned a prototype blast furnace at Laskill, producing cast iron as efficiently as a modern blast furnace.

As was standard, the confiscated monastic buildings were rendered uninhabitable and stripped of valuables such as lead. The site was granted to Thomas Manners, 1st Earl of Rutland, one of Henry's advisers, until it passed to the Duncombe family.

== Post-monastic era ==
In the later 16th and 17th centuries Rievaulx was an important iron-manufacturing site.

In the 1750s its owner, Thomas Duncombe III, beautified his estate by building a terraced walk along the valley top overlooking the abbey from where the picturesque qualities of the ruins and the wider landscape could be enjoyed. It features two Grecian-style temples. They are in the care of the National Trust. The abbey ruins are in the care of English Heritage.

In the 1920s, its owner donated lead that had been stripped from its windows after the Dissolution and stored away, for the restoration of York Minster's Five Sisters window, which had been removed for safety during the First World War.

In the 20th century the abbey became a historic monument in the care of the state and is now managed by English Heritage.

In 2015, Historic England commissioned an archaeological survey and investigation of the abbey precinct using low-level aerial photography to make a digital surface model and an earthwork plan. This was followed by a ground-based survey in 2018. The aim was to develop a better understanding of the landscape surrounding the abbey and was published in 2019.

When awarded a life peerage in 1983, former prime minister Harold Wilson, a Yorkshireman, adopted the title Baron Wilson of Rievaulx.

== Burials ==
- Aelred of Rievaulx
- Thomas de Ros, 4th Baron de Ros
- John de Ros, 5th Baron de Ros

== Gallery ==
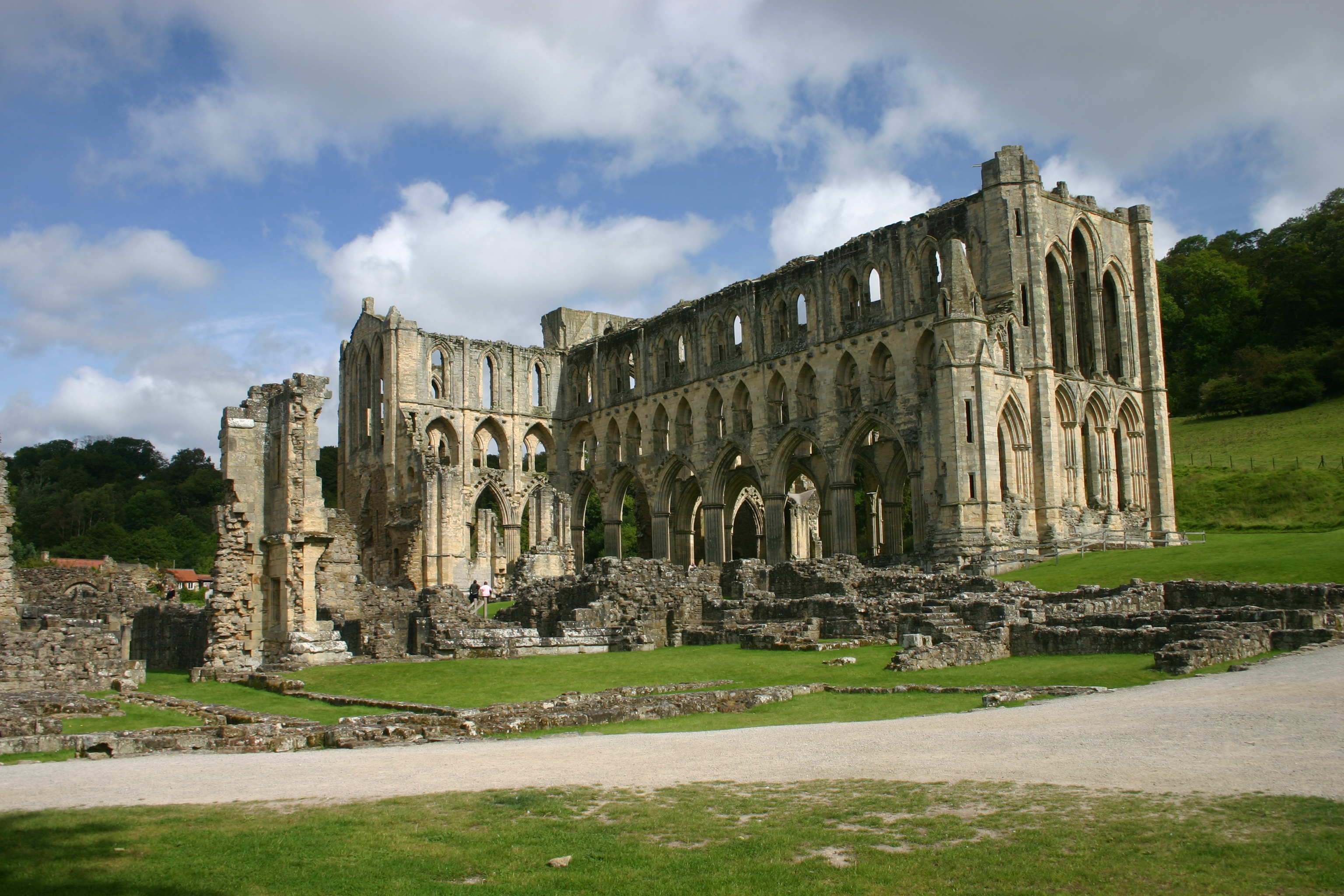
Rievaulx Abbey

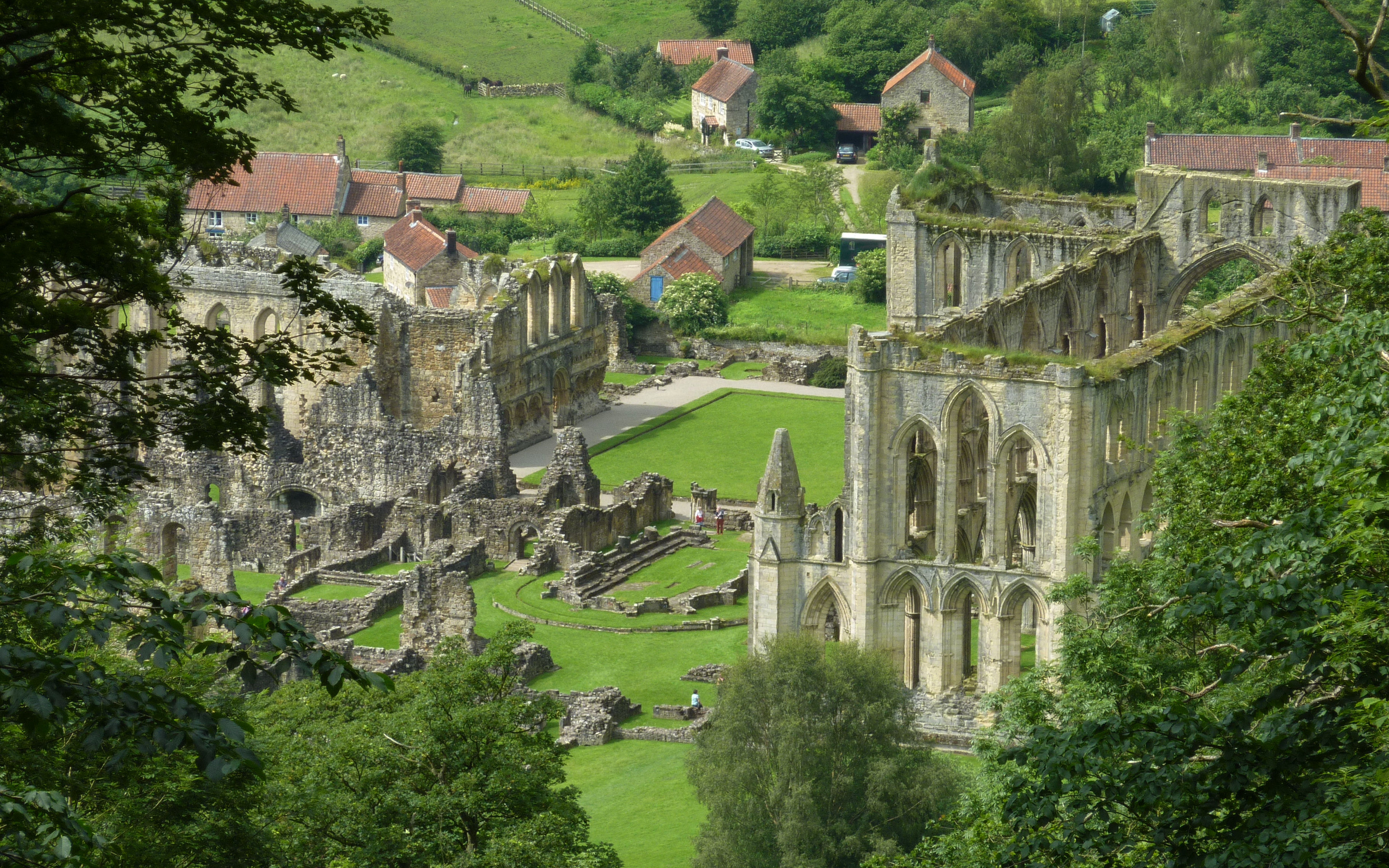
Rievaulx Abbey viewed from Rievaulx Terrace (NT)

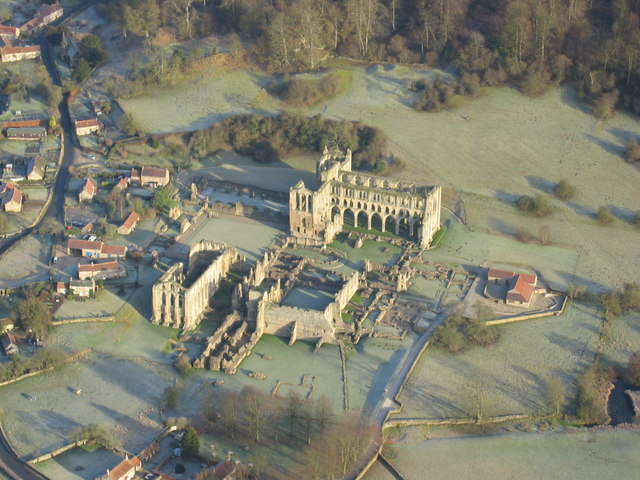
Rievaulx Abbey

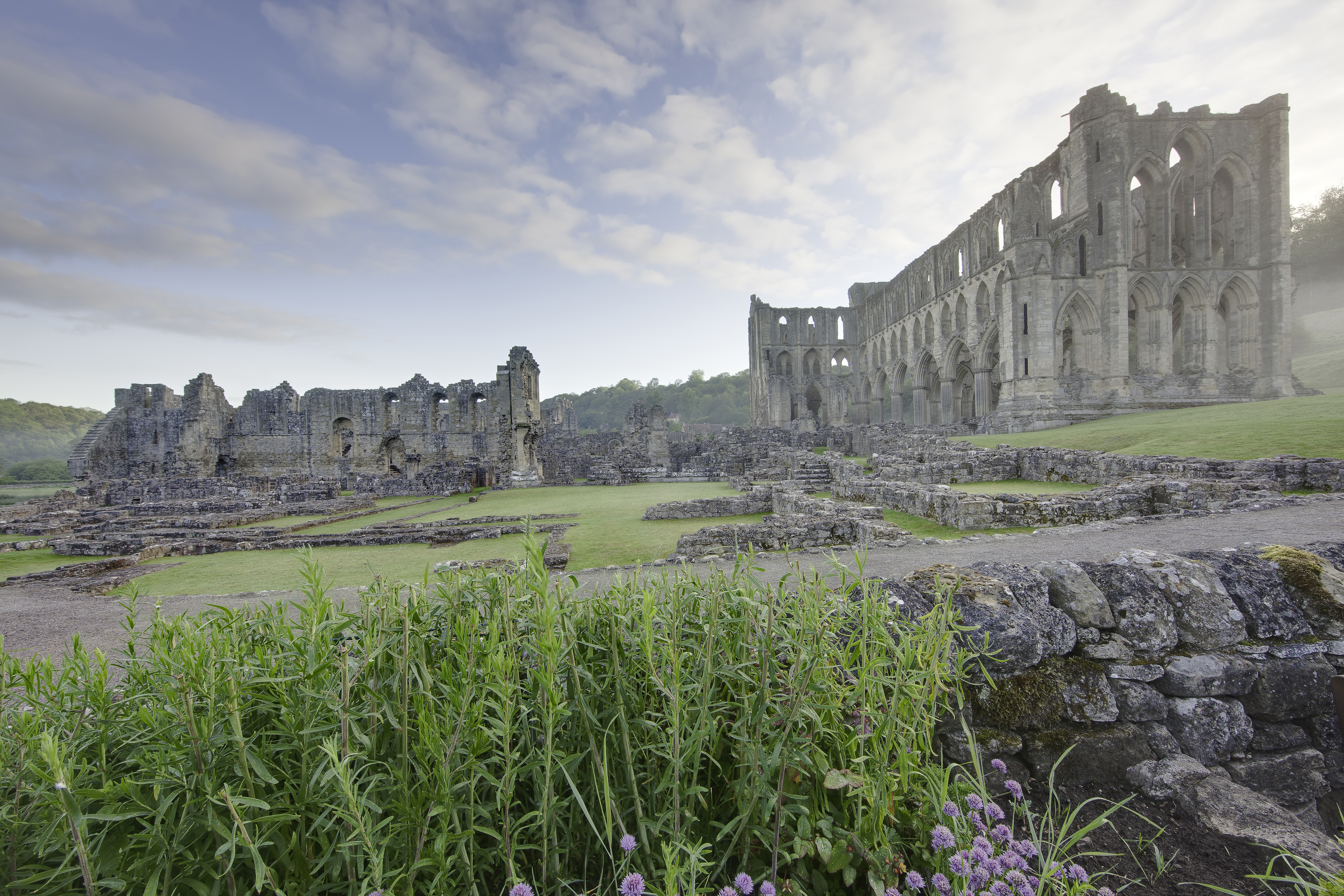
Rievaulx Abbey showing Presbytery (R), South Transept, Chapter House foundations & wall of Infirmary (L)

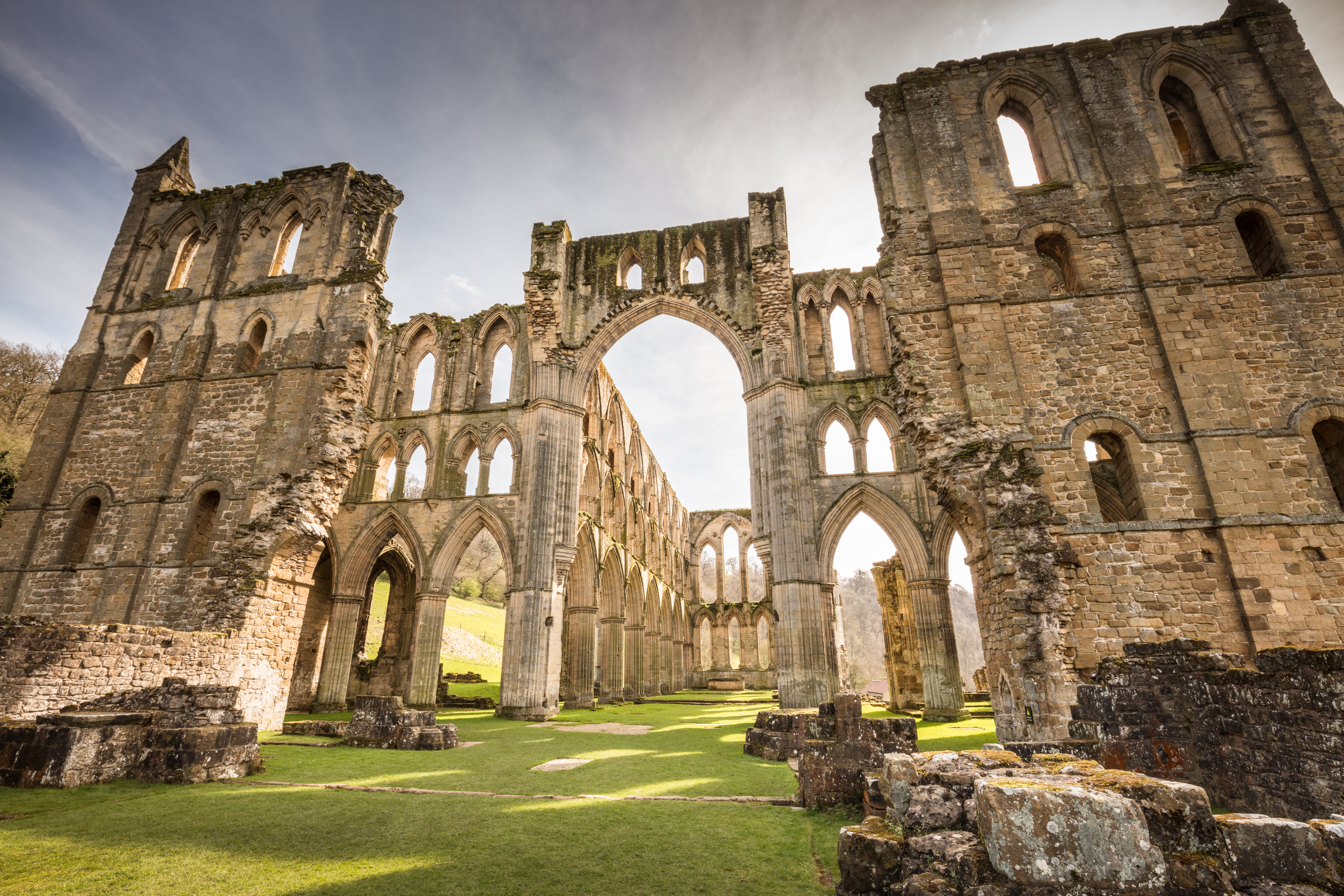
View looking south-southeast through the nave of the abbey church

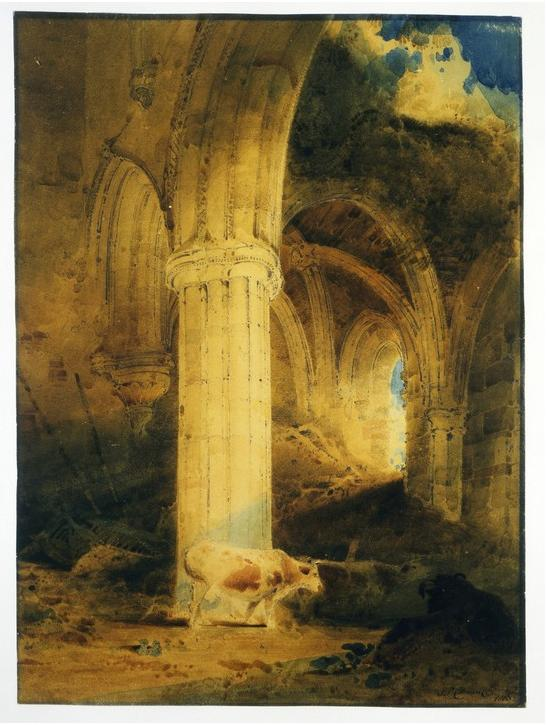
Ruins of Rievaulx Abbey, 1803, by John Sell Cotman

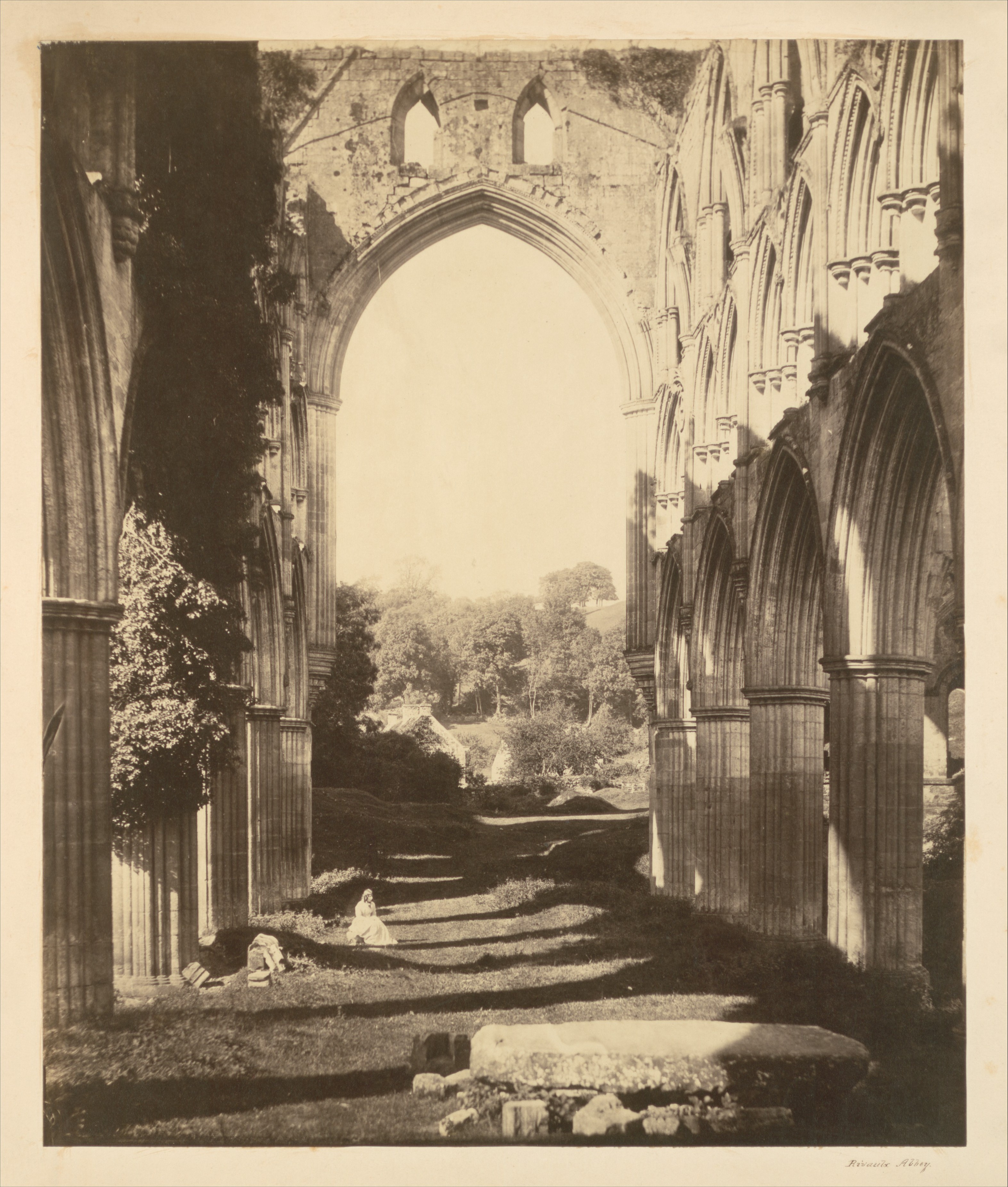
Ruins of Rievaulx Abbey nave, 1854, by Roger Fenton

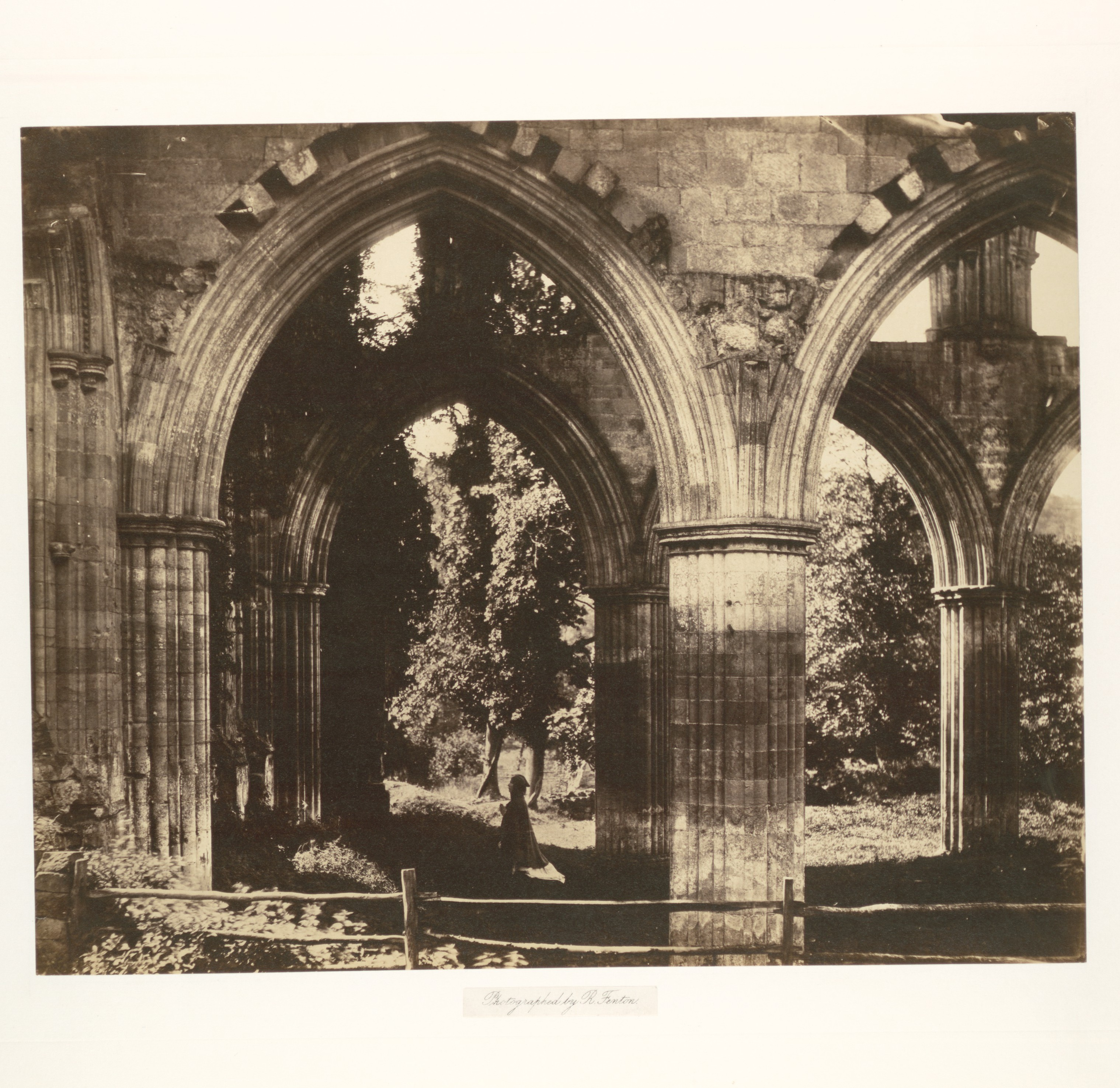
Ruins of Rievaulx Abbey high altar, 1854, by Roger Fenton

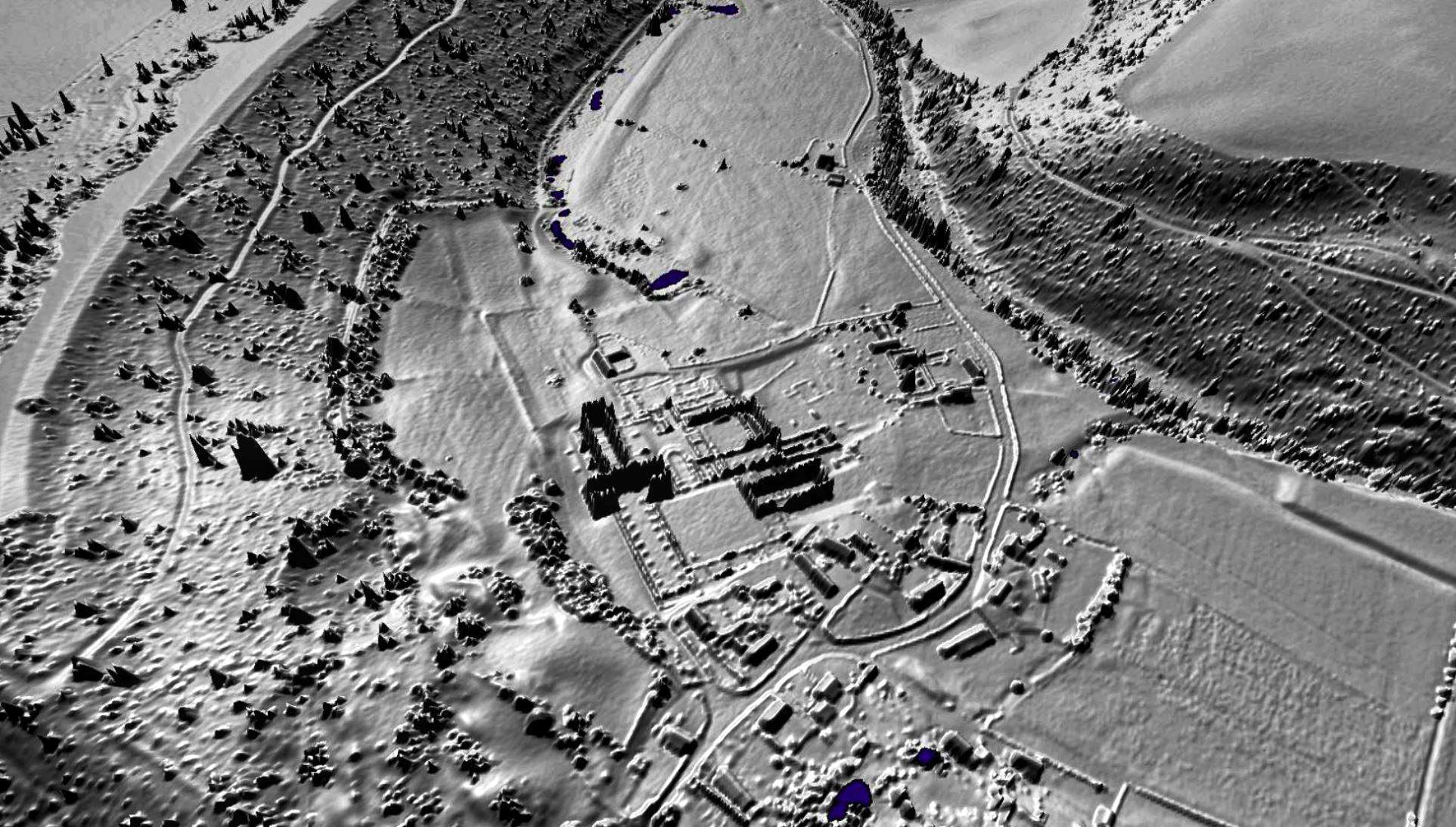
A lidar view of Rievaulx Abbey

== See also ==
- Abbot of Rievaulx
- List of monastic houses in North Yorkshire
- Grade I listed buildings in North Yorkshire (district)
- Listed buildings in Rievaulx
