= Whateley Hall =

Coordinates: 52.5043°N 1.7747°W

Whateley Hall (not to be confused with Whately Hall in Banbury) was a stately home in the Warwickshire countryside near Castle Bromwich. The owners of the house were the Newtons of Glencripesdale Estate, who also owned Barrells Hall.

Whateley Hall was demolished in 1935, and a housing estate was built on the grounds.

== History ==
The house comprised three main levels and was built in the classical Palladian style with pilasters and pediment. The architect of the house and its date are unknown, as very little documentation exists regarding it.

In 1851, William Newton II was living in the house with his wife Mary Whincopp and their children Goodwin Newton, William Newton III, Canon Horace Newton, and Mary Rosa (who later married Henry Cheetham, Bishop of Sierra Leone). The Newtons were a wealthy family who owned whole streets of commercial property in Birmingham, including part of New Street, as well as welsh slate quarries and mines in Llanberis via the Llanberis Slate Company. In 1856, the Newtons purchased Barrells Hall near Henley-in-Arden, which then became the family's main residence. However, the second son of the family, William Newton III, vicar of Rotherham, remained at Whateley Hall. Other properties owned by the family included their 26,000-acre (11,000 ha) estate in Scotland, Glencripesdale House, and the house of Canon Horace Newton in Holmwood, Redditch, designed for him by the architect Temple Lushington Moore.

Following the death of William Newton III in 1879, Whateley Hall was sold in 1881 to the Knight family, local printers. The house sold again to Fred Hayles & Co of Castle Bromwich in 1935 and was demolished, becoming the site of the Whateley Hall housing estate. All that remains of the Neo-Palladian house is the Lodge on the edge of Whateley Green.
