= Goodwin Newton =

English landowner and company director

(Thomas Henry) Goodwin Newton (1835–1907) was an English landowner, company director and magistrate. He was the chairman of Imperial Continental Gas Association.

== Early years ==
The eldest son of William Newton II of Whateley Hall near Castle Bromwich and Barrells Hall at Ullenhall near Henley-in-Arden in Warwickshire, Goodwin Newton was born on 29 March 1836 in Birmingham; he was the elder brother of Horace Newton. He matriculated at St John's College, Cambridge in 1854, graduating B.A. in 1858, M.A. in 1861. He was admitted to the Middle Temple in 1858, and was called to the bar there in 1861.

== Property owner ==
On the death of his father William II in 1862, Goodwin Newton inherited Barrells Hall and became Lord of the manor of Ullenhall. Before William II had purchased Barrells Hall in 1856, the family seat was Whateley Hall, Castle Bromwich. Newton gave up on the law and politics, for a life as country gentleman and landowner.

Newton and his brothers inherited a family fortune that came in part from Welsh slate quarries on an estate near Llanberis, including Bryn Bras Castle; as well as freehold land in Birmingham, with large portions of New Street, and many ground rents. A reference in 1904 was made to a "quite absurdly large fortune". In his obituary from 1907 The Times stated that Newton was one of the largest owners of freehold property in Birmingham.

=== Scottish estates ===
With his brothers Horace and William, Goodwin Newton bought and expanded the Glencripesdale Estate on Loch Sunart, Argyll, Scotland. Goodwin and Horace owned it jointly in 1883. The elements at Morvern parish were originally land owned by the Campbell Dukes of Argyll; the land was sold in 1821 into the Stewart family, and after the detached Beach portion was sold separately in 1869, the three Newton brothers bought the rest in 1871, from the trustees of Alexander Stewart. The same year they added to the estate other land (Laudale, Liddesdale), applying the Glencripesdale name to the whole new estate. Their acquisitions included the Isle of Càrna and Rahoy, and resulted in a property of up to 41 square miles (110 km^{2}), and 20 miles (32 km) of the southern shore of Loch Sunart.

== Positions held and Lord of the manor ==
Newton was chairman of Imperial Continental Gas Association, now known as Calor Gas, for a long period during the late 19th century. He was also chairman of the Llanberis Slate Company which comprised three quarries: Cefn Du Quarry, the Goodman Quarry and the Cambrian Quarry

A magistrate for Warwickshire, Newton in 1887 was High Sheriff of Warwickshire. It was the Golden Jubilee year for Queen Victoria, and he was invited to Windsor Castle for a celebration with the other High Sheriffs from around the country. He was a founder member of the Warwickshire County Council. He was Lord of the manors of Ullenhall and also Aspleigh, both in Warwickshire, and also Oldberrow in Worcestershire, titles which he inherited from his father.

== Philanthropy ==
During his lifetime he became famous for his philanthropy, giving away millions of pounds in today's money, and building hospitals, schools, theatres, churches and donating to various charities with the support of his brother Horace Newton.

== Family ==
Newton was married three times:

1. In 1861, to Mary Jane Berrow, daughter of William Berrow of Milverton.
2. In 1865, to Matilda Mackrell, daughter of William Thomas Mackrell of Wandsworth.
3. In 1898, to Alice Maude Eyre, daughter of John Eyre (1820–1890) of Eyre Court, County Galway, whose first husband was John Blair-Miller (died 1889) of the 8th Hussars.

Goodwin Newton was survived by three sons and six daughters, the issue of his second marriage. Of the sons:

- Hugh Goodwin Newton (–1924) married in 1903 Adelaide Grace Whitehouse, eldest daughter of James Hemming Whitehouse of Ipsley Court.
- Mark Goodwin Newton RN, second son (died 1933 aged 56), married in 1905 Florence Evelyn Warrington-Morris, daughter of John Warrington-Morris.
- Horace William Goodwin Newton (1882–1916), educated at Winchester College, graduated B.A. at King's College, Cambridge in 1905. He was killed in action on World War I. From 1905 he worked for Douglas Fox & Partners.

Of the daughters:

- Maud Sybil died unmarried in 1935. An Anglican deaconess, she became head deaconess at the Rochester Diocesan Deaconesses' Institution.
- Hilda Christine married in 1909 the Rev. James Percy Lax Amos, a Durham University theology graduate in 1896.
- Joyce Gwendolen, died 1947 unmarried.
- Olive Muriel, youngest daughter, married in 1908 the Rev. Morley Lewis Caulfield Headlam, who graduated B.A. at All Souls College, Oxford in 1893.

The other daughters were Ellen and Mary.
