= List of new churches by Temple Moore =

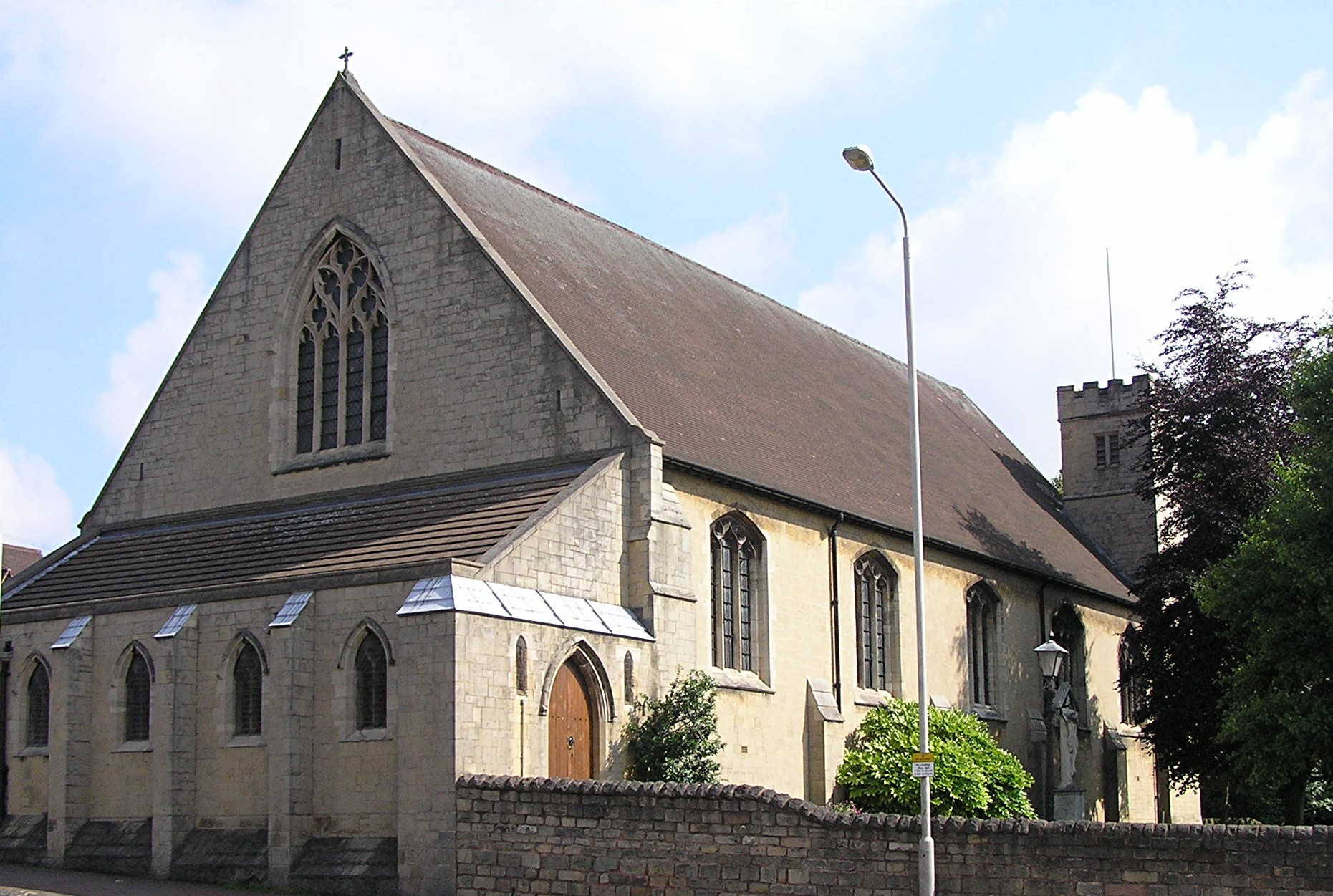
St Mark's Church, Mansfield

Temple Moore (1856–1920) was an English architect who practised from an office in London. He was born in Tullamore, Ireland, the son of an army officer. He was educated at Glasgow High School, and later privately. In 1875 he was articled to George Gilbert Scott, Jr. Moore established an independent practice in 1878, but continued to work with Scott for some years and completed a number of his commissions.

Moore's designs were mainly in the Gothic Revival style, and although he worked in the later years of that tradition, his "artistic destiny was not to preserve an attenuating tradition but to bring to maturity a development which otherwise would have remained incomplete". Moore was primarily a church architect, designing around 40 new churches and restoring or making alterations and additions to others. He also designed a range of other buildings, including country houses, memorials, schools, parish halls, and a hospital. One of his pupils was Giles Gilbert Scott.

In 1919 Moore's son-in-law, Leslie Moore, became a partner, and he continued the work of the practice after Temple Moore's death at his home in Hampstead in 1920.

This list includes the major new churches designed by Temple Moore: the listed churches recorded in the National Heritage List for England, together with his cathedral in Nairobi, Kenya.

== Key ==
Grade	Criteria
Grade I	Buildings of exceptional interest, sometimes considered to be internationally important.
Grade II*	Particularly important buildings of more than special interest.
Grade II	Buildings of national importance and special interest.

== Churches ==
Name	Location	Photograph	Date	Notes	Grade
St Aidan	Carlton, Helmsley, North Yorkshire; 54.2721°N 1.0645°W		1884–1887	New church.	II*
All Saints	Peterborough, Cambridgeshire; 52.5848°N 0.2387°W		1886–87	The chancel and two bays of the nave were built in 1886–87, the nave was completed in 1891, and the tower in 1901.	II*
Chapel of Rest	Brompton, Scarborough, North Yorkshire; 54.2221°N 0.5506°W		1889	A chapel of rest for the new cemetery.	II
The Good Shepherd	Lake, Isle of Wight; 50.6464°N 1.1682°W		1892	A church with a double nave and bellcote in Decorated style.	II
St Magnus	Bessingby, East Riding of Yorkshire; 54.0764°N 0.2301°W		1893–94	A new church replacing one of 1767 in Decorated style.	II*
St Peter	Barnsley, South Yorkshire; 53.5484°N 1.4718°W	—	1893–1910	A new church in brick with ashlar dressings.	II*
St John	Hendon, Greater London; 51.5788°N 0.2361°W		1895	The church was never completed, and consists only of the nave and the south aisle.	II
St Botolph	Carlton-in-Cleveland, North Yorkshire; 54.4338°N 1.2203°W		1896	A new church with a west tower.	II
St John the Evangelist	Bilsdale Midcable, North Yorkshire; 54.3436°N 1.1191°W		1896–1898	A church in an isolated condition in Decorated style.	II
St Mark	Mansfield, Nottinghamshire; 53.1385°N 1.1977°W		1897	A new church in Perpendicular style.	II*
St Cuthbert	Middlesbrough, North Yorkshire; 54.5694°N 1.2578°W	—	1897–1902	A new church, converted into a leisure centre in 1977.	II
St Mary	Sledmere, East Riding of Yorkshire; 54.0685°N 0.5804°W		1898	A new church incorporating some ancient fabric for Sir Tatton Sykes, 5th baronet, in the grounds of his home, Sledmere House.	II*
St Columba	Middlesbrough, North Yorkshire; 54.5781°N 1.2413°W		1900–1902	A church designed to fit an awkward site; in brick with a few stone dressings.	II
St James the Greater	Lealholm, North Yorkshire; 54.4587°N 0.8242°W		1902	A new church.	II*
St Wilfrid	Harrogate, North Yorkshire; 53.9952°N 1.5529°W		1904	Started by Temple Moore, extended and completed later.	I
St Wilfrid	Bradford, West Yorkshire; 53.7862°N 1.7899°W		1904–05	New church; furnishings added later.	II
St Mary	Rievaulx, North Yorkshire; 54.2592°N 1.1156°W		1906	A new church, incorporating 13th-century fabric from an older church, with a north tower.	II
All Saints	Tooting, Wandsworth, Greater London; 51.4304°N 0.1574°W		1906	A new church.	II
St Luke	Eltham, Greenwich, Greater London; 51.4606°N 0.0585°E		1906–07	New church replacing a temporary mission church.	II
Chapel	Bishop's Hostel, Lincoln; 53.2336°N 0.5392°W		1906–07	The building was later used as a theological college, and subsequently renamed Chad Varah House.	II
All Saints	Stroud, Gloucestershire; 51.7497°N 2.2096°W		1907–1910	The nave, chancel, and aisles were built at this time. It was later completed to Temple Moore's designs by Leslie Moore.	I
St Margaret	Leeds, West Yorkshire; 53.8099°N 1.5742°W		1908–09	A new church, never finished. Now redundant and used as an arts centre, the Left Bank Centre.	II*
St Anne	Royton, Oldham, Greater Manchester; 53.5600°N 2.1224°W		1908–09	A new church. The tower was added to Temple Moore's design in 1926–27.	II*
St Wilfrid's Priory (Hostel of the Resurrection)	Leeds, West Yorkshire; 53.8048°N 1.5590°W		1908–1928	Built for the Community of the Resurrection in Tudor style. Later used as an adult education centre for the University of Leeds.	II*
St Thomas	Boston, Lincolnshire; 52.9652°N 0.0293°W		1911	New church.	II
St Mary, St Giles and All Saints	Canwell, Hints, Staffordshire; 52.6023°N 1.7932°W		1911	A new chapel of ease.	II*
All Saints	Chalfont St Peter, Buckinghamshire; 51.5954°N 0.5568°W	—	1912	A larger church was planned, but only the north aisle was completed; it is in Art Nouveau style.	II
St James	Clacton-on-Sea, Essex; 51.7872°N 1.1481°E		1912–13	A church in Perpendicular style, but never completed.	II*
St Michael and All Angels	Stockton-on-Tees, County Durham; 54.5817°N 1.3097°W	—	1913	A new church in brick with stone dressings and a west tower.	II*
St Aidan	Rochdale, Greater Manchester; 53.6013°N 2.1779°W		1913–1915	A new church in Early English style.	II*
St Mary	Walesby, Lincolnshire; 53.4153°N 0.2969°W		1914	A new church with a west tower.	II*
All Saints	Basingstoke, Hampshire; 51.2607°N 1.0884°W		1915	New church in mainly Perpendicular style.	II
St Mary	Sculthorpes, Kingston upon Hull, East Riding of Yorkshire; 53.7615°N 0.3446°W		1916–1920	A new church incorporating columns from a church dating from about 1760.	II
All Saints' Cathedral	Nairobi, Kenya	—	1917–18	The Anglican cathedral.	—
St Mary	Nunthorpe, North Yorkshire; 54.5187°N 1.1670°W		1924–1926	Designed with Leslie T. Moore, his son-in-law, in Early English style.	II
St Columba	Scarborough, North Yorkshire; 54.2859°N 0.4101°W		1926	New church built after his death.	II*

== See also ==
- List of church restorations and alterations by Temple Moore
- List of church fittings and furniture by Temple Moore
- List of miscellaneous works by Temple Moore
