= Imperial Continental Gas Association =

Imperial Continental Gas plc
- Industry: Gas
- Founded: 1824
- Defunct: 1987
- Fate: Broke up into Calor Gas and Contibel
- Successor: Calor Group; Tractebel
- Headquarters: London, UK
- Parent: Charterland and General Exploration and Finance

Imperial Continental Gas Association plc was a leading British gas utility operating in various cities in continental Europe. It was listed on the London Stock Exchange and was a constituent of the FTSE 100 Index.

== History ==
Imperial Continental Gas Association Act 1833
- Act of Parliament
- Parliament of the United Kingdom
- Long title: An Act for granting certain Powers to a Company called "The Imperial Continental Gas Association."
- Citation: 3 & 4 Will. 4. c. lxiii

Dates
- Royal assent: 10 June 1833
Other legislation
Repealed by	Imperial Continental Gas Association Act 1853

Status: Repealed

Text of statute as originally enacted

Imperial Continental Gas Association Act 1847
- Act of Parliament
- Parliament of the United Kingdom
- Long title: An Act for extending the Powers of the Imperial Continental Gas Association.
- Citation: 10 & 11 Vict. c. xliii

Dates
- Royal assent: 21 June 1847
Other legislation
Repealed by	Imperial Continental Gas Association Act 1853

Status: Repealed

Imperial Continental Gas Association Act 1853
- Act of Parliament
- Parliament of the United Kingdom
- Long title: An Act for consolidating and amending the Powers of the Acts of "The Imperial Continental Gas Association."
- Citation: 16 & 17 Vict. c. cxc

Dates
- Royal assent: 15 August 1853
Other legislation
Repeals/revokes	Imperial Continental Gas Association Act 1833
Repealed by	Imperial Continental Gas Association Act 1870

Status: Repealed

Text of statute as originally enacted

Imperial Continental Gas Association Act 1870
- Act of Parliament
- Parliament of the United Kingdom
- Long title: An Act for granting further powers to the Imperial Continental Gas Association.
- Citation: 33 & 34 Vict. c. lxx

Dates
- Royal assent: 20 June 1870
Other legislation
Repeals/revokes	Imperial Continental Gas Association Act 1853
Repealed by	Imperial Continental Gas Association Act 1929

Text of statute as originally enacted

Imperial Continental Gas Association Act 1878
- Act of Parliament
- Parliament of the United Kingdom
- Long title: An Act for granting further powers to the Imperial Continental Gas Association.
- Citation: 41 & 42 Vict. c. xvii

Dates
- Royal assent: 16 April 1878
Other legislation
Repealed by	Imperial Continental Gas Association Act 1929

Status: Repealed

Text of statute as originally enacted

Imperial Continental Gas Association Act 1929
- Act of Parliament
- Parliament of the United Kingdom
- Long title: An Act to confer further powers on the Imperial Continental Gas Association to repeal and re-enact with amendments the provisions of the several Acts governing the Association and for other purposes.
- Citation: 19 & 20 Geo. 5. c. lxxxix

Dates
- Royal assent: 10 May 1929
Other legislation
Repeals/revokes	Imperial Continental Gas Association Act 1870; Imperial Continental Gas Association Act 1878

Text of statute as originally enacted

The company was formed by Sir Moses Montefiore and some of his colleagues based in London in 1824 as the Imperial Continental Gas Association to establish gas utilities in other counties. It commenced operations distributing gas in Hannover in 1825 and providing gas lighting in Berlin in 1826. During the course of the nineteenth century it established gas works in Antwerp, Brussels, Berlin and Vienna. Its operations in Vienna began in the mid-1840s; the head office from 1883 to 1902 was at the Palais Epstein.

Sir William Congreve, 2nd Baronet, was general manager from 1824. The noted philanthropist Goodwin Newton of Barrells Hall and Glencripesdale Estate was director and chairman for a long period in the late nineteenth century. In the early twentieth century, Sir Henry Birchenough, the future president of the British South Africa Company, also served as a director of the company.

It established the Westergasfabriek gas works in Amsterdam in 1883.

In 1928 it established Distrigas, the main gas distributor in Belgium, which is now owned by Eni. During World War I its operations in Berlin were nationalised by the German government.

In 1969 the company acquired all the shares in Calor Group that it did not already own.

In 1986 it rejected a bid from Gulf Resources & Chemical Corporation, a company controlled by the Barclay brothers. Instead in 1987 it broke itself up into Calor Group (now owned by SHV) and Contibel (now owned by Tractebel).
