= Càrna =

Island in Loch Sunart, Scotland

Carna
Càrna (Gaelic)
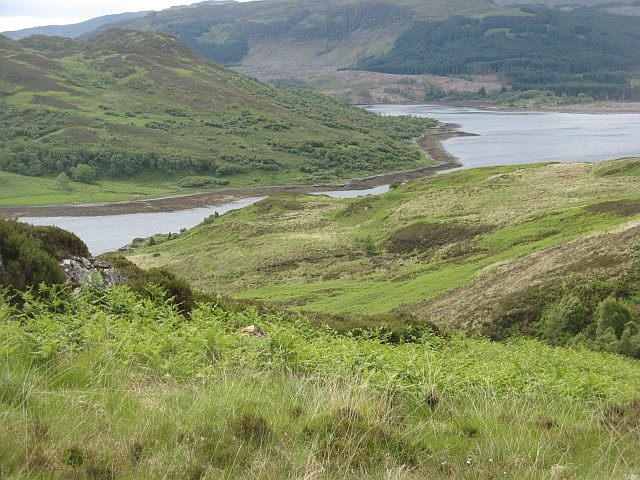
- The southeast of Carna looking towards Loch Teacuis and Morvern

Location
- Càrna shown within Highland
- OS grid reference: NM620590
- Coordinates: 56.66°N 5.88°W

Name
- Gaelic pronunciation: [ˈkʰaːrˠn̪ˠə]
- Name meaning: possibly cairn island

Physical geography
- Island group: Inner Hebrides
- Area: 213 ha (13/16 sq mi)
- Area rank: 104
- Highest elevation: Cruachan Chàrna, 169 m (554 ft)

Administration
- Council area: Highland
- Country: Scotland
- Sovereign state: United Kingdom

Demographics
- Population: 0

Carna or Càrna is an island in Loch Sunart, an arm of the sea, close to the Ardnamurchan peninsula, on the west coast of Scotland.

== Geography ==
Carna lies wedged across the mouth of Loch Teacuis in the middle of Loch Sunart, forming two narrow kyles which provide some of the trickiest rock-dodging for yachtsmen anywhere on the west coast. Moine schist bedrock of quartz-feldspar constitution, with mixed schists and mica schists in a west coastal strip. A north–south ridge divides the island in two. From the heather covered rocky peak of Cruachan Chàrna, there are extensive views over Oronsay, Loch Sunart, Morvern, Coll and Isle of Mull.

== Wildlife ==
Carna contains a wide variety of habitats that support a large range of native wildlife species including otters, sea and golden eagles, orchids, harbour seals, Arctic terns, foxes, red deer, water shrews, woodpeckers, cuckoos, herons, curlews and kestrels. The island's habitats include wild flower meadows, native Atlantic Oakwood and Scots Pine woodlands, hill grazing, heather moorland and wetland habitats which is a diverse selection for a small island and helps support a wide biodiversity.

Scotland hosts the only populations of European wildcat (sub-species Felis sylvestris grampia) in the British Isles, with numbers estimated at between 400 and 2,000 animals. In 2013 it was announced that the island of Càrna is to provide a sanctuary and breeding station in order to protect the threatened species.

In 2014 Carna Conservation Initiative was formed by the owners with local business Ardnamurchan Marine Centre to enhance and protect the islands wildlife and habitats, improve the islands economic and environmental sustainability and benefit the local community and economy. The initiative includes a range of conservation projects including restoring ancient wild flower meadows, recreating native woodlands, establishing colonies of native dark honeybees, removing invasive non-native species and taking part in the monitoring of Loch Sunart Marine Protected Area (MPA) which surrounds the island.

== Economy and history ==
Carna is thought to be more fertile than its neighbour, Oronsay, and due to its much greater aspect has better water sources. There are signs of terracing by early man and the northern part of the island is named Bac a' Mhathachaidh (Scottish Gaelic: "cultivated bank"). The island has a clear "in-bye" area of around 20 hectares (50 acres), which has been improved over hundreds of years for farming by drainage into an ancient 'Head dyke' and the cultivation of fields for haymaking and growing crops. This area surrounds the once main township of Dailachreagain (Scottish Gaelic: "rocky meadow") which once had around 20 dwellings. There is also the remains of a tidal fish trap in one of the bays on the eastern side of the island and at various points around the shore can be seen bait holes where inhabitants would have pounded their fish bait.

Originally forming part of the Kingdom of Dal Riata, and later the Lordship of The Isles, the island was a strategic hub and used as a clan gathering site on a number of occasions. The MacDonalds were gathered on Carna by Donald Balloch in 1431 prior to the Battle of Inverlochy where they were on the winning side against the Scottish Crown. Later in 1543 the last remaining claimant to the Lordship of the Isles, Donald Dubh, led his final insurrection from Carna before dying a short time later. With the full decline of the Lordship by 1493 the Island then passed to the Duke of Argyll until it was sold off in the 19th century.

In common with many Scottish islands the population has declined since the 19th century. At one point up to 18 families lived there but by 1881 the population was seven. In 1891 it was recorded as ten but this had dropped to only two in 1961. No permanent population was recorded in 1981, 2001 or 2011. The island has been privately owned by the same family since the 1880s and has three holiday homes with currently no permanent inhabitants. Carna House, rebuilt as a holiday home in 1920s and largely untouched since then, and Carna Cottage are available to rent on a self-catered basis through Carna Conservation Initiative.

A graveyard still remains above and behind Carna Cottage, which has headstones marked from 1707 to 2008. The last use occurred there in 2009 when the ashes of Margaret Hewer, a former owner in the family, were scattered there. Her father Dr Earnshaw Hewer was also buried on Carna in 1931.

== Glencripesdale Estate ==
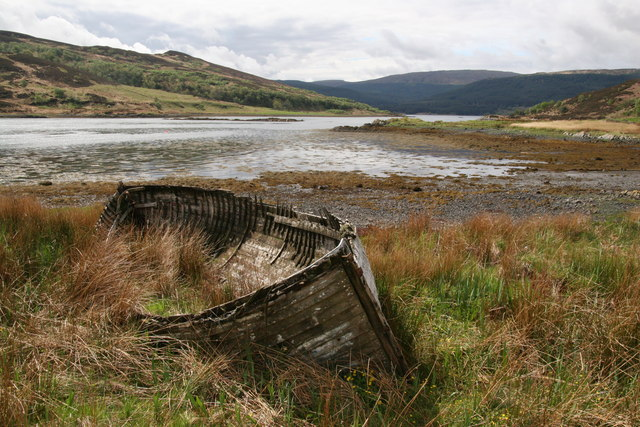
An old boat on Carna

Carna once formed part of the neighbouring Glencripesdale Estate stretched for 32 kilometres (20 mi) along the entire south side of Loch Sunart, and the entire east side of Loch Teacuis. It comprised the smaller estates of Glencripesdale, Laudale and Rahoy, and measured 106 square kilometres (41 sq mi), and its centre point was the 27-bedroom Glencripesdale Castle.

It was purchased in the 1870s by the three Newton brothers (Canon Horace Newton, Goodwin Newton & William Newton III). Dr. Earnshaw Hewer, the son in law of Canon Newton, bought the island in 1922 when the rest of the estate was being sold after the Canon's death and thus Carna is the last remaining part still owned by the family.

== See also ==
- List of islands of Scotland
