= Barrells Hall =

Country house in Warwickshire, England

Coordinates: 52.2967°N 1.8189°W

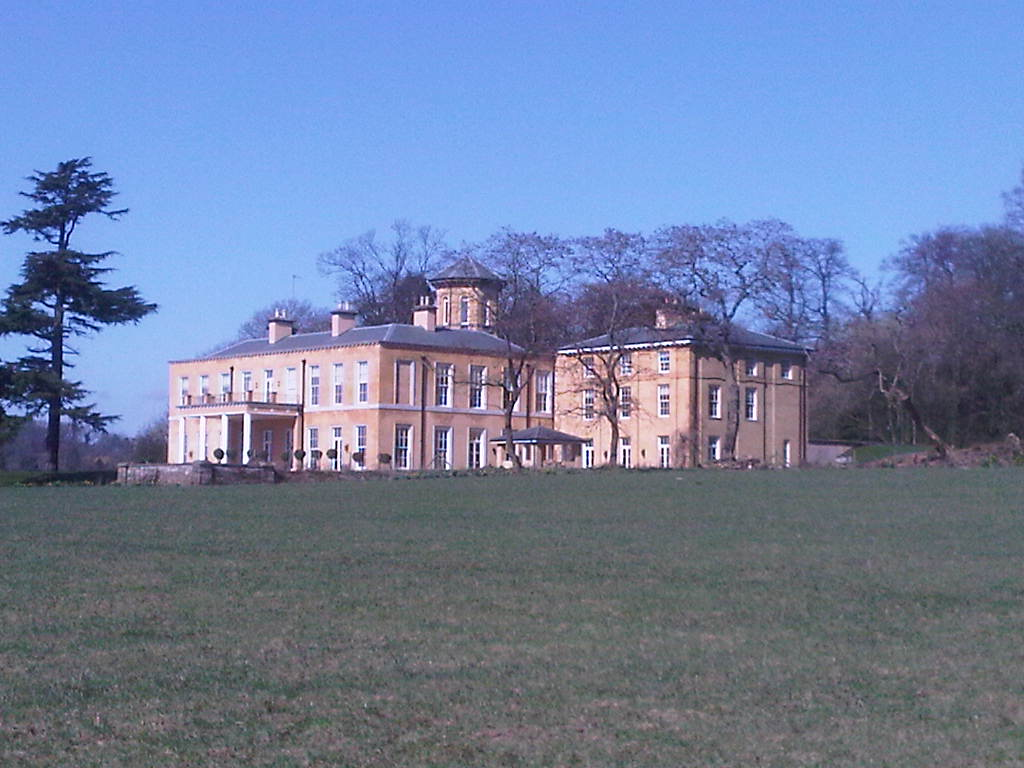
Barrells Hall

Barrells Hall is a large house in the Warwickshire countryside near Henley-in-Arden. The nearest village is Ullenhall, which for many years was the estate village, large parts of it having been built by the owners of Barrells Hall, the Newtons, one of the families who formerly owned Barrells. An adjacent house named Barrells Park was built in about 1950 on part of the Barrells estate.

== History ==
The earliest mention of Barrels (as it was spelled at that time) was a reference to a Richard Barel in 1405. In 1554 the estate was purchased by Robert Knight of Beoley and remained in the Knight family until 1856. An inventory taken in 1652 shows that it was an ordinary farmhouse, though a Knight appeared in the 1682 visitation of Warwick. When Henrietta St John was banished to Barrells in 1736 (see below) it was still much the same and in very bad condition. On Henrietta’s death her husband, then Lord Catherlough, rebuilt large parts of it.

When Catherlough’s son married in 1791 he commissioned the noted Italian architect Joseph Bonomi the Elder to build an imposing extension, which became the main house at this time.

The Newtons, a local family bought the Barrells Park estate in 1856, and soon after enlarged the property again, adding another wing, a Winter garden and various other features.

The house was the victim of a serious fire in March 1935. It slowly fell into ruin over the next 65 years, before being extensively restored in 2006.

== Ownership ==
=== The Knights ===
As mentioned above, the Knight family first established themselves at Barrells in 1554.

Robert Knight (1675–1744) became notorious as the cashier of the South Sea Company responsible for the “South Sea Bubble” and absconded to France with a fortune. He built Luxborough House in Chigwell, Essex and never lived at Barrells. His son, also named Robert Knight (1702–1772), became successively Baron Luxborough, Viscount Barrells and Earl of Catherlough. He purchased Barrells from a cousin in 1730. He banished his wife Henrietta St John to Barrells in 1736 as punishment for an indiscretion. As Henrietta, Lady Luxborough, she was one of the first to establish a ferme ornée and is credited with the invention of the word “shrubbery”. Her friends, a group of poets, became known as the Warwickshire Coterie. His only daughter Henrietta married firstly Charles Wymondfold, secondly Hon. Josiah Tylney, an officer in the Royal Navy, younger son of Richard Child, 1st Earl Tylney.

After his wife Henrietta’s death in 1756, Catherlough began to live at Barrells and had several children by Jane Davies, the daughter of one of his tenants. He was unable to marry her because Lady Le Quesne, whom he married in 1756, refused to release him. But he arranged by Act of Parliament for his son by Jane Davies to take the name of Robert Knight and inherit his fortune, but not his titles. When this next Robert Knight (1768–1855) died the Reverend Henry Charles Knight, who claimed to be his son by the Hon Frances Dormer but was disowned by Robert, attempted to obtain the Barrells estate, but the resulting legal dispute was settled by the sale of Barrells and splitting the proceeds.

=== The Newtons ===
The house was bought in 1856 by William Newton II, who lived there with his wife Mary Whincopp and children Goodwin Newton (1832–1907), William Newton III, Canon Horace Newton, and Mary Rosa (who later married Henry Cheetham, Bishop of Sierra Leone, having moved from the Whateley Hall Estate near Castle Bromwich (which they still owned up til the 1880s).

Barrells Park was the main house of the family, in addition to the large (26,000 acre) estate in Scotland at Glencripesdale Estate, and Canon Horace Newton's house Holmwood, Redditch nearby (which was designed for Horace Newton by the architect, and vague relative Temple Lushington Moore.

Upon William Newton II's death in 1862 Goodwin Newton inherited the Barrells estate and lived there until his death in 1907. His son, Hugh Goodwin Newton, lived there until his death in 1921.

Large areas of the village of Ullenhall were owned by the estate, including the pub, coffee house, school, church, post office etc., and several houses.

The three Newton brothers (Goodwin Newton, Canon Horace Newton and William Newton III) built St Mary's church in Ullenhall as a dedication to their parents William II and Mary Newton, who originally bought Barrells.

The family owned whole streets of commercial property in Birmingham, including part of New Street, as well as Welsh slate quarries and mines in Llanberis, including Bryn Bras Castle. Barrells Hall was sold in 1924, the Scottish estates were sold in several sections up til the 1960s (bar the Isle of Carna which is still owned by some of the Newton descendants coming through the Milward's Needles of Barlow Woodseats Hall line)
