= Wythburn Church =

Coordinates: 54.5130°N 3.0451°W

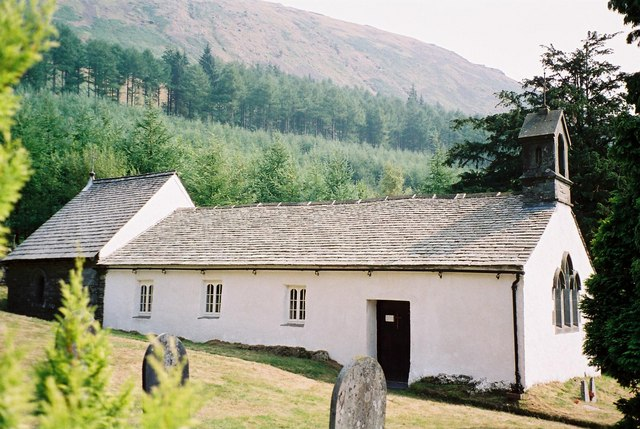
- Wythburn Church, from the north

- Location in Cumbria
- OS grid reference: NY 324 136
- Location: Thirlmere, Cumbria
- Country: England
- Denomination: Anglican
- Website: Wythburn Church

Architecture
- Functional status: Active
- Heritage designation: Grade II
- Designated: 3 March 1967
- Architect: C. J. Ferguson (?) (extension)
- Architectural type: Church
- Completed: 1872

Administration
- Province: York
- Diocese: Carlisle
- Archdeaconry: West Cumberland
- Deanery: Derwent
- Parish: St. John's in the Vale and Wyburn

Wythburn Church is situated in an isolated location beside the A591 road, on the eastern bank of Thirlmere in Cumbria, England. It is an active Anglican church in the deanery of Derwent, the archdeaconry of West Cumberland, and the diocese of Carlisle. Its benefice is united with those of St Mary, Threlkeld, and St John, St John's in the Vale. The church is recorded in the National Heritage List for England as a designated Grade II listed building. The poet William Wordsworth described it as a "modest house of prayer".

== History ==
A church is recorded as being on the site in 1554. It was rebuilt in 1640, and again in 1740. A chancel with an apse was added in 1872, possibly by C. J. Ferguson. The size of the local population was greatly reduced when the adjacent valley was flooded to create Thirlmere Reservoir by the Manchester Corporation. However, the church remains in active use.

== Architecture ==
Wythburn Church is small—only approximately 585 square feet (54.3 m^{2}) inside—with whitewashed walls, and small square side windows. It is roofed in green slates. The plan consists of a three-bay nave, a slightly taller apse at the east end, and a north vestry. On the west gable is a bellcote. At the west end is a triple lancet window, and the apse and vestry contain narrow round-headed windows. Inside the church is an open timber roof. The altar, choir stalls and screen are in the Arts and Crafts style. The stained glass in the west window, dated 1889, was designed by Temple Moore. The centre window in the apse, dating from 1892, was designed by Henry Holiday for Powells, and the glass in the windows to the sides of this is dated 1906 and was designed by Hugh Arnold.

== See also ==
- List of church fittings and furniture by Temple Moore
