= List of miscellaneous works by Temple Moore =

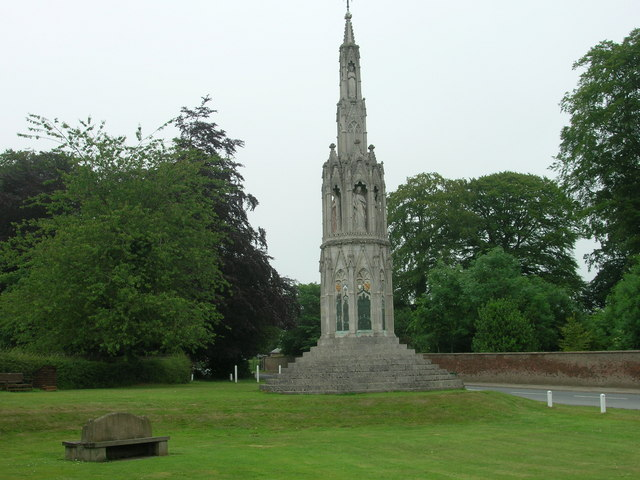
Eleanor Cross, Sledmere, East Yorkshire

Temple Moore (1856–1920) was an English architect who practised from an office in London. He was born in Tullamore, Ireland, and was the son of an army officer. He was educated at Glasgow High School, then privately. In 1875, he was articled to George Gilbert Scott, Jr. Moore set up an independent practice in 1878, but continued to work with Scott for some years, and completed some of his commissions. Moore's designs were mainly in Gothic Revival style, and although he worked in the later years of that tradition, his "artistic destiny was not to preserve an attenuating tradition but to bring to maturity a development which otherwise would have remained incomplete". Temple Moore was mainly a church architect, designing some 40 new churches and restoring or making alterations and additions to other churches, but he also designed works of different types, including country houses, memorials, schools, parish halls, and a hospital. One of Moore's pupils was Giles Gilbert Scott. In 1919 Moore's son-in-law, Leslie Moore, became a partner, and he continued the work of the practice after Temple Moore's death at his home in Hampstead in 1920.

This list contains a variety of works that are not included in the other lists of Morre's works, which all related to churches. They contain information about new churches, their restorations, additions, alterations, and their fittings and furnishings.

== Key ==
Grade	Criteria
Grade I	Buildings of exceptional interest, sometimes considered to be internationally important.
Grade II*	Particularly important buildings of more than special interest.
Grade II	Buildings of national importance and special interest.

== Works ==
Name	Location	Photograph	Date	Notes	Grade
Beechwood and The Beeches	Driffield, East Riding of Yorkshire; 54.0014°N 0.4287°W	—	1878	Extension to a house dating from about 1831.	II
The Quarry	Oswestry, Shropshire; 52.8560°N 3.0634°W	—	1882–83	Temple Moore's first new house, in Norman Shaw's Old English style, the lower part in brick, the upper part half-timbered. Later used as a school.	—
Highfield	Driffield, East Riding of Yorkshire; 54.0112°N 0.4406°W	—	1882–85	A house of 1864, remodelled by Temple Moore. Later used as a country club.	II
Pusey House	St Giles', Oxford; 51.7566°N 1.2604°W		1886–1914	A religious institution named after Edward Bouverie Pusey, one of the leaders of the Oxford Movement, designed by Temple Moore, with the chapel added in 1914.	II
Holmwood House	Redditch, Worcestershire; 52.3028°N 1.9514°W	—	1893	Built as a vicarage for Canon Horace Newton.	II*
Eleanor Cross, Sledmere	Sledmere, East Riding of Yorkshire; 54.06917°N 0.58248°W		1895	Designed by Temple Moore for Sir Tatton Sykes; later used as a memorial for the First World War.	II
Churchyard cross	Sledmere, East Riding of Yorkshire; 54.0685°N 0.5803°W	—	c. 1898	Designed by Temple Moore for Sir Tatton Sykes.	II
Treasurer's House	York, North Yorkshire; 53.9630°N 1.0808°W		Late 19th century	Restored by Temple Moore.	I
Grays Court	York, North Yorkshire; 53.9633°N 1.0808°W		c. 1900	Restored by Temple Moore.	I
Old Vicarage	Helmsley, North Yorkshire		c. 1900	Designed by Temple Moore.	II
Town Hall	Helmsley, North Yorkshire; 54.2461°N 1.0618°W		1901	In Queen Anne style, standing in the Market Place.	II
Bilbrough Manor	Bilbrough, North Yorkshire; 53.9112°N 1.1953°W	—	1902	A country house built for Guy Thomas Fairfax.	II
St William's College	York, East Riding of Yorkshire; 53.9623°N 1.0802°W		1902	Restoration of a 15th-century college of the chantry priests of York Minster.	I
Gatehouse	Eglingham Hall, Eglingham, Northumberland; 55.4698°N 1.8365°W	—	1903	The gateway was built in the 18th century and altered by Temple Moore in 1903.	II
12–18 Petergate	York, North Yorkshire; 53.9625°N 1.0845°W		c. 1905	A row of timber-framed houses, reconstructed by Temple Moore. Since used as an arts centre.	II
South Hill Park	Bracknell, Berkshire; 51.3937°N 0.7500°W		1906	A country house dating from the 18th century, remodelled for Lord Haversham.	II
War memorial	Coxwold, North Yorkshire; 54.18777°N 1.18416°W		1919	Designed by Temple Moore, erection supervised by Leslie Moore.	II
War Memorial	St George's Churchyard, Pontesbury, Shropshire; 52.6487°N 2.8886°W	—	1919–21	Ornate stone crucifix with additional figures of Virgin Mary, Mary Magdalene and St George; dismantled 1960 and replaced on site with plain cross.	—
Churchyard cross	Higham Ferrers, Northamptonshire; 52.30639°N 0.59212°W		20th century	The cross dates from the 14th century. Temple Moore added a capital depicting the Virgin and Child, and the Crucifixion.	I
Dalby Hall	Dalby, Lincolnshire; 53.2091°N 0.1106°E		Undated	The hall dates from the 18th century, but was rebuilt in 1856 by James Fowler after being destroyed by fire. Temple Moore later made additions.	II
The Priory (Hostel of the Resurrection)	Leeds, West Yorkshire		1908-1928		II

== See also ==
- List of new churches by Temple Moore
- List of church restorations and alterations by Temple Moore
- List of church fittings and furniture by Temple Moore
