= Chapel of Rest, Brompton, Scarborough =

Chapel of Rest, Brompton Cemetery
- Chapel of Rest, Brompton, Scarborough
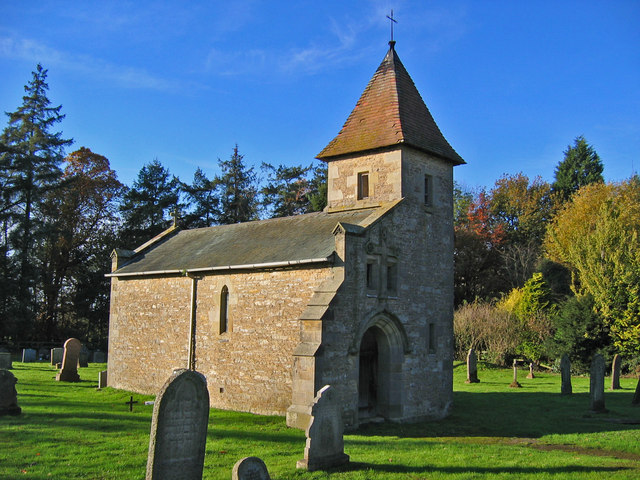
- An early work by Temple Moore

- Location in North Riding of Yorkshire
- 54.2221°N 0.5506°W
- OS grid reference: SE 94595 81684
- Location: Brompton, Scarborough, North Yorkshire
- Country: England
- Denomination: Church of England

History
- Founded: 1889
- Founder: Sir George Cayley

Architecture
- Heritage designation: Grade II
- Designated: 3 September 2019
- Architect: Temple Moore

Administration
- Diocese: Diocese of York

The Chapel of Rest, Brompton Cemetery, Brompton, Scarborough, in North Yorkshire, England is an early work by the ecclesiastical architect Temple Moore. It is a Grade II listed building.

== History ==
In 1880, the newly-appointed vicar of All Saints, Brompton-by-Sawdon, the Rev. Francis Chambers, instigated a series of improvements to the church, including the closure of its original churchyard, and its replacement by a new cemetery. The construction of a chapel of rest in the new cemetery was financed by Sir George Cayley, the local squire, resident at Brompton Hall. (Note: Sir George's ancestor, George Caley, was an engineer, known as the "Father of Aeronautics", and was buried in the old cemetery at Brompton.) Cayley's architect was Temple Lushington Moore, then aged 33, whose subsequent career saw him design about 40 new churches, and restore many more, becoming "England's leading ecclesiastical architect from the mid-Edwardian years".

== Architecture and description ==
The chapel comprises a broad gable facing the cemetery, with an asymmetrical bell tower ending in a pyramidal roof. Pevsner, in his Yorkshire: The North Riding volume, (Note: The North Riding volume, published in 1966, begins with Pevsner's dedication to "Those publicans and hoteliers of England who provide me with a table in my bedroom to scribble on".) records its "wonderfully lopsided" appearance, but does not attribute the chapel to Moore. The chapel was designated a Grade II listed building on 3 September 2019.

== Sources ==
- Pevsner, Nikolaus (1966). Yorkshire: The North Riding. The Buildings of England. Harmsworth, Middlesex: Penguin Books. ISBN 9780140710298. OCLC 37203.
