= List of church restorations and alterations by Temple Moore =

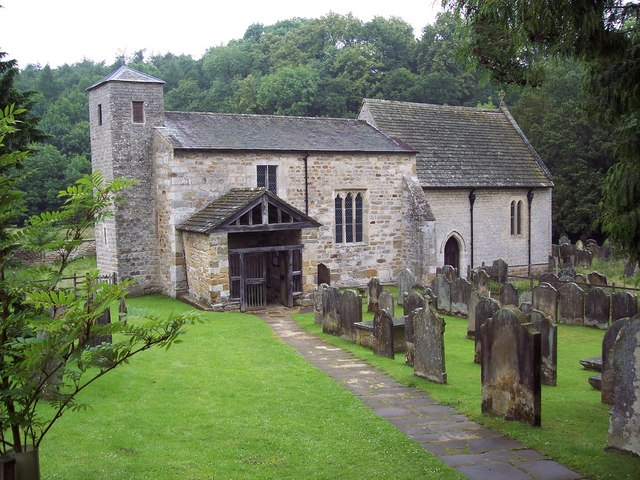
St Gregory's Minster, an Anglo-Saxon church restored by Temple Moore

Temple Moore (1856–1920) was an English architect who practised from an office in London. He was born in Tullamore, Ireland, and was the son of an army officer. He was educated at Glasgow High School, then privately. In 1875, he was articled to George Gilbert Scott, Jr. Moore set up an independent practice in 1878, but continued to work with Scott for some years, and completed some of his commissions. Moore's designs were mainly in Gothic Revival style, and although he worked in the later years of that tradition, his "artistic destiny was not to preserve an attenuating tradition but to bring to maturity a development which otherwise would have remained incomplete". Temple Moore was mainly a church architect, designing some 40 new churches and restoring or making alterations and additions to other churches, but he also designed works of different types, including country houses, memorials, schools, parish halls, and a hospital. One of Moore's pupils was Giles Gilbert Scott. In 1919 Moore's son-in-law, Leslie Moore, became a partner, and he continued the work of the practice after Temple Moore's death at his home in Hampstead in 1920.

This is a list of the major churches restored by Temple Moore, and churches to which he made additions and alterations.

== Key ==
Grade	Criteria
Grade I	Buildings of exceptional interest, sometimes considered to be internationally important.
Grade II*	Particularly important buildings of more than special interest.
Grade II	Buildings of national importance and special interest.

== Churches ==
Name	Location	Photograph	Date	Notes	Grade
St Mary	Old Leake, Lincolnshire; 53.0313°N 0.0974°E		1873–75	Restored the chancel.	I
St Chad	Sproxton, North Yorkshire; 54.2264°N 1.0598°W		1879	Formerly the chapel of West Newton Grange, it was moved here and re-erected by Temple Moore and George Gilbert Scott, Jr. Most of the furnishings are by Temple Moore.	II
Holy Trinity	Raithby by Spilsby, Lincolnshire; 53.1829°N 0.0544°E		1886	A 12th-century church partly rebuilt in 1873 by George Gilbert Scott, the chancel was extended in 1886 by Temple Moore, and the tower renewed in 1895 by Hodgson Fowler.	II*
St Mary	Malton, North Yorkshire; 54.1426°N 0.7790°W		1887	Restoration under the guidance of George Gilbert Scott of a former Gilbertine priory.	I
St Mary	Radwinter, Essex; 52.0107°N 0.3391°E		1887	Added the tower and spire.	II*
St Mary	Driffield, East Riding of Yorkshire; 54.0063°N 0.4606°W		1889	The church has a 12th-century origin, and a tower dating from the 15th century. The nave and chancel were rebuilt in 1889 by Temple Moore.	II*
St Germain	Winestead, East Riding of Yorkshire; 53.6941°N 0.0346°W		1889–90	Restoration of the 12th-century church, including adding a new south aisle, rebuilding the south chapel, partial rebuilding of the north wall, re-roofing and re-seating the church, and restoration of the chancel screen.	I
St John	Leeds, West Yorkshire; 53.8001°N 1.5423°W		1890–	Restoration of a church dating from 1632 to 1634. Now redundant and under the care of the Churches Conservation Trust.	I
St Swithun	Littleham, Devon; 50.9898°N 4.2191°W		1892	Restoration, including the addition of a rood screen.	I
St Elgin	North Frodingham, East Riding of Yorkshire; 53.9653°N 0.3403°W		1892	Temple Moore added a belfry to a church with a tower dating from the 15th century, and a nave and chancel from 1878.	II*
St Paul	Cambridge; 52.1976°N 0.1294°E		1893	Removed the galleries and added transepts to a church built in 1841. The church has been converted into dual use as a church and an events centre.	II
St Peter	Helperthorpe, North Yorkshire; 54.1207°N 0.5438°W		1893–94	Added the north aisle and a vestry to a church of 1872–75 by G. E. Street.	II
St Stephen	Redditch, Worcestershire; 52.3071°N 1.9408°W		1893	Additions and alterations.	II
St Andrew	Normanby, North Yorkshire; 54.2253°N 0.8745°W		1893–95	Restored a church dating from the 12th century and rebuilt the chancel.	II*
All Saints	Hougham, Lincolnshire; 52.9880°N 0.6807°W		1895–96	The church, dating from the 11th century with later additions and alterations, was restored by Temple Moore in 1895–96.	I
St Mark	Swindon, Wiltshire; 51.5613°N 1.7947°W		1897	Added a north vestry to a church built in 1843–45.	II
St Augustine	Kirkby, North Yorkshire; 54.4470°N 1.1713°W		c. 1900	Rebuilt the chancel of a church built in 1815.	II*
St Oswald	Newton under Roseberry, North Yorkshire; 54.5114°N 1.1222°W		1901	Temple Moore added a west tower to the church, which originated in the 12th century.	II*
St Edmund	Seaton Ross, East Riding of Yorkshire; 53.8623°N 0.8136°W		1901–08	Restoration of a church built in 1788.	II
St James	Nunburnholme, East Riding of Yorkshire; 53.9194°N 0.7107°W		c. 1902	Added the west tower and south porch to a church dating from the 12th century.	I
St Hilda	Danby, North Yorkshire; 54.4473°N 0.9279°W		1903	Restoration of a church originating in the 14th century.	II*
St Michael	Highgate, Camden, Greater London; 51.5689°N 0.1503°W		1903	Extension of a church built in 1830–32, designed by Lewis Vulliamy; this consisted of work on the chancel, enlarging the sanctuary, and the decoration of the east wall.	II*
All Saints	Market Weighton, East Riding of Yorkshire; 53.8649°N 0.6670°W		1903	Replaced the tracery in the east window.	I
St Nicholas	Guisborough, North Yorkshire; 54.5366°N 1.0488°W		1904–08	Restoration of a church dating from about 1500, including restoration of the aisle walls.	II*
All Saints	Brandsby-cum-Stearsby, North Yorkshire; 54.1398°N 1.0855°W		1905	Restoration of a church built in 1767–70.	II*
St Peter	Wrockwardine, Shropshire; 52.7048°N 2.5571°W		1906–07	Church underpinned.	I
All Saints	Ecclesall, Sheffield, South Yorkshire; 53.3568°N 1.5121°W		1906–08	Added transepts, chancel, vestries, and a south chapel to a church built in 1789.	II
All Saints	Holme-on-Spalding-Moor, East Riding of Yorkshire; 53.8403°N 0.7538°W		1906–11	A church dating from the 13th century restored by Temple Moore in 1906–11.	I
All Saints	Croxley Green, Hertfordshire; 51.6467°N 0.4554°W	—	1907	Extended the church, built in 1870–72, to the south.	II
All Saints	Cheltenham, Gloucestershire; 51.9023°N 2.0639°W		c. 1907	Refurbishment of a church built in 1865–68.	I
St Gregory's Minster	Kirkdale, North Yorkshire; 54.2632°N 0.9624°W		1907–09	Restoration of an Anglo-Saxon church.	I
St Mary	Church Houses, Farndale, North Yorkshire; 54.3694°N 0.9662°W		1907–14	Restoration and extension to a church built in 1831.	II
Hexham Abbey	Hexham, Northumberland; 54.9716°N 2.1025°W		1908	Nave rebuilt.	I
St John of Beverley	Harpham, East Riding of Yorkshire; 54.0386°N 0.3336°W		1909	The east window dated 1909 is by Temple Moore.	I
St Michael	Hill, Gloucestershire; 51.6548°N 2.5082°W		1909	With William Weir, Temple Moore rebuilt the porch and added buttresses.	II*
St Mary Magdalene	Faceby, North Yorkshire; 54.4203°N 1.2378°W		1911	Extension of the chancel of a church built in 1874–75.	II
St John	Hampstead, Camden, Greater London; 51.5553°N 0.1811°W		1912	Converted a vestry into the chapel of St Mary and St John, and added new vestries to a church built in 1745–47.	I
St Mary	Welton, Lincolnshire; 53.3052°N 0.4837°W		1912	Added a vestry to a church dating from the 13th century.	II*
St Mary	Nottingham; 52.9512°N 1.1430°W		1912–13	Added a south chancel chapel to a church dating from the 15th century.	I
St Mary	Kempley, Gloucestershire; 51.9788°N 2.4820°W		1913	Restoration.	I
All Saints	Roos, East Riding of Yorkshire; 53.7469°N 0.0442°W		1913	Restoration, including the design of the chancel screen and reredos.	I
St Peter	Lincoln; 53.2356°N 0.5335°W		1914	Added the south aisle to a church built in 1870.	II
St Mary	Hendon, Barnet, Greater London; 51.5915°N 0.2276°W		1914–15	Added to the nave, and built a south aisle on a church dating from the 13th century.	II*
St Paul	Sandgate, Kent; 51.0745°N 1.1495°E		1915	The church was built in 1849, designed by S. S. Teulon. It was restored and the galleries were removed by Temple Moore in 1915; later a west porch was added by C. M. Oldrid Scott.	II
St Peter at Gowts	Lincoln; 53.2217°N 0.5439°W		1920	Added a hanging rood in the chancel.	I
Chapel	Lancing College, Lancing, West Sussex; 50.8466°N 0.3025°W		1920–27	Added the War Memorial Cloister to the south side.	I
Chantry Chapel of All Souls	Higham Ferrers, Northamptonshire; 52.3065°N 0.5919°W		Early 20th century	This was built in 1422 by Archbishop Henry Chichele as a school, possibly replacing an earlier school. It was later used as a chantry chapel. Restored by Temple Moore.	I

== See also ==
- List of new churches by Temple Moore
- List of church fittings and furniture by Temple Moore
- List of miscellaneous works by Temple Moore
