= Beinn Resipol =

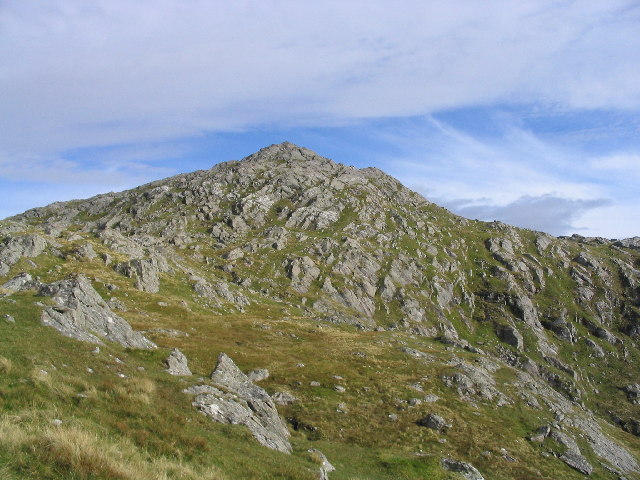
- Beinn Resipol summit

Highest point
- Elevation: 845 m (2,772 ft)
- Prominence: 502 m (1,647 ft)
- Listing: Corbett, Marilyn
- Coordinates: 56°43′38″N 5°39′09″W

Geography
- Location: Lochaber, Scotland
- Parent range: Northwest Highlands
- OS grid: NM766654
- Topo map: OS Landranger 40

Beinn Resipol (845 m) is a mountain of the Northwest Highlands, Scotland, in the Ardnamurchan area of Lochaber.

The mountain is the most western of Scotland's large peaks. It lies between Loch Sunart and Loch Shiel.
