= Glencripesdale House =

Coordinates: 56.6657°N 5.8168°W

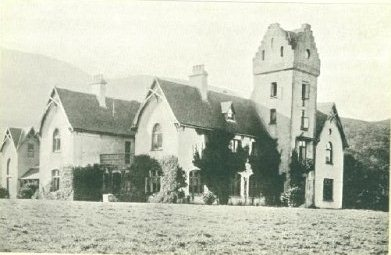
View of the house from the lawn

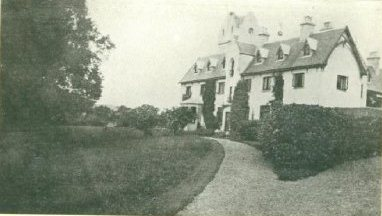
House & drive looking West to Carna Island

Glencripesdale House, or Glencripesdale Castle as it was sometimes referred to, was the centre of the 26,000-acre (11,000-hectare) Glencripesdale Estate, and was situated along the south side of Loch Sunart, a sea loch in the west highlands of Scotland.

Glencripesdale was a grand house built for, and uniquely designed by, the Newton brothers in 1874 and featured 28 bedrooms. Twenty of these bedrooms were large and for the use of family and guests, with the remaining eight for servants quarters with multiple beds, some in dormitory style rooms. The house is believed to be the first in Scotland to be built of the as then state of the art material, Concrete. Materials had to be floated along the loch due to the lack of access to the site from nearby roads, mainly by steam ship. The cement was mixed with pebbles off the shore

Because the house was largely served by sea, due to the remote nature, the house featured its own private Dock for steam ships of up to 100 tonnes, such as the SY Kelpie, the Newtons 100 ft Steam Launch.

The Factors house, or Land Agent as he would be known in England, situated a few miles east up the coast at Laudale, still exists and is a substantial dwelling in its own right having been built with 9 bedrooms, and has been enlarged further over the years.

== Architectural style and location ==
Glencripesdale House featured a very distinct and unusual blend of architectural styles including, among other things, white harled walls, Gothic windows and a large tower which resembled a lift-shaft crowned with crowstep gables.

The house was a blend of new building methods, “traditional” Scottish Baronial elements and a general appearance suggestive, perhaps, of a monastery in parts. Whilst unconventional in style, the result was considered pleasing. With two of the three Newton brothers being clergymen, some have remarked that the ecclesiastical flavour of much of the building is perhaps attributable to their career choice. There is a suggestion that they actually designed the house themselves using a church plan as a basis. Another suggestion is that the architect Temple Lushington Moore may have helped design the property, having already designed a large country house Holmwood, Redditch for Canon Horace Newton.

A guest of the family Elizabeth Inglis noted on a visit to Glencripesdale approximately ten years after the house was built that the approach route from the loch was suitably atmospheric:

“To reach Glencripesdale house our track up the hill led past an ancient burying ground, impressive in it s loneliness, its ancient trees standing in reverent bending lines, keeping silent guard over the grey recumbent tombs”.

== Post-1920s domestic and military use ==
The house was occupied by the British military during World War II, specifically the Commando units, who needed extreme countryside to practice manoeuvres on.

The Newtons returned at the end of the war to find large amounts of their belongings had been stolen, and the property and outbuildings severely damaged by the troops, requiring large sums to repair, which was not uncommon at the time.

This, combined with the fact that like many large houses who relied on large numbers of staff to run, meant that the house was not occupied again, and slowly fell into disrepair.

== Destruction ==
Following World War II, a new owner Mr Epps bought the House in 1954 and stripped its lead off the roof, leaving the buildings shell exposed. He was apparently able to sell the lead for more than he had bought the property for.

The estate with the shell of the house was sold to the Forestry Commission, who slowly planted up the woodland with conifers and then sold off the estate in chunks throughout the 1990s.

In 1966 the house was blown up by the Army as part of an exercise with consent of the Forestry Commission, and due to the unique construction, being built of reinforced concrete, required two attempts to blow up. The first time the Army used a normal amount of explosive for the size of the building, however once the dust had cleared the building still stood.

The ruins still remain on the original site, however the land has become very overgrown.
