= List of church fittings and furniture by Temple Moore =

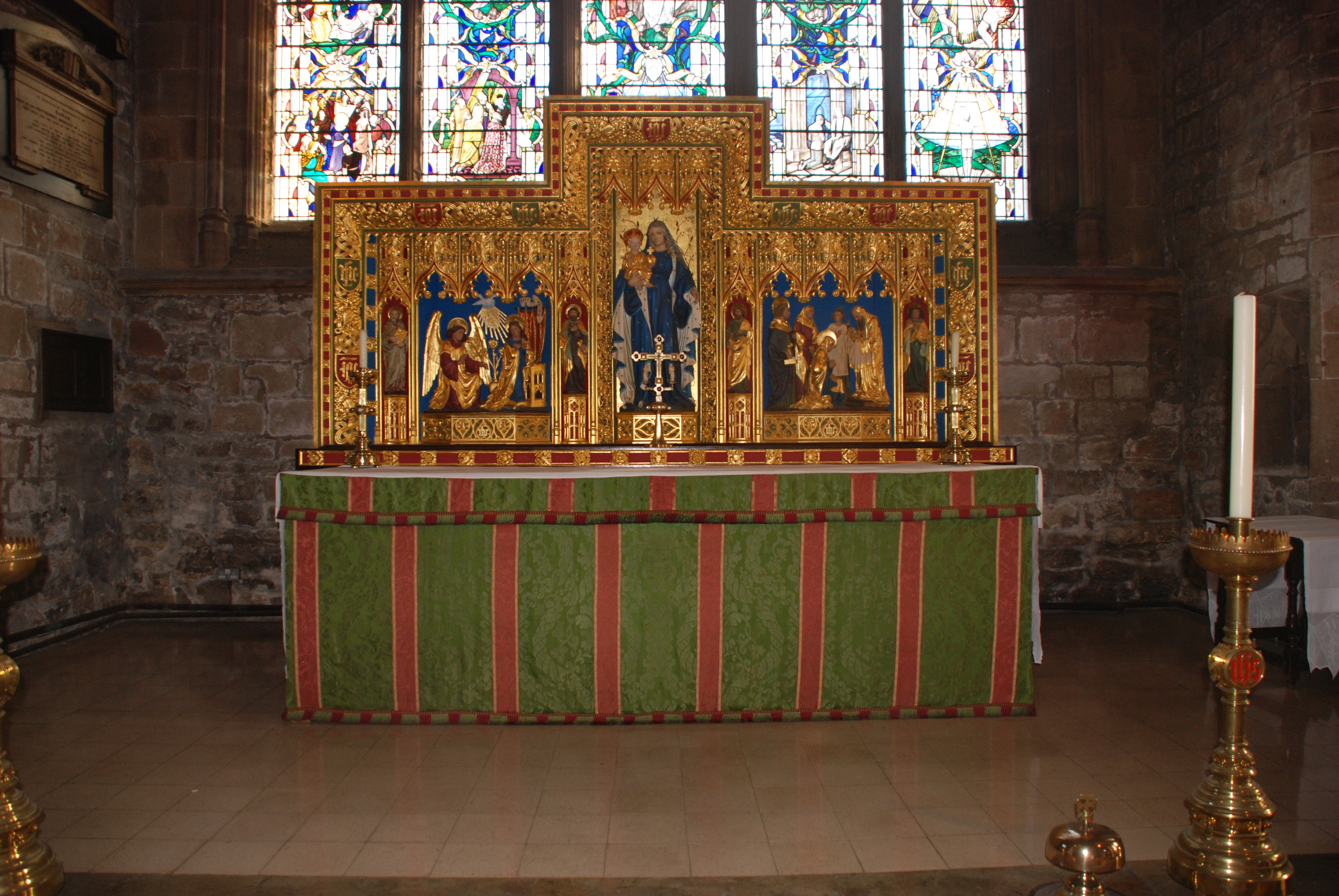
The high altar in the Church of St Mary and All Saints, Chesterfield showing the reredos designed by Temple Moore

Temple Moore (1856–1920) was an English architect who practised from an office in London. He was born in Tullamore, Ireland, and was the son of an army officer. He was educated at Glasgow High School, then privately. In 1875, he was articled to George Gilbert Scott, Jr. Moore set up an independent practice in 1878, but continued to work with Scott for some years, and completed some of his commissions. Moore's designs were mainly in Gothic Revival style, and although he worked in the later years of that tradition, his "artistic destiny was not to preserve an attenuating tradition but to bring to maturity a development which otherwise would have remained incomplete". Temple Moore was mainly a church architect, designing some 40 new churches and restoring or making alterations and additions to other churches, but he also designed works of different types, including country houses, memorials, schools, parish halls, and a hospital. One of Moore's pupils was Giles Gilbert Scott. In 1919 Moore's son-in-law, Leslie Moore, became a partner, and he continued the work of the practice after Temple Moore's death at his home in Hampstead in 1920.

This list contains church fittings and furniture designed by Temple Moore. The gradings are those of the church as a whole.

== Key ==
Grade	Criteria
Grade I	Buildings of exceptional interest, sometimes considered to be internationally important.
Grade II*	Particularly important buildings of more than special interest.
Grade II	Buildings of national importance and special interest.

== Misc ==
Name	Location	Photograph	Date	Notes	Grade
Wythburn Church	Thirlmere, Cumbria; 54.5130°N 3.0451°W		1889	Designed the stained glass in the west window.	II
St Mary Bishophill Junior	York, East Riding of Yorkshire; 53.9559°N 1.0872°W		1889	Designed the pulpit and reredos.	I
All Saints	Market Weighton, East Riding of Yorkshire; 53.8649°N 0.6670°W		1903	Designed the oak reredos, carved by Shepherdson.	I
St Andrew's Church	Kirkandrews-on-Eden, Cumbria; 55.0386°N 2.9543°W		1892–93	The furnishings are in Classical style and include a rood screen, and a reredos.	II*
All Saints Church	Brompton by Sawdon, North Yorkshire; 54.2262°N 0.5552°W		1893	Organ case and gallery.	I
St Mary's Church	Lockington, East Riding of Yorkshire; 53.9083°N 0.4836°W		c. 1893	A screen at the west end incorporating materials from the 17th and 18th centuries.	I
Coneysthorpe Chapel	Coneysthorpe, North Yorkshire; 54.1337°N 0.9117°W		1894	The furnishings include pews, the dado, a wooden lectern, and a painted reredos in Arts and Crafts style.	II
Church of St Mary and All Saints	Chesterfield, Derbyshire; 53.2361°N 1.4244°W		1898	Reredos behind the high altar.	I
St John the Baptist's Church	Pockley, North Yorkshire; 54.2665°N 1.0230°W		1898–99	Designed the screen for a church built by George Gilbert Scott or his son in the 1870s.	II
Holy Spirit Church	Southsea, Hampshire; 50.7912°N 1.0748°W		19th century	The fittings were installed as part of a restoration by Stephen Dykes Bower in 1956–58, following damage to the church by bombing in 1941. They were originally in St Agnes' Church, Kennington, London.	II
St Michael and All Angels	Headingley, Leeds, West Yorkshire; 53.8192°N 1.5760°W		1905	The reredos is in carved, gilded and painted wood, in a church of 1884–45 by J. Loughborough Pearson. It contains depictions of Christ, St George, St Michael, and other saints.	II*
St Peter's Church	St Albans, Hertfordshire; 51.7556°N 0.3351°W		1905	A Perpendicular style screen at the west entrance to the crossing.	II*
St Michael and All Angels' Church	Badminton, Gloucestershire; 51.5443°N 2.2800°W	—	1908	Added the organ case, choir stalls, a reredos and a communion rail.	I
St Mary's Church	Bowdon, Greater Manchester; 53.3781°N 2.3644°W		c. 1910	The pulpit and choir stalls.	II*
St Mary's Church	Kingston upon Hull, East Riding of Yorkshire; 53.7438°N 0.3323°W		1912	Screens.	II*
St Nicholas' Church	Roos; East Riding of Yorkshire; 53.7469°N 0.0442°W		1913	Rood screen. There is also a reredos from 1915.	I
St Ambrose Church	Westbourne, Bournemouth, Dorset; 50.7174°N 1.9002°W		1914	Designed the reredos.	II*
All Saints Church	Kirkbymoorside, North Yorkshire; 54.2704°N 0.9306°W		1919	Chancel screen.	I
St Saviour's Church	Leeds, West Yorkshire; 53.7919°N 1.5266°W		1921	Designed a reredos for a church built in 1842–45.	I
St Michael's Church	Barton-le-Street, North Yorkshire; 54.1588°N 0.8970°W		Early 20th century	An organ case in Gothic style, a contrast from the Neo-Norman architecture of the church and most of the other fittings and furnishings.	II
St Nicholas' Church	Islip, Northamptonshire; 52.3993°N 0.5512°W		Early 20th century	Chancel screen, rood figures, and chancel furnishings.	I
St James' Church	Bramley, Hampshire; 51.3264°N 1.0758°W		Undated	Temple Moore designed the chancel seats.	I
St Stephen's Church	Rosslyn Hill, Hampstead, Camden, Greater London; 51.5532°N 0.1684°W		Undated	The church was designed by S. S. Teulon in 1869–71. It is now redundant, and Temple Moore's woodwork has been removed.	I
Holy Evangelists Church	Shipton, North Yorkshire; 54.0237°N 1.1569°W		Undated	Designed the reredos, and choir screen with iron gates.	II
St Philip's Church	Earl's Court		Undated		

== See also ==
- List of new churches by Temple Moore
- List of church restorations and alterations by Temple Moore
- List of miscellaneous works by Temple Moore
