= Horace Newton =

English priest, philanthropist and landowner

Horace Newton (1844–1920) was a priest within the Church of England, philanthropist, and country landowner. In later life his residence was Holmwood, Redditch.

== Background ==
The Newton family owned areas of prime Birmingham land (such as part of New Street, including the site of the current Birmingham New Street station) with Welsh slate quarries and Bryn Bras Castle, Gwynedd. Ethel Street and Newton Street in Birmingham are named after the family. From a strong Christian tradition, they were philanthropists who gave money, built churches (notably in Ullenhall, the estate village of Barrells Hall) and donated to hospitals and other charities.

On the death of his father William Newton II of Barrells Hall and Whateley Hall, Horace Newton, with his brothers T. H. Goodwin Newton and Rev. William Newton III, inherited what was later described, in 1904, as "an absurdly large fortune". They bought a Scottish estate, the 26,000 acres (11,000 ha) Glencripesdale Estate, and Glencripesdale House was designed by Horace and Goodwin Newton.

Horace Newton extended the Beechwood Vicarage near Driffield, Yorkshire, when he was vicar there, using Temple Moore as architect.

== Clerical career ==
Newton matriculated in 1860 at St John's College, Cambridge, graduating B.A. in 1864, and M.A. 1867. He was ordained deacon in 1865, and priest in 1866, and was curate at St Mary's Church, Nottingham from 1865 to 1868.

In 1869 Newton was appointed first vicar of Heworth, near York, and in 1878 he was appointed by Archbishop Thomson to the vicarage of Great-With-Little-Driffield. He became a canon of York Minster in 1885. While incumbent there he gave his own money for the rebuilding of Driffield Church. He employed three curates and two scripture readers. He was then vicar of Redditch from 1892 to 1905.

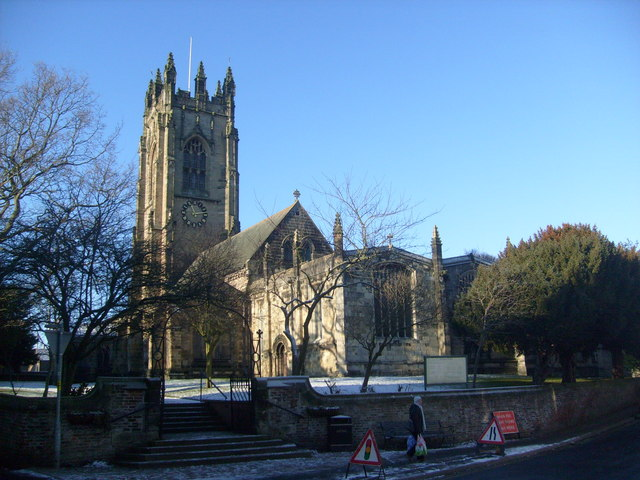
All Saints Church, Driffield, 2010 photograph

== Holmwood ==
Newton at the end of his life lived at Holmwood, Redditch. He had the house built for him by the architect Temple Lushington Moore, who was also a relative, having been offered the post by Lord Windsor.

== Legacy ==
In the 1970s, when the Kingfisher Shopping Centre was opened in Redditch an office block was named after him within the centre: Canon Newton House.

== Family ==
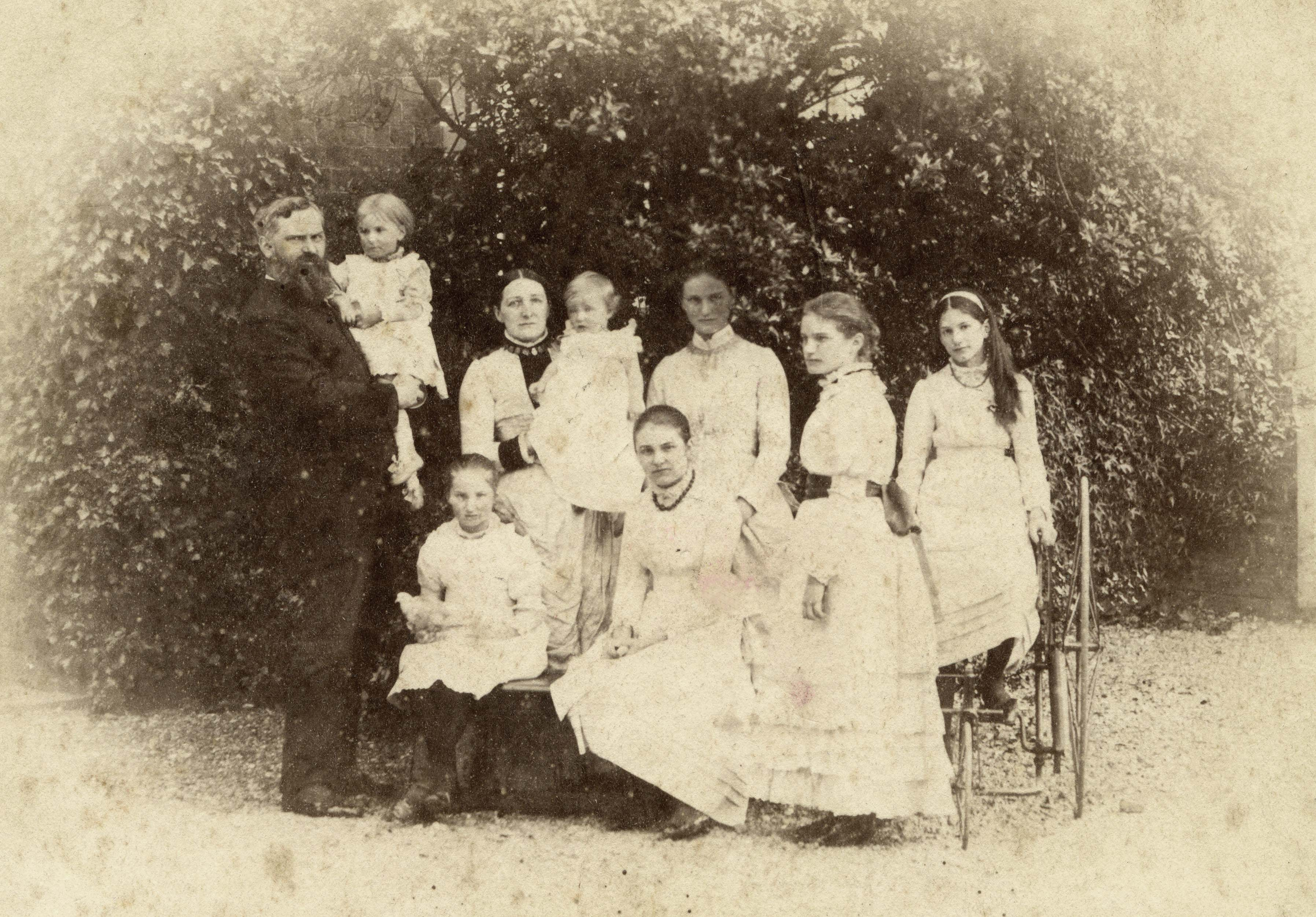
Horace Newton with family and household members, 1887 photograph

Newton married twice:

1. In 1866 to Frances (Fanny) Storrs in 1866, the younger daughter of Robert Storrs of Doncaster. Storrs, a surgeon-apothecary, was the first medical man to note the connection of cleanliness and infection during child birth, before the more famous Ignaz Semmelweis. Frances's elder sister Anne in 1855 married the Rev. Richard Wilton of Londesborough, and was the mother of Emma Storrs Wilton (1856–1938) who married Temple Moore in 1884.
2. After Fanny's death, in 1905 to Katherine Constance Mackrell, daughter of Thomas William Mackrell of Wandsworth, and sister of Matilda who married his brother Goodwin as his second wife. She died in 1921.

There were seven children of the first marriage:

- Ethel, married Edmund Arbuthnott Knox, the evangelical Bishop of Manchester and prayerbook reformer
- Madeleine
- Elsie, married in 1900 Henry Tomson Milward, son of Victor Milward MP.
- Margaret
- Dorothea
- Marjorie
- Horace – died in 1917, having drowned in the Tigris, Basra, Iraq (then called Mesopotamia) with the 13th Hussars. He was buried in Ezra's Tomb.
