= Dragon Rally =

Annual motorcycle camping rally in North Wales

The Dragon Rally
- Genre: Motorcycle rally
- Dates: February
- Frequency: Annually
- Location: North Wales
- Country: Wales
- Founded: 1962
- Founder: Conwy Motorcycle Club
- Attendance: 2,000–3,000
- Area: Europe
- Organizer: Conwy Motorcycle Club
- Website: www.conwymotorcycleclub.org.uk

The Dragon Rally is a motorcycle camping rally held annually during winter in North Wales since 1962, making it one of the UK's longest running bike events. In the 1960s the attendance at the Dragon sometimes topped 3,000 riders; more recently the figure ranged from 1,500 to 2,000 depending on the weather and location. The rally is famed for its toughness and spartan facilities. Riders often have to endure miserable riding conditions to attend the rally and, once on site, they are expected to camp without regard to the weather conditions. It is an event held in veneration by large numbers of motorcyclists as a test of stamina and endurance because (in the first two decades at least) it was common to have to endure snow and ice to ride there. The Dragon is often grouped with the German Elefantentreffen (Elephant Rally) and the Norwegian Krystall Rally.

The first gathering was commemorated by a cloth patch, which soon changed to an enamel pin badge with a different design for each year. Each rally attendee is presented with badge and usually a slate coaster (although there was no coaster in 2008). The rally is usually held on the second weekend of February.

== History ==
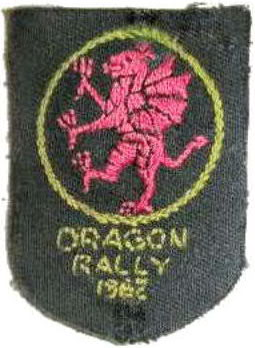

In the early 1960s the British motorcycle press carried reports of the Elefantentreffen (Elephant Rally), held each winter in Germany, a rally famed for the hardships involved in attending. This prompted several British bike journalists to ask if a British winter rally could be a success.

The 23 November 1961 issue of The Motor Cycle carried an article by George Wilson in which he asked, "Can such a dream be realised in this country - a rally for super enthusiasts only, and so organised that by its very nature, only super enthusiasts would want to join in?... But above all it must be held in the dead of winter when only men who are men would be interested and the softies would stay away"

The article brought a flood of replies and soon another journalist, John Ebrell, was sent to North Wales to seek a camping site, with a view to publishing an article that would draw out potential organisers. By a lucky coincidence, as he was scouting around North Wales, a letter arrived at the magazine from Lawrence Irving of the Conwy Club, offering to organise the rally. The Conwy and District Motorcycle Club has run the rally ever since.

The first rally in 1962 was held at Bryn Bras Castle and over 2,000 riders attended. In 1963 and 1964, the rally was held at Gwrych Castle. In his February 1963 three-page article, John Ebrell wrote "By about midnight on Saturday, Conway Club [sic] officials packed up recording details of arrivals. But riders continued to check in and the total must have topped 2,500.

Columnist Nitor commented that the organisational aspect was achieved by 35 club-members bolstered by 10 further volunteers, and that the spirit shown and atmosphere generated was akin to Douglas in the Isle of Man during TT race week.

In 1965, the event moved to a 360-acre site at an ex-RAF camp at Glyn Padarn, close to the Llyn Padarn lake, near Llanberis. Since 1969, the rally has been held at a variety of sites, perhaps the most popular being a riverside field at Capel Curig.

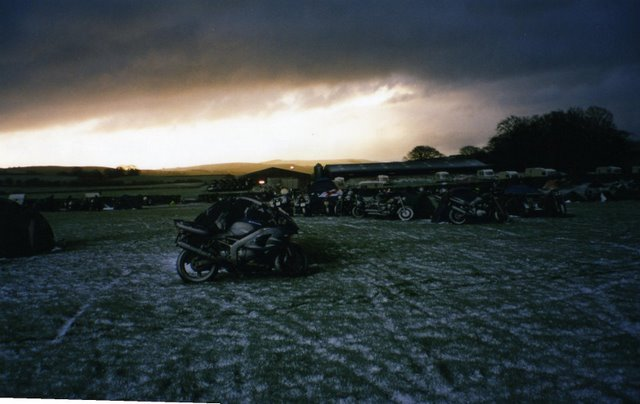
Nightfall at the 2005 Dragon Rally

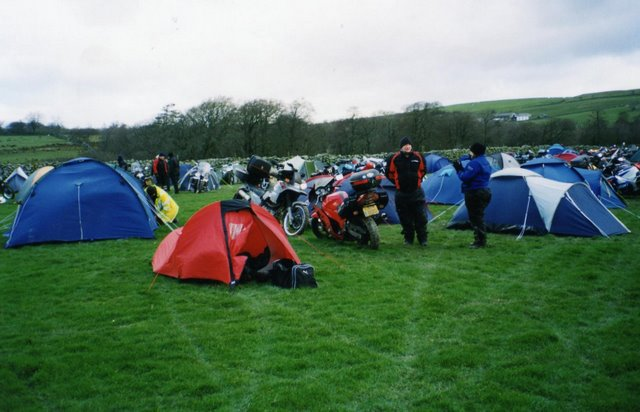
The 2005 hill farm rally site by day

== Recent locations ==
- 1999 - Capel Curig
- 2000 - Capel Curig
- 2001 - Ex Army Camp
- 2002 - Caernarfon airfield
- 2003 - Caernarfon airfield
- 2004 - Capel Curig
- 2005 - hill farm
- 2006 - Anglesey
- 2007 - Anglesey
- 2008 - Beddgelert
- 2009 - Tŷ Croes, Anglesey
- 2010 - Rowen, in the Conwy Valley
- 2011 - Beddgelert
- 2012 - Llyn Gwynant
- 2013 - Llyn Gwynant
- 2014 - just south of Conwy
- 2015 - Capel Curig
- 2016 - Llyn Gwynant
- 2017 - near Bangor
- 2018 - Llyn Gwynant
