= Ullenhall =

Village in Warwickshire, England

Coordinates: 52°18′N 01°49′W

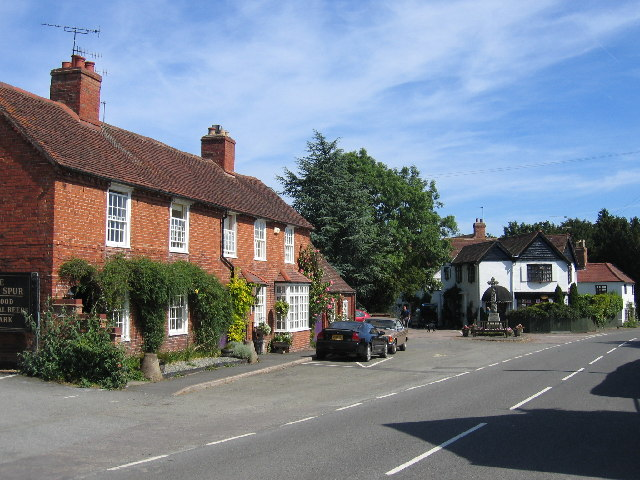
- Village centre looking towards the War Memorial

- Location within Warwickshire
- Population: 717 (2011 Census)
- OS grid reference: SP1206
- Civil parish: Ullenhall
- District: Stratford-on-Avon
- Shire county: Warwickshire
- Region: West Midlands
- Country: England
- Sovereign state: United Kingdom
- Post town: Henley-in-Arden
- Postcode district: B95
- Police: Warwickshire
- Fire: Warwickshire
- Ambulance: West Midlands
- UK Parliament: Stratford-on-Avon,

Ullenhall is a district of Redditch and civil parish in the Stratford-on-Avon district, in the county of Warwickshire, England, situated about 3 miles (4.8 km) west of Henley-in-Arden and 11.2 miles (18.0 km) west of the county town of Warwick. In 2011 the parish had a population of 717.

== History ==
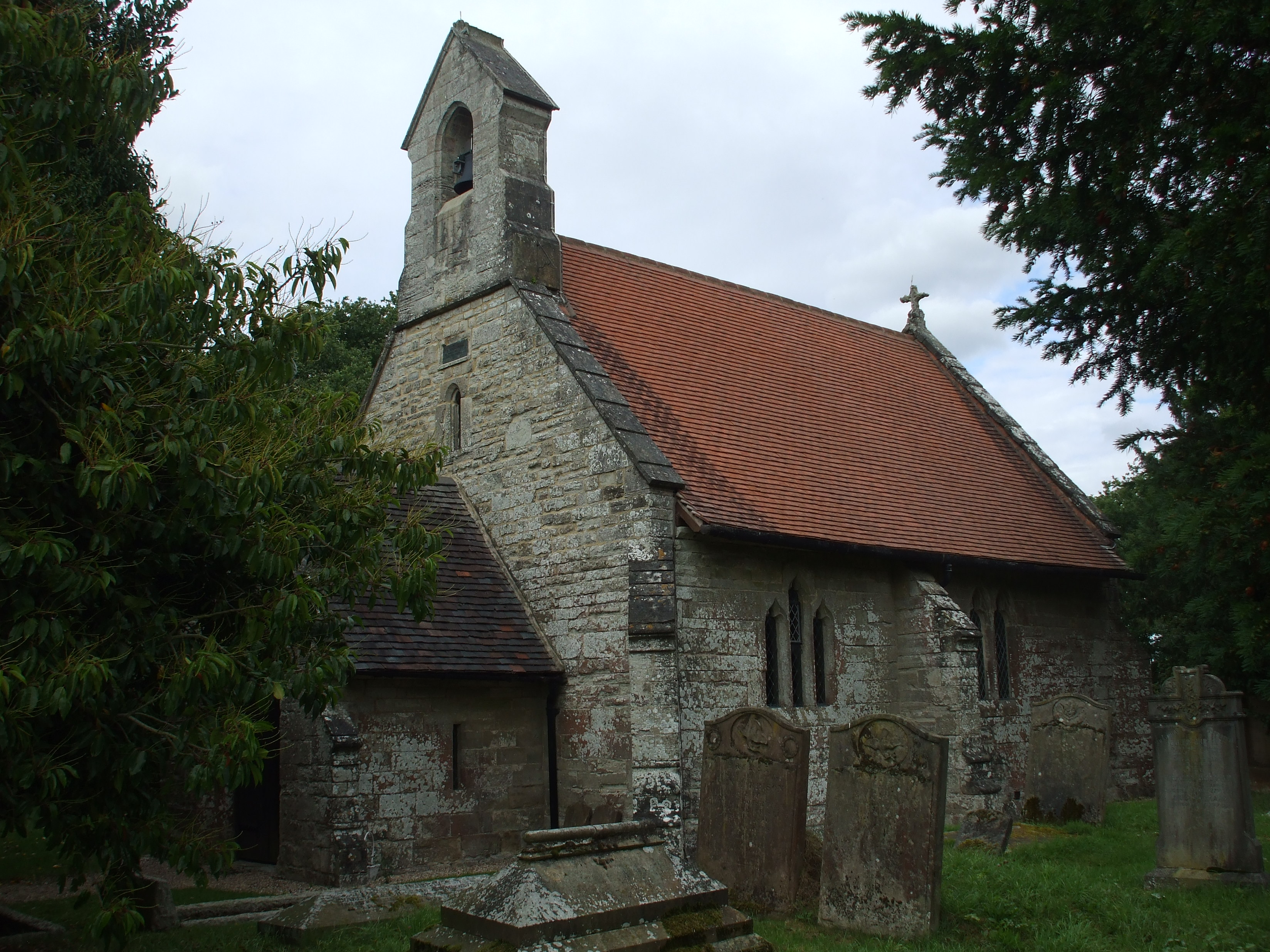
The Old Chapel, Ullenhall, Warwickshire

The name means Ulla's nook, the Old English word hahl, meaning a nook or corner of land, suggesting the hollow in which the village is situated, being compounded with a personal name of Scandinavian origin. The manor is recorded in the Domesday Book where it is listed as Holehale, one of the lands of Robert de Stafford. "In Ferncombe Hundred in Holehale (Ullenhall) 1 hide. Land for 15 ploughs. 17 villagers and 11 smallholders with 6 ploughs. Woodland ½ league long and 1 furlong wide. The value was and is £3 Waga held it." Waga, whose name is preserved in the nearby village of Wootton Wawen, was one of the witness's to Earl Leofric's, husband of Lady Godiva, foundation of the monastery at Coventry during the first year of the reign of Edward the Confessor (1042/3).

His lands extended beyond those at Ullenhall, but, following the Norman conquest, Ullenhall was bestowed by the Conqueror on Robert de Stafford, descended from the de Tonei family and who had fought stoutly with William the Conqueror against King Harold. He made Stafford his principal seat, where he had a strong castle and assumed his surname from thence. Ullenhall stands on lands that were originally part of the Barrells Hall estate. The earliest mention of Barrells was a reference to a Richard Barel in 1405. In 1554 the estate was purchased by Robert Knight of Beoley, 4 miles west of Ullenhall, and remained in the Knight family until 1856. An inventory taken in 1652 shows that it was then an ordinary farmhouse, and a member of the Knight family appeared in the 1682 Heralds' Visitation of Warwick.

The future 1st Earl, Robert Knight, Lord Luxborough, purchased Barrells Hall from a cousin in 1730. When Henrietta St John was banished to Barrells in 1736 it was still a relatively simple house, in very poor condition. When his son married in 1750 he commissioned the Italian architect Joseph Bonomi the Elder to build an imposing extension, which thereafter became the main house. On Henrietta's death in 1756 her husband rebuilt large parts of it. His wife Henrietta, Lady Luxborough, made the house the hub of a literary circle after her husband banished her to Barrells following a romantic indiscretion. She was one of the first to establish a ferme ornée and is credited with the invention of the word "shrubbery".

She was a prominent member of the Warwickshire Coterie, a group of poet friends including the poet William Shenstone, who had developed his own ferme ornée at The Leasowes in Halesowen, West Midlands. The family crest was a winged spur which gives its name to the village pub to this day. The Newtons owned the house after the Knights had extended it dramatically. However, the house was very seriously damaged by fire in 1933 and lay derelict until 2005 when it was restored as a family home. Despite its ancient roots, Ullenhall was not established as a separate Ecclesiastical Parish until June 1861 when the old manors of Apsley, Forde Hall and Mockley were also included in the parish.

== Governance ==
Ullenhall is part of the Tanworth in Arden ward of Stratford-on-Avon District Council and despite a strong local representation for the Green Party, is represented by Councillors Peter Oakley and George Atkinson, of the Conservative Party. Nationally it is part of Stratford-on-Avon parliamentary constituency, whose current MP is Nadhim Zahawi of the Conservative Party. It was included in the West Midlands electoral region of the European Parliament.

== Economy ==
The village is served by a public house, the Winged Spur, which takes its name from the Barrell family crest. There is a village hall and a tennis club.

== Notable buildings ==
The village has two churches. Situated on a hill to the north of the village is the old parish church of St Marys which is locally referred to as the Chapel. The oldest part of the building has been dated back to the 13th century but only the chancel of the original building now remains, to which a western porch has been added. There remain some ancient stained glass in the windows and some encaustic tiles in the floor. The font, of the 15th century, has an octagonal bowl with a moulded lower edge, and a plain stem. In the bowl one of the two staples remains. The memorials are to the knights of Barrells Hall and a coloured memorial to Sir Francis Throckmorton who died in 1554. The roof and tower were still under restoration at the turn of the 2000 millennium but at a service attended by 80 parishioners on the morning of 1 January 2000 the old bell was made to "ring in" the 21st century by throwing golf balls into the bell tower. The balls were recovered some years later when the restoration was completed.

The modern church of St Mary is down in the village and was constructed in 1875 at a cost of £5,000 to an odd idiosyncratic design by John Pollard Seddon in the Early English style by the three Newton brothers of Barrells Hall and Glencripesdale Estate in memory of their parents Mary and William Newton.

A significant local landmark is The Crowley Oak which can be located just outside the village heading towards the A435. It has ancient oak status according to the Woodland Trust, with a girth of over seven metres.

== Geography ==
The soil is clay, gravel, and marl and the subsoil keuper marl. The area of the ecclesiastical parish is 2,933 acres.
