= Glencripesdale Estate =

Coordinates: 56.668°N 5.807°W

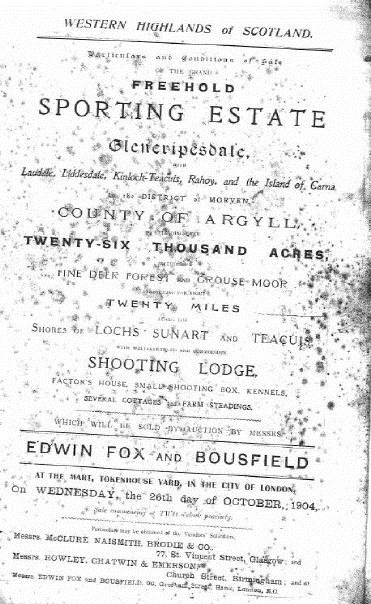
Cover of 1904 Sale brochure at 26,000 Acres

The Glencripesdale Estate is a country estate situated along the south side of Loch Sunart, a sea loch in the west highlands of Scotland.

Today, the Isle of Càrna is the last remaining part of a once huge 26,000-acre (110 km^{2}) acre deer forest, river and grousemoor bought in 1870 by the three Newton brothers, T. H. Goodwin, William III, and Canon Horace Newton of Barrells Hall and Holmwood, Redditch, ancestors of the current family, who are also of direct Milward's Needles descent.

== History ==
The Glencripesdale Estate once stretched for 20 miles (32 km) along the entire south side of Loch Sunart, and the entire east side of Loch Teacuis. The estate comprised the estates of Glencripesdale, Liddesdale and Laudale (16,000 acres) and also Rahoy and Kinlochteacus (10,000 acres). The total estate measured 41 square miles (110 km^{2}), with waterside access to over 20 miles (32 km) of coastline.

The highlight of the Estate was Glencripesdale House/Castle which was the mansion the Newton brothers built to house their family and staff.

During the three main months of Summer when the family were in occupation over 100 staff were employed locally running the estate covering its sporting side, Yachts and land and property management.

In 1904 the estate had 9,000 sheep grazing its land, and had 4 separate working farms, with 2,500 deer in the forest.

In the 1950s the Estate was put up for sale by the family, and sold for a distressed low price due to its vast size and the general worldwide economic downturn.

After World War II, a new owner bought the House, and stripped its lead off the roof, leaving the buildings shell exposed, because he was able to sell the lead for more than he had bought the property for, according to local legend.

The 600-acre (2.4 km^{2}) Isle of Càrna at the mouth of Loch Sunart was bought back by the family from the sale, and still remains within the family as a monument to the once great estate.

The last part of the Glencripesdale Estate to be sold by the family was the 7,000-acre (28 km^{2}) Rahoy estate by Carna and Loch Teacus which was sold to the Colville's in the mid 1960s.

The estate with the shell of the house was sold to the Forestry Commission next, which slowly planted up the woodland with conifers and then sold off the estate in chunks throughout the 1990s. The ruins still remain on the original site, however the land has become very overgrown.
