= Church of All Saints, Stroud =

Church of All Saints
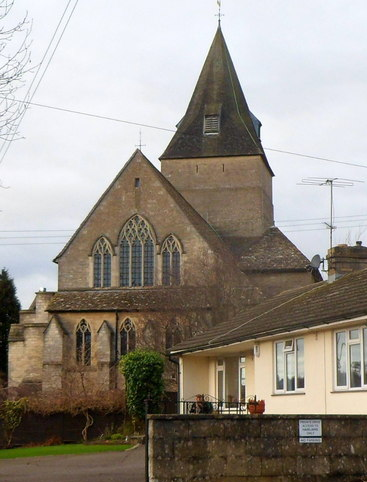
- Church of All Saints
- 51.7497°N 2.2096°W
- Location: Uplands, Stroud, Gloucestershire, GL5 1TU
- Country: England
- Denomination: Church of England

History
- Status: Active
- Dedication: All Saints
- Dedicated: May 1910

Architecture
- Functional status: Parish church
- Architect: Temple Moore
- Architectural type: Gothic Revival

Administration
- Diocese: Diocese of Gloucester
- Deanery: Archdeaconry of Gloucester
- Parish: Slad

The Church of All Saints is a Church of England parish church in the Uplands area of Stroud, Gloucestershire. The church is a Grade I listed building. It was designed by Temple Moore in the Gothic Revival style and was completed by Leslie Moore after Temple's death.
