= Calor Gas =

UK and Ireland Brand of bottled butane and propane

Calor Gas Ltd.
- Type: Private company
- Industry: Gas
- Founded: 1935
- Headquarters: Warwick, England
- Products: LPG, LNG & BioLPG
- Parent: SHV Gas Group
- Website: calor.co.uk

Calor is a brand of bottled butane and propane which is available in Britain and Ireland. It comes in cylinders, which have a special gas regulator.

The company was formed in 1935, and is one of the UK's largest suppliers of liquefied petroleum gas (LPG). It is currently servicing around 4 million homes and businesses, supplying LPG to power gas appliances from central heating and hot water, as well as cookers, fires and barbecues. The company predominantly supplies LPG to homes in rural areas where there is no mains natural gas supply. In the United Kingdom, Calor is part of the SHV Gas Group a private Dutch company. Calor originally dealt only with cooking and heating appliances, but now covers a wider range of products for home, business, and automotive fuels.

Such was the company's ubiquity at one point that the term "Calor Gas" became a generic term in the UK for all bottled LPG canisters and LPG-fuelled appliances.

== History ==
In 1934, Ritchie Gill, a Cornishman who had been working in the US, returned to England. He spotted an opportunity for a product successfully used in America – liquefied petroleum gas. Gill coined the name Calor Gas and in January 1935 he set up Modern Gas & Equipment Co. Ltd, based in London. In August 1935 the trade was transferred to the Calor (Distributing) Co. Limited.

The business expanded as people in rural areas of the UK realised the benefits of this new fuel – LPG. So by 1939 the company had six offices in the UK: a head office in London and five regional offices. Calor (Scotland) had been founded and in Ireland, Calor gas was being distributed by Messrs. McMullen Ltd., which was later purchased by Calor.

In 1947, there was an exceptionally hard winter which led to a major change in the way that Calor was distributed. Up to this point Calor had been relying upon rail transport for the distribution of the LPG. Calor signed a contract with PX (Carriers) Ltd., to deliver cylinders by road.

The first wholly owned filling plant was built at Saxham, near Bury St. Edmunds, Suffolk and a further two filling plants were built in the 1950s to give Calor even wider coverage. These two plants were at Millbrook near Southampton (1956) and Port Clarence near Middlesbrough (1959). The Millbrook filling plant was closed in 2001; however the sales and service centre remains, selling gas and gas appliances.

The 1950s saw the introduction of the Flavel B500 cooker, which used Calor gas; it became a great success story with caravan owners and smaller households.

1956 saw the birth of Calor's industrial division and installation of the first "bulk propane" tank at the Meredith & Drew biscuit factory in Newmarket.

In 1963 Calor Ltd. was formed. 1966 saw a new head office being acquired in Slough, which led to over 300 employees moving into this location.

In 1967, Calor was granted a royal warrant for the supply of liquefied petroleum gas to Elizabeth II. The company was later granted a second Warrant, this time for supplying Queen Elizabeth the Queen Mother.

In 1969 the Imperial Continental Gas Association acquired all the shares in the Company that it did not already own.

From the early 1970s onwards sales of cabinet heaters, and with them sales of butane in cylinders, escalated enormously, beginning with Super Ser which rapidly replaced the paraffin heater as the nation's number one choice for spot heating. In a decade, the market for cabinet heaters and the gas they burned grew from nothing to £100 million p.a. This led to increasing demand for storage space, which led to Calor investing in the two largest storage facilities. The first was purchased in 1976: a 30,000 tonne refrigerated storage tank at Felixstowe in Suffolk. The second was a joint venture with Conoco to excavate a vast cavern on South Humberside, capable of containing some 100,000 tonnes of gas supplied from an adjacent sea terminal. This facility, opened in 1985, gave Calor the ability to overcome short-term supply difficulties and to cope with major changes in demand brought on by extremes of weather.

During the 1980s, Calor's domestic central heating and industrial markets continued to expand and in 1982 the company's head office moved to a 40-acre (16 ha) site near Slough.

Despite great efforts to establish a nationwide network of outlets, Calor Autogas (vehicle propane) never quite reached expectations, due largely to the Government's inability to recognise its considerable environmental advantages by reducing duty. However, the fuel did become very popular for fork lift trucks, helped greatly by the launch, in 1989, of Calor's exhaust purification system, EPS2000, which enabled vehicles to be used both indoors and outside.

In 1986 the company's parent, Imperial Continental Gas Association plc, rejected a bid from Gulf Resources & Chemical Corporation, a company controlled by the Barclay brothers. Instead in 1987 Imperial Continental Gas Association broke itself up into Calor Group and Contibel (now owned by Tractebel).

In 1988 the privately owned Dutch company, SHV became a significant shareholder, acquiring 40% of Calor Group's equity.

In 1991, a joint venture company involving Calor, SHV and Primagaz (in which SHV holds a 50% stake) had been started in both Poland and Slovakia. This was then followed by Hungary in 1992. In 1997 SHV acquired the rest of Calor's shares.

In 2002 Calor opened 12 Customer Operations Centres at Grangemouth, Port Clarence, Stoney Stanton, Elland, Ellesmere Port, Coryton, Cranbrook, Saxham, Fawley, Neath, and Newbury.

In December 2005 The Canvey LNG project was announced which commenced with a feasibility study into the development of a strategic LPG import and regasification facility at the existing Calor LNG terminal at Canvey Island, Essex UK. The project is led by Calor Gas and also includes LNG Japan Corporation, (Joint Venture of Sumitomo Corporation and Sojitz Corporation). Following this study Centrica has now been selected as a gas supply partner and would hold equity in the facility, together with capacity rights enabling it to deliver supplies to their British Gas customers from a range of international sources. A full scale planning application and project plan is now being developed.

In January 2023, Calor announced it would discontinue its small capacity LPG cylinders. This caused alarm to caravanners and boaters whose gas installations were designed for these sizes. In May 2023, following representations from the RYA, the UK's Boat Safety Scheme and the wider boating and caravanning community, Calor made a statement that it would continue to exchange and refill serviceable 3.9kg propane and 4.5kg butane cylinders.

On 16 of February 2023 Calor announced workforce reduction of 114 positions in Commercial, Operations and Central Functions departments.

== Products ==
Calor provide gas both for use in bulk tanks (which may be stored above or below ground) and in smaller gas cylinders.

=== Bulk tanks ===
Calor can provide a variety of sizes in both above- and below-ground formats. Tanks are available with a monitor, which automatically inform Calor when stocks are low so that the gas can then be refuelled without intervention by the tank's owner.

=== Gas cylinders ===
Calor's largest cylinder (47 kg) can be used in packs (4 x 47 kg gas cylinders) which are able to supply central heating systems of up to 60 kW as well as cookers and fires. When one pair runs low the valve automatically switches to the second pair so that the supply is continuous.

For leisure use such as caravanning and barbecuing, Calor retail butane, propane and Patio Gas (an alternative brand name for propane) cylinders, all of which come in a number of sizes. A new Calor Lite cylinder, produced from lightweight steel, released in 2008, was targeted at the caravan market but has now been withdrawn due to production issues.

Calor also provides LPG for business customers.

== Calor Village of the Year ==
Calor fund and organise the Calor Village of the Year competition in England, Scotland, Wales and Northern Ireland, which over 1,000 villages enter every year.

Calor is a member of the Business in the Community 'PerCent Club' allegedly investing more than 1% of its pre-tax profit in community projects.

The first Calor UK Village of the Year 2008 was announced on 2 December 2008 as the Isle of Barra in the Western Isles of Scotland.
