= Holmwood, Redditch =

Country house in Worcestershire, England

Coordinates: 52°18′10″N 1°57′05″W

Holmwood House in Redditch, Worcestershire, is a country house built for Canon Horace Newton of Glencripesdale Estate and Barrells Hall in 1893 by the famed Victorian architect Temple Lushington Moore, who was a vague relative of the Newton family. Rev Canon Newton was brother of Goodwin Newton of Barrells Hall, where Canon Newton also grew up.

== Description ==
Holmwood features stunning classical inspired interiors, with a somewhat plainer outside.

Holmwood is laid out over 4 storeys, with basement, and features a hipped roof with dormer windows. It features 6 bay frontage with lead paned windows. It is a Grade II* listed building.

== Post Canon Newton occupation ==
In 1925, the house was sold to the Royal Antediluvian Order of Buffaloes before the town council run Redditch Development Corporation purchased the property, for the headquarters of its organisation turning Redditch into a "New Town". Large amounts of the 26-acre (110,000 m^{2}) grounds have been developed upon, meaning that the house no longer has the gardens and land it was built with. The house was owned by Redditch Development Corporation up until 1985.

== Holmwood today - residential apartments ==
Circa 1989, it was converted by Bovis Homes Group into grand residential apartments, retaining the original stone mullioned windows, ornate ceilings, wood panelling and impressive fireplaces.

== See also ==
- List of miscellaneous works by Temple Moore
