= Loch Sunart =

Sea loch in highland, Scotland

Loch Sunart MPA
- IUCN category IV (habitat/species management area)
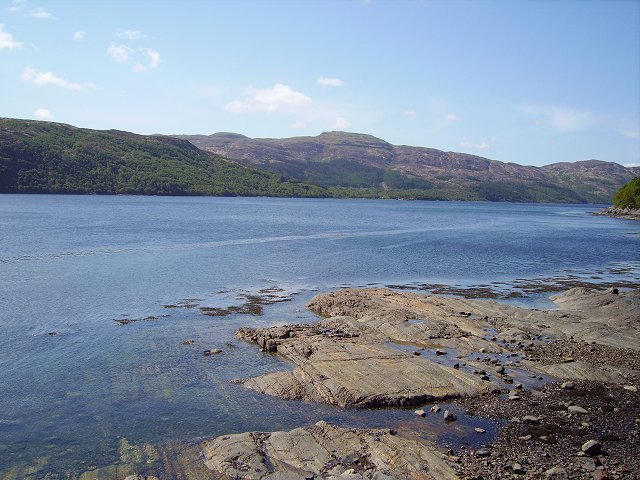
- Looking south over Loch Sunart to Morvern

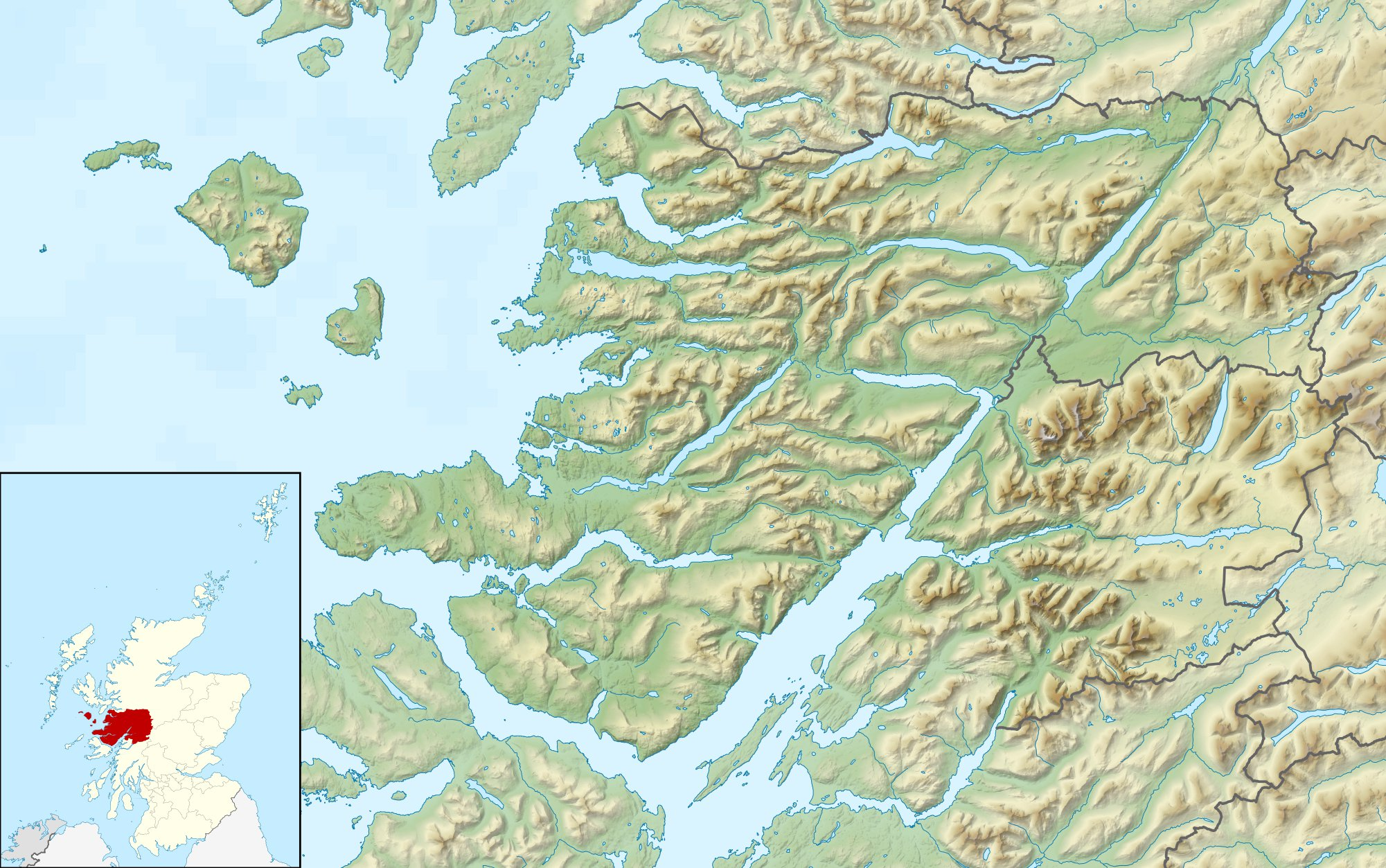
- Location within Lochaber
- Location: Lochaber, Scotland
- Coordinates: 56.7001°N 5.7569°W
- Area: 4,900 ha (19 sq mi)
- Designation: Scottish Government
- Established: 2014
- Operator: Marine Scotland

Loch Sunart (Scottish Gaelic Loch Shuaineart) is a sea loch on the west coast of Scotland. Loch Sunart is bounded to the north by the Sunart district of Ardnamurchan and to the south by the Morvern district. At 31 kilometres (19 mi) long, it is the longest sea loch in the Highland local government area. The maximum depth of the loch is 124 metres (407 ft), east of Càrna and near the entrance to Loch Teacuis. Other islands in the loch include Oronsay, seaward of Càrna, Risga, which lies between the two larger islands, and Eilean Mòr, which lies towards the landward end of the loch in line with Beinn Resipol.

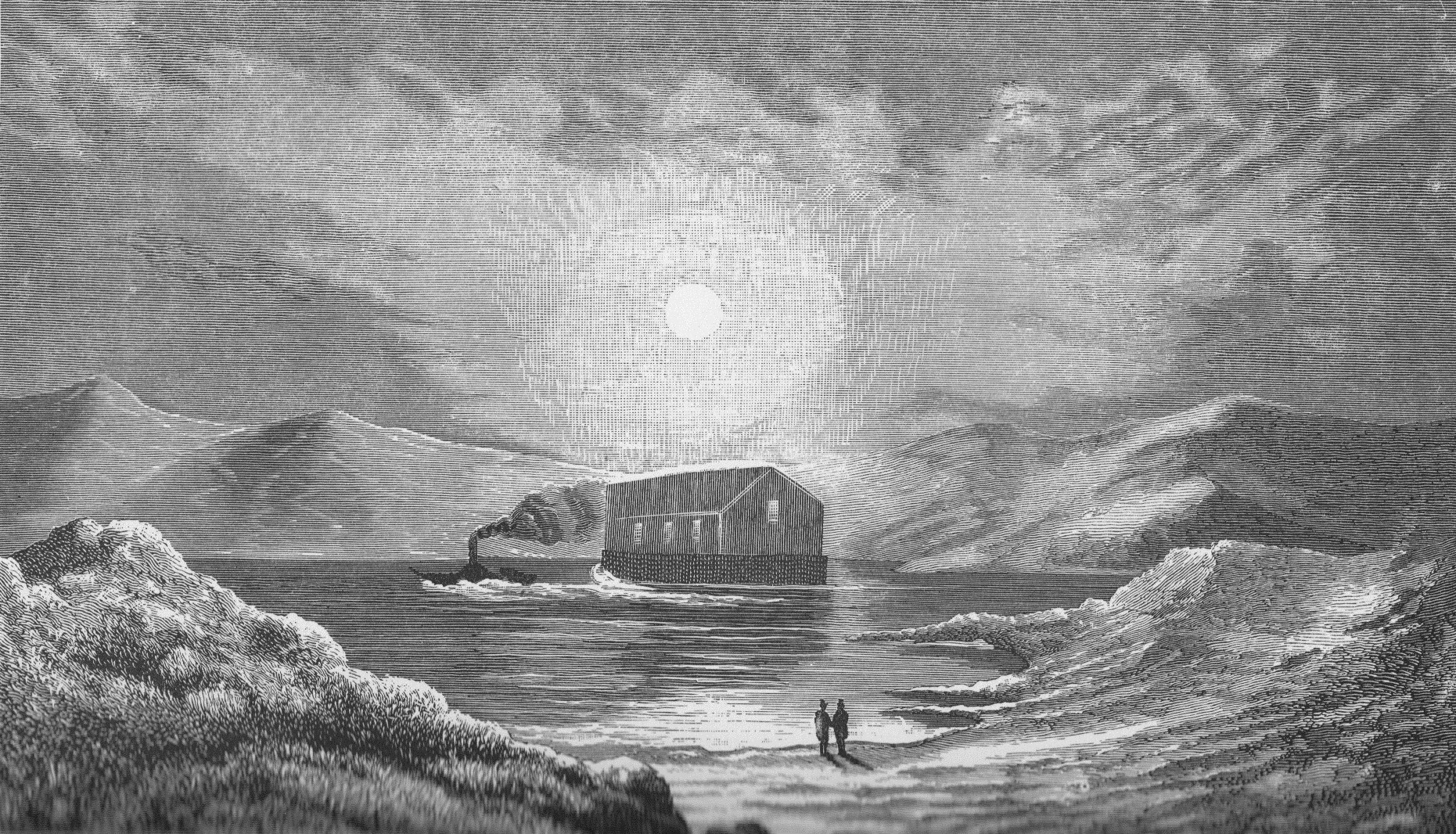
Towing the Iron Church into Loch Sunart

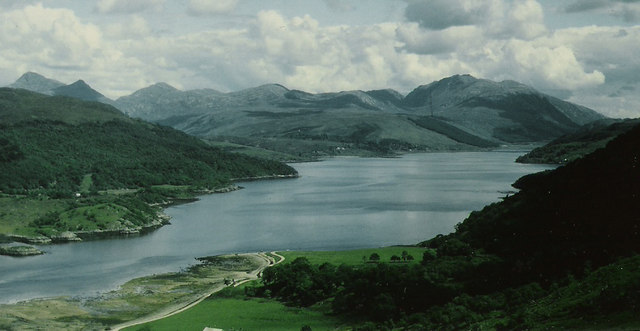

A considerable part of the loch is leased for aquaculture, with fish farming, originally only of salmon but now somewhat diversified, being established in the 1980s.

A local legend holds that the absence of resident swans in Loch Sunart is the result of a doomed love affair between a Celtic chieftain and a local girl. When his mother, who opposed a marriage, turned her into a swan to thwart their love, the young man accidentally killed the swan while hunting. On learning of the swan's real identity he killed himself to join the swan at the bottom of the loch, which swans supposedly have shunned ever since.

Part of the shoreline of the loch is Eilean a‘ Mhuirich, a tidal island, part of Ardnastang beach, approximately a mile along the A891 from Strontian. Also known as Cumwhelpington Island, local legend has it that if you were caught on the island by the incoming tide, you would need to hide from ravens, which were actually the Baobhan Sith - a malevolent female fairy in Scottish Highlands folklore.

At the Disruption the local landlord refused the Free Church permission to build a church on his land. The solution of Graham Speirs was to build a floating iron church. After delays this was completed and towed into place starting on Wednesday 8 July 1846. At the cost of slight inconvenience to the congregation, a mooring was chosen below the township of Ardnastang, in the bay of Eilean a’Mhuirich, about 1 1/4 miles (2 km) west of Strontian. By three o’clock on the Friday afternoon, she was safely moored about 150 yards (140 m) offshore. The church being ready for public worship the congregation were ferried out that Sunday morning between the hours of ten and twelve. A large blue flag flew from the church bearing in large characters the inscription “An Eaglais Shaor”.

In 2014 the entire loch (an area of 4,900 hectares or 12,000 acres) was declared a Nature Conservation Marine Protected Area (NCMPA), to protect features including flame shell beds and Leptometra celtica population. Serpulid beds are also present here, as are organisms such as sponges, starfish and brittlestars. The MPA is designated a Category IV protected area by the International Union for Conservation of Nature. Within the MPA the use of fishing gear is generally prohibited, although creeling is permitted in certain parts of the loch.

The loch also forms part of a larger 74,100-hectare (183,000-acre) NCMPA, entitled Loch Sunart to the Sound of Jura, which extends to include the Sound of Mull, the Firth of Lorne and the Sound of Jura. This MPA has been designated to protect the population of common skate and the area's quaternary geological features.
