= Bryn Bras Castle =

Grade II* listed country house in Gwynedd, Wales

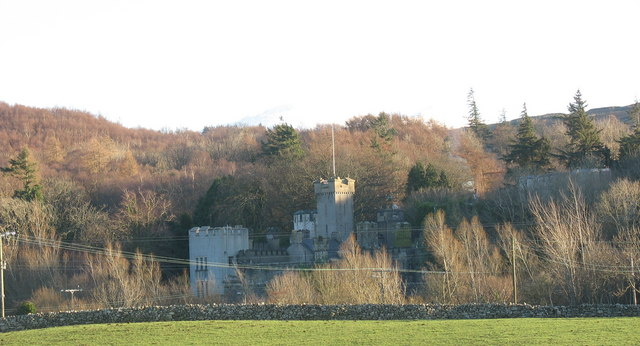

- Location within Gwynedd
- 53.1404°N 4.1789°W
- Type: House and garden
- Location: Llanrug

Site notes
- Architect: Thomas Hopper
- Architectural style: Romanesque Revival
- Governing body: Privately owned

Cadw/ICOMOS Register of Parks and Gardens of Special Historic Interest in Wales
- Official name: Bryn Bras
- Designated: 1 February 2022
- Reference no.: PGW(Gd)41(GWY)

Listed Building – Grade II*
- Official name: Bryn Bras Castle
- Designated: 29 May 1968
- Reference no.: 3804

Listed Building – Grade II
- Official name: Gladiator statue (north) at Bryn Bras Castle
- Designated: 29 August 1999
- Reference no.: 22259

Listed Building – Grade II
- Official name: Gladiator statue (south) at Bryn Bras Castle
- Designated: 29 August 1999
- Reference no.: 22260

Listed Building – Grade II
- Official name: Pan figure and pool in walled 'knot' garden at Bryn Bras Castle
- Designated: 29 August 1999
- Reference no.: 22258

Bryn Bras Castle is a Grade II* listed country house located on the old road between Llanrug and Llanberis in Caernarfon, Gwynedd. The house, which remains privately owned, is a Grade II* listed building and its gardens and landscaped park are listed at Grade II on the Cadw/ICOMOS Register of Parks and Gardens of Special Historic Interest in Wales.

== History ==
The castle was built in a neo-Romanesque style between 1829 and 1835 on the site of an earlier structure by architect Thomas Hopper for Thomas Williams (1795–1874), a lawyer. It was bought in 1897 by Capt. Frank Stewart Barnard, High Sheriff of Caernarvonshire for 1903–04, who stayed at the castle until his death in 1917, running it as a stud. It was later owned by the oil millionaire Duncan Elliot Alves (1870–1938), who was Mayor of Caernarvon for six years and High Sheriff of the county for 1931–32. After Alves' death in 1938 the estate changed hands a number of times and much of the surrounding land was sold off. The site of the first motorcycle Dragon rally in 1962, the house has been converted into apartments.

== Architecture and description ==
The castle is a Grade II* listed building. Two elements of the castle's structure have their own listings, the boundary walls and the gates and turrets. The gardens are designated Grade II on the Cadw/ICOMOS Register of Parks and Gardens of Special Historic Interest in Wales. A number of features within the gardens have their own listings; a pair of statues of gladiators, a statue of the god Pan in a pool, and the knot garden in which it stands, and an observatory.
