= Temple Moore =

English architect (1856–1920)

Temple Lushington Moore
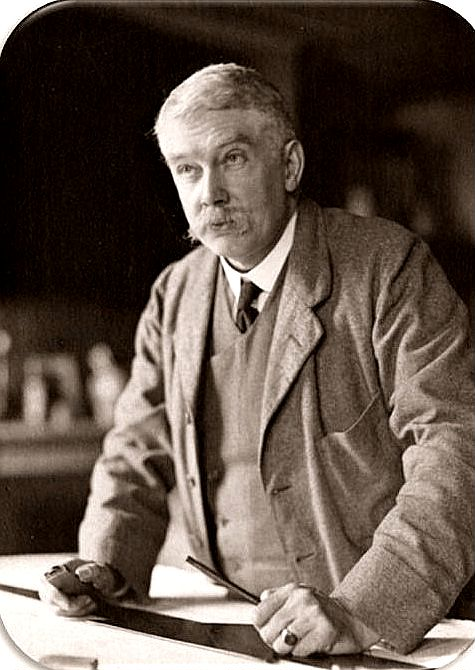
- Temple Lushington Moore
- Born: 7 June 1856; Tullamore, County Offaly, Ireland
- Died: 30 June 1920 (aged 64); Hampstead, London, England
- Occupation: Architect
- Buildings: St Wilfrid's Church, Harrogate; All Saints' Church, Stroud

Temple Lushington Moore (7 June 1856 – 30 June 1920) was an English architect who practised in London but whose work can be seen across England, particularly in the North. He is famous for a series of fine Gothic Revival churches built between about 1890 and 1917 and also restored many churches and designed church fittings. He did some work on domestic properties, and also designed memorial crosses.

== Life and career ==
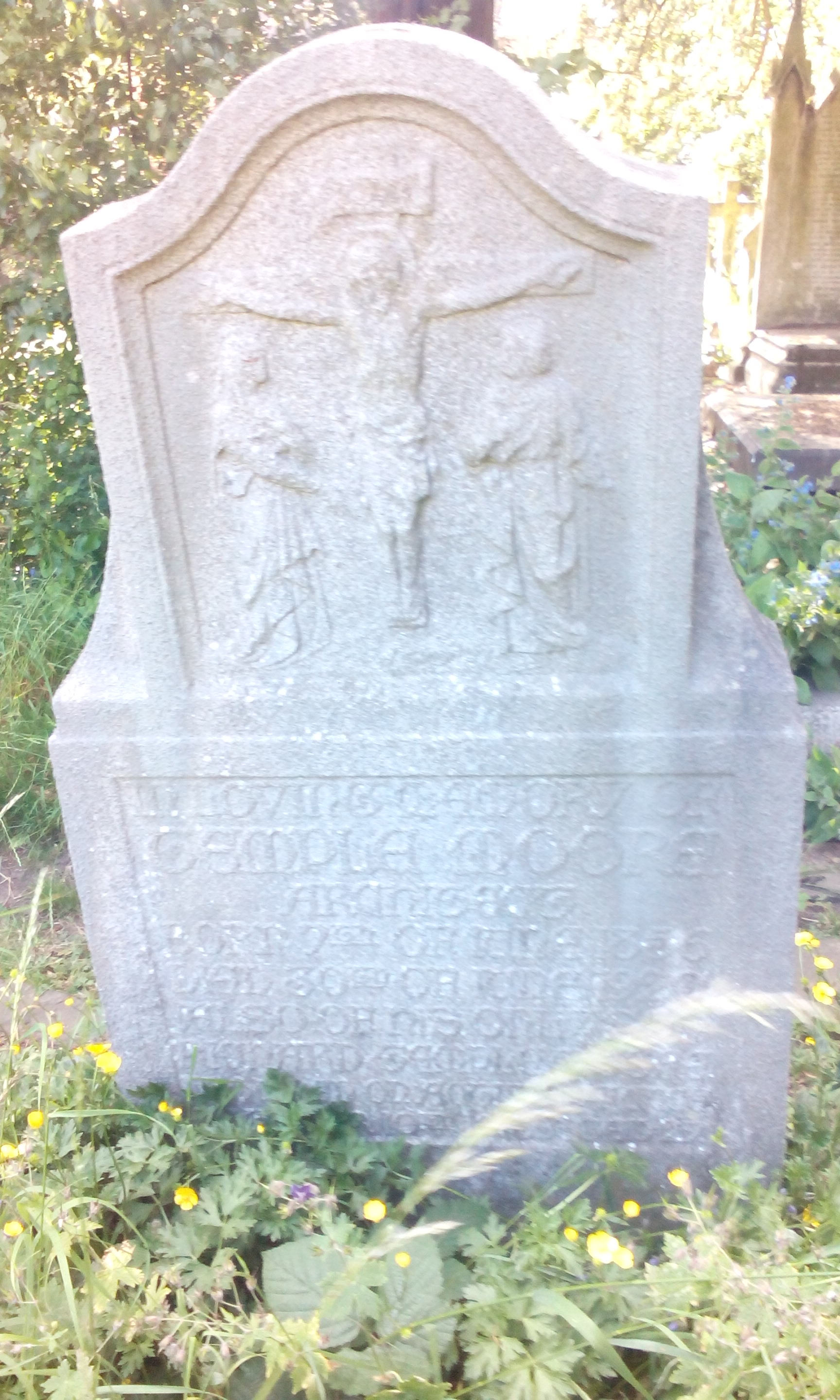
Moore's tombstone, also commemorating his son Richard Moore, lost in 1918 in the sinking of the RMS Leinster

Temple Moore was born in Tullamore, County Offaly, Ireland, and was the son of an army officer. He was educated at Glasgow High School, then from 1872 privately by the Revd Richard Wilton in Londesborough in the East Riding of Yorkshire. In 1875, he moved to London and was articled to architect George Gilbert Scott, Jr. Although Moore set up his own practice in 1878, he continued to work closely with Scott, helping to complete his works when Scott's health deteriorated. From the early 1880s he travelled widely studying buildings on the continent, chiefly in Germany, France and Belgium. He was particularly impressed by the great medieval brick churches of north Germany, echoes of which can be found in some of his own impressively austere designs.

In 1884 Moore married Emma Storrs Wilton, the eldest daughter of the Rev. Wilton and thus became related to Canon Horace Newton; for whom he undertook church restoration work and a large house, Holmwood, Redditch, Worcestershire. Moore's pupils included Giles Gilbert Scott, son of George Gilbert Scott, Jr.

In 1905 he was elected a Fellow of the Royal Institute of British Architects. Moore's only son, Richard (1891–1918), was articled to his father and it was expected that he would continue the practice. He was killed in 1918 when RMS Leinster was torpedoed and sunk off Dublin. Temple Moore's son-in-law Leslie Thomas Moore joined the practice during the following year.

Temple Moore lived his later life in Hampstead, in Downshire Hill and then at 46 Well Walk, where he died in 1920. He was buried in the churchyard of St John's Church, Hampstead, which he had altered in 1912. His estate amounted to a little over £5,635 (equivalent to £220,000 in 2025). Leslie Moore continued the practice, completing some of Temple Moore's commissions.

== Works ==
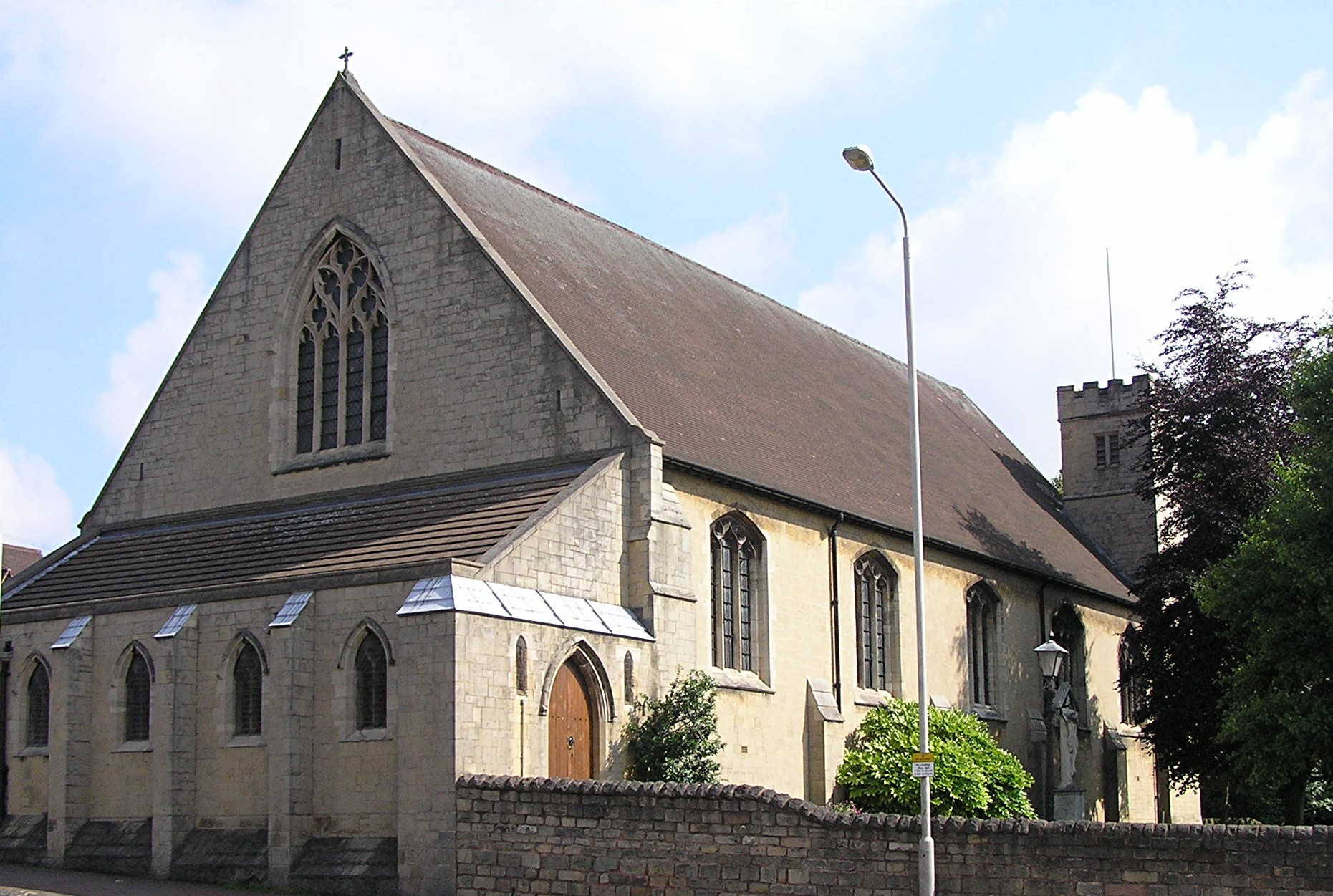
St Mark's Church, Mansfield, listed at Grade II*

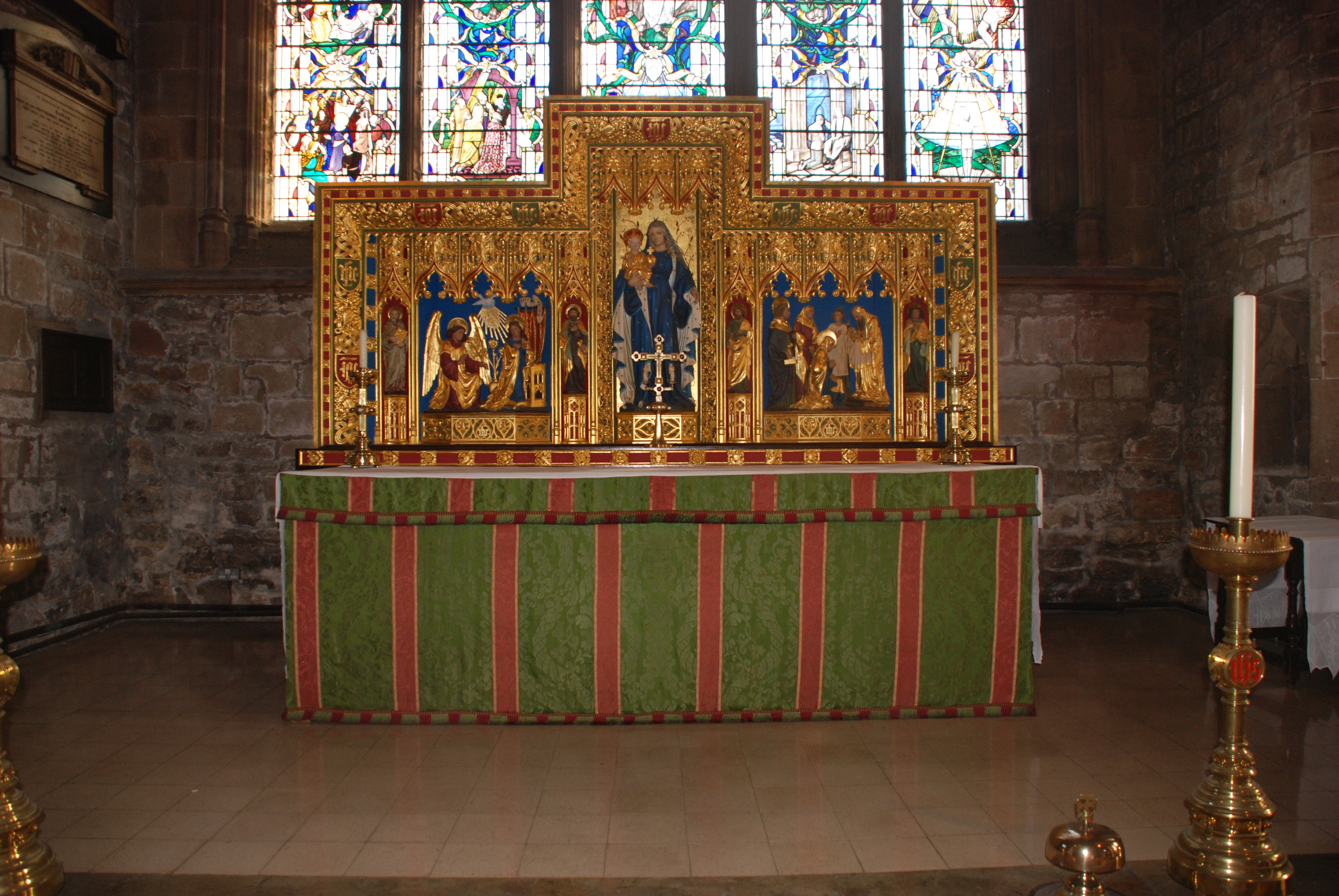
The high altar in the Church of St Mary and All Saints, Chesterfield showing the reredos designed by Temple Moore

Moore's main contributions to architecture were his churches; he designed about 40 new churches, and All Saints' Cathedral, Nairobi. He also restored older churches, and made alterations and additions to others. In addition he designed fittings and items of furniture for the interiors of churches. In other fields, he designed and altered country houses, and other buildings including schools, vicarages, parish halls, a court house, and memorial and churchyard crosses. He was also a contributor to English Domestic Architecture of the XVII & XVIII Centuries by Horace Field and Michael Bunney (1905).

In 1907, Moore redesigned the nave at Hexham Abbey. In 1908, Moore made the organ case, choir stalls, reredos and communion rail for St Michael and All Angels Church, Badminton.

Moore's career spanned the closing years of the Gothic Revival, but he developed the style rather than merely continuing it. In his entry in the Oxford Dictionary of National Biography the author states that his "artistic destiny was not to preserve an attenuating tradition but to bring to maturity a development which otherwise would have remained incomplete", and also expresses the opinion that he was "England's leading ecclesiastical architect from the mid-Edwardian years". Of his work, the architectural historian Nikolaus Pevsner said that he "is always sensitive in his designs and often interesting". Moore was an Anglican in the Anglo-Catholic tradition, which prefers its churches to have beautiful surroundings and fine fittings to enhance worship; Moore's designs reflect this.

The National Heritage List for England shows that at least 34 of Moore's new churches are designated as listed buildings. Two of these, St Wilfrid's Church, Harrogate, and the Church of All Saints, Stroud, are listed at Grade I, and at least 16 of the others are at Grade II*. (Note: There are three grades of listing. Grade I buildings are "of exceptional interest, sometimes considered to be internationally important", Grade II* buildings are "particularly important buildings of more than special interest", and Grade II listing is given to "Buildings of national importance and special interest".) For his secular works, Moore received praise from his contemporaries for remodelling South Hill Park in Berkshire, and for restoring the Treasurer's House and St William's College in York.

== See also ==
- List of new churches by Temple Moore
- List of church restorations and alterations by Temple Moore
- List of church fittings and furniture by Temple Moore
- List of miscellaneous works by Temple Moore

== Sources ==
- Allsopp, Bruce; Clark, Ursula (1969). Historic Architecture of Northumberland. Newcastle upon Tyne: Oriel Press. ISBN 0 85362 062 8.
