= Duncombe Park =

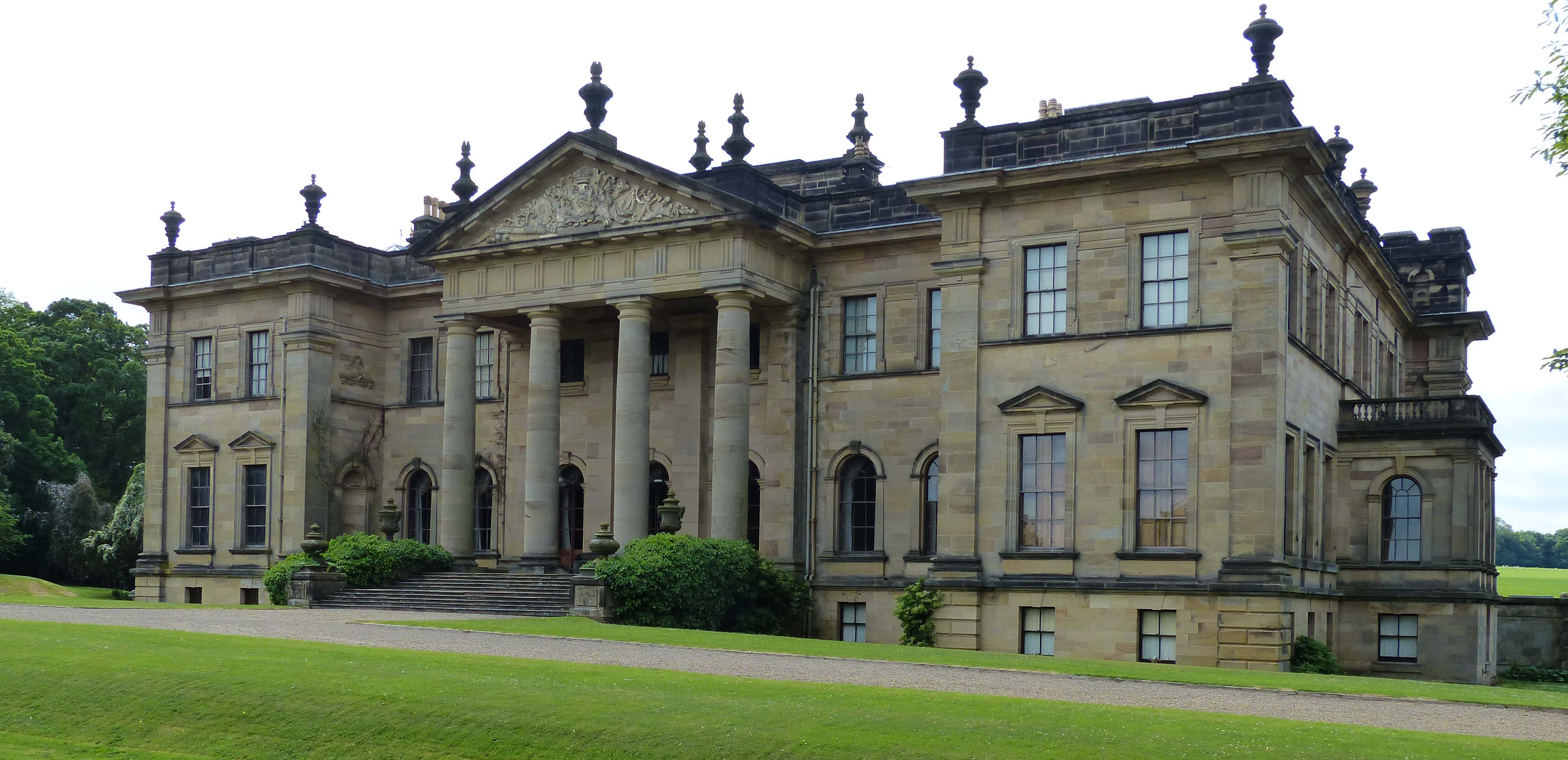
- Duncombe Park in 2017
- Interactive map of the Duncombe Park area

General information
- Type: Stately home
- Location: Helmsley, North Yorkshire YO62 5EB, England
- Coordinates: 54°14′20″N 1°04′29″W
- Completed: 1713
- Owner: Feversham Estate

Technical details
- Grounds: 450 acres (182 ha)

Design and construction
- Architects: William Wakefield; Charles Barry (1843); William Young (1895)

Website
- www.duncombepark.com

Listed Building – Grade I
- Designated: 4 January 1955
- Reference no.: 1295358

National Register of Historic Parks and Gardens
- Designated: 10 May 1984
- Reference no.: 1001061

Duncombe Park is the seat of the Duncombe family who previously held the title Earls of Feversham. The title became extinct on the death of the 3rd Earl in 1963, since when the family have continued to hold the title Baron Feversham. The park is situated one mile south-west of Helmsley, North Yorkshire, England and stands in 300 acres (120 ha) of parkland. The estate has a commanding location above deeply incised meanders of the River Rye within the North York Moors National Park.

The house was completed in 1713 for Thomas Duncombe (born Thomas Brown) to designs by the Yorkshire gentleman-architect William Wakefield. It was remodelled in 1843 by Sir Charles Barry. In 1879 the main block was gutted by fire and remained a ruin until 1895 when rebuilding was carried out by William Young. The reconstruction was based on the original design, though there were changes made, especially in the interior layout to meet contemporary needs. It is of two storeys with a basement and attic.

The house itself is not open to the public but visitors are allowed into the 30-acre (12 ha) garden from April until the end of August.

== History ==
In 1694 Charles Duncombe, one of the richest commoners in England, bought the 40,000-acre (16,000 ha) Helmsley estate, occasionally staying at the castle. After his death in 1711 it passed to his sister Ursula and from her to her son Thomas Brown, who changed his name to Thomas Duncombe and commissioned the building of the present house. On his death in 1746 it passed to his son, Thomas Duncombe II, who extended the grounds to include the Rievaulx Terrace. In 1774, Anne Duncombe, daughter of Thomas Duncombe of Duncombe Park was married to Robert Shafto, of Whitworth Hall, near Spennymoor, County Durham, the famous "Bonny Bobby Shaftoe" of the folk song.

In the late 1700s the estate was owned by Thomas' son, Charles Slingsby Duncombe, who was succeeded in 1803 by his eldest son and heir Charles Duncombe, 1st Baron Feversham. Charles was MP for Shaftesbury, Aldborough, Heytesbury and Newport IoW and High Sheriff of Yorkshire for 1790–91. He built up a considerable art collection at the house and was made 1st Baron Feversham in 1826. His son William succeeded him and was MP for Yorkshire and after 1832 for the new North Riding constituency. William's son William Ernest was created the 1st Earl of Feversham. The second Earl was killed in the First World War and the earldom became extinct on the death of the third earl in 1963.

The building was used as a girls' school between 1914 and 1980. The Rievaulx Terrace and Temples were acquired by the National Trust in 1972. After 1985 the house was restored as a family home by the 6th Baron Feversham, but on his death in 2009 it was left not to his heir Jasper Duncombe, 7th Baron Feversham, but to a younger son Jake Duncombe.

The house closed to the public in 2011. In March 2013 the National Centre for Birds of Prey opened a branch in the grounds.

== Historic listing designations ==
The house and a number of structures on the Duncombe estate are listed by Historic England. Buildings are listed at one of three grades, I, II* and II, for their architectural and/or historical importance. The house itself is listed at Grade I. The other Grade I buildings include the gates and railings which front the entrance court to the house, the Northern and Southern stable blocks, and the Ionic and Tuscan Temples in the park. The park itself is also listed at Grade I on the Register of Historic Parks and Gardens of Special Historic Interest in England. The former laundry, now the visitors centre for the National Centre for Birds of Prey, and the ha-ha are listed at Grade II*. An ice house, and orangery and a sundial depicting Father Time are listed at Grade II.

=== Ionic Temple ===
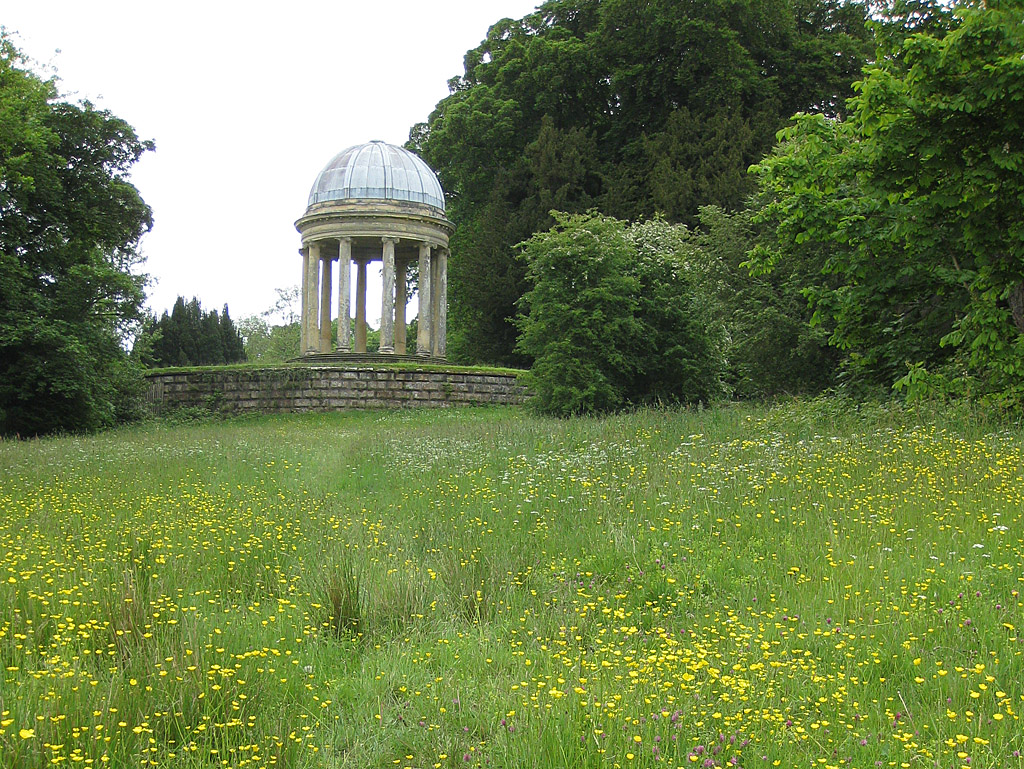
The Ionic Temple, with part of the ha-ha below

The temple is built of sandstone, and has a domed lead roof, and a circular plan. It consists of an open rotunda, with a stepped podium and nine unfluted Ionic columns, an architrave, a frieze and a dentilled cornice. It is grade I listed and was built in about 1720.

=== Tuscan Temple ===
The grade I-listed temple was built around 1730. It is constructed of sandstone with a lead roof, and is in Palladian style. It has a circular plan, and is surrounded by Tuscan columns on a stepped podium. Within it is a room with a doorway, three sash windows, a plain frieze and a moulded cornice. This is surmounted by a circular drum containing a circular window and with a hemispherical lead-covered dome.

=== Northern Stable Block ===
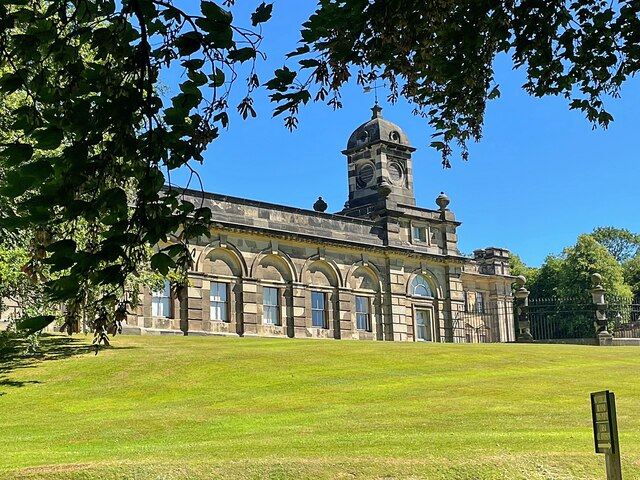
The Northern Stable Block

The stable block was designed by Charles Barry and completed in 1846. It is built of sandstone, and forms an open courtyard with a quadrant wall to the east. There is one storey and an attic, and seven bays The outer bays are flanked by rusticated pilasters, and contain round-arched recesses, with semicircular windows above. The central bays form an arcade of round arches with keystones, and above is a dentilled cornice and a blank parapet. The corners rise to attics with corner urns. At the left is a clock tower with a curved pyramidal roof and a weathervane.

=== Southern Stable Block ===
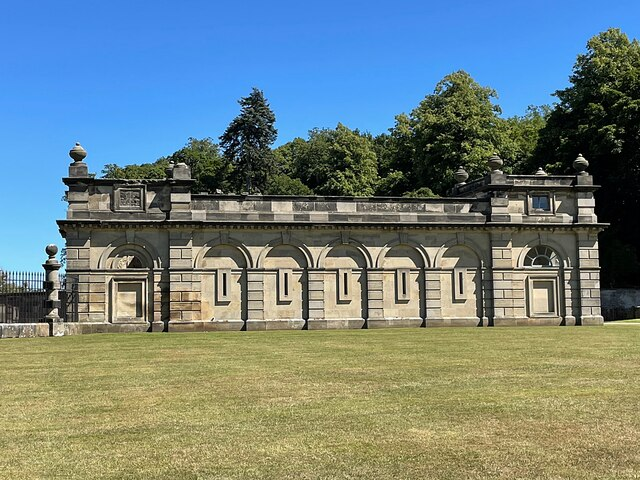
The Southern Stable Block

The stable block was also designed by Barry and completed in 1846. It is attached to the house by a quadrant wall. It is built of sandstone, with a dentilled cornice, a parapet, and urns at the corners. It has one storey and attics, and a square plan with ranges around an open courtyard. The front has seven bays, the outer bays flanked by rusticated pilasters, and containing round-headed recesses with keystones, above which are semicircular windows. The central bays form a round-arched arcade with rusticated pilasters and keystones. The attics contain casement windows.

=== Laundry ===
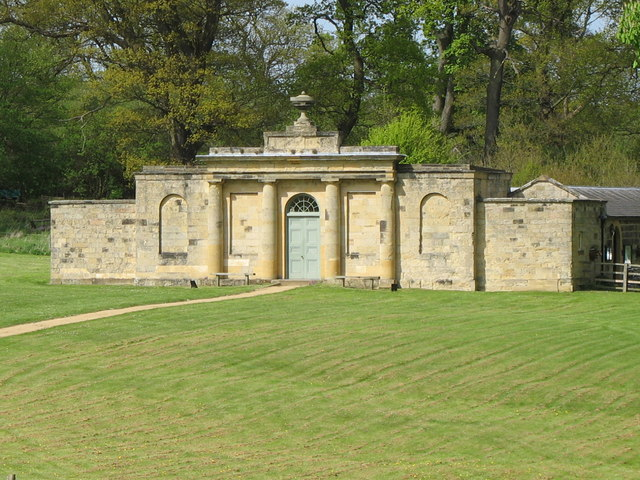
The former laundry

The grade II*-listed former laundry dates from about 1730. It is built of sandstone, and has a rectangular courtyard plan with one storey. In the centre is a doorway with a radial fanlight, flanked by four attached Tuscan columns, with an entablature and a stepped pediment. Between these are blind panels within colonnades. Outside, there are blank round-headed recesses under moulded cornices, flanked by low plain walls.

=== Ha-ha ===
The ha-ha wall in the grounds of the house is built of sandstone, and consists of four to five rusticated courses with capstones. It curves, and runs from the northern stable block to the Ionic temple.It is unusual as an example of a retaining wall with decorative stonework. Its date of construction is unconfirmed; some sources describe it as "England's first ha-ha".

=== Orangery ===
The grade II-listed orangery was completed in 1751. It was designed by Robert Richardson Banks and Charles Barry, and is built of sandstone, rusticated on the front, with a dentilled cornice and a plain parapet with urns. There is a single storey and eleven bays. The main central part has three bays and a flat roof, and contains three round-arched windows separated by Corinthian pilasters, paired on the corners. The four-bay wings are of half the height, and are roofless. They contain square unglazed window openings, between which are rusticated pilasters carrying a cornice.

=== Nelson Gate ===
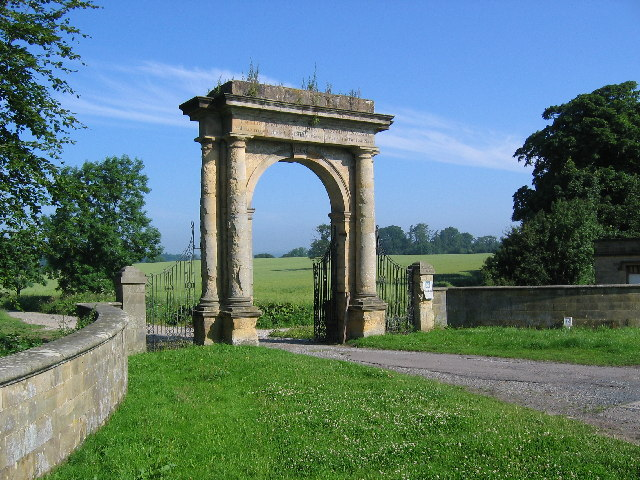
Nelson Gate

A triumphal arch forming a gateway at the entrance to the grounds from the A170 road. It consists of a round-headed arch with Tuscan columns, imposts, a moulded cornice, and a dated keystone. On the arch are inscriptions commemorating the achievements of Lord Nelson.

=== Gates and railings ===
The grade I-listed gates and railings were designed by Barry and completed about 1845. The gates and railings were designed by Charles Barry. They are made of wrought iron, and are supported by rusticated Tuscan columns with ball finials. The gate posts are in sandstone and consist of plain drum columns supporting plain entablatures carrying a horse on the left, and a lion to the right, both bearing arms, and clasped by four rusticated Tuscan columns with ball finials.

== Ryedale Show ==
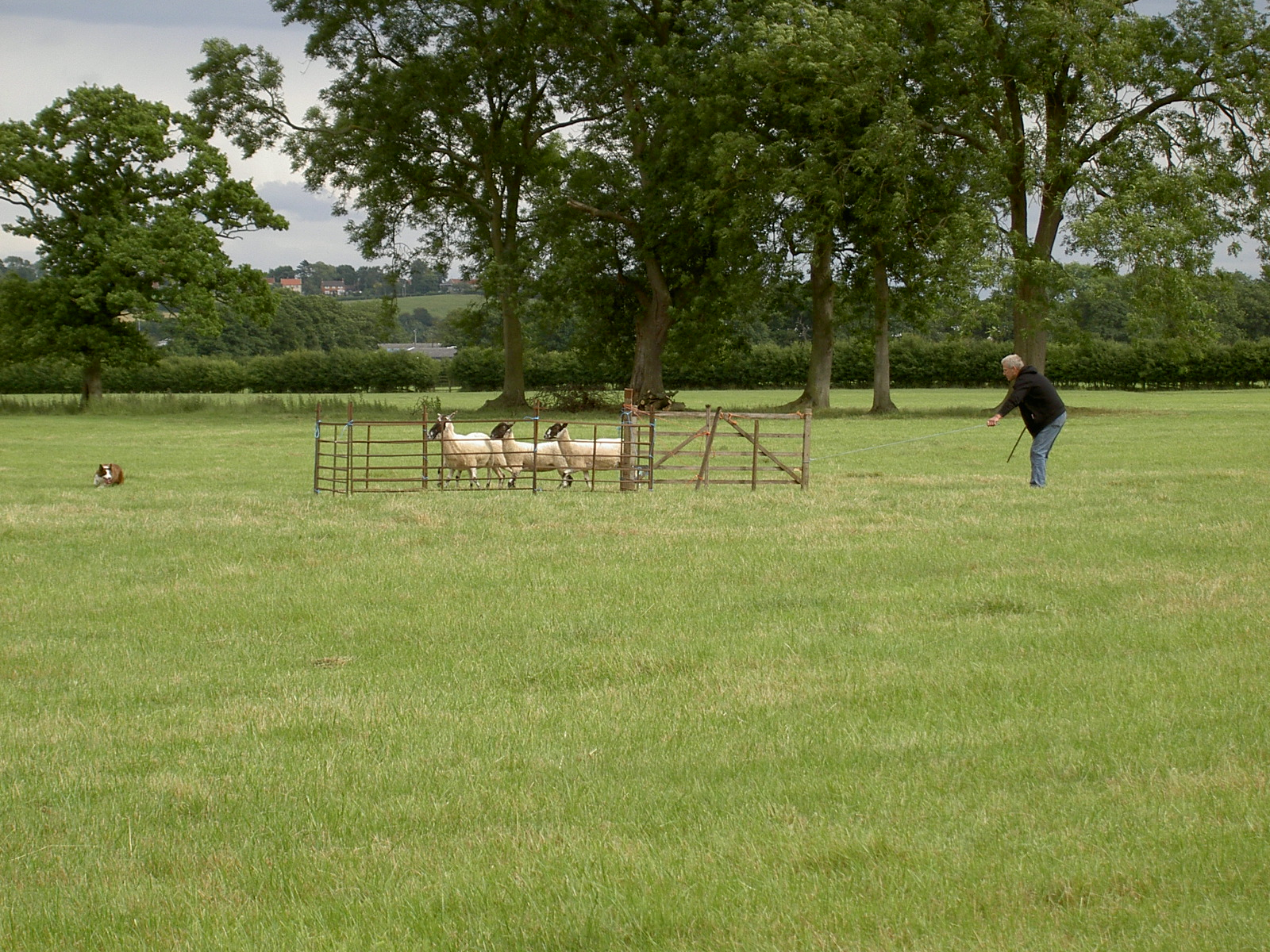
Showground (2010)

The Ryedale Show is an agricultural show which takes place at Duncombe Park annually on the last Tuesday of July. It is organised and run by the Ryedale Agricultural Society. In recent years the Ryedale Show has become the largest one-day agricultural show in the north of England.

Established in 1855, the show has run almost continuously for over one hundred-and-fifty years. It features several agricultural show staples such as features of equestrianism and competition between farmers as to the quality of Livestock. In 2007 the show was cancelled for only the second time ever because of torrential rain the preceding week and a waterlogged show field. It was cancelled in 2020 because of the COVID-19 pandemic.

== See also ==
- Grade I listed buildings in North Yorkshire (district)
- Listed buildings in Helmsley
- Listed buildings in Rievaulx

== Gallery ==
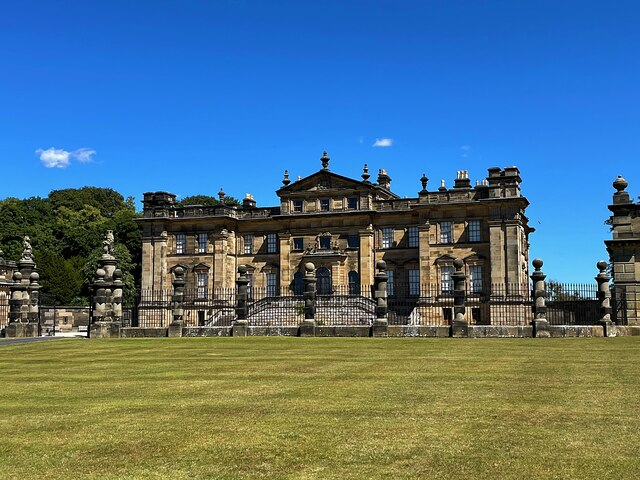
The forecourt gates and railings

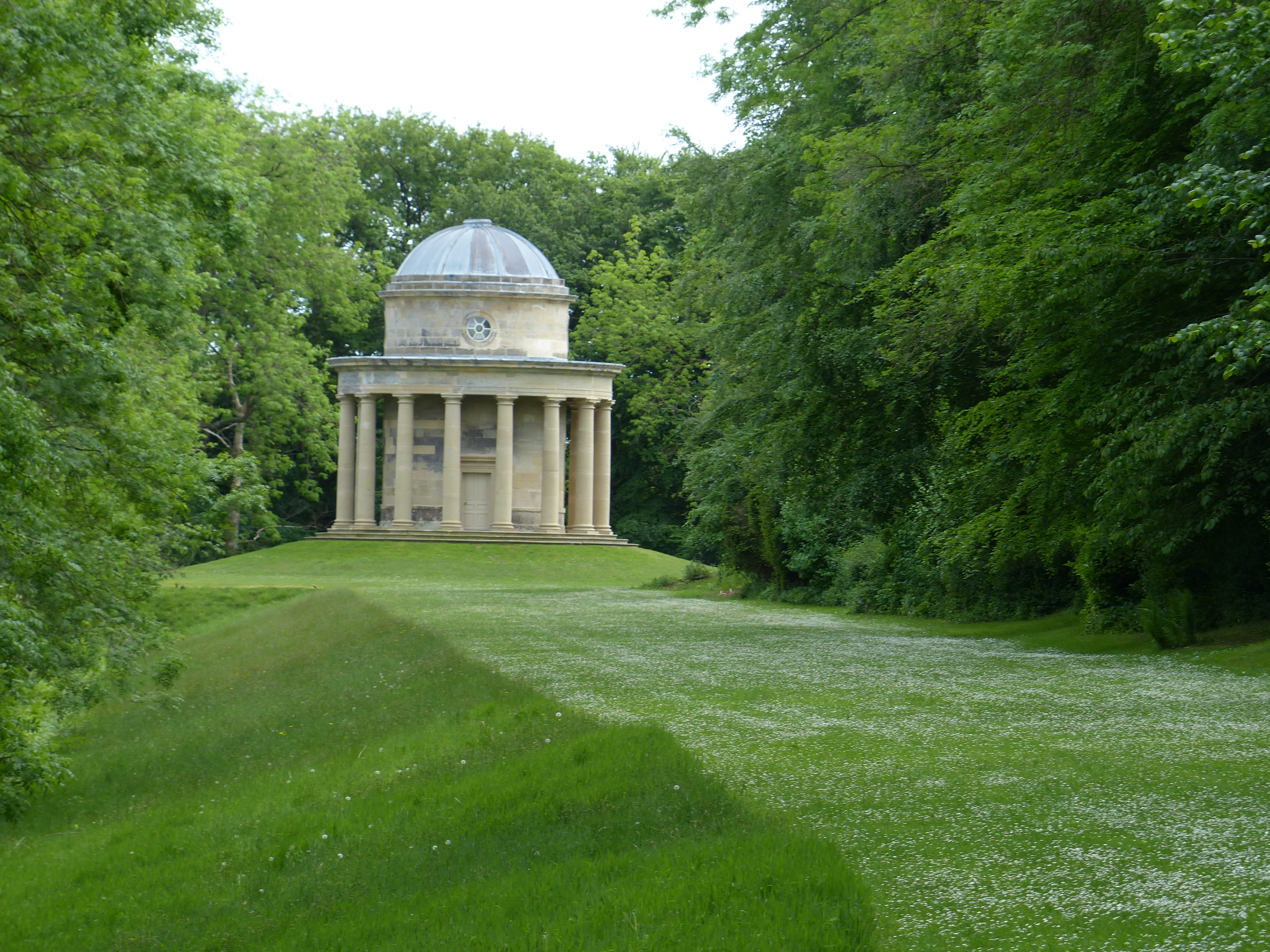
The Tuscan Temple

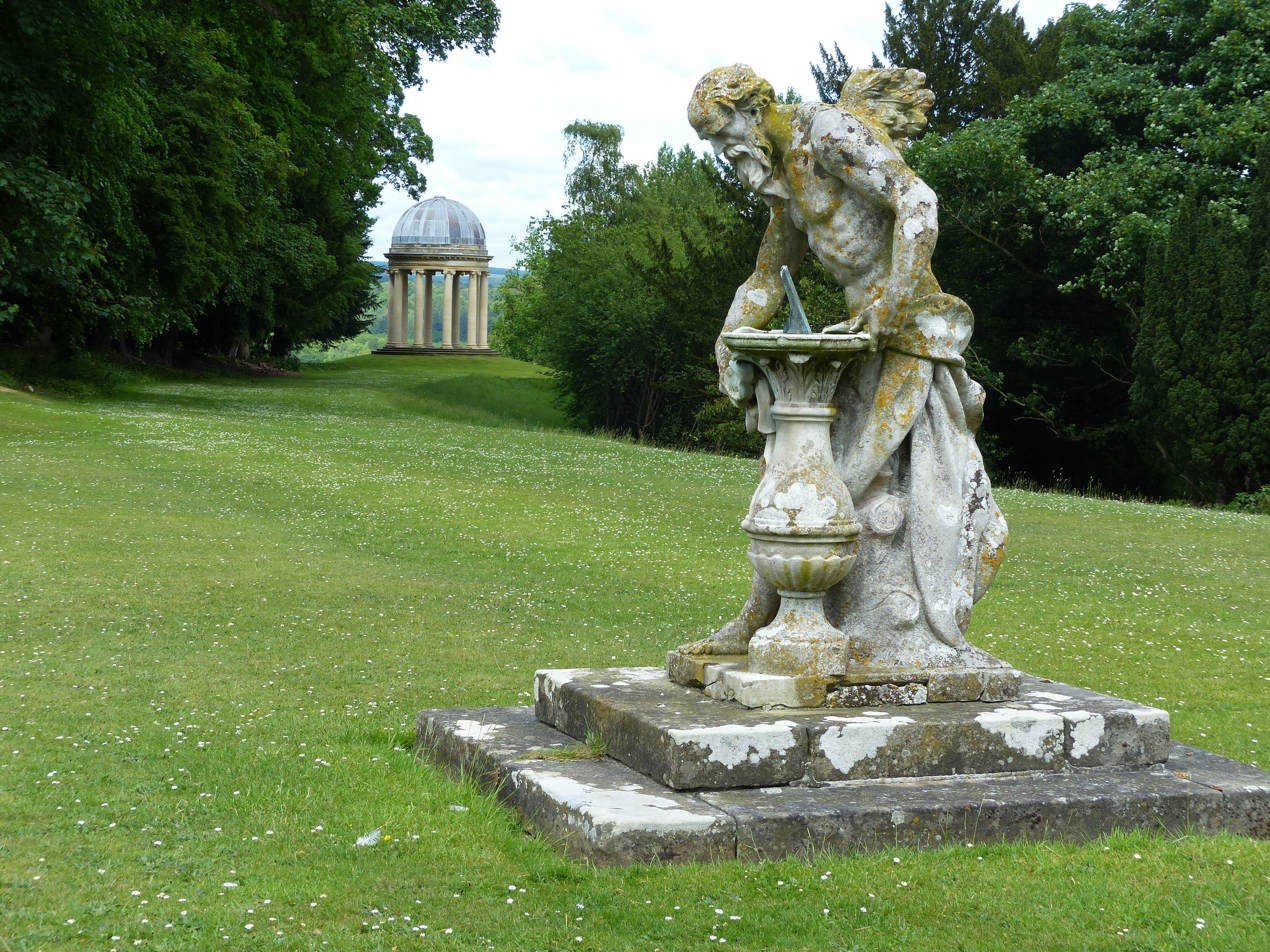
The Father Time Sundial

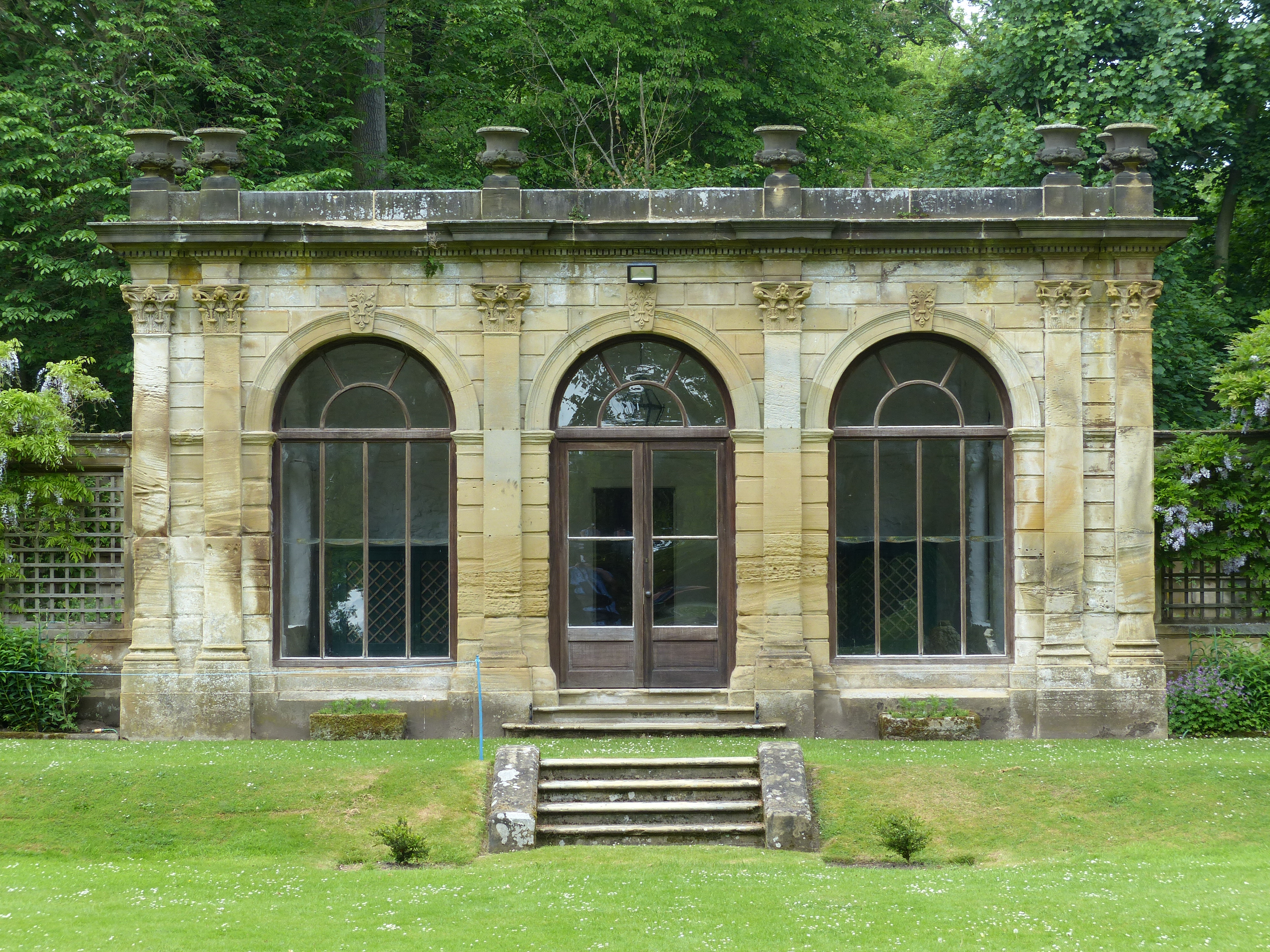
The Orangery
