= Baron Feversham =

Barony in the Peerage of Great Britain

Arms of Duncombe: Per chevron engrailed gules and argent, three talbot's heads erased counterchanged

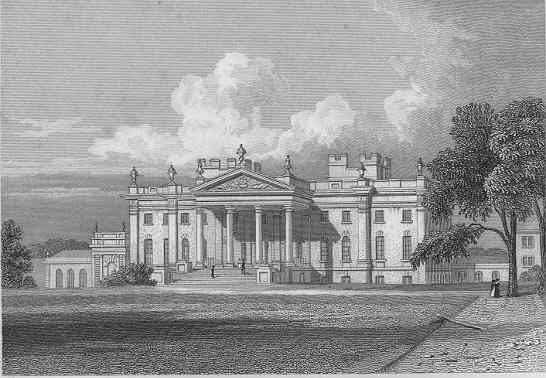
Duncombe Park circa 1829.

Baron Feversham is a title that has been created twice, once in the Peerage of Great Britain and once in the Peerage of the United Kingdom.

== Holders of the title in the 18th century ==
The first creation, in the Peerage of Great Britain, came in 1747 when Anthony Duncombe, who had earlier represented Salisbury and Downton in the House of Commons, was made Lord Feversham, Baron of Downton, in the County of Wilts. He had previously inherited half of the enormous fortune of his uncle Sir Charles Duncombe. However, Lord Feversham had no sons and the barony became extinct on his death in 1763.

== Holders of the title in the 19th century ==
The peerage was revived in the Peerage of the United Kingdom in 1826 in favour of his kinsman Charles Duncombe, who was created Baron Feversham, of Duncombe Park in the County of York. He was a former Member of Parliament for Shaftesbury, Aldborough, Heytesbury and Newport. Duncombe was the grandson of Thomas Duncombe, son of John Brown (who assumed the surname Duncombe) by his wife Ursula Duncombe, aunt of the first Baron of the 1747 creation. Ursula had inherited the other half of her brother Sir Charles Duncombe's fortune.

Lord Feversham's son, the second Baron, sat as a Conservative Member of Parliament for Yorkshire and the North Riding of Yorkshire. He was succeeded by his son, the third Baron, who represented East Retford and the North Riding of Yorkshire in the House of Commons as a Conservative and was created Viscount Helmsley, of Helmsley in the North Riding of the County of York, and Earl of Feversham, of Ryedale in the North Riding of the County of York on 25 July 1868. After his death, in 1915, he was succeeded by his grandson, the second Earl.

== Holders of the title in the 20th century ==
The second Earl sat in Parliament as a Conservative representative for Thirsk and Malton. When he was killed in the First World War the titles were inherited by his son, the third Earl who notably served as a Lord-in-waiting (government whip in the House of Lords) from 1934 to 1936 in the National Government. On his death in 1963 the viscountcy and earldom became extinct. However, he was succeeded in the barony of Feversham by his distant relative (his fourth cousin), the sixth Baron, who was the great-great-grandson of Admiral the Honourable Arthur Duncombe, fourth son of the first Baron.

As of 2018 the title is held by his eldest son, the seventh Baron, who succeeded in 2009.

The ancestral seat of the Duncombe family is Duncombe Park near Helmsley, Yorkshire. Duncombe Park was inherited by the sixth Baron's second son, Jake.

== Other notable members of the Duncombe family ==
Several other members of the Duncombe family have also gained distinction. Anthony Duncombe, father of the first Baron of the 1747 creation, was Member of Parliament for Hedon. The aforementioned Sir Charles Duncombe, uncle of the first Baron of the 1747 creation, was a wealthy banker. Thomas Slingsby Duncombe, nephew of the first Baron of the 1826 creation, was a Radical politician. The aforementioned Admiral Arthur Duncombe, fourth son of the first Baron, was an Admiral in the Royal Navy and Member of Parliament. He was the father of 1) Arthur Duncombe, a Conservative Member of Parliament, and 2) George Augustus Duncombe, who was created a baronet in 1919 (see Duncombe baronets). The Very Reverend Augustus Duncombe (1814–1880), younger son of the first Baron, was Dean of York. The Honourable Octavius Duncombe, younger son of the first Baron, represented the North Riding of Yorkshire in Parliament.

== Barons Feversham, first creation (1747) ==
- Anthony Duncombe, 1st Baron Feversham (1695–1763)

== Barons Feversham, second creation (1826) ==
- Charles Duncombe, 1st Baron Feversham (1764–1841)
  - Charles Duncombe (c. 1795 – 1819)
- William Duncombe, 2nd Baron Feversham (1798–1867)
  - Hon. Albert Duncombe (1826–1846)
- William Ernest Duncombe, 3rd Baron Feversham (1829–1915) (created Earl of Feversham in 1868)

=== Earls of Feversham (1868) ===
- William Ernest Duncombe, 1st Earl of Feversham (1829–1915)
  - William Reginald Duncombe, Viscount Helmsley (1852–1881)
- Charles William Reginald Duncombe, 2nd Earl of Feversham (1879–1916)
- Charles William Slingsby Duncombe, 3rd Earl of Feversham (1906–1963)

=== Barons Feversham, second creation (1826; reverted) ===
- (Charles Anthony) Peter Duncombe, 6th Baron Feversham (1945–2009)
- Jasper Orlando Slingsby Duncombe, 7th Baron Feversham (born 1968)

The heir apparent is the present holder's son, the Hon. Orlando Balthazar Duncombe (born 2009).

=== Male-line family tree ===
Male-line family tree, Barons Feversham

Charles Duncombe; 1st Baron Feversham; 1764–1841
Charles Duncombe c. 1795 – 1819	William Duncombe; 2nd Baron Feversham; 1798–1867	Hon. and Rev. Henry Duncombe; 1800–1832	Adm. Hon. Arthur Duncombe; 1806–1889
Viscount Helmsley; Earl of Feversham
Hon. Albert Duncombe; 1826–1846	William Duncombe; 1st Earl of Feversham; 1829–1915	Hon. Cecil Duncombe; 1832–1902	Maj. Gen. Charles Duncombe; 1838–1911	Arthur Duncombe; 1840–1911	Frederick Duncombe; 1842–1878
William Duncombe; Viscount Helmsley; 1852–1881	Hon. James Duncombe; 1853–1886	Hon. Hubert Duncombe; 1862–1918	Col. Charles Duncombe; 1862–1945	Basil Duncombe; 1870–1930	William Duncombe-Anderson; 1871–1952
Charles Duncombe; 2nd Earl of Feversham; 1879–1916	Hubert Duncombe; 1901–1931	Col. Anthony Duncombe- Anderson; 1907–1949
Charles Duncombe; 3rd Earl of Feversham; 1906–1963	Hon. David Duncombe; 1910–1927	Peter Duncombe; 6th Baron Feversham; 1945–2009
Viscountcy and earldom extinct
Jasper Duncombe; 7th Baron Feversham born 1968
Hon. Orlando Duncombe born 2009

== See also ==
- Earl of Feversham
- Duncombe baronets
