= Morritt =

Morritt may refer to:

- Andrew Morritt (born 1938), British judge, first Chancellor of the High Court
- William Morritt (c.1813–1874), British Conservative Member of Parliament 1862–1865
