= Matthew Noble =

British sculptor (1817–1876)

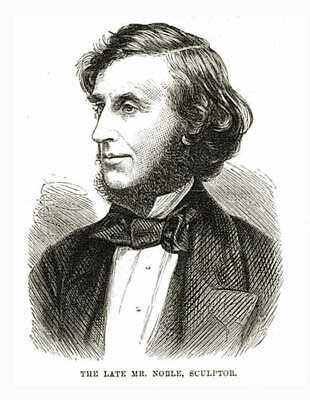
- Noble pictured in The Illustrated London News, 8 July 1876
- Born: 23 March 1817; Hackness, Yorkshire, England
- Died: 23 June 1876 (aged 59); Kensington, London, England
- Known for: Sculpture

Matthew Noble (23 March 1817 – 23 June 1876) was a leading British portrait sculptor. Carver of numerous monumental figures and busts including work, memorializing Victorian era royalty and statesmen, displayed in locations such as Westminster Abbey, St Paul's Cathedral and Parliament Square, London.

== Life ==
Noble was born in Hackness, near Scarborough, as the son of a stonemason, and served his apprenticeship under his father. He left Yorkshire for London when quite young, there he studied under John Francis (the father of sculptor Mary Thornycroft); he later married Francis's granddaughter, Frances Claxton. Exhibiting regularly at the Royal Academy from 1845 until his death, Noble became recognised after winning the competition to construct the Wellington Monument in Manchester in 1856.

Noble created a large body of work including portrait busts, statues and monuments. The deaths of two his sons, including Herbert (himself a promising sculptor, who was killed, aged 19, in the Abbots Ripton rail accident) are said to have contributed to Noble's own early death, aged 58, in June of the same year. He is buried in Brompton Cemetery, London, on the west side of the main entrance path from the north, towards the central colonnade. His uncompleted works were finished by his assistant Joseph Edwards, who also discarded the studio's plaster models.

== Selected works ==
=== 1845-1849 ===
Image	Title / subject	Location and coordinates	Date	Type	Material	Dimensions	Designation	Wikidata	Notes
More images	George Hudson	National Railway Museum, York	1847	Bust	Marble				
	William Smith	Oxford University Museum of Natural History	1848	Bust	Marble				
	John Philips	Oxford University Museum of Natural History	1849	Bust	Marble				

=== 1850-1859 ===
Image	Title / subject	Location and coordinates	Date	Type	Material	Dimensions	Designation	Wikidata	Notes
More images	Robert Peel	Market Street, Tamworth, Staffordshire	1853	Statue on pedestal	Bronze		Grade II	Q26491486	
More images	Robert Peel	Concert Hall of St George's Hall, Liverpool	1853	Statue in alcove	Marble				
	Captain Edmund Moubray Lyons	St Paul's Cathedral, London	After 1855	Curved relief panel	Marble				
	Archbishop Harcourt	York Minster	1855	Effigy on altar tomb	Marble				
	77th Regiment of Foot Crimean War memorial	St Paul's Cathedral, London	1856	Plaque	Marble				
More images	Arthur Wellesley, 1st Duke of Wellington	Piccadilly Gardens, Manchester	1856	Statue on pedestal with supporting figures	Bronze and granite		Grade II	Q26561101	
More images	Queen Victoria	The Crescent, Salford	1857	Statue on pedestal	Limestone		Grade II	Q26665923	
	Joseph Brotherton	Peel Park, Salford	1858	Statue on pedestal	Bronze and stone				
More images	James George Smith Neill	Wellington Square, Ayr, and Madras, India	1859	Statue on pedestal with plaques	Bronze and stone		Category B	Q17838465	

=== 1860-1869 ===
Image	Title / subject	Location and coordinates	Date	Type	Material	Dimensions	Designation	Wikidata	Notes
	Mountstuart Elphinstone	Crypt of St Paul's Cathedral, London	After 1859	Statue	Stone				
More images	Archbishop Musgrave	York Minster	1860	Effigy on altar tomb					
More images	Marquess of Anglesey's Column	Llanfairpwllgwyngyll, Anglesey	1860	Statue on column	Brass statue	12 foot statue on 100 ft column	Grade II*	Q17742135	Column architect, Thomas Harrison.
More images	Admiral Edmund Lyons, 1st Baron Lyons	St Paul's Cathedral, London	1862	Statue on pedestal	Marble				
More images	Sir James Outram, 1st Baronet	Westminster Abbey, London	1863	Bust on pedestal with supporting figures	Marble				
More images	Robert Bentley Todd	King's College Hospital, London	1863	Statue on pedestal	Marble				Relocated 1913
	Albert, Prince Consort	The Crescent, Salford	1864	Statue on pedestal	Limestone		Grade II		
More images	Albert, Prince Consort	Albert Square, Manchester	1862-1865	Statue on pedestal with spired canopy	Marble statue		Grade I	Q50281233	Canopy by Thomas Worthington
	Archibald Montgomerie, 13th Earl of Eglinton	Wellington Square, Ayr	1865	Statue on pedestal	Bronze and stone		Category B	Q17838485	
More images	Sir John Franklin	Waterloo Place, London	1866	Statue on pedestal with relief panels	Bronze and granite		Grade II	Q26319141	
	George Sutherland-Leveson-Gower, 2nd Duke of Sutherland	Cliveden, Buckinghamshire	1866	Statue on pedestal	Bronze and granite		Grade II		
More images	George Sutherland-Leveson-Gower, 2nd Duke of Sutherland	Near Dunrobin Castle railway station, Golspie, Scotland	1866	Statue on pedestal	Bronze and granite		Category B	Q17829346	
More images	Sir Peter Fairbairn	Woodhouse Square, Leeds	1868	Statue on pedestal	Bronze and granite		Grade II	Q26547184	
More images	Henry John Temple, 3rd Viscount Palmerston	Market Place, Romsey	1868	Statue on pedestal	Bronze and pink marble		Grade II	Q26525831	

=== 1870 and later ===
Image	Title / subject	Location and coordinates	Date	Type	Material	Dimensions	Designation	Wikidata	Notes
More images	Sir James Outram, 1st Baronet	Victoria Embankment Gardens, London	1871	Statue on pedestal	Bronze and granite		Grade II	Q20054478	
	Sir James Ramsden	Duke Street, Barrow-in-Furness	1872	Statue on pedestal	Bronze and granite		Grade II		
	Harriet Howard, 2nd Duchess of Sutherland	Dunrobin Castle, Golspie, Scotland	1872	Bust in canopy with spire	Bronze and granite		Category B		
	Queen Victoria	St Thomas' Hospital, London	1873	Seated statue on pedestal	Marble and stone			Q93424107	
	Edward Smith-Stanley, 14th Earl of Derby	Miller Park, Preston	1873	Statue on pedestal	Marble and granite	7.3m tall	Grade II		
More images	Edward Smith-Stanley, 14th Earl of Derby	Parliament Square, London	1874	Statue on pedestal with relief panels	Bronze and granite		Grade II	Q18116483	
More images	George Hamilton Gordon, 4th Earl of Aberdeen	Westminster Abbey, London	1874	Bust	Marble				
More images	Sir John Franklin	Westminster Abbey, London	1875	Bust and surround	Marble and alabaster				
More images	Oliver Cromwell	Wythenshawe Hall, Manchester	1875	Statue on roughly-hewn pedestal and base	Bronze and granite		Grade II	Q26546639	
	Samuel Lister, 1st Baron Masham	Lister Park, Bradford	1875	Statue on pedestal with reliefs	Marble, granite and bronze		Grade II		
More images	Robert Peel	Parliament Square, London	1876	Statue on pedestal	Bronze and red granite		Grade II	Q19277831	
	Bishop Thomas Carr	St. Thomas Cathedral, Mumbai							

=== Church monuments and memorials ===
Throughout his career Noble was responsible for creating a number of monuments and memorials for British churches and cathedrals. Examples include

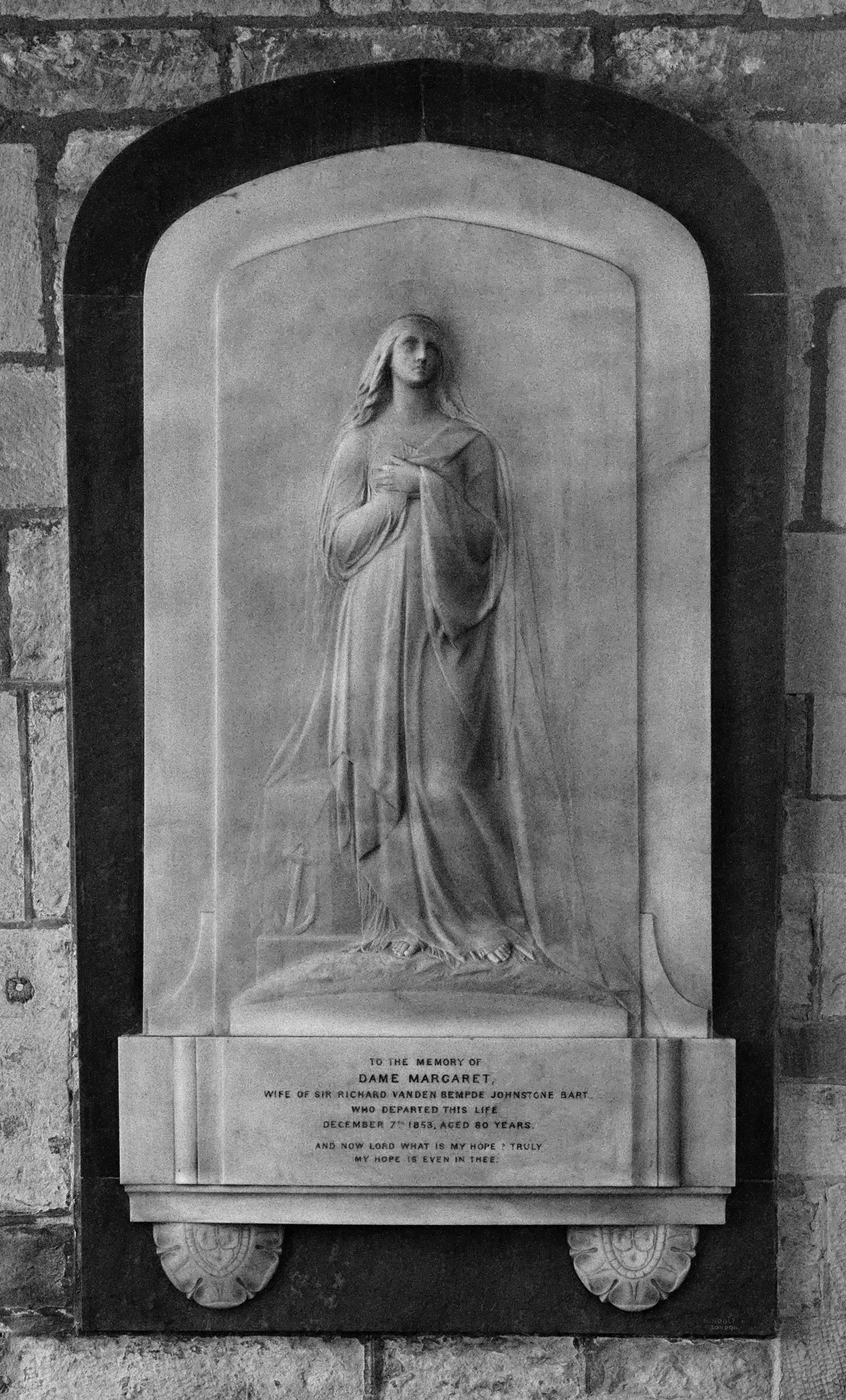
Memorial to Lady Vanden Bempde-Johnstone in the Chancel of the Church of St Peter, Hackness

- Carved stone reredos depicting The Last Supper in the Church of All Saints at Eskdaleside cum Ugglebarnby in North Yorkshire.
- Wall monument to Lady Vanden Bempde-Johnstone in the Church of St. Peter, Hackness, North Yorkshire.
- Wall tablet memorial to Ann Harland, died 1844, in the Church of All Saints at Brompton, Scarborough.
- Pink granite tomb monument with bust, now lost, to Thomas Hood, died 1845, in Kensal Green Cemetery, London.
- A monument to Lord Francis Egerton, 1st Earl of Ellesmere, died 1857, designed by George Gilbert Scott with an effigy by Noble in the Church of St. Mark, Salford.
- An 1859 memorial to F. J. Robinson, 1st Viscount Goderich, designed by George Gilbert Scott and carved by Noble, in the Church of All Saints, Nocton, Lincolnshire.
- Tomb chest with effigy, in grey and white marble, as a memorial to Thomas de Grey, 2nd Earl de Grey, died 1859, in the Church of Saint John the Baptist at Flitton.
- A chest monument with marble effigy to John Elphinstone, 13th Lord Elphinstone, died 1860, in the Church of St Peter, Limpsfield, Surrey.
- Monument, with effigy, to Sir Thomas Fermor-Hesketh, 5th Baronet, died 1872, in the Church of St. Mary the Virgin at Rufford, Lancashire.
- A monument, with life-size figures, dating from 1872 to William and Mary Heath in the Church of St. Lawrence at Biddulph, Staffordshire.
- Recumbent effigy of Sir Stephen Glynne (d. 1874) in St Deiniol's Church, Hawarden
- Memorial to Rev Henry Venn, 1875, St Paul's Cathedral, London
- Marble bust of Lord Hobart, c. 1875, St. Mary's Church, Chennai
- Chest monument with effigy to Lord Lyveden, died 1876, in the Church of St Andrew, Brigstock, Northamptonshire.
- Several memorials, dating from 1868 to 1888, in the Church of St Mary and All Saints at Swynnerton, Staffordshire.

=== Other works ===
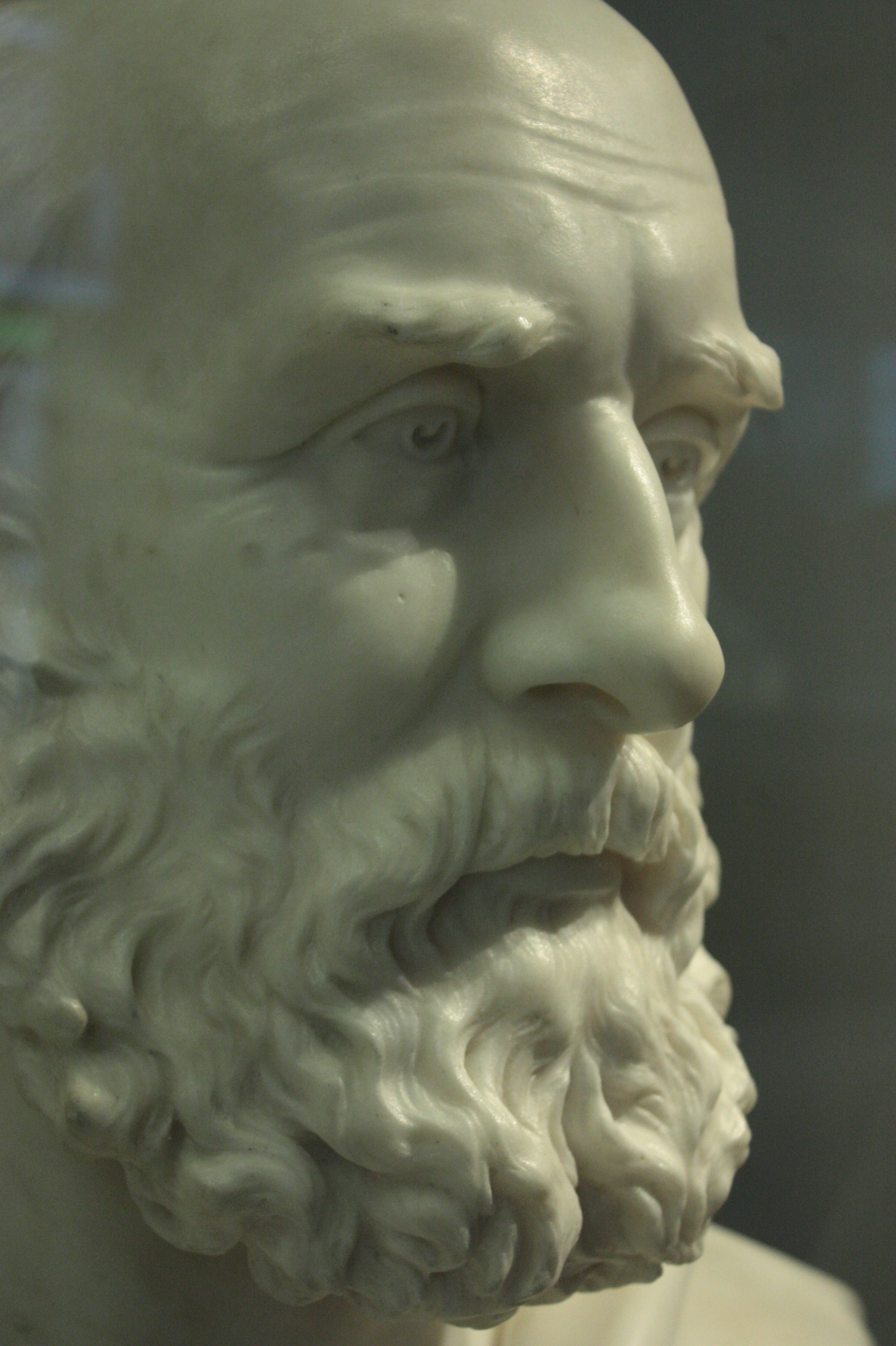
David Napier, 1871

- Bust of David Napier, 1871, Glasgow Transport Museum
- Statue of William Cotton, 1855, Bank of England
- Busts of Oliver Cromwell, Queen Victoria and Albert, Prince Consort in Manchester Town Hall
- Bust of former mayor Thomas Goadsby, 1862, in Manchester Town Hall
- Statues, on high cylindrical pedestals, of Queen Victoria, 1858, and Albert, Prince Consort, 1865, in the foyer of Leeds Town Hall
- Marble busts of Edward, Prince of Wales and of Queen Alexandra in Leeds Town Hall
- James McGrigor in the small garden to the Royal Army Medical College, London
- Statues of David Hume, John Hunter and Humphry Davy at the rear of the Royal Academy building, London
- Captain William (Bill) Henry Cecil George Pechell (1830–1855) now in Waterloo Street Community Garden, Hove, East Sussex
- Bust of Frederick Dawes Danvers completed in 1863
- Marble statue of Charles Canning, 1st Earl Canning and a bust of Charlotte Canning, Countess Canning, both 1852, both for the interior of the Victoria Memorial, Kolkata
- Statue of Richard Bourke, 6th Earl of Mayo, c. 1875, at Mayo College, Ajmer, India
- Statue of Albert, Prince Consort, Bombay, India, 1869. Located at the Dr. Bhau Daji Lad Museum, Mumbai
- Marble statue of Queen Victoria and marble canopy, Bombay, India, 1872. Currently located in the grounds of the Dr. Bhau Daji Lad Museum, Mumbai.
- Statue of William Duncombe, 2nd Baron Feversham in the Feversham Monument, with canopy designed by George Gilbert Scott, erected in his memory at Helmsley, North Yorkshire, c. 1867.
- Marble busts of Oliver Cromwell from 1860 and of Giuseppe Garibaldi from 1867 in the Victoria and Albert Museum
