= George Duncombe =

George Duncombe may refer to:

- Sir George Augustus Duncombe, 1st Baronet (1848–1933), of the Duncombe baronets
- George Duncombe (MP), MP for Surrey (UK Parliament constituency)
