= Feversham Monument =

Listed building in North Yorkshire, England

Coordinates: 54°14′46″N 1°03′40″W

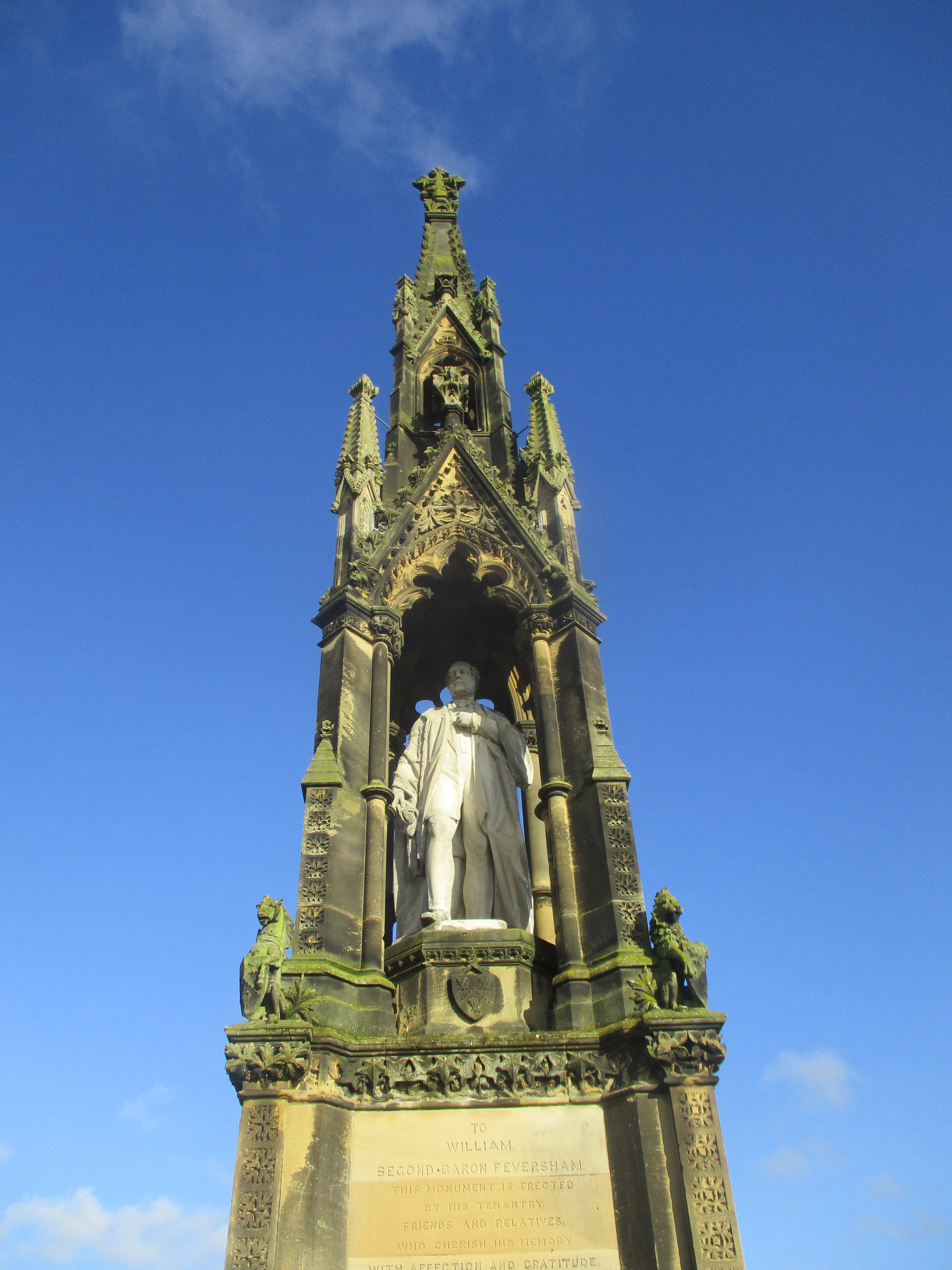
- Interactive map of Feversham Monument
- Location: Helmsley, North Yorkshire, England

The Feversham Monument is a memorial in the marketplace of Helmsley, a town in North Yorkshire, in England.

The monument is to William Duncombe, 2nd Baron Feversham, who died in 1867. It was commissioned by his son, William Duncombe, 1st Earl of Feversham, who laid the foundation stone in May 1869. The canopy, designed by George Gilbert Scott, was completed in 1870, but the statue, carved by Matthew Noble, was only lifted into place in December 1871. The work cost about £1,000, and on completion it was described by the British Farmers' Magazine as "well-conceived and wrought out", and bearing "a general resemblance on a small scale to the Scott Monument at Edinburgh". It was grade II* listed in 1985. In 2021, it was assessed as needing specialist repair work, following damage from rain, plant growth and birds' nests.

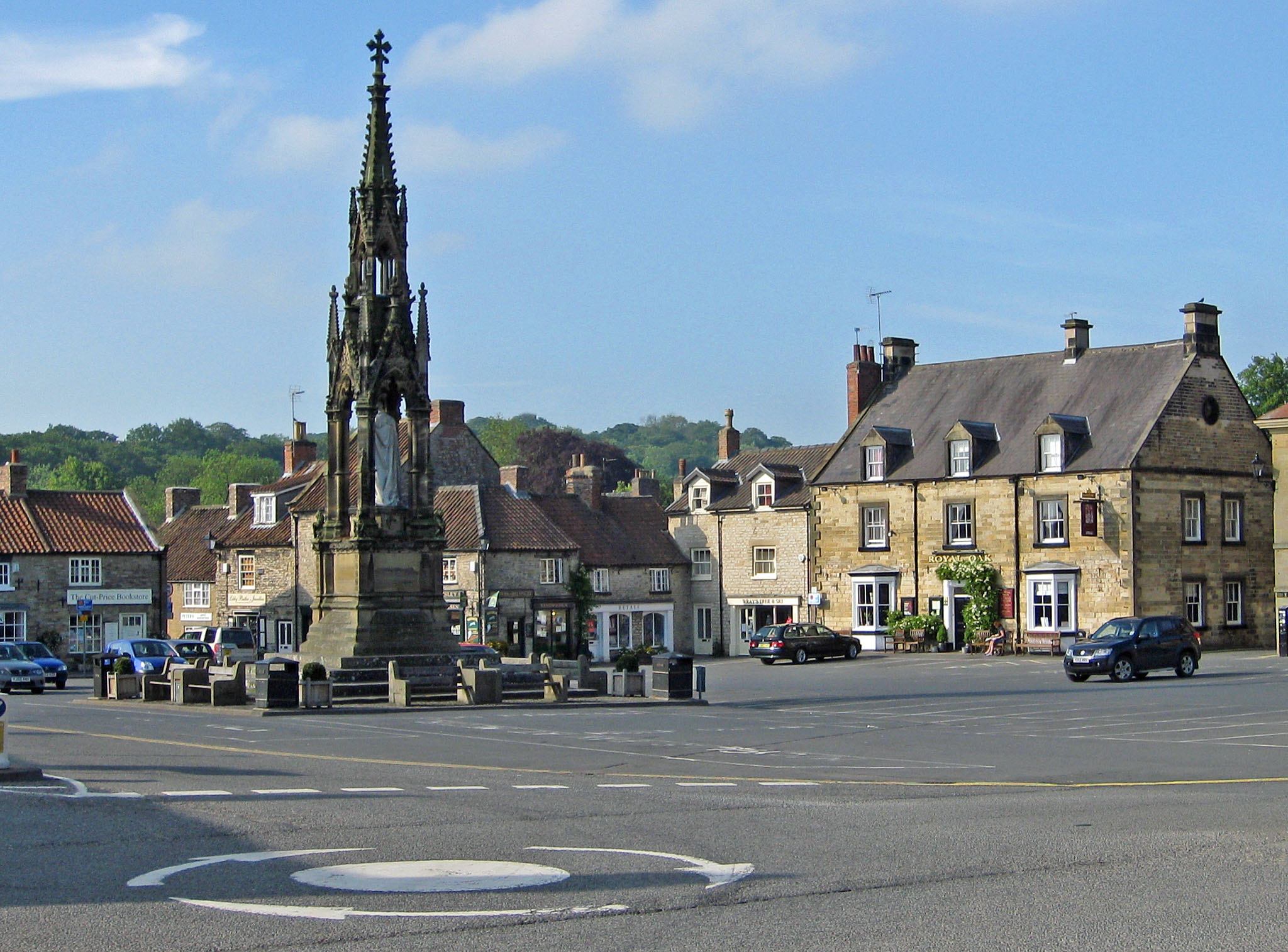
The monument, in the marketplace, seen in 2011

The monument is in the Gothic Revival style and is about 50 feet (15 m) tall. The statue is in limestone and consists of the baron standing in full regalia on a pedestal with a foliate frieze, atop four steps. The canopy is in sandstone and is carried on four buttressed columns with shafts and heraldic beasts with shields. It has four gables with corner crocketed finials, and the pinnacle has a two-light opening, crockets, finials and a cross. It is inscribed: "To William Second Baron of Feversham. This monument is erected by his tenantry, friends and relatives who cherish his memory with affection and gratitude. Born 1798, died 1867".

== See also ==
- Grade II* listed buildings in North Yorkshire (district)
- Listed buildings in Helmsley
