= Frederick Milbank =

British politician (1820–1898)

The Right Honourable Sir Frederick Milbank, Bt
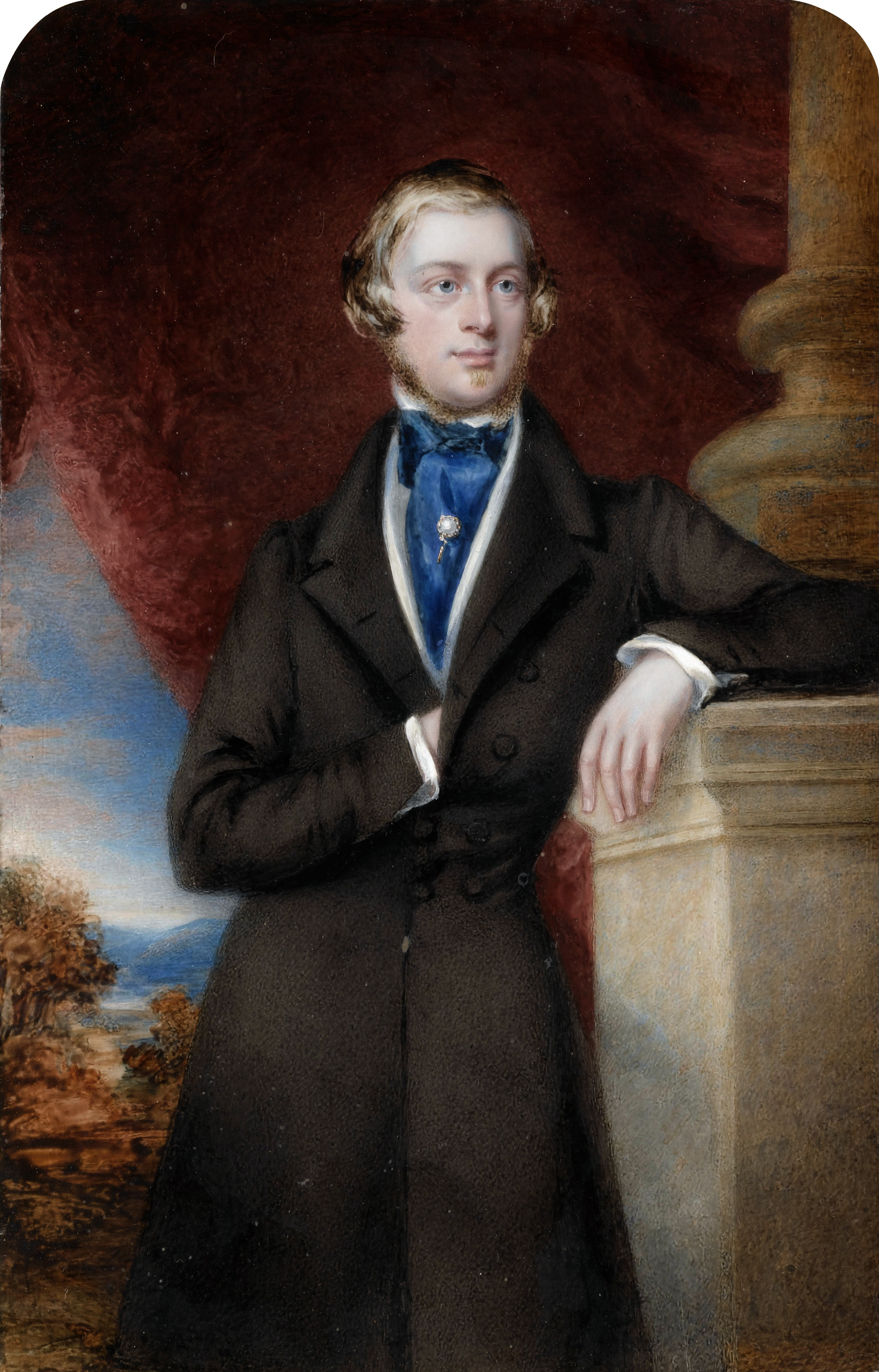
- Portrait of Milbank by Maria Mosely, 1846

Member of Parliament for Richmond
- In office 1885–1886
- Preceded by: New creation
- Succeeded by: Sir George Elliot

Member of Parliament for North Riding of Yorkshire
- In office 1865–1885 Serving with William Duncombe, Octavius Duncombe, Viscount Helmsley, Guy Dawnay
- Preceded by: William Duncombe; William John Sawrey Morritt
- Succeeded by: Constituency abolished

Personal details
- Born: Frederick Acclom Milbank; 21 April 1820
- Died: 28 April 1898 (aged 78) Barningham, County Durham
- Party: Liberal
- Spouse: Alexina Harriet Don (m. 1844, died)
- Relations: William Vane, 1st Duke of Cleveland (grandfather)
- Children: 4, including Powlett
- Parent(s): Mark Milbank; Lady Augusta Vane

Sir Frederick Acclom Milbank, 1st Baronet (21 April 1820 – 28 April 1898), was a British Liberal Member of Parliament.

== Early life ==
Milbank was born on 21 April 1820 in London. He was the son of Lady Augusta Vane and Mark Milbank, MP for Camelford and High Sheriff of Yorkshire. Among his siblings were Mark William Vane Milbank (who married a daughter of Sir Thomas Farquhar, 2nd Baronet), and Henry John Milbank (who married a daughter of the 8th Baron Grey of Groby, and Lady Susan Osborne, a daughter of the 8th Duke of Leeds).

His paternal grandparents were Dorothy (née Wise) Milbank and William Milbank, who bought Thorp Perrow Hall, Snape Castle, and Snape village in 1798. His maternal grandparents were William Vane, 1st Duke of Cleveland and Lady Catherine Powlett (a daughter of the 6th Duke of Bolton).

== Career ==
In 1842, Milbank inherited estates at Hart and Hartlepool in county Durham from his maternal grandfather, the 1st Duke of Cleveland. He served as a Lieutenant in the 79th Highlanders.

As a Liberal, Milbank was elected to the House of Commons for the North Riding of Yorkshire in 1865, a seat he held until 1885, and then represented Richmond until 1886. On 16 May 1882 he was created a Baronet, of Well in the County of York, and of Hart in the County of Durham.

== Personal life ==
In 1844 Milbank married Alexina "Aline" Harriet Don (c. 1826–1919), daughter of Sir Alexander Don, 6th Baronet and the author Grace Jane Stein (a daughter of Edinburgh banker and distiller John Stein). They were parents of:

- Alice Frederica Milbank (1845–1902), who married David Dale in 1888.
- Wilhelmina Louisa Milbank (1846–1903), who died unmarried.
- William Harry Vane Milbank (1848–1892), who married Désiré Baruch (née Vandenberg), widow of Edward Charles, Marquis de Belleroche, becoming the stepfather of painter Count Albert de Belleroche.
- Powlett Charles John Milbank (1852–1918), who married Edith Mary Green-Price, a daughter of Sir Richard Green-Price, 1st Baronet in 1875.

Sir Frederick died in April 1898, aged 78, at Barningham Park, Barnard Castle, in Barningham, County Durham. He was succeeded by his second son Powlett as his eldest son predeceased him without male issue.

=== Extramarital relationship ===
Reportedly, Sir Frederick had a child, named Madeleine Augusta Crabb, out of wedlock with the stage actress (and artist's model to Dante Gabriel Rossetti) known as Ruth Herbert (née Louisa Ruther Herbert Maynard). Madeleine married Brig.-Gen. Sir Conyers Surtees, MP for Gateshead, in 1887.

Parliament of the United Kingdom
Preceded by William Duncombe and William John Sawrey Morritt	Member of Parliament for North Riding of Yorkshire; 1865–1885; With: William Duncombe 1865–1867; Octavius Duncombe 1867–1874; Viscount Helmsley 1874–1882; Guy Dawnay 1882–1885	Constituency abolished
Preceded by John Charles Dundas	Member of Parliament for Richmond; 1885–1886	Succeeded by Sir George William Elliot
Baronetage of the United Kingdom
New creation	Baronet (of Well and Hart); 1882–1898	Succeeded by Powlett Charles John Milbank
