= Albert de Belleroche =

Welsh painter and lithographer

Count Albert de Belleroche
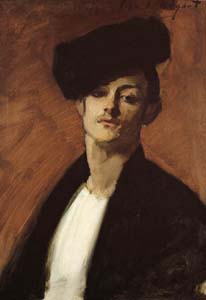
- John Singer Sargent, Albert de Belleroche, c. 1882
- Born: Albert Gustavus de Belleroche; 22 October 1864; Swansea, Wales
- Died: 14 July 1944 (aged 79); Southwell, Nottinghamshire, England
- Resting place: Southwell Minster churchyard 53.0772°N 0.95592°W
- Education: Carolus-Duran's art school in Paris
- Known for: Painting, lithography
- Spouse: Julie Emilie Visseaux (m. 1910)
- Children: 3
- Awards: Chevalier de l'Ordre de Leopold

Count Albert Gustavus de Belleroche (22 October 1864 – 14 July 1944), also known as Albert Belleroche, was a Welsh painter and lithographer, who lived most of his childhood and his adulthood in Paris and England. He began as a painter, but at the turn of the century focused on lithography, for which he is most well-known. He was awarded the Chevalier de l'Ordre de Leopold by King Albert I of Belgium in 1933.

== Early life ==
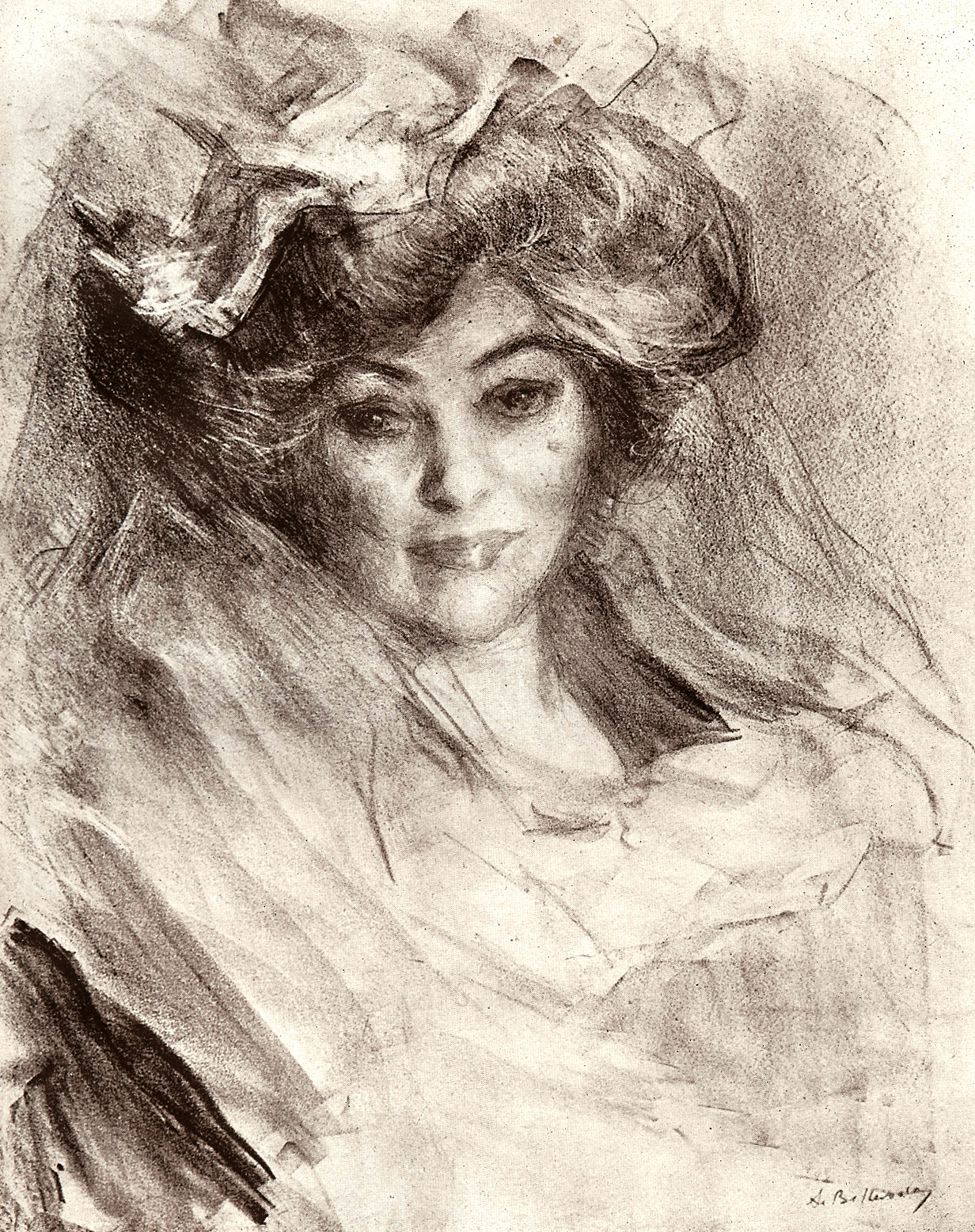
Lithograph of the artist's mother, Mrs. Harry Vane Milbank, c. 1900

Albert Gustavus de Belleroche was born on 22 October 1864 in Swansea, Wales. His father was Edward Charles, the Marquis de Belleroche, who died when Albert was three years old. His mother Alice was the daughter of Désiré Baruch Vandenberg, or van den Bergh, of Brussels. In March 1871, she married Harry Vane Millbank, the son of MP Frederick Milbank. He grew up in Paris and London and he used the surname Milbank until he was 30 years of age. He attained the title of count from his father's family of French Huguenot ancestry.

== Career and personal life ==
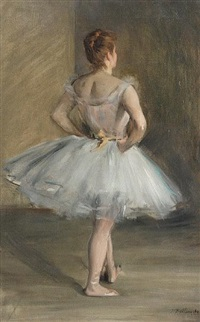
La Danseuse (model Lili Grenier), c. 1890

In 1882, Belleroche studied briefly at Carolus-Duran's art school in Paris, preferring to study the masters like Johannes Vermeer and Sandro Botticelli at museums.

Belleroche was a friend and studio-mate of John Singer Sargent in Paris and London, with the men making many sketches and paintings of each other. Some of the works that Sargent made of Belleroche are suggestive of an emotional relationship between the men and Belleroche may have been the love of Sargent's life. Dorothy Moss, an art historian, states "Sargent's portraits of Belleroche, in their sensuality and intensity of emotion, push the boundaries of what was considered appropriate interaction between men at this period."

Belleroche was financially independent and did not need or desire to obtain work through commissions. Instead, he chose whom he would paint, which included Japanese wrestler Taro Miyake; painter Victorine Meurent, who modelled also for Édouard Manet and became famous as his Olympia; dancer and spy Mata Hari; and acrobat Cha-U-Kao. He then sought to be more independent of Sargent's artistic influence, and was possibly affected by the Labouchere Amendment of 1885 that criminalised sexual relationships between men and was used in 1895 against Oscar Wilde, who was a friend of Belleroche and Sargent.

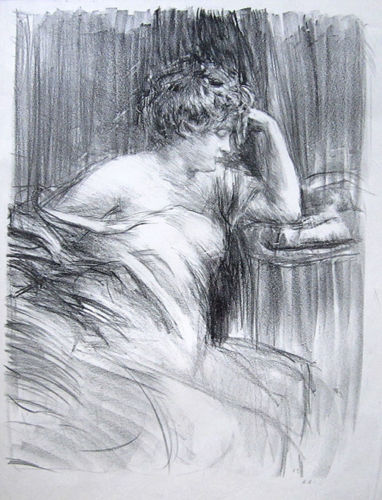
Meditation, 1904

Belleroche took a studio in Montmartre in Paris, and in 1900 transitioned from painting in oil to creating lithographs, predominantly of women. He created his works using wax crayon on stone. He entered into a ten-year relationship with Lili Grenier, who modeled for Henri de Toulouse-Lautrec. At the Salon d'Automne in 1904, a room was dedicated to his paintings and lithographs.

In 1910, Belleroche married Julie Emilie Visseaux, whose father was sculptor Jules Edouard Visseaux. Due to Grenier's jealous behavior, Belleroche and his wife moved to England, first living with his mother in St John's Wood, Westminster. In 1912, they moved to West Hampstead and six years later, they moved to Rustington, Sussex. The couple had a daughter Alice and two sons, Harry and William.

Belleroche became a master lithographer. Artist Frank Brangwyn said that "no one else has succeeded in making lithography the rival of painting." He developed a method of detecting forged watermarks in 1915. Belleroche's work tapered off after World War I.

== Later years and death ==
A retrospective exhibition was held in 1933 at the Bibliothèque Royale in Brussels of 291 lithographs. Belleroche received the Chevalier de l'Ordre de Leopold from King Albert I of Belgium at that time.

Belleroche moved to Southwell, Nottinghamshire when the English coast began to be bombed during World War II. (Note: The house he lived in in West Hampstead was destroyed during bombing raids.) His wife and daughter Alice were with him at the Crown Hotel and he kept a small studio in town. He suffered from a long illness before he died in Southwell on 14 July 1944. (Note: The Dictionary of Welsh Biography states that he died in Rustington, Sussex.) He was buried in Southwell Minster churchyard; the funeral was officiated by his friend, J. P. Hales, Archdeacon of Newark. His son, William assumed the French title of count. His wife died in 1958 and was also buried at Southwell.

== Legacy ==
Albert de Belleroche (1864-1944): Women of the Belle Epoque was published in 1996 of his lithographs made in the first two decades of the 20th century. In 2001, Steven Kern published The Rival of Painting: the lithographs of Albert Belleroche.

Belleroche's works are in the collections of the National Museum of Wales, Bibliothèque Royale, Musée du Luxembourg, Bibliothèque Nationale in Paris, and the British Museum in London. There are two rooms at Musee d'Orange dedicated to Belleroche and Frank Brangwyn. The San Diego Museum of Art has a large collection of Belleroche prints, some of which were included in the exhibition that they held entitled "A Century of Lithography".

In 2024 the Russell-Cotes Art Gallery & Museum held a Belleroche exhibition titled A Painter in Paris.

== Gallery ==
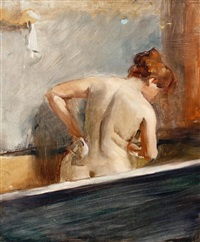
Lili au bain, circa 1890

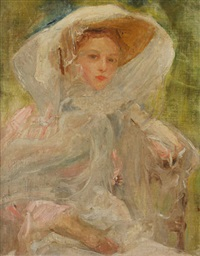
Portrait de jeune femme à chapeau, circa 1900

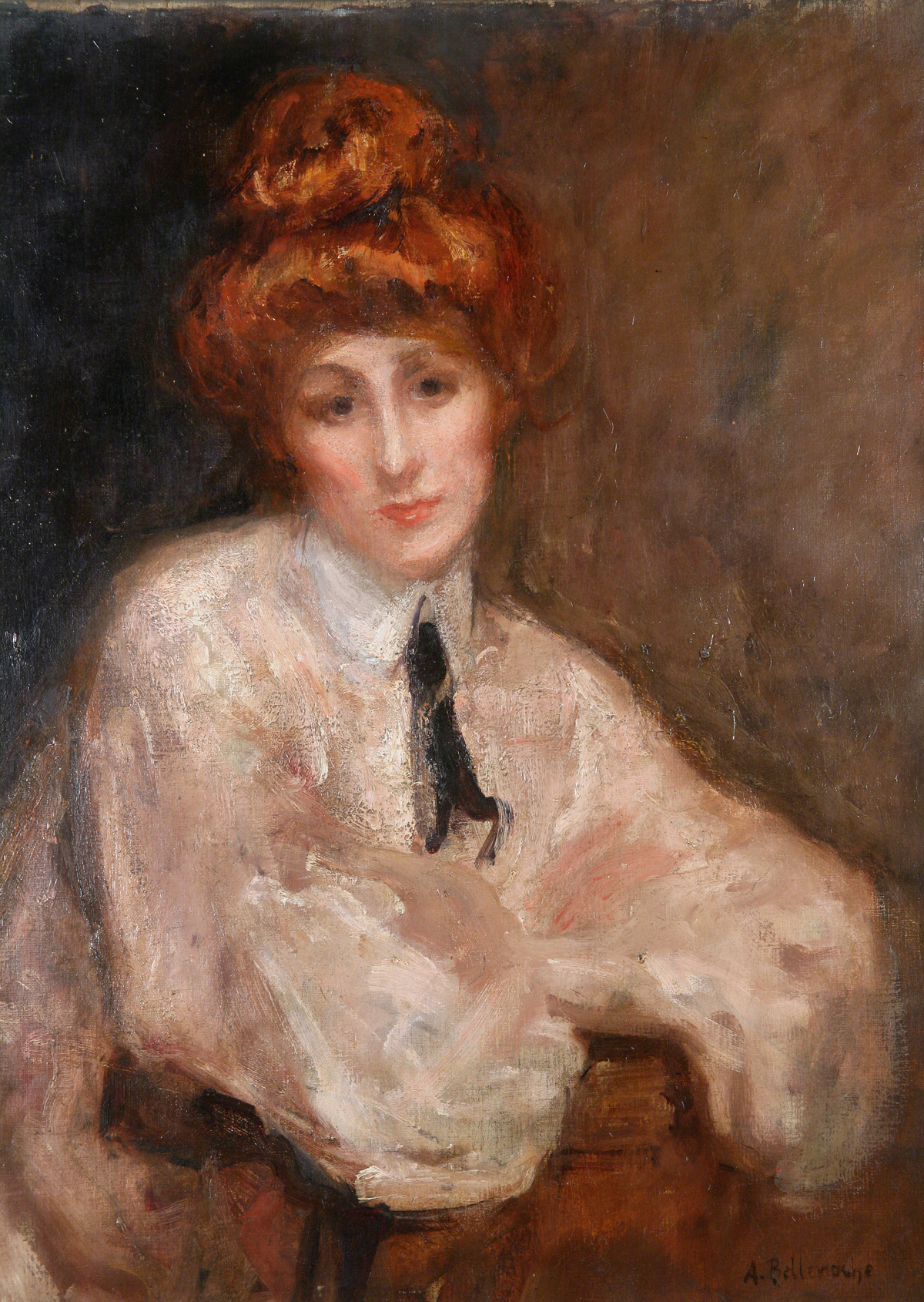
Berthe, circa 1900
