= Edward Cayley =

British politician (1802–1862)

Edward Stillingfleet Cayley (13 August 1802 – 25 February 1862) was a British Liberal Party politician.

He was elected at the 1832 general election as a member of parliament for North Riding of Yorkshire, and held the seat until his death in 1862, at the age of 59. He advocated free trade in Parliament and went to Rugby School and Brasenose College, Oxford, thus breaking the Cayley tradition of going to Cambridge.

== Career ==
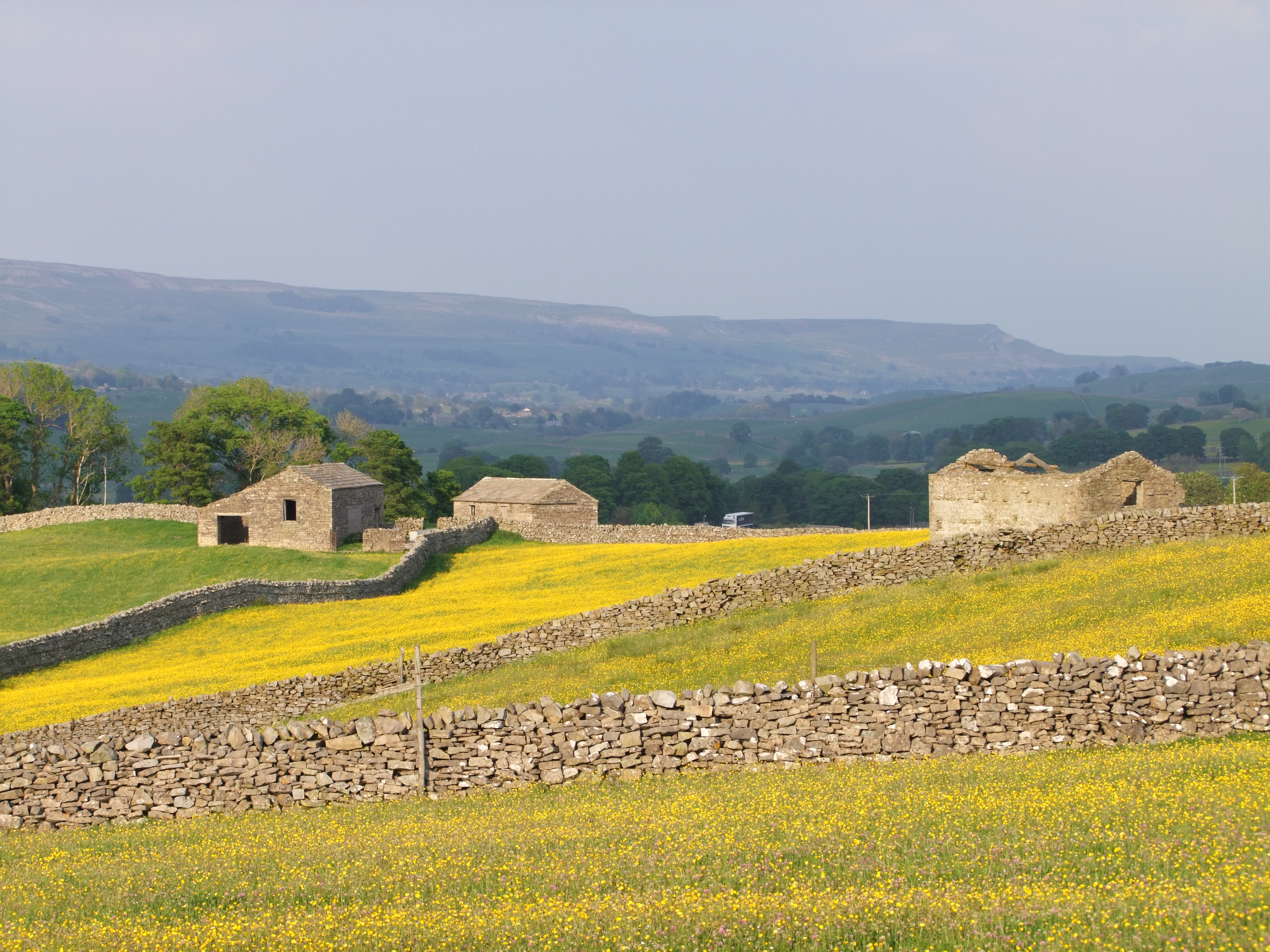
Yorkshire farm

After graduating from Oxford, Cayley took up residence in North Yorkshire where he engaged in farming. He also undertook studies in history, economics, and philosophy to supplement his formal education in 'dead languages'". Cayley became a "barrister-at-law" and joined the Inner Temple. As a magistrate and barrister, his doors were always open for counsel. He promoted the Yorkshire and other agricultural societies as a speaker and writer. Thus, Cayley became well-known and highly respected by the farmers of his district, so much so that they called on him to represent them in Parliament. At the 1832 general election he stood for election in the two-member county constituency of North Riding of Yorkshire as an independent of Liberal sympathies and a friend of the interests of small agriculturalists, 'unassisted by the aristocracy on either side' and was elected a Member of Parliament, behind William Duncombe a Tory with major landholdings in the Riding, but ahead of John Charles Ramsden a former Whig MP for Yorkshire who had the support of the Whigs but was a West Riding industrialist. Cayley held the seat until his death in 1862, at the age of 59.

As an independent member of Parliament, Cayley fought against "inequalities of taxation". He served on the Agricultural distress and Hand-loom weavers committees

Cayley died of heart disease while making the arduous trip to London. The Farmer's Magazine gave Caley a glowing obituary, describing him as a "farmers' friend" who "stood with the farmers, by the farmers, and for the farmers."

== Family ==
Cayley was born at Newbold Hall near Market Weighton. He died at Dean's Yard, Westminster.

His parents, John Cayley and Elizabeth Sarah Stillingfleet, were both deaf and dumb. His mother was descended from Edward Stillingfleet, Bishop of Worcester. He was a fine cricketer. On 30 August 1823, he married his cousin, Emma Cayley, daughter of Sir George Cayley, the aeronautical baronet. They had three sons:

- Edward Stillingfleet Cayley (1824–1884), an author, barrister and landowner educated at Eton and Trinity College, Cambridge. He wrote on the European revolutions of 1848 and the Franco-German War of 1870. In 1872, he married Ellen Louisa Awdry (1845–1903), daughter of Ambrose Awdry of Seend, Wiltshire.
- George John Cayley (1826–1878), a barrister educated at Eton and Trinity College, Cambridge, (though he never took his degree). He had left-wing tendencies and, in 1868, stood as the Working Man's candidate for Scarborough in the general election. He published several pieces of light verse, a book on electoral reform and the working classes, and a popular book about his travels in Spain. The frontispiece of this book shows him with a magnificent mid-Victorian beard. He had a reputation as an accomplished metalworker; in 1862, he and the painter George Frederick Watts designed the challenge shield for a national shooting championship at Wimbledon. He was also an accomplished tennis-player; he helped to develop several types of tennis racket, and wrote an article on the game for the Edinburgh Review in 1875. He had homes at Wydale Hall, Snainton, North Yorkshire, and in Westminster. In 1860, he married Mary Anne Frances Wilmot (c.1843–1908); they had three children:
  - Hugh Cayley (1861–1924), educated at Trinity College, Cambridge, who lived at Wydale and married Rosa Louisa Violet (died 1915), daughter of Johann Seelig of Hanover.
  - Arthur Cayley (1862–1868)
  - Violet Cayley (born in 1865), who took part in amateur theatricals at public theatres in Norfolk.
- Charles Digby Cayley (1827–1844), educated at Eton, who became a midshipman in the Royal Navy, was awarded a medal for his part in activities in the Levant, and drowned with a companion when a squall hit the sailing boat in which they were sailing off Largs, Scotland.

Parliament of the United Kingdom
New constituency	Member of Parliament for North Riding of Yorkshire; 1832 – 1862; With: William Duncombe to 1841; Octavius Duncombe 1841–59; William Duncombe (2) from 1859	Succeeded by William Morritt; William Duncombe (2)
