= Duncombe baronets =

Extinct baronetcy in the Baronetage of the United Kingdom

Arms of Duncombe: Per chevron engrailed gules and argent, three talbot's heads erased counterchanged

There have been two baronetcies created for persons with the surname Duncombe, one in the Baronetage of England and one in the Baronetage of the United Kingdom. Both creations are extinct.

The Duncombe baronetcy, of Tangley Park in the County of Surrey, was created in the Baronetage of England on 4 February 1662 for Francis Duncombe. The title became extinct on the death of the second Baronet in 1706. Sir Philip Pauncefort-Duncombe, 1st Baronet, of Great Brickhill, was a descendant of Thomas Duncombe (16th century), whose brother Roger Duncombe was the ancestor of the Duncombe baronets of Tangley Park (see Pauncefort-Duncombe baronets).

The Duncombe baronetcy, of Highfield in the Parish of Driffield in the County of York, was created in the Baronetage of the United Kingdom on 16 May 1919 for George Duncombe, a deputy lieutenant and justice of the peace for the East Riding of Yorkshire. He was the son of Admiral Arthur Duncombe, younger son of Charles Duncombe, 1st Baron Feversham (see Baron Feversham for earlier history of the family). Arthur Duncombe was his brother. Duncombe had no surviving male issue and the title became extinct on his death in 1933.

== Duncombe baronets, of Tangley Park (1662) ==
- Sir Francis Duncombe, 1st Baronet (died 1670)
- Sir William Duncombe, 2nd Baronet (1658–1706)

== Duncombe baronets, of Highfield (1919) ==
- Sir George Augustus Duncombe, 1st Baronet (1848–1933), married on 1890 Hester, daughter of Col. John Allardice. And had issue:
  - Archibald Charles Duncombe (1894–1909)

== See also ==
- Pauncefort-Duncombe baronets
- Baron Feversham
