= Pauncefort-Duncombe baronets =

Baronetcy in the Baronetage of the United Kingdom

The Pauncefort-Duncombe Baronetcy, of Great Brickhill in the County of Buckingham, is a title in the baronetage of the United Kingdom. It was created on 25 May 1859 for Philip Pauncefort-Duncombe. He was the son of Philip Pauncefort-Duncombe, who had assumed by Royal licence the additional surname of Duncombe in 1804. The family seat is Brickhill Manor, Great Brickhill. The fourth baronet served as a deputy lieutenant of Buckinghamshire.

== Pauncefort-Duncombe baronets, of Great Brickhill (1859) ==
- Sir Philip Duncombe Pauncefort-Duncombe, 1st Baronet (1818–1890)
- Sir Philip Henry Pauncefort-Duncombe, 2nd Baronet (1849–1895)
- Sir Everard Philip Digby Pauncefort-Duncombe, 3rd Baronet (1885–1971)
- Sir Philip Digby Pauncefort-Duncombe, 4th Baronet (1927–2011)
- Sir David Philip Henry Pauncefort-Duncombe, 5th Baronet (born 1956)

The heir apparent is the present holder's son Henry Digby Pauncefort-Duncombe (born 1988).

== See also ==
- Duncombe baronets
