= William Duncombe, 2nd Baron Feversham =

British peer

The Right Honourable The Lord Feversham
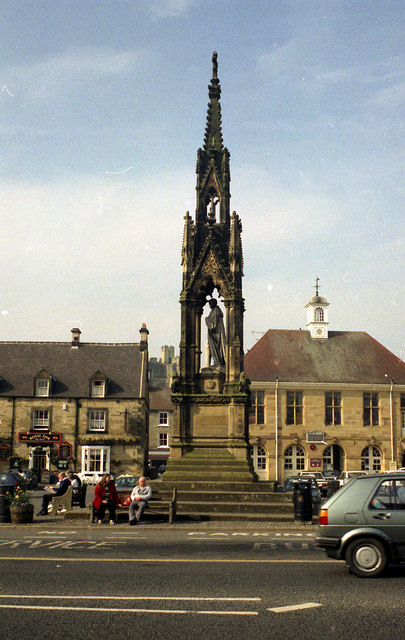
- Monument to Lord Feversham, Helmsley, North Yorkshire

Member of Parliament for North Riding of Yorkshire
- In office 1832–1841 Serving with Edward Stillingfleet Cayley

Member of Parliament for Yorkshire
- In office 1826–1831

Member of Parliament for Great Grimsby
- In office 1820–1826 Serving with Charles Tennyson

Personal details
- Born: William Duncombe; 14 January 1798
- Died: 11 February 1867 (aged 69)

Arms of Duncombe: Per chevron engrailed gules and argent, three talbot's heads erased counterchanged

William Duncombe, 2nd Baron Feversham (14 January 1798 – 11 February 1867), was a British peer with a large estate in the North Riding of Yorkshire. He was prominent in the affairs of the Royal Agricultural Society and owner of a prize-winning herd of short-horn cattle. He served as a Tory Member of Parliament (MP) for the Riding from 1832 to 1841, after which he sat in the House of Lords, having succeeded to the title on the death of his father. From 1826 to 1831 he had sat as an Ultra-Tory MP. He was the first MP to support Richard Oastler's campaign for Factory Reform, and gave it unwavering support for the rest of his life; in 1847 he seconded the Second Reading in the Lords of the Factories Act 1847 (the 'Ten-Hour Act').

== Background ==
Feversham was the eldest son of Charles Duncombe (subsequently (1826) created Baron Feversham), (Note: an earlier Duncombe had also been created Baron Feversham but his line - and therefore that title - had become extinct: Charles was therefore the first baron of the second creation, but was occasionally erroneously (and potentially confusingly) described as the second baron. There was no connection with the Lord Feversham who had served James II) and Lady Charlotte, daughter of William Legge, 2nd Earl of Dartmouth. He was born at the family's town house in London (their country seat was at Duncombe Park, just outside Helmsley in the North Riding). (Note: The associated estate (of some 40,000 acres, including (as well as the ruins of Rievaulx Abbey) almost the entire parish of Kirkbymoorside, whose freeholders were noted in 1834 to have voted overwhelmingly for Duncombe) had been purchased for £90,000 in 1690 by Charles Duncombe a City of London financier who, although eventually knighted and a Lord Mayor of London, had narrowly escaped confiscation of most of his £400,000 fortune after he confessed to his involvement in a fraud on the Exchequer. Prior to this, the Duncombes had had no connection with Yorkshire) He was educated at Eton and Christ Church, Oxford. In 1820, he was commissioned as a cornet in the Helmsley Yeomanry Cavalry; in 1821 he qualified as a Justice of the peace for the North Riding; by 1826, however, he was living near Doncaster. (Note: and probably as early as his marriage in 1823, shortly before which he was appointed major in a West Riding volunteer regiment: in 1826 his residence was given as Burghwallis when his eldest son Albert was christened there (by his uncle Henry)) His younger brothers included the Hon. Arthur Duncombe and the Hon. Octavius Duncombe. (Note: Others were the Hon. and Rev. Henry Duncombe (1800-32) at his death (at Tunbridge Wells, having previously travelled to Madeira for his health, which might suggest consumption) Rector of Kirby Misperton (a living worth £1000 a year to which the Duncombes had the presentation), the Hon. George Duncombe (1804-1826) an ensign and lieutenant in the Grenadier Guards, the Hon. Adolphus Duncombe (1809-1830) Commoner of Christ Church, Oxford, and the Hon. and Very Rev. Augustus Duncombe (1814-1880) Dean of York. (When Augustus was appointed in 1858, it was noted than the deanery (worth £1000 a year) was the first ecclesiastical 'plum' to fall vacant during the premiership of Lord Derby, that Augustus already held church offices bringing in £12000 a year, had a private fortune, rode to hounds and was the brother of two Conservative MPs and a Conservative peer. The appointment was challenged in Parliament, Disraeli responding that the office was no plum; it had formerly brought in £3000 - £4000 a year, but church reform had reduced the income with any corresponding reduction in obligations; to appoint anyone without private means would be to put them in an invidious position. Furthermore, Disraeli was able to produce an unsolicited recommendation of Augustus by the current Archbishop of York, a Whig appointee. At Augustus's death, his estate was valued at half a million pounds despite his having been 'a munificent benefactor to the fabric of the cathedral').)

== Public life ==
When the colourful Radical MP Thomas Slingsby Duncombe died in 1861, it was noted in a piece appearing in a number of newspapers that

The most comical contrast to Tom Duncombe was his cousin, the present Lord Feversham, a heavy, solid, goodnatured man, whose speeches are of the most ponderous and soporific character - "a man whose talk is of bullocks" and whose opinions were of the extreme Conservative and Protectionist colour.

=== Agriculturalist ===
When Faversham talked of bullocks, he did so as one of the leading breeders and exhibitors of short-horn cattle; animals from the Duncombe Park herd won prizes at Smithfield, at the Royal Agricultural Show, and at the Paris International Exposition of 1855, although he came to deplore the prevalence of judging criteria which led to prizes going to animals which had been over-fattened, to the detriment of their health and that of the breed. He was deeply involved with the Royal Agricultural Society, serving as its president in 1863–4, and with the Smithfield Show Club (president in 1862) as well as local and county agricultural shows. (Note: When in 1858 his bull '5th Duke of Oxford' gored and trampled to death a Helmsley innkeeper who got into his stall to inspect him at close quarters, it was at the Yorkshire Show, where the bull had just won first prize.) His final parliamentary speech was (in 1866) an attack on the inadequacy of the government's response to the current cattle plague outbreak:

=== Political views ===
Duncombe was a Tory; seconding the Loyal Address in 1822, he said that "the constitution stood so firm on its basis, was so beautifully connected in all its parts, and was so admirably adapted to all classes of society, that it was impossible but that all who enjoyed the blessing of living under it should perceive its advantages over any other system of government." Consequently, Duncombe was opposed to the great liberal causes of his time (Catholic emancipation, parliamentary reform, abolition of the corn laws) but he did not seek to reverse them. When the Duke of Wellington decided that Catholic emancipation had to be conceded, Duncombe remained opposed to any measure of Catholic emancipation; once the measure was passed he accepted it was irreversible, but remained unreconciled to those who had granted it (an 'ultra-Tory').

=== Factory Reform ===
Duncombe rarely spoke in Parliament, other than to present petitions. However, he gave his moral support to (and exerted himself on behalf of) the Factory Reform movement; when Richard Oastler wrote to MPs in 1831 seeking their support, Duncombe was the only one to reply. Duncombe spoke at the great York Factory Reform meeting of 1832, despite his concern that his past political activity would taint the cause: he stressed 'this is not the cause of party.. It is the cause of justice .. It is the cause of real humanity, of Christian benevolence ... it is the cause of the oppressed and the industrious poor' One of his rare parliamentary speeches was to second the Second Reading of the Factories Act 1847 (the Ten-Hour Act). He spoke in favour of a "bona fide ten-hours" amendment to the Factories Bill of 1850 (the Compromise Act), and also voted to include "children" in the provisions of the bill. in the week of his death, a letter from him offering his support for agitation for an eight-hour act was read out by the chairman of a meeting in Manchester. On Feversham's death in 1867, the Yorkshire Post noted that Oastler had "constantly alluded to the unfailing support he received from Lord Feversham in battling with the opponents of the bill as his principal mainstay and encouragement in the work they had undertaken"

=== Opposition to the Poor Law Commission ===
Like Oastler, he opposed the Poor Law Amendment Act 1834: he voted against its Third Reading (but he had been absent from all of the committee stage proceedings). Debating the Whig Poor Law Amendment Bill of 1841 (intended to extend the life of the Poor Law Commission for five years) he denounced the 1834 act:

"It was a measure which made poverty a crime; which incarcerated men who were guilty of no other crime but misery and distress, in gaols and dungeons; which cut asunder the dearest ties of human nature, fathers from their children, husbands from their wives; and it was a measure in his belief calculated more than any other to alienate the feelings of the people from the laws and institutions of their country, and upon these grounds he was determined to give it his strenuous and uncompromising opposition."

In the subsequent committee stage of the bill he repeatedly voted for amendments returning powers from the Poor Law Commission to the local guardians – most notably he was teller for an amendment removing the supervisory powers of the commission: his one recorded vote against an amendment to the bill was against one making borrowing by guardians dependent on prior approval by a vestry meeting.

=== Support for Richard Oastler ===
His support of Oastler was not only political but personal. In 1838, he presented a petition from Huddersfield supporting the refusal of its magistrates to call out the military to suppress anti-Poor Law disturbances in which Oastler had been prominent. In 1840 he intervened in a Commons debate to obtain the retraction of a description of Oastler as an incendiary by a government minister. He visited Oastler in debtors' prison, and was a trustee of the Oastler Testimonial Fund (later the Oastler Liberation Fund), and prominent in raising the money to secure the release of Oastler (being one of the guarantors who met the shortfall in the money raised to satisfy Oastler's creditor).

=== Career as MP ===
In 1820 he stood with and was elected with Charles Tennyson Member of Parliament for the two-member borough constituency of Great Grimsby. Tennyson asserted his constituents had represented to him the need for both members for the seat to hold similar views; acceding to their wishes he had selected Duncombe as his running mate. Duncombe admitted to having no prior connection with the constituency but promised to assiduously promote its interests

In 1825 Duncombe was called upon to stand for election as a 'firm upholder of the Protestant cause' (opponent of Catholic emancipation) in the prestigious four-member county constituency of Yorkshire. Duncombe acceded to the requisition and stood for Yorkshire, rather than Grimsby. On election day in June 1826 only four candidates (two Whig, two 'no Popery' Tories) were nominated, and therefore all (including Duncombe) were elected unopposed. Catholic emancipation split the Tories, and the Ultras (including Duncombe) withdrew their support from the government. In 1830, when Duncombe stood again for Yorkshire, Henry Brougham, a Whig-Radical standing in the same constituency said of him

Mr Duncombe is a man from whom I differ. I differed from him in respect of the Test acts and on the Catholic Bill. But we have sat in Parliament two years on the same benches, and I declare to you I never saw a man whose conduct did him more honour, or who was more perfectly independent. He has despised place and power, and given an honest and consistent opposition to many of the measures of government, and I can scarcely call to mind one question upon which, during the two years I have mentioned, we have voted on opposite sides. I think it fair to say thus much, for many men might be offered to you who would be much less deserving of your support than is the Hon. William Duncombe

None of Duncombe's previous colleagues offered themselves for re-election in 1830, but again there were three other candidates with significant backing (Brougham, another Whig, and a Wellingtonian Tory). Unlike the election of 1826 they were not immediately elected: this time a fifth candidate nominated himself and demanded a poll, The fifth candidate having received a mere handful of votes by the end of the first day of polling, the poll was closed on the second day, at which point Duncombe was third (behind the two Whig candidates). The four remaining candidates were therefore declared elected. In the 1831 general election, Duncombe was again requisitioned to stand: he accepted the invitation, but withdrew before the actual poll, it being clear that Reform candidates would take all four seats.

In the reformed parliament, there were separate two-member county constituencies for each of the three ridings of Yorkshire. Duncombe stood in the North Riding of Yorkshire as the sole Tory candidate. In December 1832 he headed the poll ahead of two competing Reformers; John Charles Ramsden (supported by the Whig grandees) a West Riding industrialist and former Whig MP for Yorkshire, and Edward Stillingfleet Cayley, an independent of Liberal sympathies who farmed locally and put himself forward as a friend of the interests of small agriculturalists: Cayley took the second seat. In the election of January 1835 the constituency was contested by the two sitting MPs and a second Tory: despite (it was alleged) the Tories freely opening their purses the two MPs were reelected: at a November 1835 meeting they agreed that their first concern was to protect agricultural interests, regardless of party labels. They were returned unopposed in 1837, and again in 1841, but ten days after Duncome's re-election in 1841 election his father died, and Duncombe took his seat in the House of Lords: in the consequent by-election Duncombe's brother Octavius was elected unopposed.

=== Parliamentary proprietor ===
From 1832 to 1881, when Feversham's grandson Viscount Helmsley died, the North Riding always returned one Duncombe or another as one of its MPs. Usually, the other MP was a Liberal; an 1862 by-election which briefly gave the riding two Conservative MPs saw this analysis from a Liberal newspaper: "Lord Feversham is a great Parliamentary proprietor. He keeps several seats in the House of Commons, at great expense and with jealous care; and very naturally he does as he will with his own. When one of his Parliamentary saddles is vacant a relative usually has the preference. Three of the favoured family happen just now to be thus mounted. Nobody ever hears of them in the legislative field; but who has any right to ask a question? By the law of the land the head of the House of Duncombe has the might to be represented in the Lower House of Parliament by three of his immediate kinsmen, and in our electoral system might is right."

== Marriage and children ==
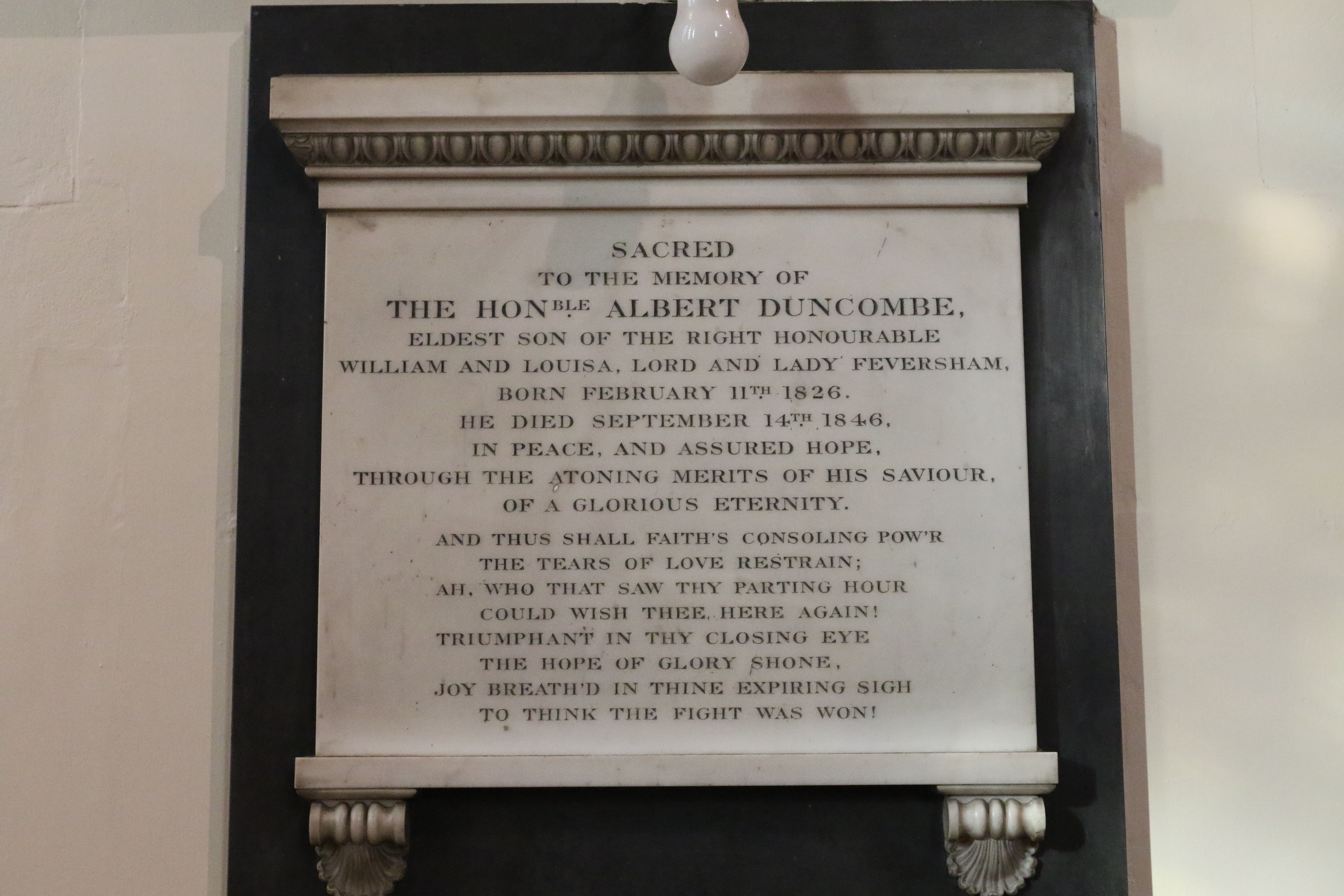
Memorial to Albert (1826–1846) in the Church of All Saints, Helmsley

Lord Feversham married, in 1823, Lady Louisa Stewart, the youngest daughter of Admiral George Stewart, 8th Earl of Galloway. They had six children. He died in February 1867, aged 69, and was succeeded by his son, William Ernest, who was created Earl of Feversham the following year. Lady Feversham died in March 1889.

Children:

- Jane b 1824 m (1849) Lawrence Parsons, brother of the Earl of Rosse
- Albert (1826–1846) died at Cowes from 'a raging malady' (consumption)
- Gertrude b 1827 m Francis Horatio FitzRoy, a grandson of Augustus FitzRoy, 3rd Duke of Grafton
- William Duncombe, 1st Earl of Feversham (1829–1915)
- Helen b 1831 m (1855) William Beckett-Denison
- Hon. Cecil Duncombe (1832–1902), a Captain of the 1st Life Guards, Deputy Lieutenant and County Councillor for North Riding of Yorkshire, and director of the North Eastern Railway; m. Eleanor Jane Mills, daughter of Sir Charles Mills, 1st Baronet.

The Grade II* listed Feversham Monument, "erected by his tenantry, friends and relations, who cherish his memory with affection and gratitude" stands in the middle of the market square of Helmsley, North Yorkshire. The monument (by Sir George Gilbert Scott) reportedly cost £800 raised by public subscription; the statue it houses cost £600 and was paid for by the Duncombe family.

== Notes ==
Parliament of the United Kingdom
Preceded by John Nicholas Fazakerley; Charles Tennyson	Member of Parliament for Great Grimsby; 1820–1826; With: Charles Tennyson	Succeeded by Charles Wood; George Heneage
Preceded by Viscount Milton; James Stuart-Wortley (representation increased to four members 1826)	Member of Parliament for Yorkshire; 1826–1831; With: Viscount Milton 1826–1830; Richard Fountayne-Wilson 1826–1830; John Marshall 1826–1830; Viscount Morpeth 1830–1831; Henry Brougham 1830; Richard Bethell 1830–1831; Sir John Vanden-Bempde-Johnstone, Bt 1830–1831	Succeeded by Viscount Morpeth; Sir John Vanden-Bempde-Johnstone, Bt; George Strickland; John Charles Ramsden
New constituency	Member of Parliament for the North Riding of Yorkshire; 1832–1841; With: Edward Cayley	Succeeded by Edward Cayley; Hon. Octavius Duncombe
Peerage of the United Kingdom
Preceded by Charles Duncombe	Baron Feversham; 1841–1867; Member of the House of Lords (1841–1867)	Succeeded by William Duncombe
