= Guy Dawnay (politician) =

British politician (1848-1889)

Guy Cuthbert Dawnay (26 July 1848 – 28 February 1889) was a Conservative politician. He was killed by a wounded buffalo near Mombassa in East Africa.

Dawnay was the fourth son of William Dawnay, 7th Viscount Downe, and his wife Mary Isabel, daughter of the Right Reverend the Hon. Richard Bagot, Bishop of Oxford. He was educated at Eton and Oxford. Dawnay fought at the Battle of Gingindlovu (1879) as a volunteer and also in Egypt in 1882 and at Suakin (in Transport Dept.) in 1885. He entered Parliament for the North Riding of Yorkshire at a by-election in 1882, a seat he held until the 1885 election, when he was defeated for the new Cleveland constituency. He served in the Conservative administration of Lord Salisbury as Surveyor-General of the Ordnance from 1885 to 1886. He was appointed a Deputy Lieutenant for the North Riding of Yorkshire on 20 December 1880.

Copies of his private journals from 1872 to 1874 are held by Campbell Collections at the University of KwaZulu-Natal.

There are memorials to Dawnay at St Nicolas Church, Great Bookham and St Peter's Church, Langdale End.

== See also ==
- Viscount Downe

Parliament of the United Kingdom
Preceded by Sir Frederick Milbank; Viscount Helmsley	Member of Parliament for the North Riding of Yorkshire; 1882–1885; With: Sir Frederick Milbank	Constituency abolished
Political offices
Preceded by Henry Brand	Surveyor-General of the Ordnance; 1885–1886	Succeeded by William Woodall
