= William Morritt =

William John Sawrey Morritt (c. 1813 – 13 April 1874) was a British Conservative Party politician from Rokeby, which was then in Yorkshire but is now in County Durham.

He was elected as a member of parliament (MP) for the North Riding of Yorkshire at a by-election in March 1862, following the death of the Liberal MP Edward Stillingfleet Cayley. He held the seat until the 1865 general election, when he was defeated by the Liberal Frederick Milbank.

Parliament of the United Kingdom
Preceded by Edward Stillingfleet Cayley; William Duncombe	Member of Parliament for the North Riding of Yorkshire; 1862 – 1865; With: William Duncombe	Succeeded by Frederick Milbank; William Duncombe
