= Charles Duncombe, 1st Baron Feversham =

British politician

Arms of Duncombe: Per chevron engrailed gules and argent, three talbot's heads erased counterchanged

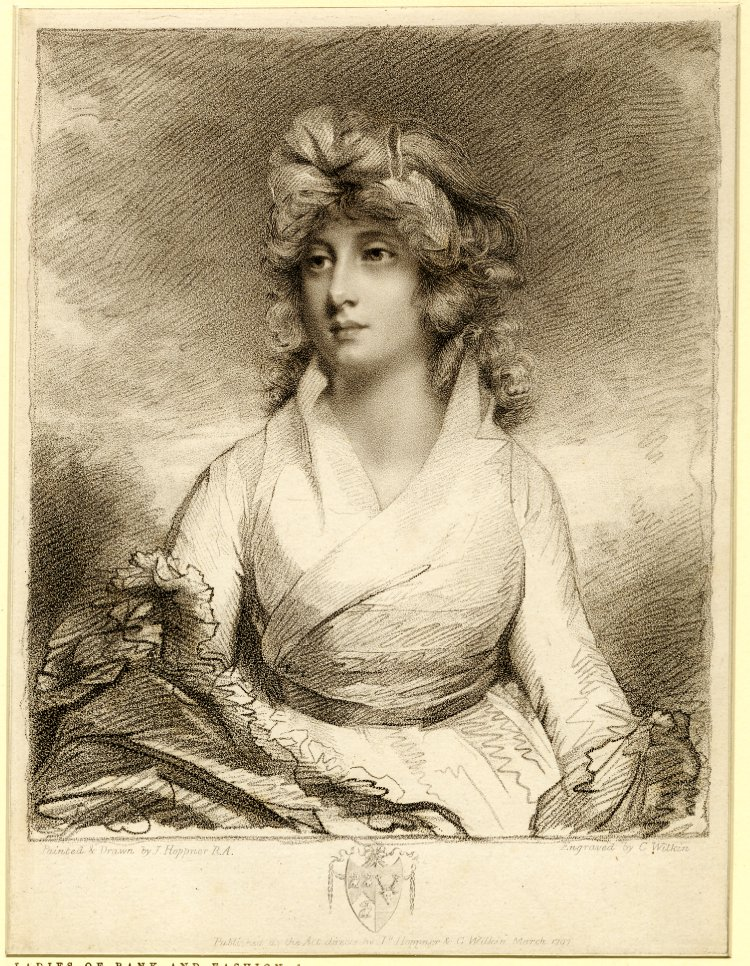
Lady Charlotte Legge

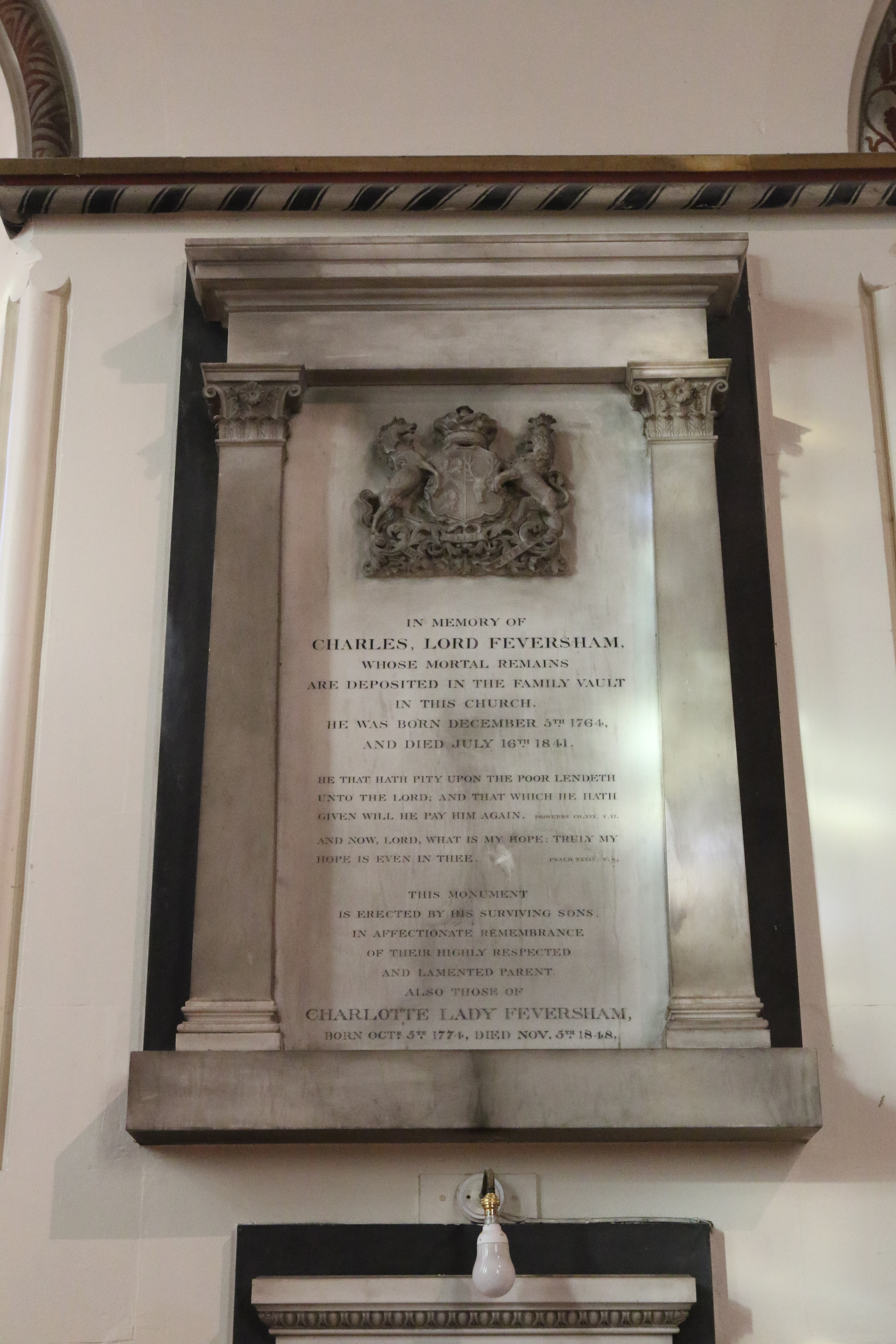
Memorial in the Church of All Saints, Helmsley

Charles Duncombe, 1st Baron Feversham (5 December 1764 – 16 July 1841), was a British Member of Parliament.

== Biography ==
Feversham was born the eldest son of Charles Slingsby Duncombe of Duncombe Park and educated at Harrow school (1799).

Feversham was appointed High Sheriff of Yorkshire in 1790. He was elected to the House of Commons for Shaftesbury in 1790, a seat he held until 1796, and then represented Aldborough from 1796 to 1806, Heytesbury from 1812 to 1816 and Newport, Isle of Wight from 1818 to 1826. However, he never held ministerial office. On 14 July 1826 he was raised to the peerage as Baron Feversham, of Duncombe Park in the County of York.

== Marriage and children ==
Lord Feversham married Lady Charlotte Legge, daughter of William Legge, 2nd Earl of Dartmouth, in 1795. They had eight children together:

- Frances Duncombe (born 30 May 1803, died 15 June 1881)
- Louisa Duncombe (born 16 November 1807, died 18 November 1852)
- Charles Duncombe (born 29 July 1796, died 2 April 1819)
- William Duncombe, 2nd Baron Feversham (born 14 January 1798, died 11 February 1867)
- Henry Duncombe (born 25 August 1800, died 1 October 1832)
- Arthur Duncombe (born 24 March 1806, died 6 February 1889)
- Augustus Duncombe, (born 2 November 1814, died 26 January 1880), Dean of York 1858–1880.
- Octavius Duncombe (born 8 April 1817, died 3 December 1879)

Feversham died in July 1841, aged 76, and was succeeded in the barony by his son William. His younger sons Arthur and Octavius were both Conservative politicians who served in Parliament. Lady Feversham died in 1848.

Parliament of Great Britain
Preceded by Hans Winthrop Mortimer; John Drummond	Member of Parliament for Shaftesbury; 1790–1796; With: William Grant 1790–1793; Paul Benfield 1793–1796	Succeeded by Paul Benfield; Walter Boyd
Preceded by John Gally-Knight; Trench Chiswell	Member of Parliament for Aldborough; 1796–1800; With: Trench Chiswell 1796–1797; John Blackburn from 1797	Succeeded by Parliament of the United Kingdom
Parliament of the United Kingdom
Preceded by Parliament of Great Britain	Member of Parliament for Aldborough; 1801–1806; With: John Blackburn to 1802; John Sullivan 1802–1806	Succeeded by Henry Fynes; Gilbert Jones
Preceded by Charles Moore; The Viscount FitzHarris	Member of Parliament for Heytesbury; 1812–1818; With: Samuel Hood	Succeeded by George James Welbore Agar-Ellis; William Henry John Scott
Preceded by Sir Leonard Worsley-Holmes; George Watson-Taylor	Member of Parliament for Newport, Isle of Wight; 1818–1826; With: Sir Leonard Worsley-Holmes 1818–1825; John Stuart 1825–1826	Succeeded by George Canning; William Henry John Scott
Peerage of the United Kingdom
New creation	Baron Feversham; 2nd creation 1826–1841	Succeeded by William Duncombe
