= Octavius Duncombe =

British politician (1817–1879)

The Hon. Octavius Duncombe (8 April 1817 – 3 December 1879) was a British Conservative politician.

== Background ==
Duncombe was a younger son of Charles Duncombe, 1st Baron Feversham, and Lady Charlotte, daughter of William Legge, 2nd Earl of Dartmouth. Admiral the Hon. Arthur Duncombe was his elder brother. He served in the 1st Life Guards and afterwards became Colonel of the Cambridgeshire Militia on 2 August 1852.

== Political career ==
Duncombe was elected Member of Parliament for the North Riding of Yorkshire in 1841, a seat he held until 1859, and again between 1867 and 1874.

== Family ==
Duncombe married Lady Emily Caroline, daughter of John Campbell, 1st Earl Cawdor, in 1842. The family had homes at Westerdale Hall in Yorkshire and Waresley Hall, Cambridgeshire.

They had two children, a son Walter, and daughter Maud. Maud married Lord Calthorpe.

Duncombe died in December 1879, aged 62. Lady Emily Duncombe died in March 1911.

Parliament of the United Kingdom
| Preceded by Hon. William Duncombe; Edward Stillingfleet Cayley | Member of Parliament for the North Riding of Yorkshire; 1841–1859; With: Edward Stillingfleet Cayley | Succeeded by Edward Stillingfleet Cayley; Hon. William Duncombe |
| Preceded by Hon. William Duncombe; Sir Frederick Milbank, Bt | Member of Parliament for the North Riding of Yorkshire; 1867–1874; With: Sir Frederick Milbank, Bt | Succeeded by Sir Frederick Milbank, Bt; Viscount Helmsley |
