= North Riding of Yorkshire (constituency) =

Parliamentary constituency in the United Kingdom, 1832–1885

- Former county constituency for the House of Commons
- North Riding of Yorkshire, within Yorkshire, 1832–1868 Location of Yorkshire within England
- County: North Riding of Yorkshire

1832–1885
- Seats: Two
- Created from: Yorkshire
- Replaced by: Cleveland, Richmond, Thirsk & Malton and Whitby

North Riding of Yorkshire was the constituency of the North Riding of Yorkshire. It returned two Members of Parliament to the House of Commons of the Parliament of the United Kingdom.

The constituency was created by the Reform Act 1832, when the four-seat Yorkshire constituency was divided in three for the 1832 general election. It was abolished by the Redistribution of Seats Act 1885, and replaced for the 1885 general election by the new single-member constituencies of Cleveland, Richmond, Thirsk & Malton and Whitby, most its remaining small boroughs seeing disenfranchisement in 1868 or in 1885.

== Members of Parliament ==
=== MPs 1654–1658 (Protectorate Parliaments) ===
Election	First member	Second member	Third member	Fourth member
1654	Lord Eure	Francis Lascelles	Thomas Harrison	George Smithson
1656	?	Francis Lascelles	Luke Robinson	?

=== MPs 1832–1885 ===
Election	1st Member	1st Party	2nd Member	2nd Party
1832	constituency created by division of the Yorkshire constituency			
1832	Hon. William Duncombe	Conservative	Edward Cayley	Whig
1841 by-election	Hon. Octavius Duncombe	Conservative	Edward Cayley	Whig
1859	Hon. William Duncombe	Conservative	Edward Cayley	Liberal
1862 by-election	Hon. William Duncombe	Conservative	William Morritt	Conservative
1865	Hon. William Duncombe	Conservative	Frederick Milbank	Liberal
1867 by-election	Hon. Octavius Duncombe	Conservative	Frederick Milbank	Liberal
1874	Viscount Helmsley	Conservative	Frederick Milbank	Liberal
1882 by-election	Hon. Guy Dawnay	Conservative	Frederick Milbank	Liberal
1885	constituency abolished: see Cleveland, Richmond, Thirsk & Malton and Whitby			

== Election results ==
=== Elections in the 1830s ===
General election 1832: North Riding of Yorkshire
Party	Candidate	Votes	%
Tory	William Duncombe	4,885	41.9
Whig	Edward Cayley	3,287	28.2
Whig	John Charles Ramsden	2,895	24.8
Whig	Martin Stapylton	602	5.2
Turnout		8,581	90.0
Registered electors		9,539	
Majority		1,598	13.7
Tory win (new seat)			
Majority		392	3.4
Whig win (new seat)			

General election 1835: North Riding of Yorkshire
Party	Candidate	Votes	%	±%
Conservative	William Duncombe	4,656	35.9	−6.0
Whig	Edward Cayley	4,490	34.6	+6.4
Conservative	James Walker	3,841	29.6	N/A
Turnout		8,396	88.0	−2.0
Registered electors		9,545		
Majority		166	1.3	−12.4
Conservative hold		Swing	−6.2	
Majority		649	5.0	+1.6
Whig hold		Swing	+6.2	

General election 1837: North Riding of Yorkshire
Party	Candidate	Votes	%
Conservative	William Duncombe	Unopposed	
Whig	Edward Cayley	Unopposed	
Registered electors		11,738	
Conservative hold			
Whig hold			

=== Elections in the 1840s ===
General election 1841: North Riding of Yorkshire
Party	Candidate	Votes	%	±%
Conservative	William Duncombe	Unopposed		
Whig	Edward Cayley	Unopposed		
Registered electors		11,361		
Conservative hold				
Whig hold				

Duncombe succeeded to the peerage, becoming 2nd Baron Feversham and causing a by-election.

By-election, 21 September 1841: North Riding of Yorkshire
Party	Candidate	Votes	%	±%
Conservative	Octavius Duncombe	Unopposed		
Conservative hold				

General election 1847: North Riding of Yorkshire
Party	Candidate	Votes	%	±%
Conservative	Octavius Duncombe	Unopposed		
Whig	Edward Cayley	Unopposed		
Registered electors		11,881		
Conservative hold				
Whig hold				

=== Elections in the 1850s ===
General election 1852: North Riding of Yorkshire
Party	Candidate	Votes	%	±%
Conservative	Octavius Duncombe	Unopposed		
Whig	Edward Cayley	Unopposed		
Registered electors		11,319		
Conservative hold				
Whig hold				

General election 1857: North Riding of Yorkshire
Party	Candidate	Votes	%	±%
Conservative	Octavius Duncombe	5,259	37.3	N/A
Whig	Edward Cayley	4,641	32.9	N/A
Whig	John Dundas	4,185	29.7	N/A
Majority		618	4.4	N/A
Turnout		9,672 (est)	79.0 (est)	N/A
Registered electors		12,238		
Conservative hold				
Whig hold				

General election 1859: North Riding of Yorkshire
Party	Candidate	Votes	%	±%
Conservative	Octavius Duncombe	Unopposed		
Liberal	Edward Cayley	Unopposed		
Registered electors		13,479		
Conservative hold				
Liberal hold				

=== Elections in the 1860s ===
Cayley's death caused a by-election.

By-election, 17 March 1862: North Riding of Yorkshire
Party	Candidate	Votes	%	±%
Conservative	William Morritt	5,507	52.2	N/A
Liberal	Frederick Milbank	5,041	47.8	N/A
Majority		466	4.4	N/A
Turnout		10,548	78.9	N/A
Registered electors		13,367		
Conservative gain from Liberal				

General election 1865: North Riding of Yorkshire
Party	Candidate	Votes	%	±%
Liberal	Frederick Milbank	6,585	35.0	N/A
Conservative	William Duncombe	6,362	33.8	N/A
Conservative	William Morritt	5,889	31.3	N/A
Majority		223	1.2	N/A
Turnout		12,711 (est)	82.3 (est)	N/A
Registered electors		15,438		
Liberal hold				
Conservative hold				

Duncombe was elevated to the peerage, becoming 3rd Lord Feversham, and causing a by-election.

By-election, 4 March 1867: North Riding of Yorkshire
Party	Candidate	Votes	%	±%
Conservative	Octavius Duncombe	Unopposed		
Conservative hold				

General election 1868: North Riding of Yorkshire
Party	Candidate	Votes	%	±%
Conservative	Octavius Duncombe	7,689	45.7	+11.9
Liberal	Frederick Milbank	7,429	44.1	+9.1
Conservative	Edward Stillingfleet Cayley (jnr)	1,721	10.2	−21.1
Turnout		15,118 (est)	78.7 (est)	−3.6
Registered electors		19,205		
Majority		260	1.6	
Conservative hold		Swing	+3.9	
Majority		5,708	33.9	+32.7
Liberal hold		Swing	+6.9	

=== Elections in the 1870s ===
General election 1874: North Riding of Yorkshire
Party	Candidate	Votes	%	±%
Conservative	William Duncombe	Unopposed		
Liberal	Frederick Milbank	Unopposed		
Registered electors		19,558		
Conservative hold				
Liberal hold				

=== Elections in the 1880s ===
General election 1880: North Riding of Yorkshire
Party	Candidate	Votes	%	±%
Conservative	William Duncombe	Unopposed		
Liberal	Frederick Milbank	Unopposed		
Registered electors		20,484		
Conservative hold				
Liberal hold				

Duncombe's death caused a by-election.

By-election, 26 Jan 1882: North Riding of Yorkshire
Party	Candidate	Votes	%	±%
Conservative	Guy Dawnay	8,135	51.2	N/A
Liberal	Samuel Rowlandson	7,749	48.8	N/A
Majority		386	2.4	N/A
Turnout		15,884	79.2	N/A
Registered electors		20,047		
Conservative hold				
