= William Duncombe, Viscount Helmsley =

British politician

Arms of Duncombe: Per chevron engrailed gules and argent, three talbot's heads erased counterchanged

William Reginald Duncombe, Viscount Helmsley (1 August 1852 – 24 December 1881), was a British Conservative Party politician.

Helmsley was the son of William Duncombe, 1st Earl of Feversham, and his wife Mabel Violet (née Graham), daughter of Sir James Graham, 2nd Baronet. He was elected to the House of Commons as one of two representatives for the North Riding of Yorkshire in the 1874 general election, a seat he held until his death seven years later.

Lord Helmsley married the seventeen-year-old Lady Muriel Frances Louisa, daughter of Charles Chetwynd-Talbot, 19th Earl of Shrewsbury, in 1876. They had one son and one daughter. Lady Helmsley was active in the Garden City movement.

- Lady Mabel Theresa Duncombe (1877–1913), who married Sir Gervase Beckett, 1st Baronet, as his first wife in 1895. He later remarried her sister-in-law Lady Feversham in 1917).
- Charles William Reginald Duncombe, 2nd Earl of Feversham (1879–1916)

He died in December 1881, at Madeira, aged only 29. His son Charles later succeeded in the earldom. Lady Helmsley later remarried in 1885, and died in March 1925.

== Notes ==
Parliament of the United Kingdom
Preceded by Frederick Milbank; Octavius Duncombe	Member of Parliament for the North Riding of Yorkshire; 1874–1881; With: Frederick Milbank	Succeeded by Frederick Milbank; Guy Dawnay
