= William Duncombe, 1st Earl of Feversham =

British politician

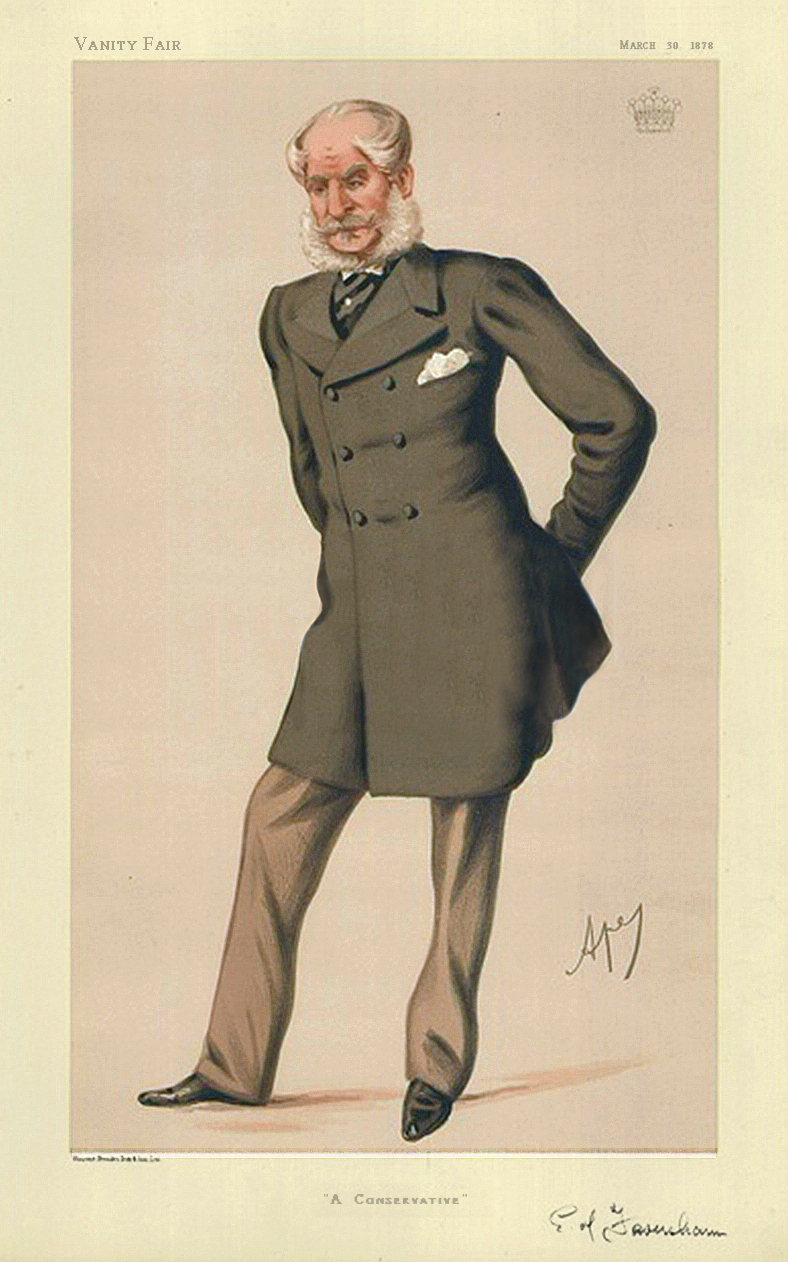
"a Conservative". Caricature by Ape published in Vanity Fair in 1878.

Arms of Duncombe: Per chevron engrailed gules and argent, three talbot's heads erased counterchanged

William Ernest Duncombe, 1st Earl of Feversham (28 January 1829 – 13 January 1915), known as The Lord Feversham between 1867 and 1868, was a British Conservative politician.

== Biography ==
Duncombe was the son of William Duncombe, 2nd Baron Feversham, and his wife Lady Louisa Stewart. He was elected to the House of Commons for East Retford in 1852, a seat he held until 1857, and then represented the North Riding of Yorkshire between 1859 and 1867. The latter year he succeeded his father in the barony and entered the House of Lords. In 1868 he was created Viscount Helmsley, of Helmsley in the North Riding of the County of York, and Earl of Feversham, of Ryedale in the North Riding of the County of York.

His annual rental income was about £34,000 a year.

== Marriage and children ==
Lord Feversham married Mabel Violet, daughter of Sir James Graham, 2nd Baronet, in 1851. They had seven children:

- Lady Mabel Cynthia Duncombe (born ?, died 25 April 1926)
- Lady Ulrica Duncombe (born 1875, died 27 April 1935), married Brigadier-General the Hon. Everard Baring, CBE, CVO, son of Edward Baring, 1st Baron Revelstoke
- Lady Helen Venetia Duncombe (born 1866, died 16 May 1954), married Edgar Vincent, 1st Viscount D'Abernon, no issue.
- William Reginald Duncombe, Viscount Helmsley (born 1 August 1852, died 24 December 1881), father of Charles Duncombe, 2nd Earl of Feversham
- Hon. James Henry Duncombe (born 20 October 1853, died 10 January 1886), unmarried.
- Hon. Hubert Ernest Valentine Duncombe, DSO (born 14 February 1862, died 21 October 1918), MP for Egremont 1895–1900, unmarried.
- Lady Hermione Wilhelmina Duncombe (born 30 March 1864, died 19 March 1895), married Gerald FitzGerald, 5th Duke of Leinster, mother of the 6th and 7th Dukes of Leinster.

In 1862, Lord Feversham was living in Grosvenor Square, and from 1868-1875, he leased 2 Albert Gate, Knightsbridge (now the Embassy of Kuwait).

Lord Feversham died in January 1915, aged 85, and was succeeded in his titles by his grandson Charles, his eldest son and heir apparent William having predeceased him. Lady Feversham died only seven months after her husband.

== Notes ==
Parliament of the United Kingdom
| Preceded by Arthur Duncombe; The Viscount Galway | Member of Parliament for East Retford; 1852–1857; With: The Viscount Galway | Succeeded by The Viscount Galway; Francis Foljambe |
| Preceded by Edward Stillingfleet Cayley; Octavius Duncombe | Member of Parliament for North Riding of Yorkshire; 1859–1867; With: Edward Stillingfleet Cayley 1859–1862; William John Sawrey Morritt 1862–1865; Frederick Milbank 1865–1867 | Succeeded by Frederick Milbank; Octavius Duncombe |
Peerage of the United Kingdom
| New creation | Earl of Feversham; 1868–1915 | Succeeded by Charles Duncombe |
| Preceded by William Duncombe | Baron Feversham; 1867–1915 | Succeeded by Charles Duncombe |
