= Old Vicarage, Helmsley =

Clergy house in Helmsley, North Yorkshire, England

Coordinates: 54°14′51″N 1°03′36″W

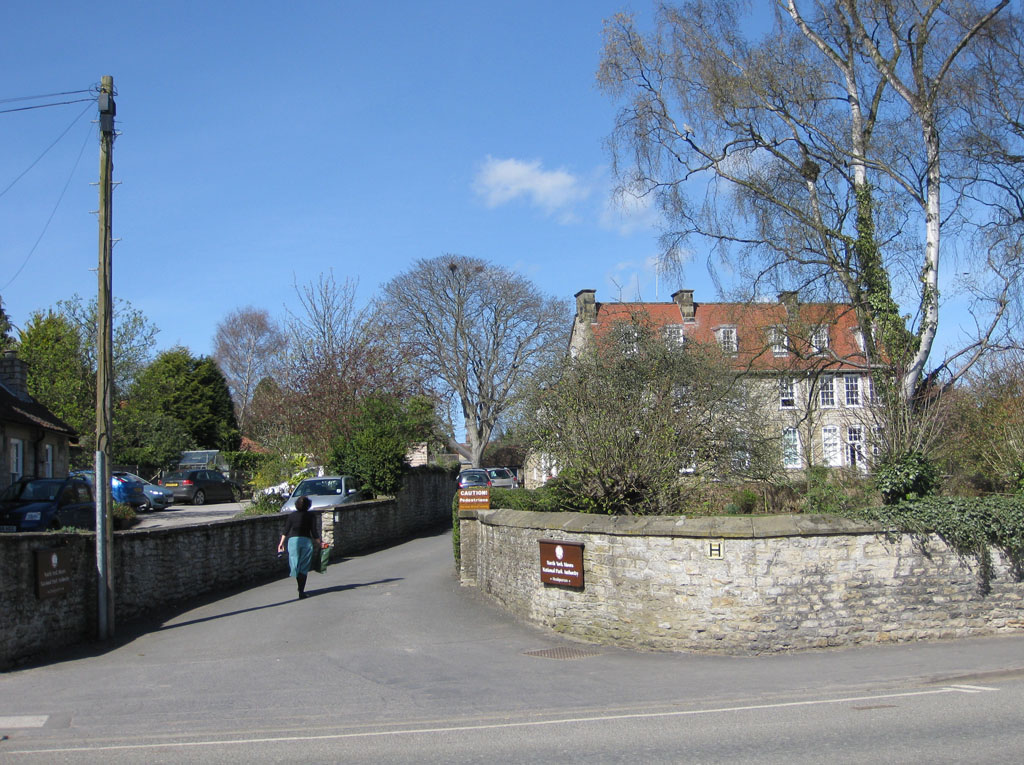
The building, in 2011

The Old Vicarage is a historic building in Helmsley, a town in North Yorkshire, in England.

The vicarage was commissioned by Charles Gray, the Vicar of All Saints' Church, Helmsley. Gray was known for training new clergy, and wanted to large vicarage in order to accommodate both himself and his trainees. He commissioned Temple Moore to design a building, which was completed in about 1900. It is in the Queen Anne style, in contrast to Moore's usual Gothic. In 1974, the building became the headquarters of the North York Moors National Park Authority, and the vicar moved to Canons Garth. The building was grade II listed in 1985. In 2024, the authority announced plans to move to a smaller, purpose-built headquarters, and to convert the Old Vicarage into housing.

The building is constructed of sandstone, and has a tile roof with gable coping and shaped kneelers. It has two storeys and an attic, and seven bays. On the front is a French window, and the windows are sashes, in the ground floor with cambered heads. In the attic are dormers containing sashes.

== See also ==
- Listed buildings in Helmsley
