= Listed buildings in Helmsley =

Helmsley is a civil parish in the county of North Yorkshire, England. It contains 72 listed buildings that are recorded in the National Heritage List for England. Of these, five are listed at Grade I, the highest of the three grades, seven are at Grade II*, the middle grade, and the others are at Grade II, the lowest grade. The parish contains the town of Helmsley and the surrounding countryside. In the parish is the country house of Duncombe Park, which is listed together with associated structures in the gardens and grounds. Also in the parish is Helmsley Castle, the remains of which are listed. Most of the other listed building are houses, cottages and associated structures, shops and offices. The others include churches, public houses and hotels, the market cross and a memorial in Market Place, bridges, farmhouses and farm buildings, former schools, the town hall and a telephone kiosk.

== Key ==
Grade	Criteria
I	Buildings of exceptional interest, sometimes considered to be internationally important
II*	Particularly important buildings of more than special interest
II	Buildings of national importance and special interest

== Buildings ==
Name and location	Photograph	Date	Notes	Grade
Helmsley Castle; 54.24503°N 1.06431°W		12th century	The castle, which has been extended and altered through the centuries, is built in sandstone and limestone, and is now a ruin with only parts remaining. The most substantial standing parts are the east tower, the chamber block and west tower, gateways and the curtain wall.	I
Canons Garth, doorway and wall 54.24733°N 1.06188°W		Late 14th century	The house has been altered through the centuries, including a restoration by Temple Moore. The ground floor is in sandstone, the upper parts are timber framed, and the roof is tiled. There are two storeys and attics, and the house consists of a main range and projecting cross-wings, all gabled. The windows are casements, and in the attic are gabled dormers. In front, there is a doorway and walls.	II*
Market Cross; 54.24634°N 1.06158°W		Medieval	The market cross in Market Place is in sandstone. It consists of an octagonal shaft with a cross on a square pedestal with six steps.	II
The Black Swan and railings 54.24673°N 1.06157°W		Late 16th century	The hotel was extended in the early 18th century and the early 19th century. The earliest part is timber framed and underbuilt with sandstone, and it has a tile roof. There are two storeys, a two-bay hall range, and a gabled cross wing on the left. It contains a doorway and casement windows. To the right is the 19th-century section, which is in rusticated sandstone with a Welsh slate roof. There are two storeys and three bays, and it contains sash windows. Further to the right is the 18th-century part which is in sandstone with a Welsh slate roof, three storeys and four bays. The doorway has engaged Tuscan columns, a blocked fanlight and an open pediment. In the ground floor are canted bay windows, and the upper floors contain casement windows, those in the middle floor with wedge lintels. In front of the whole of the hotel are plain wrought iron railings.	II
1 Bridge Street; 54.24598°N 1.06060°W		Mid 17th century (probable)	A house later used for other purposes, it is in rendered limestone and has a swept pantile roof. There are two storeys and two bays. In the centre is a doorway, the windows are horizontally-sliding sashes, and all have massive projecting lintels.	II
Feathers Hotel; 54.24615°N 1.06067°W		Mid 17th century	Two houses, the later one dating from the early 19th century, subsequently combined into a hotel, it is in sandstone with pantile roofs and gable coping. The older part to the left has two storeys and three bays and a central through-passage. This is flanked by bow windows, and in the upper floor are two casement windows and one horizontally-sliding sash window. The later part has three storeys and three bays, and a moulded cornice. It contains an Ionic doorway with a radial fanlight and an open pediment, bow windows in the ground floor and sashes above.	II
Formerly The Crown; 54.24677°N 1.06118°W		Mid 17th century (probable)	A hotel later used for other purposes, it is in whitewashed rendered limestone with partial moulding below the eaves, and a pantile roof. There are two storeys and an attic, three bays, the left bay projecting slightly. The doorway to the right has fluted pilasters and an open pediment. The windows are a mix of casements and horizontally-sliding sashes and in the attic are three dormers.	II
The Old Manor House; 54.24558°N 1.06182°W	—	17th century	The building is in two parts, both in sandstone with pantile roofs. The left range has a single storey, two bays, and an outshut on the left. It contains a wooden porch and casement windows. The right range has two storeys and two gabled bays. The ground floor contains a blocked doorway and casement windows, and above is timber framing with close studding, and in the gable is diamond framing.	II
Sundial, Duncombe Park; 54.23891°N 1.07273°W		c.1715	The sundial in the grounds to the east of the house, is in limestone. It depicts a winged figure of Father Time holding a decorative urn, on which is the sundial.	II
Ionic Temple, Duncombe Park; 54.24037°N 1.07174°W		c. 1718–24	The temple in the grounds of the house is in sandstone, and has a domed lead roof, and a circular plan. It consists of an open rotunda, with a stepped podium and nine unfluted Ionic columns, an architrave, a frieze and a dentilled cornice.	I
20 High Street; 54.24785°N 1.06404°W	—	Early 18th century	The house, which has earlier origins, has a cruck frame, and is in sandstone with a pantile roof.There are two storeys and three bays. The doorway is on the right, the windows are horizontally-sliding sashes, and the openings have wooden lintels. Inside, a pair of crucks are visible in the left end wall.	II
22 High Street; 54.24790°N 1.06415°W	—	Early 18th century	The house, which has earlier origins, is in sandstone with a pantile roof. There are two storeys and three bays. The doorway is on the left and has a wooden lintel, and the windows are horizontally-sliding sashes with stone lintels.	II
25 Ryegate; 54.24467°N 1.05782°W	—	Early 18th century	The house is in limestone with a pantile roof. There are two storeys and two bays. The doorway is in the centre, and the windows are 20th-century casements.	II
27 Ryegate; 54.24468°N 1.05772°W	—	Early 18th century	The house is in limestone with a pantile roof. There are two storeys and two bays. The doorway is in the centre, and the windows are horizontally-sliding sashes.	II
29 Ryegate; 54.24469°N 1.05765°W		Early 18th century	The house is in limestone with a pantile roof. There are two storeys and two bays. The windows are three-light horizontally-sliding sashes, and the entrance is in the later extension to the right.	II
Duncombe Park; 54.23907°N 1.07444°W		Early 18th century	A country house in stone, with a sill band, and a plain parapet with urns at the corners. There are two storeys, basements and attics, and a main front of eleven bays. The middle three bays project and contain a Tuscan portico with a triglyph frieze and a carved pediment. The outer bays also project and have Doric pilasters and triglyph friezes. The windows are sashes; in the central bays they are round-arched with keystones, and in the outer bays they have architraves with keystones and pediments. Behind the main parapet, the attic projects and has urns at the corners.	I
Former Laundry, Duncombe Park; 54.24099°N 1.07604°W		c. 1730	The building is in sandstone, and has a rectangular courtyard plan with one storey. In the centre is a doorway with a radial fanlight, flanked by four attached Tuscan columns, with an entablature and a stepped pediment. Between these are blind panels within colonnades. Outside, there are blank round-headed recesses under moulded cornices, flanked by low plain walls.	II*
Tuscan Temple, Duncombe Park; 54.23573°N 1.07019°W		c. 1730	The building in the grounds of the hall is in sandstone with a lead roof, and is in Palladian style. It has a circular plan, and is surrounded by Tuscan columns on a stepped podium. Within it is a room with a doorway, three sash windows, a plain frieze and a moulded cornice. This is surmounted by a circular drum containing a circular window and with a hemispherical lead-covered dome.	I
38 Bondgate; 54.24710°N 1.05907°W	—	Early to mid 18th century	The house, formerly a bakery, has a cruck frame, and is in limestone, overbuilt and extended in sandstone, and has a pantile roof. There are two storeys and four bays. The window to the left of the doorway is a modern casement, and the other windows are horizontally-sliding sashes. Inside, there are three pairs of crucks.	II
40 Bondgate; 54.24714°N 1.05894°W	—	Early to mid 18th century	The house is in sandstone with a pantile roof. There are two storeys, two bays, and a rear outshut. The doorway is in the centre, it is flanked by casement windows, and the windows in the upper floor are horizontally-sliding sashes.	II
42 Bondgate; 54.24717°N 1.05884°W	—	Early to mid 18th century	The house is in sandstone and limestone, with some brick infilling, and a swept pantile roof. There are two storeys and three bays. The doorway is in the left bay, and the windows are horizontally-sliding sashes.	II
36 Bondgate; 54.24702°N 1.05922°W	—	Mid 18th century	The house is in sandstone with a pantile roof. There are two storeys, two bays, and a rear outshut. The doorway is in the centre, and the windows are horizontally-sliding sashes.	II
The Orangery, Duncombe Park; 54.23680°N 1.07330°W		1751	The orangery, designed by Banks and Barry, is in sandstone, rusticated on the front, with a dentilled cornice and a plain parapet with urns. There is a single storey and eleven bays. The main central part has three bays and a flat roof, and contains three round-arched windows separated by Corinthian pilasters, paired on the corners. The four-bay wings are of half the height, and are roofless. They contain square unglazed window openings, between which are rusticated pilasters carrying a cornice.	II
23 Bondgate; 54.24744°N 1.05886°W		Mid to late 18th century	The house is in limestone and sandstone with a pantile roof. There are two storeys and two bays. The doorway is in the centre, and the windows are horizontally-sliding sashes with channelled lintels.	II
39 Bridge Street; 54.24490°N 1.05979°W		Late 18th century	The house is in sandstone, with quoins, and a pantile roof with gable coping and ornamental truncated cones. There are two storeys, the gable end faces the street, and has one bay. In the gable end is a two-storey round-arched recess containing a tripartite sash window in the ground floor, and a Diocletian window above, both under stone arches.	II
43 Bridge Street; 54.24472°N 1.05960°W	—	Late 18th century	The house is in limestone with a pantile roof, two storeys and three bays. The doorway is in the right bay, and the windows are sashes with stone sills and wooden lintels.	II
45 Bridge Street; 54.24463°N 1.05951°W	—	Late 18th century	The house is in sandstone and limestone and has a Westmorland slate roof. There are two storeys, two bays and a rear cross-wing. The doorway is in the centre, and the windows are sashes.	II
7 and 9 Castlegate; 54.24523°N 1.06086°W	—	Late 18th century	A farmhouse and adjoining farm building converted into a private house, it is in sandstone, and has a swept pantile roof with gable coping and shaped kneelers. The house has two storeys and three bays, and the farm buildings form a single-storey wing to the right. The house has a moulded eaves course, a doorway with a divided oblong fanlight, and horizontally-sliding sash windows, those in the upper floor with wedge lintels. In the wing is a door, a casement window and a garage door.	II
16 Castlegate; 54.24568°N 1.06200°W	—	Late 18th century	The house is in limestone, with a pantile roof, two storeys and three bays. The doorway is in the centre, to its left is a canted bay window, and the other windows are horizontally-sliding sashes with wedge lintels.	II
10 High Street; 54.24752°N 1.06355°W	—	Late 18th century	The house is in sandstone with pantile roofs, and in two parts, each with two storeys and two bays, the right part higher. The left part has a doorway and a casement window in the ground floor, and horizontally-sliding sashes above. In the right part is a shopfront to the right, the left bay contains sash windows, and in the upper floor right bay is a casement window.	II
24 and 26 High Street; 54.24794°N 1.06430°W	—	Late 18th century	A house, later divided into two, in sandstone, with massive quoins on the right, and a swept pantile roof with gable coping and shaped kneelers. The doorway has a stone lintel, and the windows, which are horizontally-sliding sashes, have flat brick arches.	II
30 High Street; 54.24807°N 1.06446°W	—	Late 18th century	The house is in sandstone, with a pantile roof, two storeys and two bays. It has a parapet with a band and coping he central doorway and the windows, which are sashes, have stone lintels.	II
13 Market Place; 54.24592°N 1.06134°W		Late 18th century	A house, later a shop, in limestone with a swept pantile roof. There are two storeys and two bays. In the ground floor is a shopfront, and the upper floor contains three-light horizontally-sliding sash windows.	II
Bridge over Borough Beck; 54.24597°N 1.06191°W		Late 18th century	The bridge, which carries a road over a stream, is in sandstone, and consists of a single segmental arch. It has a parapet with a band, and coping.	II
Piethorn Farmhouse; 54.32877°N 1.08210°W		Late 18th century	The farmhouse was extended in the early 19th century. It is in sandstone, with quoins, and roofs of Welsh slate and pantile with coped gables and shaped kneelers. The main part has two storeys and three bays. The entrance is at the rear, and the windows are sashes. The low end has a single storey and one bay, and it contains a doorway and casement windows.	II
Rye Bridge; 54.24416°N 1.05923°W		Late 18th century	The bridge, which has earlier origins, carries the A170 road over the River Rye. It is in sandstone and has two arches, pointed downstream and rounded upstream, with buttresses between them. The bridge has a band, a parapet and coping.	II
14, 15 and 16 Church Street; 54.24660°N 1.06312°W		c. 1780	A warehouse converted for other uses by 1830, it is in limestone with a sill band, a moulded cornice, and a slate roof with gable coping. There are three storeys and five bays. In the left bay is a doorway with a radial fanlight, and to the right is a carriage arch containing two doorways with blocked fanlights. The windows are sashes, those in the middle floor with lintels and keystones.	II
3 Bridge Street; 54.24590°N 1.06058°W		Late 18th to early 19th century	A shop in sandstone, with stepped eaves, and a pantile roof with gable coping and shaped kneelers. There are three storeys and two bays. In the ground floor is a 19th-century shopfront with five fluted pilasters, a moulded cornice and a fascia. The upper floors contain sash windows with wedge lintels.	II
19 Bridge Street; 54.24571°N 1.06045°W		Late 18th to early 19th century	A house later used for other purposes in sandstone, with quoins, a sill band, a coved eaves course, and a stone slate roof with gable coping. There are three storeys and a basement, and three bays. The central doorway has pilasters, a fanlight, and an open pediment, on the right is a blocked doorway with a rusticated surround, and above the doorway are blocked windows. The outer bays contain bow windows with pilasters and a moulded cornice in the ground floor, and in the upper floors are sash windows.	II
28 High Street; 54.24800°N 1.06441°W	—	Late 18th to early 19th century	The house is in sandstone with a swept pantile roof. There are two storeys and two bays. The doorway on the right and the windows, which are horizontally-sliding sashes, have stone lintels.	II
3, 5, 7, 9 and 11 Ryegate; 54.24454°N 1.05908°W		Late 18th to early 19th century	A terrace of five houses in sandstone and limestone with a pantile roof. There are two storeys and twelve bays. On the front are doorways of different styles, a shopfront, and windows that are a mix of casements and sashes.	II
Buckingham House, railings and gate 54.24505°N 1.05991°W		Late 18th to early 19th century	The house is in sandstone, with a coved eaves course, and a pantile roof with gable coping. There are two storeys and two bays. The central doorway has reeded pilasters, a radial fanlight, a frieze with paterae, and a dentilled open pediment, and the windows are sashes. In front of the garden are iron railings and a gate.	II
King's; 54.24592°N 1.06124°W		Late 18th to early 19th century	A house, later a shop, in limestone with pantile roofs. It is in two parts with shopfronts in both parts. The left part has three storeys and one bay, sash windows in the upper floors, and gable coping. The right part has two storeys and two bays, a hipped roof, and in the upper floor are a horizontally-sliding sash window on the left and a casement on the right.	II
Knipes Hall; 54.24733°N 1.06675°W	—	c. 1822	A school, later a house, in sandstone, with a floor band, and a stone slate roof with gable coping. There is a single storey and an attic, and four bays. The doorway has engaged Tuscan columns, a radial fanlight, fluted friezes, and an open pediment, and the windows are sashes.	II
1 Borogate; 54.24586°N 1.06115°W		Early 19th century	A house later used for other purposes, in limestone with a pantile roof. There are two storeys and an attic, and one bay. In the ground floor is a shopfront with a doorway to the right, the upper floor contains a sash window with a wedge lintel, and in the attic is a dormer with a casement window.	II
15 Bridge Street; 54.24589°N 1.06056°W		Early 19th century	A house, later a shop, in limestone, with sandstone quoins, a coved eaves course, and a pantile roof with gable coping and a shaped kneeler on the left. There are three storeys and one bay. In the ground floor is a passage on the left and a shopfront on the right, and the upper floors contain sash windows in architraves.	II
17 Bridge Street; 54.24580°N 1.06050°W		Early 19th century	A house, later a shop, in limestone, with sandstone quoins, and a Welsh slate roof with gable coping. There are three storeys and two bays. In the ground floor is a shallow bow window and a doorway with an oblong fanlight to the right, and the upper floors contain sash windows in stone surrounds.	II
41 Bridge Street and arch 54.24472°N 1.05961°W		Early 19th century	The house is in sandstone, with a modillion cornice, and a stone slate roof with gable coping. There are three storeys and a basement, a double depth plan, and three bays. Eight steps lead up to a doorway with attached Tuscan columns, a radial fanlight, a fluted frieze and an open pediment. The windows are sashes, and to the left an arch leads into the garden.	II
18 High Street; 54.24776°N 1.06393°W	—	Early 19th century	A house, at one time a shop, in sandstone, with a swept pantile roof. There are two storeys and four bays. In the ground floor is a doorway with pilasters and a decorative architrave, a casement window to the left, and to the right a shopfront, a horizontally-sliding sash window, a garage door and a plain doorway. The upper floor contains horizontally-sliding sashes with wedge lintels.	II
36, 38, 40, 44 and 46 High Street; 54.24836°N 1.06496°W	—	Early 19th century	A terrace of five houses in sandstone with a pantile roof. There are two storeys and nine bays. The doorways and the windows, which are horizontally-sliding sashes, have stone lintels.	II
Former Barclays Bank; 54.24651°N 1.06084°W		Early 19th century	A house, at one time a bank, in whitewashed brick, on a partial plinth, with sandstone dressings, quoins on the left, stepped and cogged eaves, and a pantile roof with gable coping and a shaped kneeler on the left. There are three storeys and four bays. In the left two bays are a bank front containing a doorway with a moulded surround, flanked by sash windows with architraves and elliptical heads with keystones. Elsewhere, there are sash windows, those above the bank front with stone surrounds and moulded lintels.	II
Duncombe Park Estate Office; 54.24516°N 1.06053°W	—	Early 19th century	A house, later an office, in limestone, with a pantile roof and gable coping. There are two storeys and four bays. The doorway has fluted pilasters, a radial fanlight and an open pediment. The windows are sashes, those in the ground floor with channelled lintel and keystones.	II
Middle Baxtons Farmhouse; 54.27247°N 1.08070°W	—	Early 19th century	The farmhouse is in limestone, and has a swept pantile roof with gable coping and a small skylight. There are two storeys and three bays, and a rear service wing. On the front is a wrought iron porch, and the windows are casements.	II
Former National Westminster Bank; 54.24652°N 1.06199°W		Early 19th century	Two houses later used for other purposes, in limestone with pantile roofs, gable coping, and an urn on the corner. The left house has two storeys and two bays. In the centre is a doorway, and the windows are sashes with stone lintels and keystones. The right house has three storeys and two bays. In the ground floor is a shopfront with a cornice on moulded brackets, and the upper floors contain sash windows, those in the middle floor with plain lintels.	II
Park House; 54.24483°N 1.06167°W	—	Early 19th century	A school, later a private house, it was extended in 1847. It is in sandstone, with quoins, and a Westmorland slate roof with gable coping. There are two bays, a main range of three bays, projecting cross-wings, and a rear extension. The central doorway has an oblong divided fanlight, and the windows are sashes. In the gables of the cross wings are eaves bands, and semicircular sunk panels.	II
The Co-op; 54.24635°N 1.06076°W		Early 19th century	Two houses, later a shop, in sandstone, with quoins, a coved eaves course, and a pantile roof with gable coping and a shaped kneeler on the right. There are three storeys and five bays. The ground floor contains a 20th-century shopfront, and in the upper floor, the second bay contains blocked windows, the fourth bay is blank, and the other bays contain sash windows with wedge lintels.	II
34 and 36 Castlegate; 54.24502°N 1.06101°W	—	Early to mid 19th century	A pair of mirror-image estate workers' cottages in sandstone with a Westmorland slate roof and gable coping and shaped kneelers on the left. There are two storeys, each cottage has one bay, and at the rear are outshuts. The doorways are in the outer parts, the windows in the centre are three-light cross windows, and all the openings have Tudor-style hood moulds.	II
9, 10 and 11 Market Place; 54.24592°N 1.06092°W		Early to mid 19th century	A row of three houses, later used for other purposes, in sandstone, with quoins, and a pantile roof with gable coping and shaped kneelers. There are two storeys and five bays. On the front are doorways, bow windows, a horizontally-sliding sash window and casement windows. Some of the openings have wedge lintels.	II
3 and 4 Buckingham Square; 54.24479°N 1.06084°W	—	c. 1843	A pair of estate workers' cottages in sandstone with a Westmorland slate roof. They are a pair of mirror-image semi-detached cottages, each with a single bay and an attic. The doorways are in the outer parts with Gothic-style joinery. Each cottage has a window and a dormer, both mullioned and transomed. The doorway and ground floor windows have hood moulds.	II
Duncombe Park Lodge; 54.24458°N 1.06194°W		1843	The lodge at the entrance to the grounds was designed by Charles Barry., and is in sandstone with a Welsh slate roof. There is a rectangular plan with projecting porch and a tetrastyle Tuscan portico. The doorway has Gothic glazing bars and a hood mould, and in the gable is a shield and a datestone.	II
Northern Stable Block, Duncombe Park; 54.23949°N 1.07497°W		1846	The stable block, designed by Charles Barry, is in sandstone, and forms an open courtyard with a quadrant wall to the east. There is one storey and an attic, and seven bays The outer bays are flanked by rusticated pilasters, and contain round-arched recesses, with semicircular windows above. The central bays form an arcade of round arches with keystones, and above is a dentilled cornice and a blank parapet. The corners rise to attics with corner urns. At the left is a clock tower with a curved pyramidal roof and a weathervane.	I
Ice house, Duncombe Park; 54.24172°N 1.07349°W	—	19th century	The ice house in the grounds of the house is in limestone. It has a passage with a round-arched doorway and a barrel vaulted roof leading to a circular sunken room, and a domed roof.	II
The Royal Oak; 54.24600°N 1.06156°W		Mid 19th century	The public house is in sandstone, with quoins, and a Welsh slate roof with gable coping. There are two storeys and an attic, and three bays. The central doorway has a plain surround and a dentilled cornice, and is flanked by canted bay windows. The upper floor contains sash windows, and in the attic are gabled dormers with sashes.	II
27–49 Bondgate; 54.24752°N 1.05808°W		1853–55	A row of estate workers' cottages in Vernacular Revival style, in stone with Welsh slate roofs. Each cottage has a single storey and an attic, they are in mirror-image pairs with paired entrances, and each cottage has a gable at the front and a share of a gable at the rear. There is one bay each and a shared rear outshut. Each cottage has a doorway with a dentilled hood mould. The windows are mullioned and transomed, with a wedge lintel and imitation voussoirs.	II
All Saints' Church; 54.24688°N 1.06254°W		1866–69	The church was largely rebuilt by Banks and Barry, incorporating earlier material from as far back as the 12th century. It is in sandstone with a stone slate roof, and consists of a nave, a north aisle, a south porch, north and south transepts, a chancel with a north vestry, and a west tower. The tower has three stages, paired round-arched bell openings, a plain parapet, and octagonal corner turrets with pyramidal roofs. The south doorway dates from the 12th century, and is round-arched with four orders. In the north transept is a rose window.	II*
Memorial to Second Baron Feversham; 54.24626°N 1.06116°W		1869–71	The memorial to William Duncombe, 2nd Baron Feversham is in Market Place. The statue of the baron is by Matthew Noble, and the canopy) was designed by George Gilbert Scott in Gothic Revival style. The statue is in limestone and consists of the baron standing on four steps in full regalia on a pedestal with a foliate frieze. The canopy is in sandstone and is carried on four buttressed columns with shafts and heraldic beasts with shields. It has four gables with corner crocketed finials, and the pinnacle has a two-light opening, crockets, finials and a cross.	II*
St Mary Magdalene's Church; 54.30511°N 1.06448°W		1881–82	The church was designed by George Gilbert Scott Jr. with assistance from Temple Moore. It is in sandstone, the roof of the nave is in Westmorland slate and that of the aisle is in lead. The church consists of a nave, a chancel, and a lean-to south aisle. At the west end is a bellcote with two Tudor arched bell openings, and a pinnacle with lucarnes and crockets.	II*
St Aidan's Church; 54.27211°N 1.06450°W		1885–86	The church, designed by Temple Moore, has been converted for residential use. It is in sandstone with a tile roof, and consists of a nave and a chancel under one roof, a south porch, and a west tower. The tower has a square plan, and contains a lancet window on the west side, string courses, and paired lancet bell openings, above which are circular openings with quatrefoil tracery. At the top is a pyramidal roof with a cross finial. The south doorway has a round arch with a moulded surround, above which is a niche containing a figure of Christ.	II*
The Old Vicarage; 54.24760°N 1.05995°W		1889–1900	The vicarage, later used as an office, was designed by Temple Moore in Queen Anne style. It is in sandstone, and has a tile roof with gable coping and shaped kneelers. There are two storeys and an attic, and seven bays. On the front is a French window, and the windows are sashes, in the ground floor with cambered heads. In the attic are dormers containing sashes.	II
Town Hall; 54.24614°N 1.06174°W		1900–02	The town hall was designed by Temple Moore in Queen Anne style. It is in sandstone, with a floor band, a coved cornice, and a hipped tile roof. There are two storeys and a U-shaped plan, with a front range of five bays. In the right bay is a round-headed doorway with a moulded surround and jambs, and a rusticated archivolt. The other ground floor bays contain round-arched doorways with keystones on corbels. In the upper floor are mullioned and transomed windows, and on the roof is a lantern with round-arched windows, a dentilled cornice, and a curved pyramidal roof with a weathervane.	II
Telephone kiosk 54.30508°N 1.06503°W		1935	The K6 type telephone kiosk outside St Mary Magdalene's Church was designed by Giles Gilbert Scott. Constructed in cast iron with a square plan and a dome, it has three unperforated crowns in the top panels.	II
Ha-ha wall, Duncombe Park; 54.24020°N 1.07372°W	—	Undated	The ha-ha wall in the grounds of the house is in sandstone, and consists of four to five rusticated courses with capstones. It curves, and runs from the northern stable block to the Ionic temple.	II*
