= Sproxton =

Sproxton could be

- Sproxton, Leicestershire
- Sproxton, North Yorkshire
- David Sproxton, animator
