= St Chad's Church, Sproxton =

Church in Sproxton, North Yorkshire, England

Coordinates: 54°13′35″N 1°03′36″W

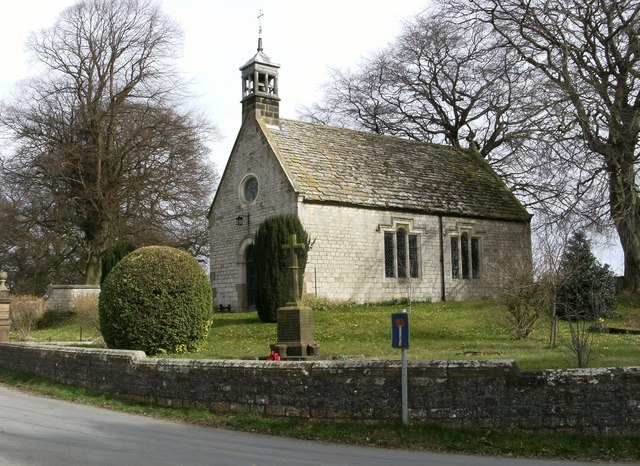
The church, in 2009

St Chad's Church is an Anglican church in Sproxton, North Yorkshire, a village in England.

Sproxton was long in the parish of All Saints' Church, Helmsley. A chapel was built at West Newton Grange in Oswaldkirk, perhaps in the 1640s. By the 1870s it was being used as a barn, and William Duncombe, Viscount Helmsley gave the building to Charles Gray, Vicar of Helmsley. He had it taken down and re-erected to provide a chapel of ease in Sproxton. The work was supervised by George Gilbert Scott Jr. and Temple Moore. Some sources describe it as the smallest church in North Yorkshire, with just nine pews. The building was grade II listed in 1955, along with its gate and gateposts.

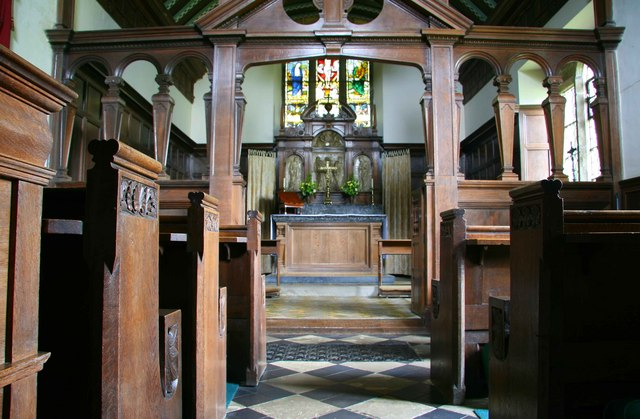
View from the nave into the chancel

The church is built of limestone with a stone slate roof, and consists of a nave and a chancel in one unit. On the west gable is a wooden bellcote with a pyramidal lead roof. The doorway has a round-arched head, a fanlight, imposts and a hood mould, and above it is an oval window. At the entrance to the churchyard are wrought iron gates, and sandstone gate posts, each with scroll moulding and a double entablature with a moulded cornice and a ball finial. The north window of the nave contains some 15th-century glass. Inside, there is a reredos with a triptych in plaster, and at the west end a 19th-century screen with a tiny gallery above. The gateposts outside are 19th-century work, while the wrought iron gate is 20th century.

== See also ==
- Listed buildings in Sproxton, North Yorkshire
