= Listed buildings in Sproxton, North Yorkshire =

Sproxton is a civil parish in the county of North Yorkshire, England. It contains nine listed buildings that are recorded in the National Heritage List for England. All the listed buildings are designated at Grade II, the lowest of the three grades, which is applied to "buildings of national importance and special interest". The parish contains the village of Sproxton and the surrounding countryside. The listed buildings consist of houses, a church, a farmhouse and barn, a triumphal arch and an associated lodge, and two mileposts.

== Buildings ==
Name and location	Photograph	Date	Notes
St Chad's Church, gate and gateposts 54.22642°N 1.05991°W		Late 16th to early 17th century	The church was re-erected in 1879 by George Gilbert Scott junior and Temple Moore. It is built in limestone with a stone slate roof, and consists of a nave and a chancel in one unit. On the west gable is a wooden bellcote with a pyramidal lead roof. The doorway has a round-arched head, a fanlight, imposts and a hood mould, and above it is an oval window. At the entrance to the churchyard are wrought iron gates, and sandstone gate posts, each with scroll moulding and a double entablature with a moulded cornice and a ball finial.
Forge Cottage; 54.22615°N 1.05482°W	—	17th century	The house is in whitewashed stone with a thatched roof. There is one storey and an attic, and three bays. On the front is a stable door, with two casement windows to its left and a horizontally sliding sash window to the right. In the attic are dormers with casements.
Aspin Farmhouse; 54.22584°N 1.06030°W		Mid-18th century	The house has a cruck framed core, the walls are in limestone, and it has a swept pantile roof with gable copings and shaped kneelers. There are two storeys and four bays. On the front is a doorway, and the windows are a mix of casements and horizontally sliding sashes. Inside, there are two pairs of crucks.
Low Parks Farmhouse and Barn; 54.22615°N 1.05482°W		Late 18th century	The farmhouse is in limestone and has a swept pantile roof with gable copings and shaped kneelers. There are two storeys and three bays. On the front is a wooden porch flanked by French doors, and the windows are casements. The barn to the left has doorways and windows, and stone steps on the left gable end lead up to the granary.
Sproxton Hall; 54.22528°N 1.05117°W		Late 18th century	A house that was later extended, it is in sandstone and limestone, with roofs of pantile and Welsh slate with gable coping, and two storeys. The left part has two bays, and contains a blocked doorway and casement windows. The right part has two storeys, a doorway and casement windows.
Nelson Gate; 54.22791°N 1.06070°W		1806	A triumphal arch forming a gateway at the entrance to the grounds of Duncombe Park from the A170 road. It consists of a round-headed arch with Tuscan columns, imposts, a moulded cornice, and a dated keystone. On the arch are inscriptions commemorating the achievements of Lord Nelson.
Nelson Gate Lodge; 54.22810°N 1.06043°W	—	Mid-19th century	The lodge at the entrance to the grounds of Duncombe Park from the A170 road is in sandstone with a hipped Westmorland slate roof. There is a single story, and a square plan with a rear outshut. The doorway has a divided fanlight, and the windows are casements with hood moulds.
Milepost west of Sproxton; 54.22795°N 1.07454°W		Late 19th century	The milepost is on the south side of Cote Lane (A170 road). It is in cast iron, and has a triangular plan and a sloping top. On the top is inscribed "NRYCC", on the left side is the distance to Thirsk, and on the right side the distance to Helmsley.
Milepost north of Sproxton; 54.23134°N 1.05900°W		Late 19th century	The milepost is on the east side of the A170 road. It is in cast iron, and has a triangular plan and a sloping top. On both faces are pointing hands, the left face has the distance to Malton, and on the right face is the distance to Helmsley.
