= Helmsley Bridge =

Bridge in Helmsley, England

Coordinates: 54°14′39″N 1°03′33″W

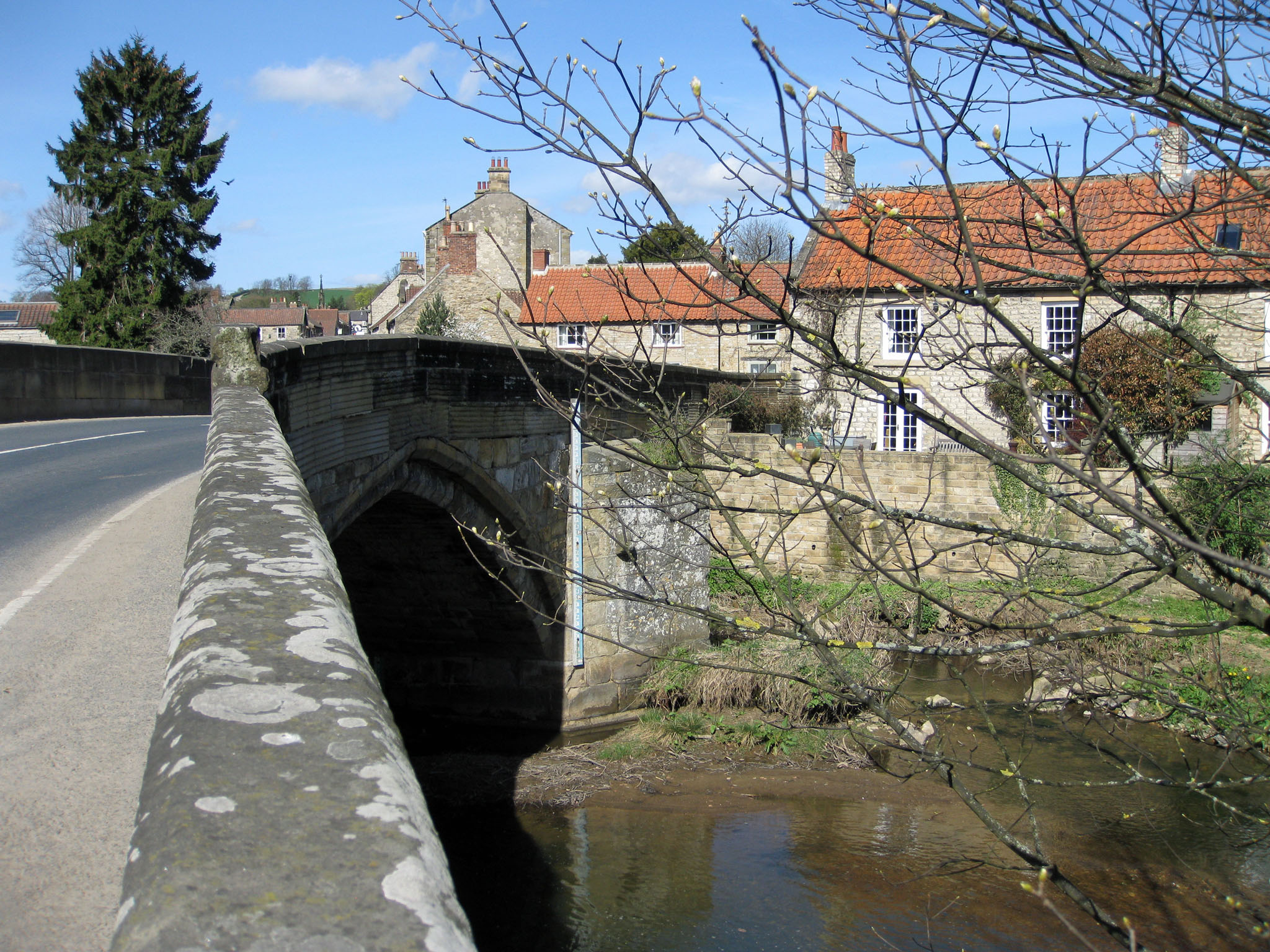
The bridge, in 2011

Helmsley Bridge, sometimes known as Rye Bridge, is a historic bridge in Helmsley, a town in North Yorkshire, in England.

The bridge carries the A170 road over the River Rye, just below the mouth of the Borough Beck. It was constructed in the Mediaeval period, perhaps in the 14th century, and probably for Rievaulx Abbey. It is the oldest surviving bridge over the Rye, but was largely rebuilt in the late 18th century. The parapet may have been rebuilt, and it was repaired in 2023. It is a scheduled monument and has been a grade II listed building since 1955.

The bridge is built of sandstone and has two arches, one 37 feet (11 m) wide and the other only 23 feet (7.0 m) wide. Each has double arch rings, and they have buttresses between them. The bridge was originally about 12 feet (3.7 m) across, with pointed arches, but was later widened upstream, with round arches, to a total breadth of 20 feet (6.1 m). The bridge has a band, a parapet and coping.

== See also ==
- Listed buildings in Helmsley
