= Helmsley Market Cross =

Market cross in Helmsley, North Yorkshire, England

Coordinates: 54°14′47″N 1°03′42″W

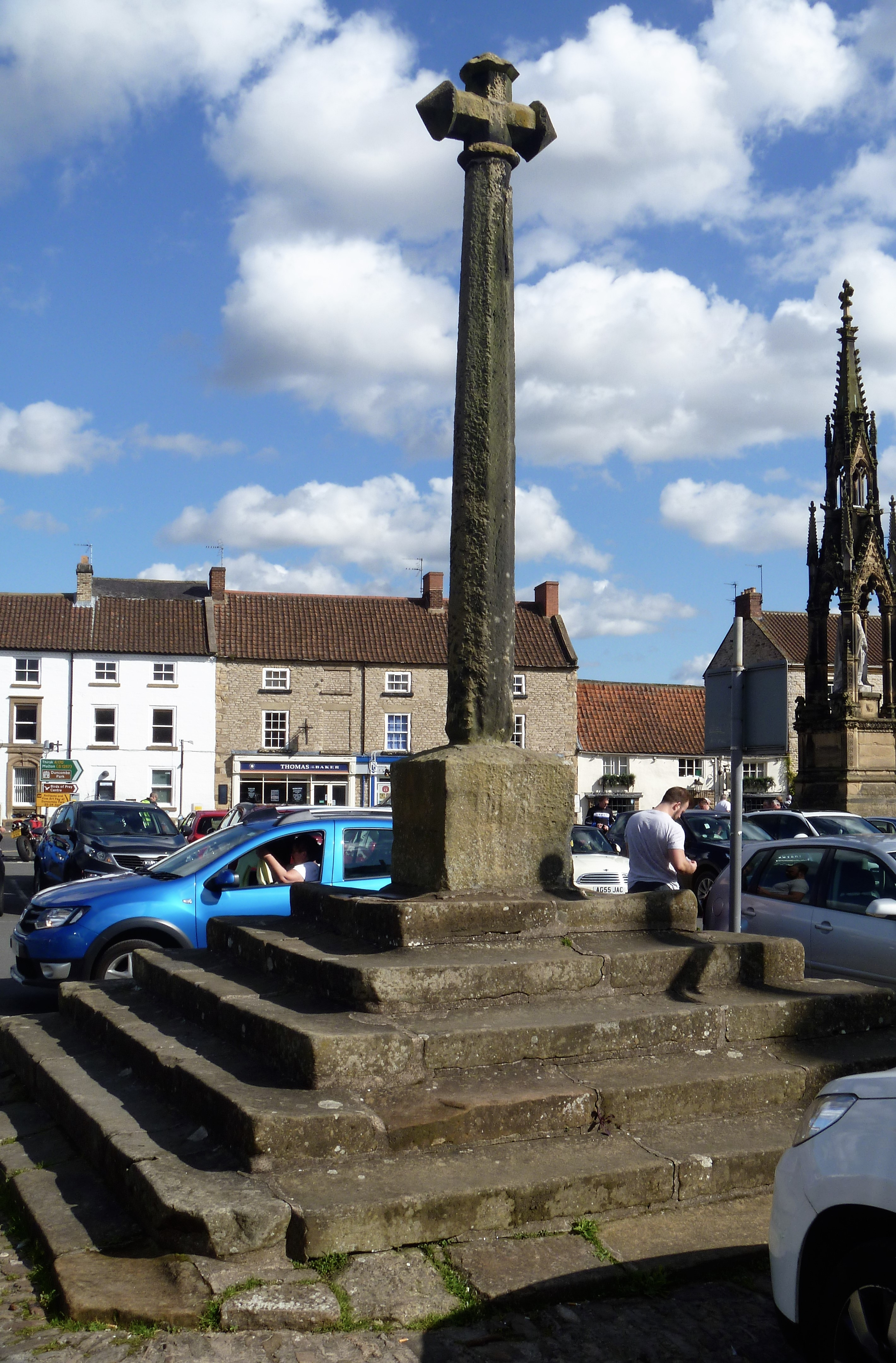
The cross, in 2017

Helmsley Market Cross is a historic structure in Helmsley, a town in North Yorkshire, in England.

Helmsley was granted a borough charter in 1191, which gave it permission to host a weekly market. A local tradition states that a market cross was first erected in the churchyard of All Saints' Church, but if the market did start there, it soon flowed into what is now the marketplace, and the cross now stands in the middle of that square. The square continues to host a weekly market, and for the remainder of the week is used as a car park. The cross was grade II listed in 1955.

The market cross is built of sandstone. It consists of an octagonal shaft with a cross on a square pedestal with six steps. The head of the cross was replaced in the 19th century.

== See also ==
- Listed buildings in Helmsley
