= Crown Inn, Helmsley =

Pub in Helmsley, North Yorkshire, England

Coordinates: 54°14′48″N 1°03′40″W

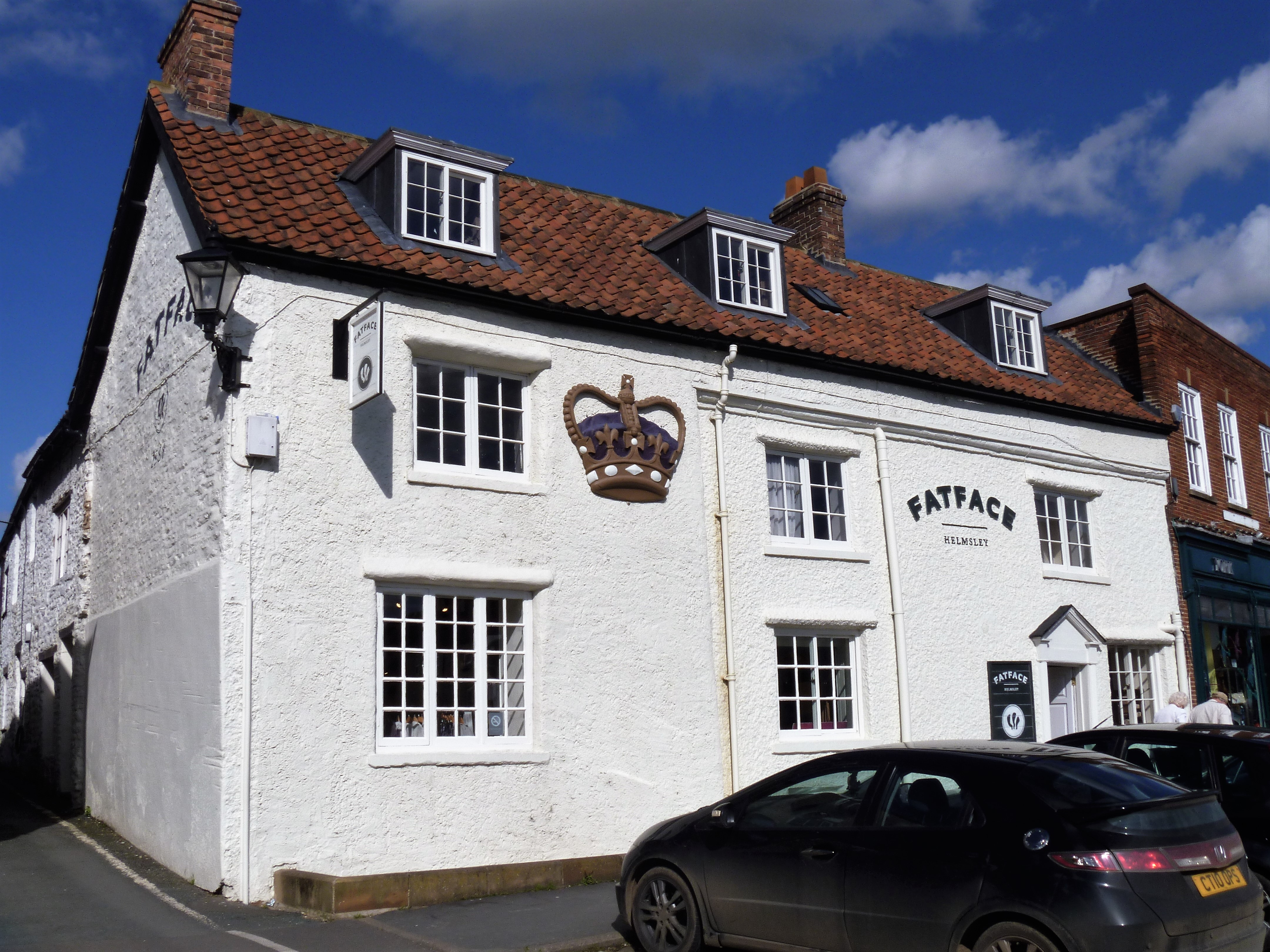
The building, in 2017

The Crown Inn is a historic building in Helmsley, a town in North Yorkshire, in England.

The building was probably constructed in two stages in the mid 17th century, and was used as a public house from the start. It was first recorded as the Crown Inn in the early 18th century, owned by the Sandwith family. In 1742, they sold the freehold to Thomas Duncombe. Part of the building was then demolished, and in the 20th century it was refurbished in an ahistoric style, but these changes were reversed in the early 21st century. The building was grade II listed in 1985. In 2016, it was converted into a shop, operated by FatFace.

The building is constructed of whitewashed rendered limestone with partial moulding below the eaves, and a pantile roof. It has two storeys and an attic, three bays, the left bay projecting slightly. The doorway to the right has fluted pilasters and an open pediment. The windows are a mix of casements and horizontally-sliding sashes and in the attic are three dormers. Inside are several original 17th century doors, which are elaborately carved.

== See also ==
- Listed buildings in Helmsley
