= Thomas the Baker =

British bakery chain

Thomas the Baker is a British bakery retail chain with 28 outlets. Based in Helmsley in North Yorkshire, it has branches across Yorkshire and Teesside. As well as bread, pies, pasties and sausage rolls, the chain is perhaps best known for its Yorkshire curd tart.

The business was established by John Thomas in Malton, North Yorkshire, in 1981. The Helmsley shop was opened in 1982. It remains a family business. Around two thirds of the raw materials are sourced from Yorkshire.
