= The Black Swan, Helmsley =

Hotel in North Yorkshire, England

Coordinates: 54°14′48″N 1°03′42″W

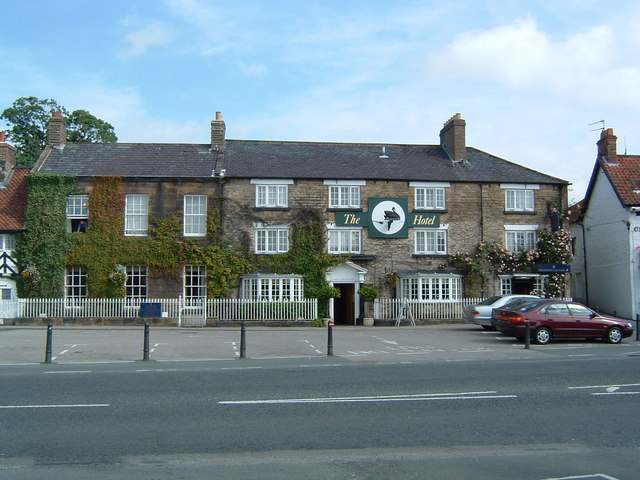
The building, in 2003

The Black Swan is a historic hotel in Helmsley, a town in North Yorkshire, in England

The oldest part of the hotel is a timber-framed building of the late 16th century. It was a high-status, two-storey house facing the town's market place, with a parlour wing extending back from the left gable. An early 18th-century house was built to its right, and then in the early 19th-century, a third house was built between the two. It was operating as a coaching inn by the early 19th century, and is often thought to be the Helmsley Inn praised enthusiastically by Dorothy Wordsworth in her journal. The building was grade II listed in 1955. In 2021, the hotel was refurbished by its owners, The Inn Collection Group, and celebrated the reopening by installing a temporary ice rink. In 2023, it temporarily served as the town's post office, after the convenience store previously hosting it unexpectedly closed.

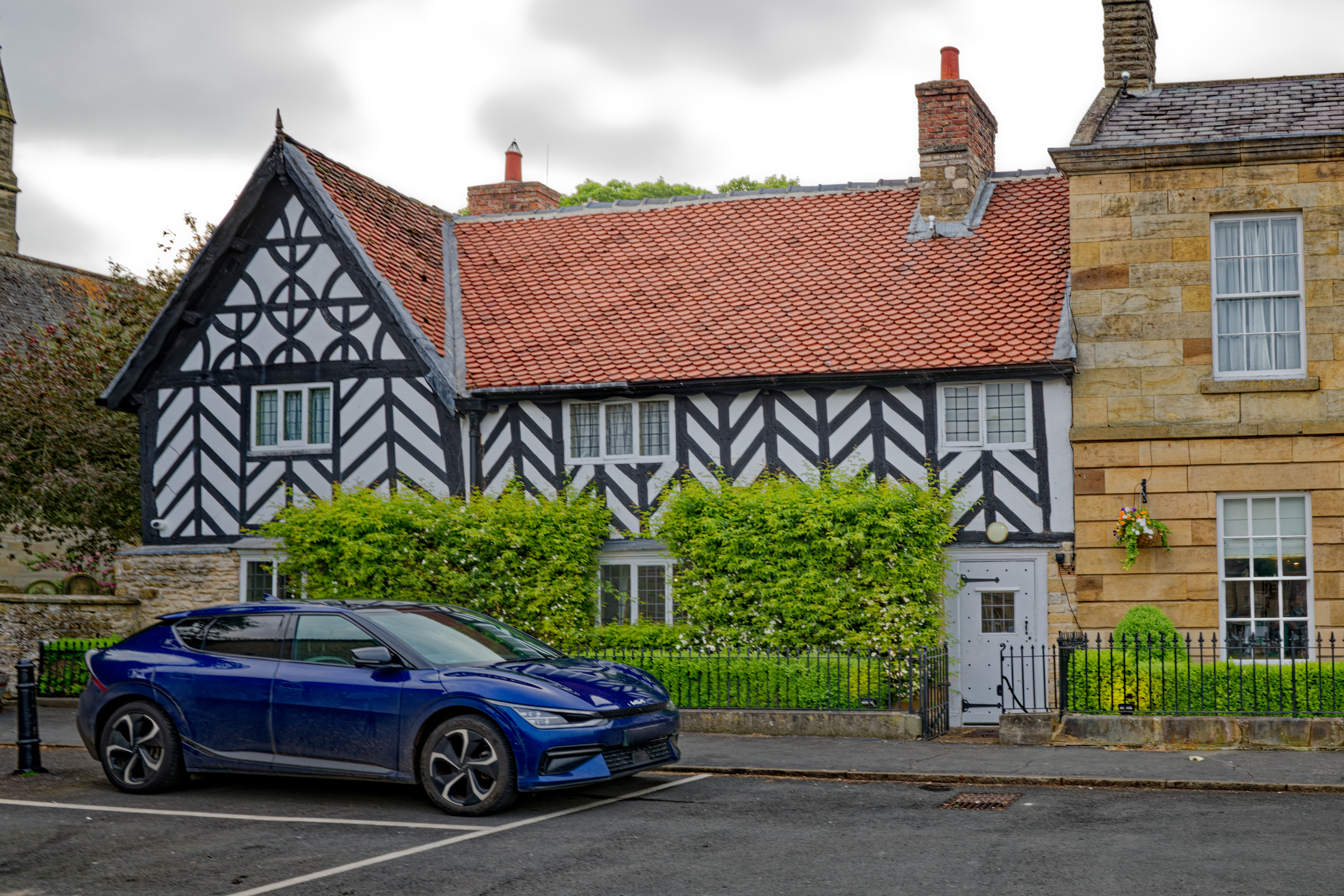
The Elizabethan section, seen in 2024

The earliest part of the hotel is timber framed and underbuilt with sandstone, and it has a tile roof. It has two storeys, a two-bay hall range, and a gabled cross wing on the left. It contains a doorway and casement windows. To the right is the 19th-century section, which is in rusticated sandstone with a Welsh slate roof. There are two storeys and three bays, and it contains sash windows. Further to the right is the 18th-century part which is in sandstone with a Welsh slate roof, three storeys and four bays. The doorway has engaged Tuscan columns, a blocked fanlight and an open pediment. In the ground floor are canted bay windows, and the upper floors contain casement windows, those in the middle floor with wedge lintels. In front of the whole of the hotel are plain wrought iron railings. The interior is largely altered, but the 16th-century hall retains visible beams including a massive bressumer.

== See also ==
- Listed buildings in Helmsley
