= Ample Bosom =

British clothing retailer

- Company type: Private
- Industry: Clothing
- Founded: 1999; 27 years ago
- Founder: Sally Robinson
- Headquarters: Helmsley, North Yorkshire, United Kingdom
- Products: Bras; swimsuits; nightwear; lingerie; plus-size clothing
- Services: Online retail; mail order
- Number of employees: 6
- Website: www.amplebosom.com

Ample Bosom is a UK-based online and mail-order bra, lingerie, swimwear, nightwear and clothing retailer founded in 1999 by Sally Robinson, based on a family run farm in Old Byland, North Yorkshire. AmpleBosom.com was featured on the BBC series Inside Dot Coms in 2000.

== Location ==
Ample Bosom is based in converted barns at Valley View Farm, Old Byland, Helmsley, North Yorkshire.

== Products ==
Ample Bosom products include bras, lingerie, swimwear, nightwear, and clothing for women and menswear briefs. The bra-sized products range from 28 to 58 AA-N cups, and the company specialises in plus sizes.
