= St Mary's Church, Helmsley =

Church in Helmsley, North Yorkshire, England

Coordinates: 54°14′55″N 1°03′55″W

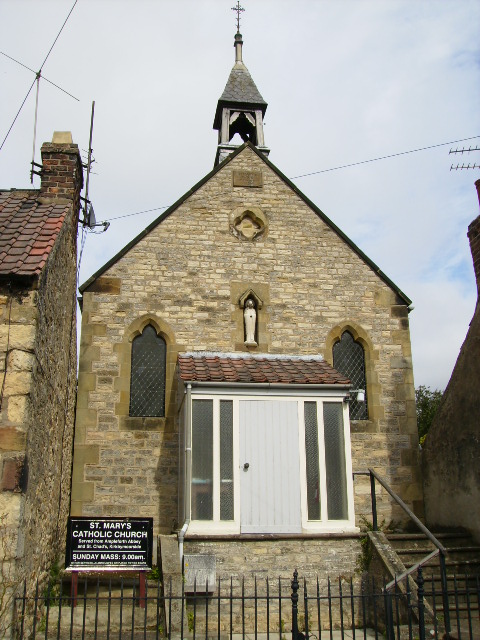
The church, in 2007

St Mary's Church is a Catholic church in Helmsley, a town in North Yorkshire, in England.

The church was founded by Austin Bateman as a daughter church of Ampleforth Abbey. The Gothic Revival building may have been designed by Bernard Smith, and it was completed in 1894. In the 1960s, it was moved into the parish of Our Lady and St Chad's Church, Kirkbymoorside.

The church is built of local stone, with a timber and glass porch, and a pantile roof. The gabled front is set back behind the lines of the neighbouring cottages and is up two flights of steps. Trefoil window flank the porch, while above it there is a niche with a statue, a quatrefoil and a datestone. Atop the gable is a bellcote with a pyramidal roof. The east end has a Decorated Gothic window. Inside, there is a single space with white walls, and eight Stations of the Cross, carved in 1980 by Rosamund Fletcher and installed in 1990. There is also a small sacristry accessed from the sanctuary.
