= Canons Garth =

Building in Helmsley, North Yorkshire, England

Coordinates: 54°14′50″N 1°03′43″W

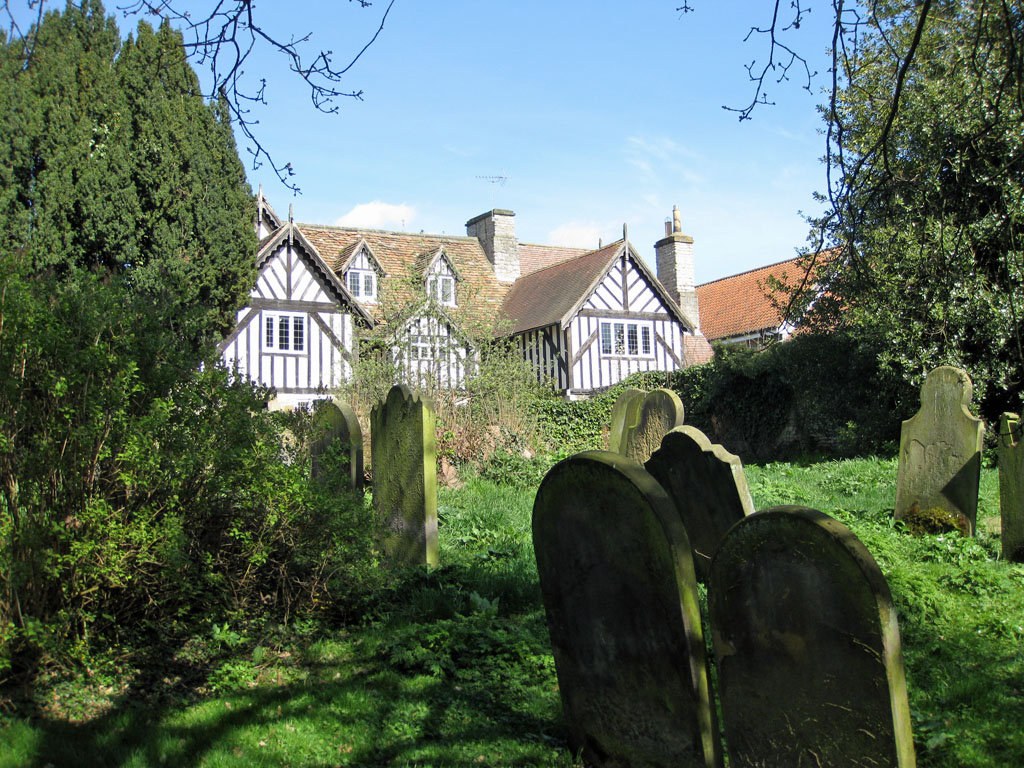
The building, in 2011

Canons Garth is a historic building in Helmsley, a town in North Yorkshire, in England.

The house was built in the late 14th century as a hall house with a cross passage and a rear aisle. It was possibly built for the canons of Kirkham Abbey. In the 17th century, a wing was added to the left, the cross passage removed and a central porch entrance created. Alterations by Temple Moore in 1889 included the creation of a chapel and study, and the replacement of all the windows. The house was restored in 1975, when the porch was rebuilt.

In the early 20th century, the house served as a retreat for the Society of All Saints Sisters of the Poor. In about 1970, it became the parsonage for All Saints' Church, Helmsley, but it was sold off in 2011. The house has been grade II* listed since 1955.

The ground floor of the house is in sandstone, the upper parts are timber framed, and the roof is tiled. It has two storeys and attics, and the house consists of a main range and projecting cross-wings, all gabled. The windows are casements, and in the attic are gabled dormers. In front, there is a doorway and walls. Inside, the hall has a fireplace, and the passage has what may be a built-in salt box. The chapel has Mediaeval floor tiles, brought from Rievaulx Abbey, while the study has a 16th-century fireplace, brought from Helmsley Castle. The roof structure is original; it includes a base cruck, something found elsewhere in northern England only at Baxby Manor; and it is topped by a tall, square, crown post structure.

== See also ==
- Grade II* listed buildings in North Yorkshire (district)
- Listed buildings in Helmsley
