= Sproxton, North Yorkshire =

Village and civil parish in North Yorkshire, England

Coordinates: 54°13′34″N 1°03′28″W

Sproxton
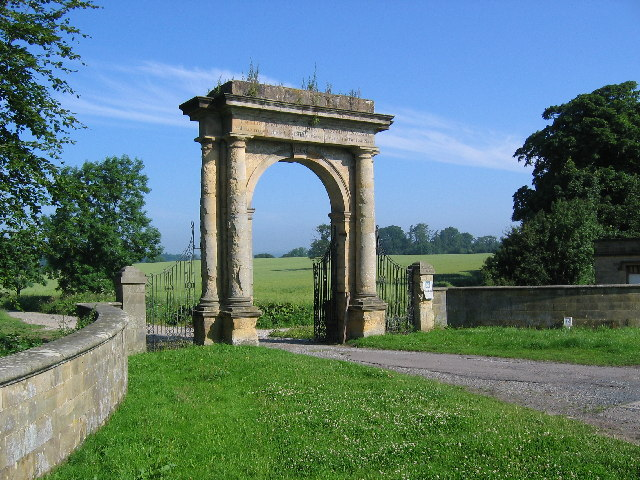
- The Nelson Gate near Sproxton, built in 1806, a monument to Admiral Nelson

- Location within North Yorkshire
- Population: 219 (Including Rievaulx. 2011)
- OS grid reference: SE615815
- Civil parish: Sproxton
- Unitary authority: North Yorkshire
- Ceremonial county: North Yorkshire
- Region: Yorkshire and the Humber
- Country: England
- Sovereign state: United Kingdom
- Post town: York
- Postcode district: YO62
- Police: North Yorkshire
- Fire: North Yorkshire
- Ambulance: Yorkshire
- UK Parliament: Thirsk and Malton

Sproxton is a village and civil parish in North Yorkshire, England. It is 1.2 miles (2 km) south of Helmsley and on the junction between the A170 road and the B1257 road on the edge of the North York Moors National Park. The village was founded by the Banks family who originated from the Barlow family who designed the original wooden Nelson Gates. The 1806 stone version serves as the southern entrance/exit to Duncombe Park. The Grade II listed structure is inscribed with "To the memory of Lord Viscount Nelson and the unparalleled gallant achievements of the British Navy" on the front and on the rear side is inscribed with "Lamented Hero! O price his conquering country grieved to pays o dear brought glories of Trafalgar Day!"

In the time of Edward the Confessor, Sproxton (Sprostune) was in the hands of three local noblemen, but by 1086 the land belonged to the crown. The name Sproxton itself derives from Sprok's farm or settlement with Sprok being the farm owner's given name.

St Chad's Church, Sproxton is grade II listed, and is unusual in that it was originally built in the 17th century as the chapel of West Newton Grange and moved to the village brick by brick in 1879. It is also reputedly the smallest in North Yorkshire (in terms of attendance) as it has only nine pews.

The 43 ha (110 acres) wood at the eastern edge of the village was bought by the Woodland Trust in 2008, having previously been part of the Duncombe Park estate. In the 12th and 13th centuries, the wood was part of the deer park in the Helmsley area. The Woodland Trust refers to the site as Robson's Spring, but is it actually three woods named Ness Great Wood, Green Sykes and Robson's Spring.

Sproxton lies within the Kirkbymoorside electoral division of North Yorkshire Council. It was part of the Ryedale district from 1974 to 2023. For Westminster elections Sproxton comes under the Thirsk and Malton constituency, currently represented by Kevin Hollinrake, a Conservative who has been incumbent since May 2015.

== See also ==
- Listed buildings in Sproxton, North Yorkshire
