= Helmsley Town Hall =

Municipal building in Helmsley, North Yorkshire, England

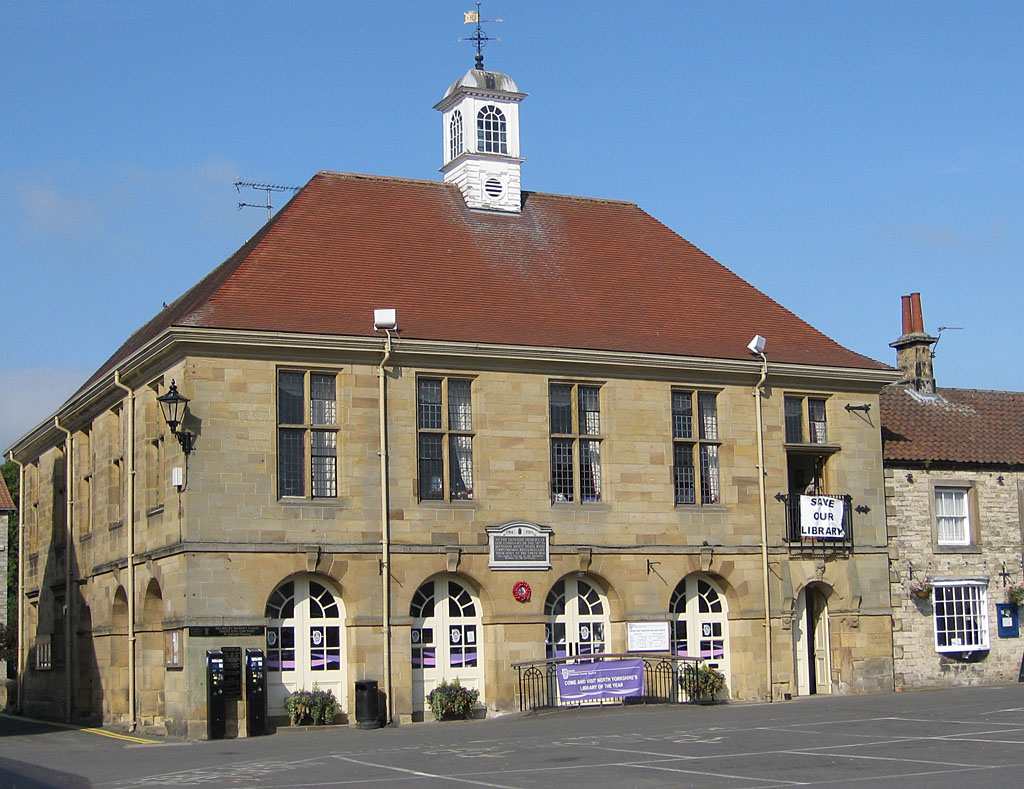
- Helmsley Town Hall

- Shown in North Yorkshire
- 54.2461°N 1.0619°W
- Location: Market Place, Helmsley

History
- Built: 1901

Site notes
- Architect: Temple Moore
- Architectural style: Queen Anne style

Listed Building – Grade II
- Official name: Town Hall
- Designated: 18 March 1985
- Reference no.: 1308328

Helmsley Town Hall is a municipal building in the Market Place in Helmsley, North Yorkshire, England. The structure, which is used as a community library and a community events centre, is a grade II listed building.

== History ==
The first municipal building in Helmsley was a tollbooth in the Market Place; it was primarily used as a butchers' market and dated back at least to the mid-17th century. A school was established on the first floor in 1802 and it was remodelled as a courthouse, with the county court on the ground floor and provision for petty session hearings on the first floor, in the mid-19th century. In the late 19th century, the lord of the manor, the 1st Earl of Feversham of Duncombe Park, decided to commission a more substantial town hall for Helmsley: the site he chose, on the west side of the Market Place, was occupied by a branch of the York and East Riding Bank.

The foundation stone for the new building was laid by the Duke of York on 20 June 1900. It was designed by Temple Moore in the Queen Anne style, built in ashlar stone and was completed in 1901. The design involved a nearly symmetrical main frontage with five bays facing onto the Market Place; the building was arcaded on the ground floor, to create a corn exchange, with an assembly room on the first floor. There were four wide openings to the corn exchange on the ground floor and, in the right-hand bay, a doorway with a rusticated archivolt which provided access to a staircase leading to the assembly room. There were four mullioned and transomed windows on the first floor and, in the right-hand bay, a French door with a wrought iron balcony. At roof level, there was a cornice and a central wooden lantern. The architectural historian, Nikolaus Pevsner, was critical of the design and described the structure as a "serious, rather dull job".

After the First World War, a plaque was installed on the front elevation of the building to commemorate the lives of local members of the 21st (Service) Battalion of the King's Royal Rifle Corps who had died in the war. In 1958, the then lord of the manor, the 3rd Earl of Feversham, gave the building to the local parish council.

The ground floor was subsequently converted for use as public library while the first floor continued to be used as a venue for community events. A tourist information centre was also established in the building, but this was closed in March 2014. The public library became a community library, managed by volunteers, in April 2017.
