= Church of All Saints, Helmsley =

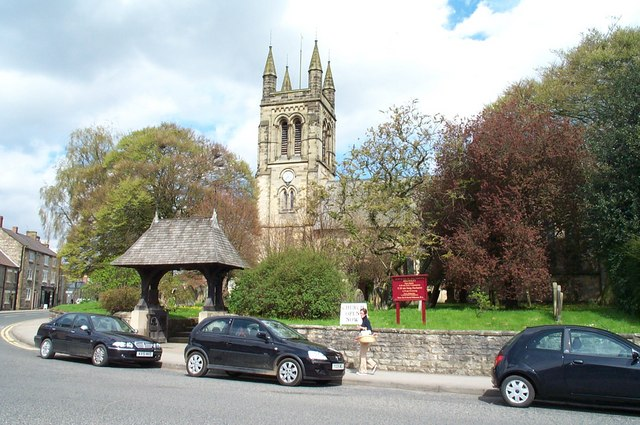
- The church, viewed from the south

- Location in Yorkshire
- 54.2469°N 1.0625°W
- OS grid reference: SE 620 789
- Location: Helmsley, North Yorkshire
- Country: England
- Denomination: Church of England
- Churchmanship: Central

History
- Status: Parish church
- Founded: 12th century
- Dedication: All Saints

Architecture
- Functional status: Active
- Heritage designation: Grade II*
- Designated: 4 January 1955
- Architectural type: Church

Administration
- Province: Province of York
- Diocese: Diocese of York
- Archdeaconry: Cleveland
- Deanery: Northern Ryedale
- Parish: Helmsley

Clergy
- Rector: The Revd Melanie Burnside

The Church of All Saints is an Anglican parish church serving the town of Helmsley in North Yorkshire, England. It is located between the north-west corner of the market square, and Castlegate, on the B1257 road north of Helmsley Castle. Dedicated to All Saints, it has been part of the Church of England since the Reformation. It is one of four churches in the same benefice: Sproxton, Rievaulx, and East Moors. The church was granted Grade II* listed building status on 4 January 1955.

== History ==
There has been a church in Helmsley since before the Norman conquest, and the churchyard was used as a market place in Anglo-Saxon times. Another measure of the church's antiquity is the hogback gravestone in the porch. A church was recorded in the Domesday Book in 1086.

An organ by Mr. Whitehead of York was installed in 1852–53. The opening service was on 27 January 1853 when the choir of York Minster were in attendance.

There was much rebuilding in the 19th century, between 1866 and 1869 funded by the Earl of Feversham by the architects Banks and Barry and the contractors Barton and Smith of Helmsley, at a cost of £16,000 (equivalent to £1,650,000 in 2025). Many changes were made in the rebuilding, and Norman and later features were lost, including the font, which was replaced in 1868; the original medieval font is now in the church at Pockley. However, the church gained some fine stained glass by Hardman & Co. of Birmingham.

In 1931 a Harrison & Harrison pipe organ was installed on a platform immediately west of the chancel. This organ replaced an existing instrument installed in 1868 by the Walker organ company. Mr Arthur Harrison retained some of the existing pipework and incorporated this in the new instrument. The Harrison & Harrison organ, which is located above and behind the pulpit, is used in current worship.

== Architecture ==
In the 12th century the church was built in the Norman style and two arches, one over the entrance doorway, the other over the chancel, remain in place. They are rounded arches in the Norman style, as opposed to the Early English in which pointed arches were used in later developments. The church has a three-stage west tower, a four-bay nave, a two-bay chancel, transepts, vestry and south porch. Its 19th-century restoration was in the Gothic Revival style but incorporates work from the old church. It is constructed of sandstone ashlar with a steeply sloping stone slate roof. The tower has 13th-century lancet windows to its west and north faces at the second stage. Its other lancet windows, round-headed belfry windows and octagonal turrets date from the 19th-century restoration. The south porch is entered by a round arch accessing a 12th-century doorway. Windows installed in the 19th century in the north aisle and at the west end have reticulated tracery. The chancel has round-headed and lancet windows.

Photographs reveal that the roof was altered in the restoration of 1866–69 and the church had a parapet with battlements on the southern side.

The north chapel is dedicated to Aelred, third abbot of the Cistercian monastery at Rievaulx Abbey. It contains a statue of the Virgin Mary, and votive candles. The south chapel is dedicated to Columba, a missionary from Ireland who brought Christianity to much of northern England. The chapel contains wall paintings of contemporary events, including depictions of Saint Oswald and a knight slaying a dragon emblazoned with the pagan gods.

The church was granted Grade II* listed building status on 4 January 1955.

== Modern usage ==
There is a congregation of around 70 people.

== See also ==
- Grade II* listed churches in North Yorkshire (district)
- Listed buildings in Helmsley

== Gallery ==
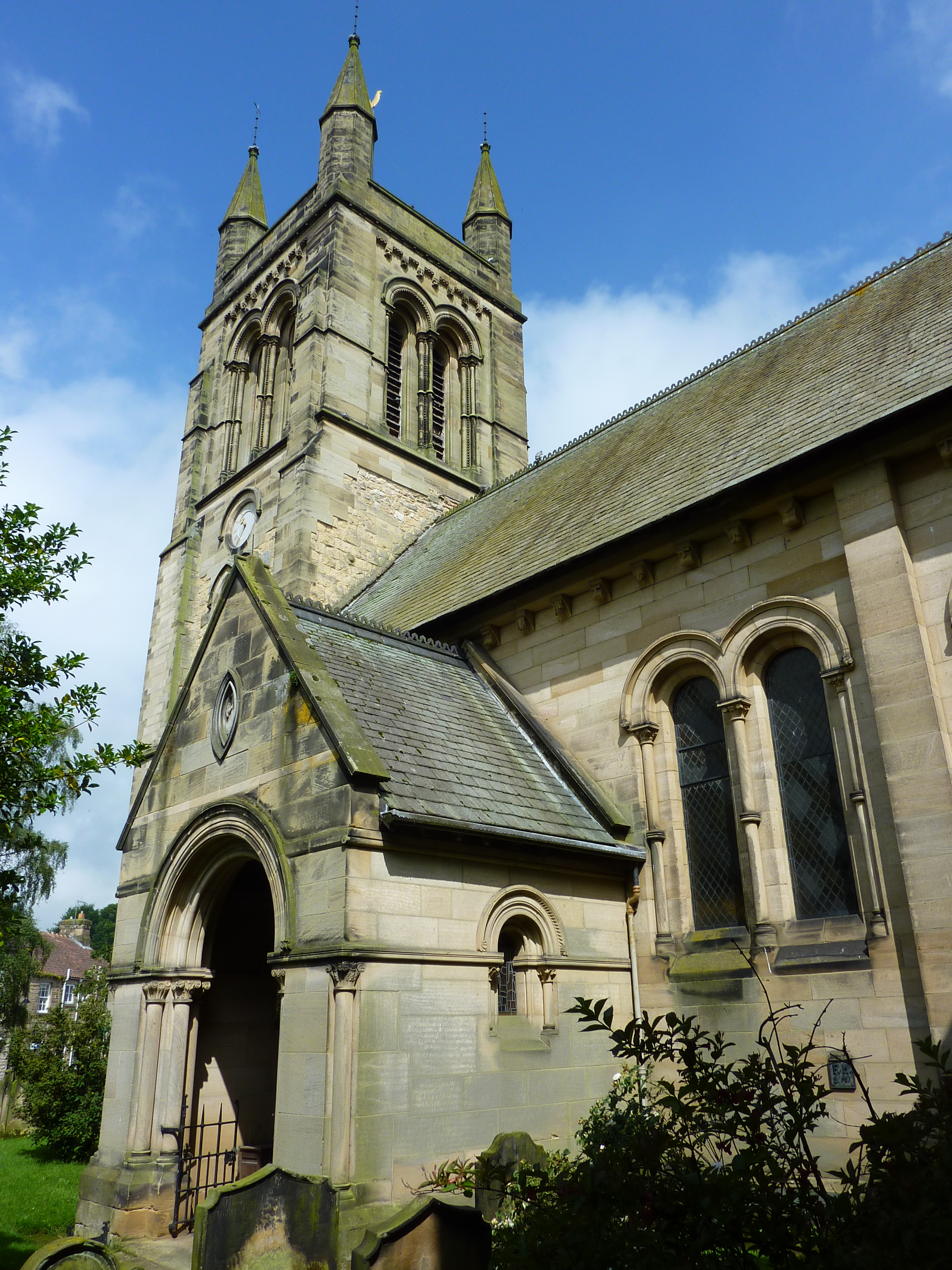
Entrance porch and tower

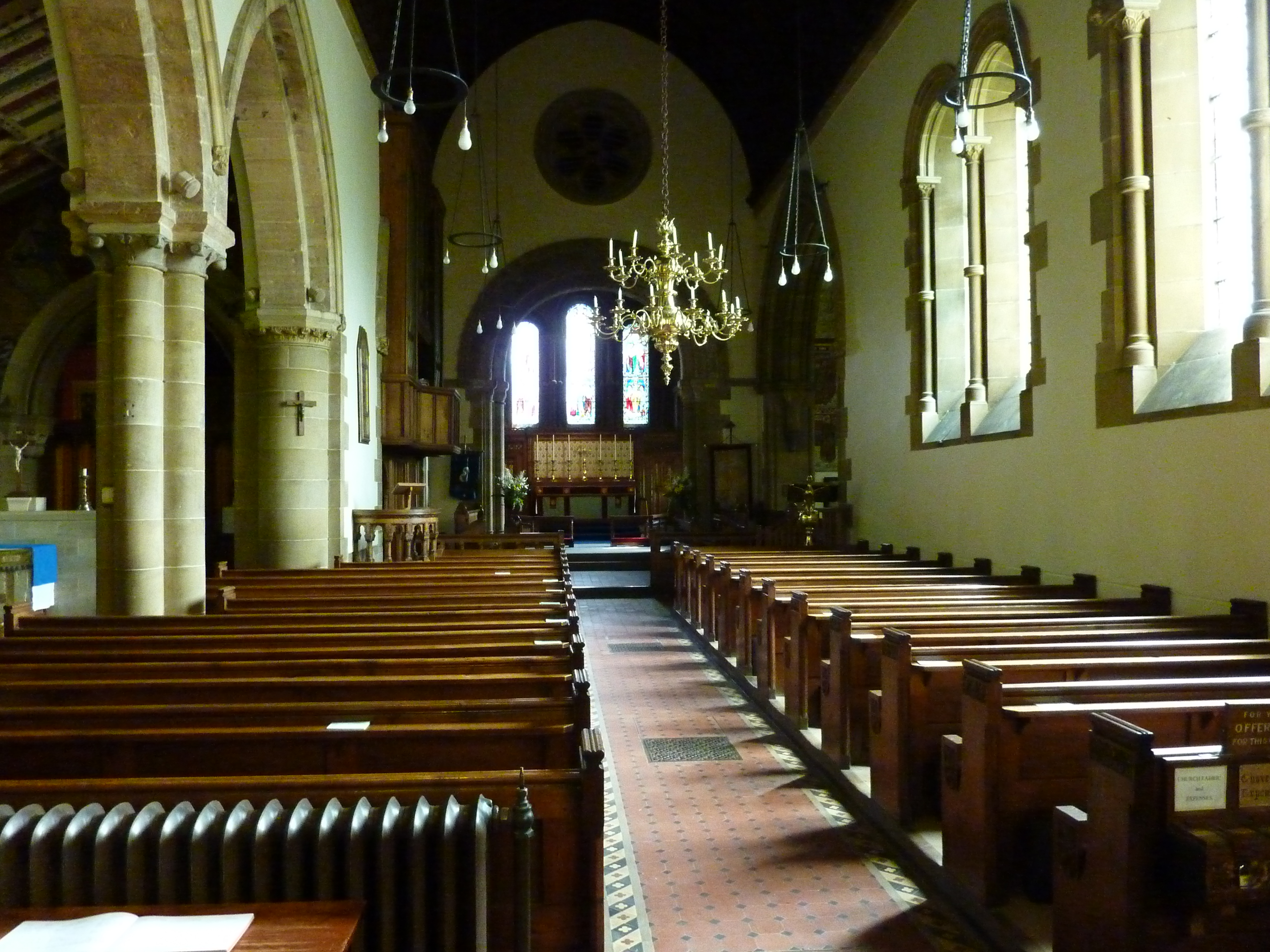
Nave

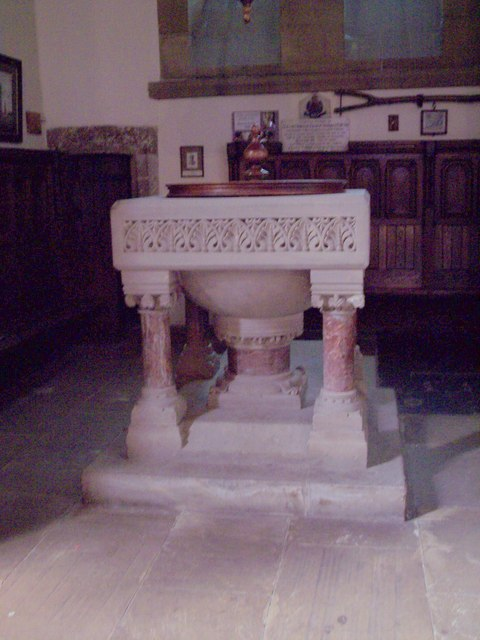
Font

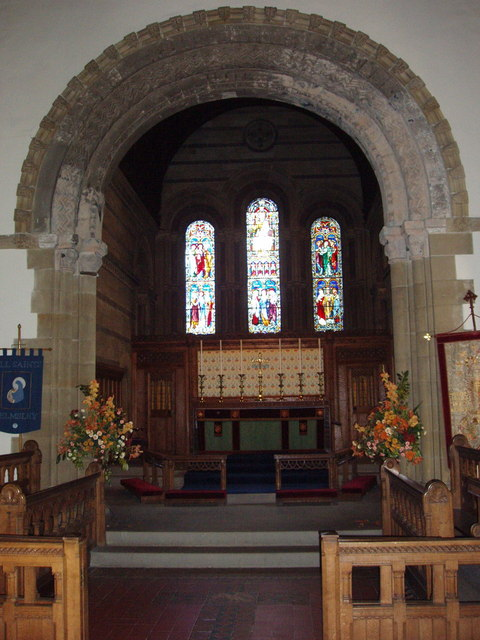
Chancel and sanctuary
