= Helmsley =

Market town in North Yorkshire, England

Coordinates: 54°14′50″N 1°03′31″W

- Town
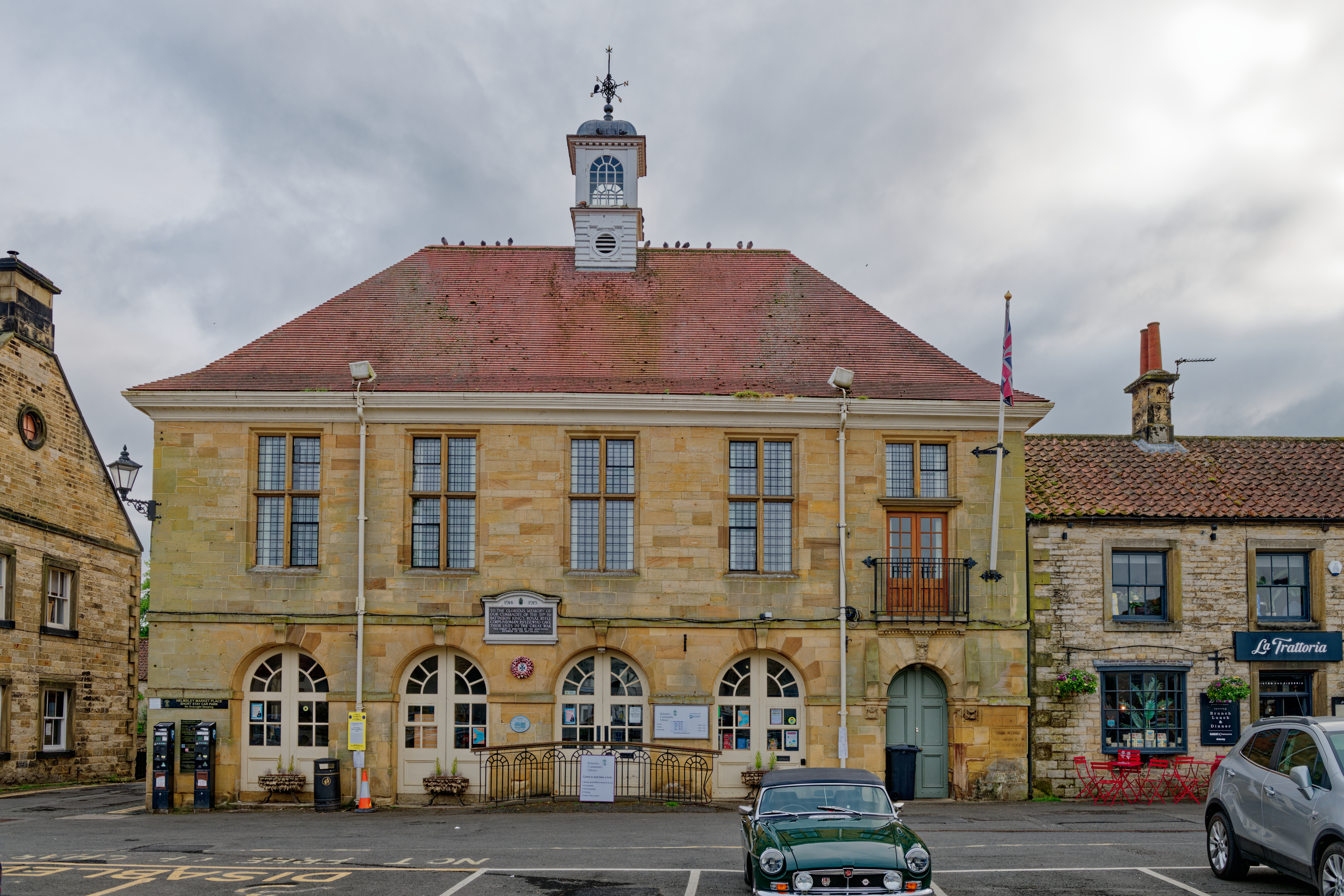
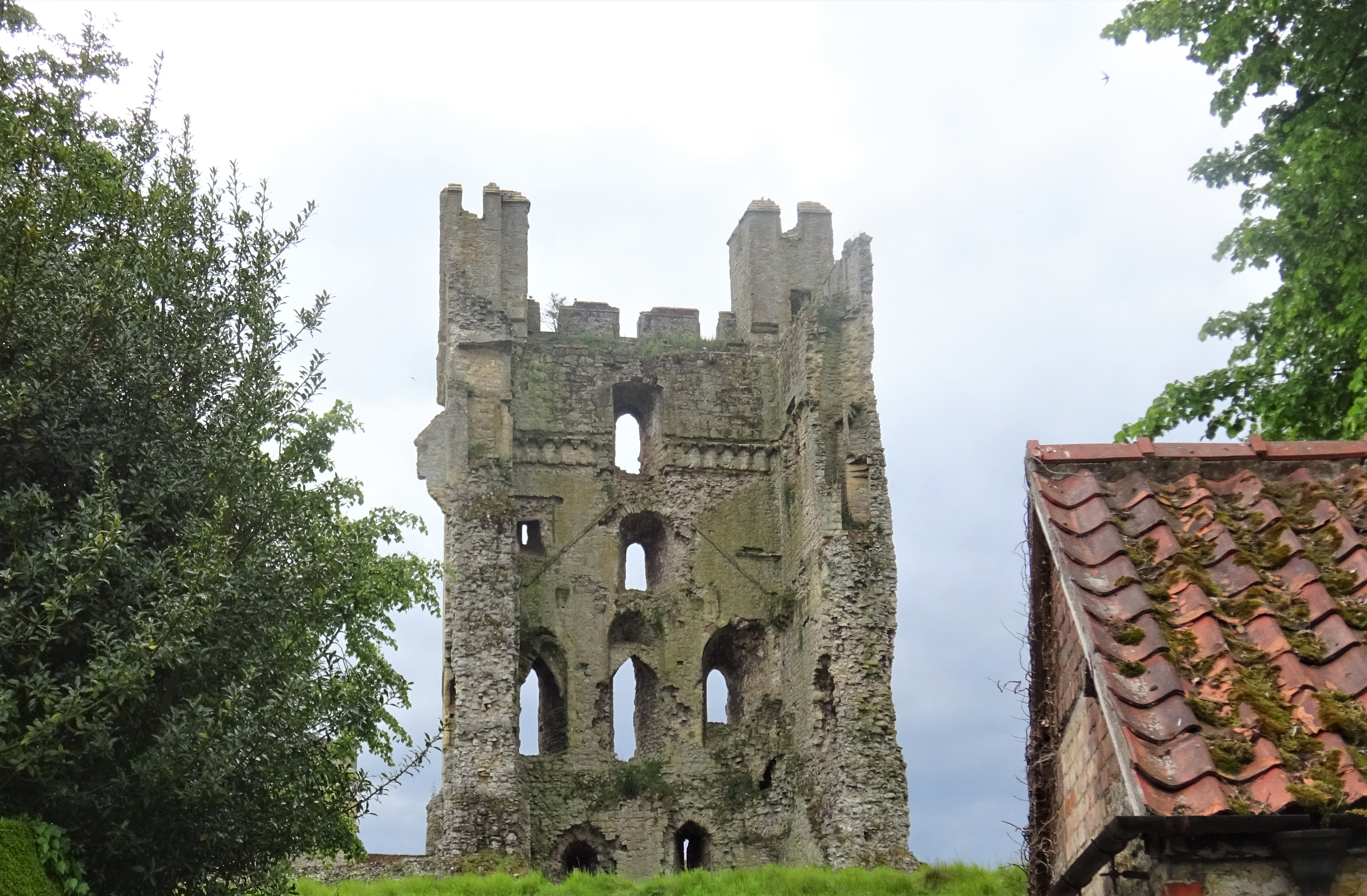
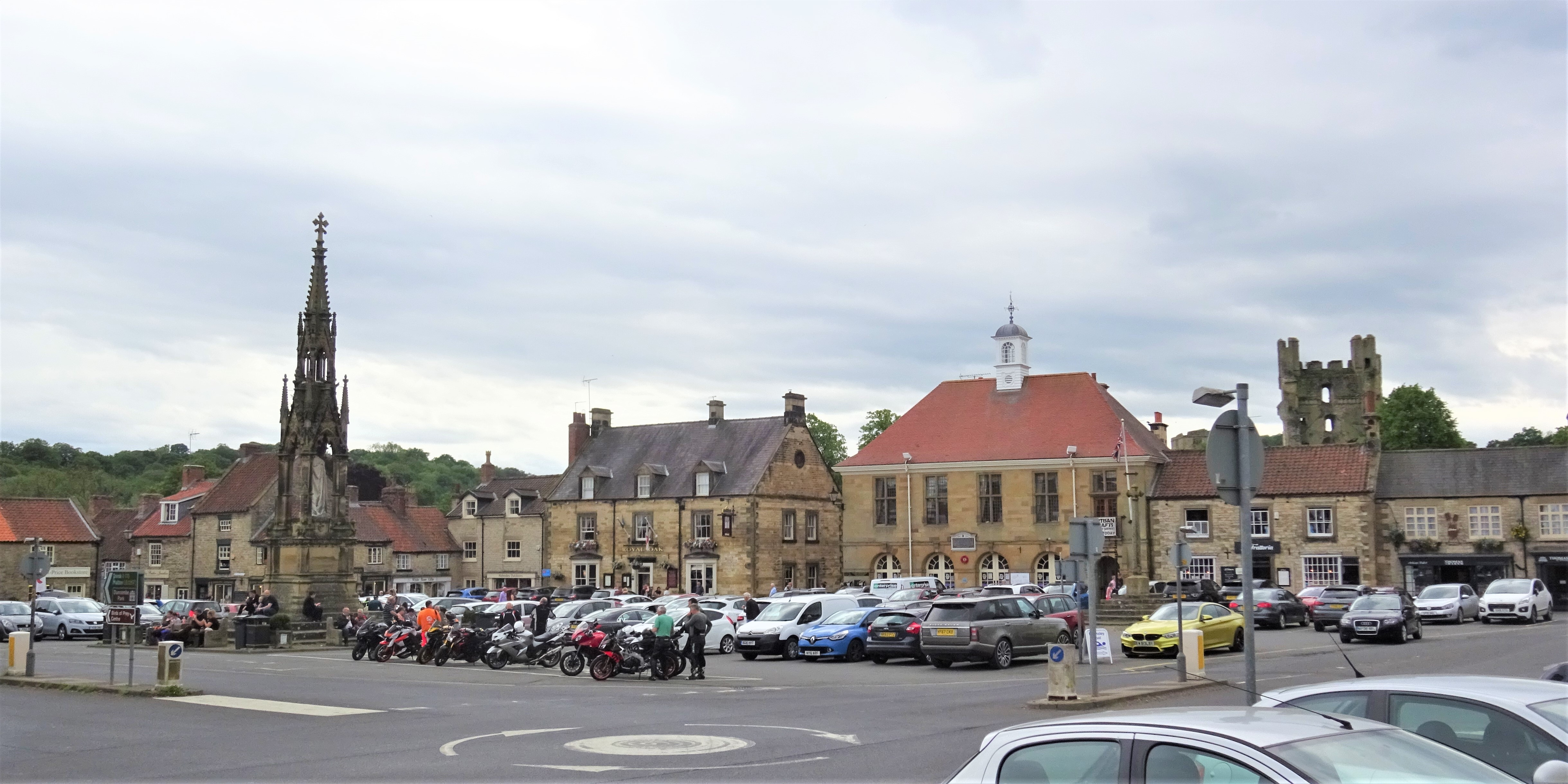
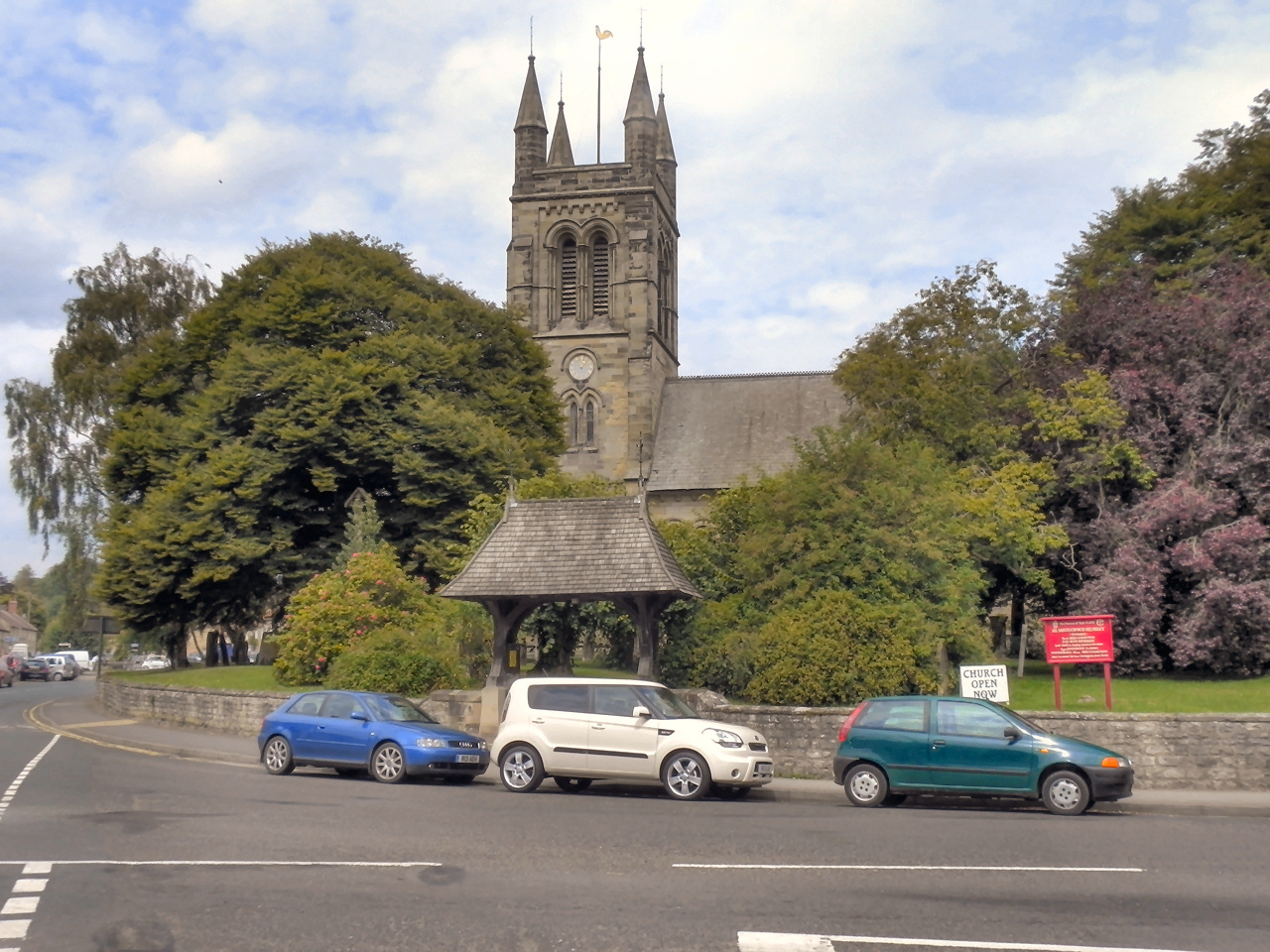
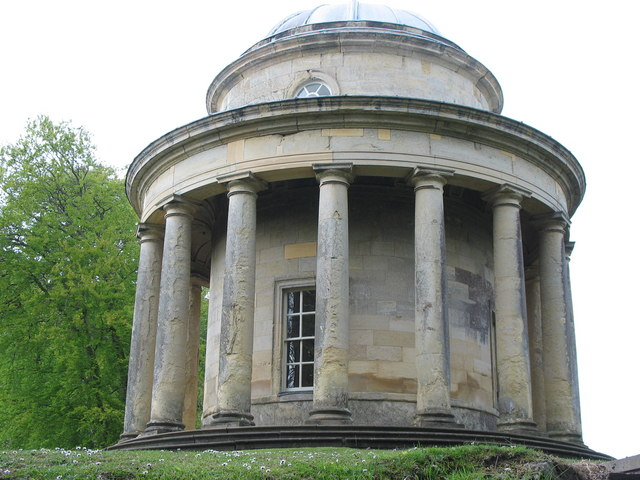
- Town Hall Helmsley Castle Helmsley Market Square All Saints Church Duncombe Park

- Location within North Yorkshire
- Population: 1,515 (2011 census)
- OS grid reference: SE617838
  - London: 195 mi (314 km) S
- Unitary authority: North Yorkshire
- Ceremonial county: North Yorkshire
- Region: Yorkshire and the Humber
- Country: England
- Sovereign state: United Kingdom
- Post town: YORK
- Postcode district: YO62
- Dialling code: 01439
- Police: North Yorkshire
- Fire: North Yorkshire
- Ambulance: Yorkshire
- UK Parliament: Thirsk and Malton

Helmsley is a market town and civil parish in North Yorkshire, England. Historically part of the North Riding of Yorkshire, the town is located at the point where Ryedale leaves the moorland and joins the flat Vale of Pickering.

Helmsley is situated on the River Rye on the A170 road, 14 miles (23 km) east of Thirsk, 13 miles (21 km) west of Pickering and some 24 miles (39 km) due north of York. The southern boundary of the North York Moors National Park passes through Helmsley along the A170 road so that the western part of the town is within the National Park.

The settlement grew around its position at a road junction and river crossing point. Helmsley is a compact town, retaining its medieval layout around its market place with more recent development to the north and south of its main thoroughfare, Bondgate. It is a historic town of considerable architectural character whose centre has been designated as a conservation area. The town is associated with the Earls of Feversham, whose ancestral home Duncombe Park was built overlooking Helmsley Castle. The Feversham Monument stands in the market place, along with the Helmsley Market Cross.

The town is a popular tourist centre and has won gold medals in the Large Village category of Yorkshire in Bloom for three years. The town square is a meeting place for motorcyclists as it is at the end of the B1257 road from Stokesley, which is a favourite with bikers.

The Cleveland Way National Trail starts at Helmsley, and follows a horseshoe loop around the North York Moors National Park and Yorkshire coast for 110 miles (180 km) to Filey. The remains of Helmsley Castle, which was destroyed in the Civil War, loom over the town.

== History ==
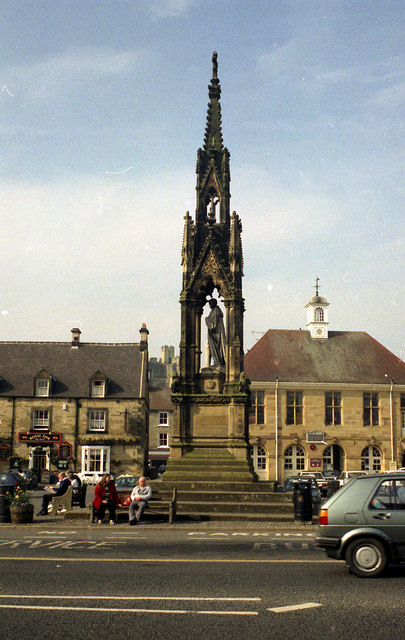
2nd Baron Feversham Monument, Town Square

Archaeological discoveries indicate that the area around Helmsley was first settled in around 3,000 BC and small farming communities existed here throughout the Neolithic, Bronze and Iron Ages and into Roman times. Finds of beehive querns confirm local agriculture and the milling of grain since at least the Iron Age. There are also reports of finds of Roman pottery and a second-century Roman coin. On 30 June 2011, the BBC Two programme History Cold Case featured an archaeological investigation into four 2,000-year-old skeletons found in Windy Pits caves, concluding that at least one had been the victim of a ritual killing, including scalping. The findings, including the facial reconstruction of the scalping victim, were presented, at Duncombe Park, to local history experts.

The ancient settlement, whose Old English name was Elmeslac, pre-dates the Domesday Book. It means ‘Helm’s forest clearing’ and indicates the nature of the landscape at that time. Vikings also left their mark in the Old Norse, "gate" ending of the names of many of the streets. The ownership of much of the town and its surrounding land has changed hands only twice since the Norman Conquest. After the conquest it was governed within the wapentake of Maneshou in the North Riding of Yorkshire, held by William the Conqueror’s half brother the Count of Mortain; land to the west of Helmsley was a royal deer park. The ancient pollarded oak trees in Duncombe Park date from this period and the park is now a national nature reserve. In about 1100 the estate passed to Walter Espec, founder of Rievaulx Abbey. Walter Espec’s heirs were the eldest surviving sons of his three sisters and the Helmsley properties devolved upon Robert De Ros, the son of the youngest sister, Adeline. In 1191 Robert de Ros granted Helmsley its Borough Charter, which established it as the market town.

The charter created the burgage plots – long, narrow plots which can still be seen in the property boundaries on the west side of Castlegate and east side of Bridge Street. Large-scale sheep farming, wool production and weaving were the mainstay of Helmsley’s economy for several centuries. Despite setbacks, including marauding Scots and the Black Death, Helmsley grew steadily throughout the Middle Ages. When wool production declined after the dissolution of Rievaulx Abbey, Helmsley’s weavers turned to flax, much of which was imported. The weavers were located on Bond and Bridge Streets. By the beginning of the 17th century the form of Helmsley was largely complete, and many buildings in use today date from this period. The oldest surviving house is Canon's Garth, a former vicarage. The town remained with the holders of the barony of De Ros through the Earls of Rutland and the Dukes of Buckingham until it was sold to the city financier, Sir Charles Duncombe in about 1689.

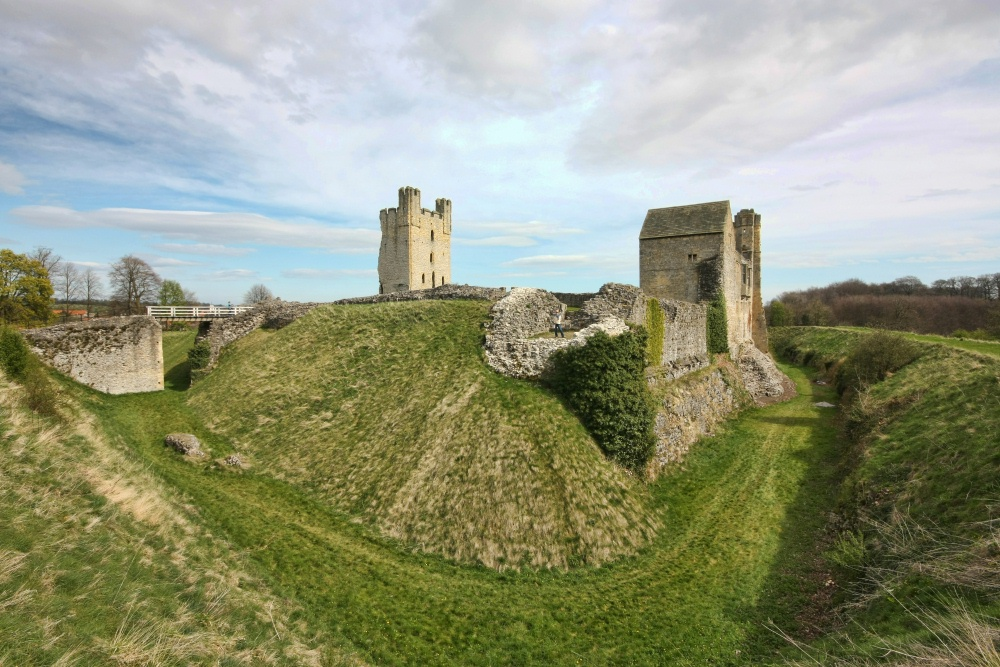
Helmsley Castle (April 2009)

The ruined Norman castle is the most significant medieval survival of the buildings in the town, although parts of the parish church and Canon's Garth are medieval in origin. The 18th and 19th centuries saw major developments and expansion in the hands of the Duncombe family, beginning with the construction of Duncombe Park outside the town.

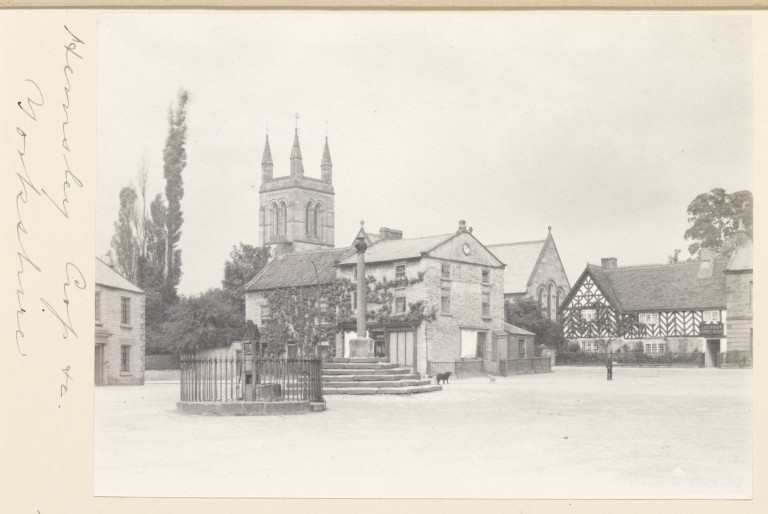
Helmsley in 1892

At the beginning of the 19th century the cottage weaving industry declined in the face of competition from new industrial cities. Despite this, the 19th century saw various major development in the town, notably the rebuilding of All Saints' Church, and at the end of the century, building of Helmsley Town Hall. More houses were built along Bondgate and, after the arrival of the railway in 1871, along Station Road. This period also saw older houses remodelled so that little thatch remained in the town. With the decline of weaving, agriculture became the mainstay of the economy.

== Conservation area ==
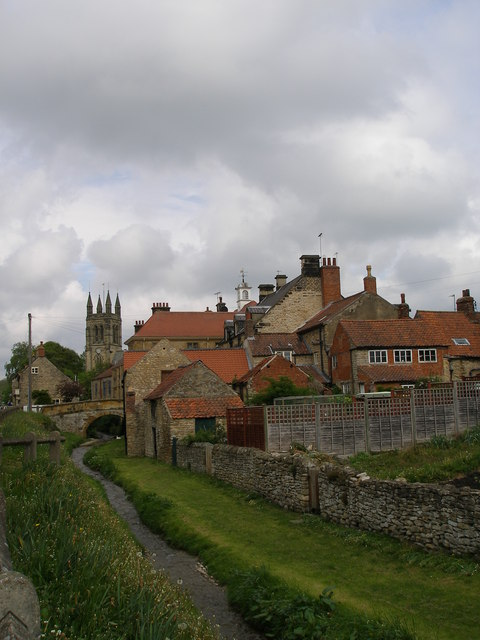
Looking up Borough Beck

The conservation area covers about 91.2 acres (36.9 hectares) and contains some 433 buildings within its bounds. It contains all 51 listed buildings in the town, approximately 12% of the building stock, and two scheduled ancient monuments. Of the listed buildings, 48 are classified Grade II and three are Grade II*. Most small buildings in the conservation area are built of local cream and honey-coloured stone. Most buildings, even those of higher status, are constructed using rubble stone which has been laid to course. Most roofs are covered with pantiles. Some of the larger, more imposing town houses and civic buildings have been constructed using ashlar stone and slate as a demonstration of affluence.

== Geography ==
Helmsley is situated on the southern boundary of the North York Moors National Park approximately 200 feet (61 m) above sea level. The town's geology is sandstone. To the west and the north of the settlement the moorland areas are predominantly limestone. Helmsley lies in a hollow in undulating open countryside, flanked by heather moor to the north and the rolling farmland of the Howardian Hills to the south. The flat lowland of the Vale of Pickering stretches eastwards from the town towards Malton. The River Rye runs by the town to the south where it is joined at Rye Bridge by the Borough Beck flowing southwards through the town from the moors. Meadows south of the Rye form an important buffer and create an attractive setting for the town from the southern approach. The area was affected by flash flooding on the night of 19 June 2005.

== Governance ==
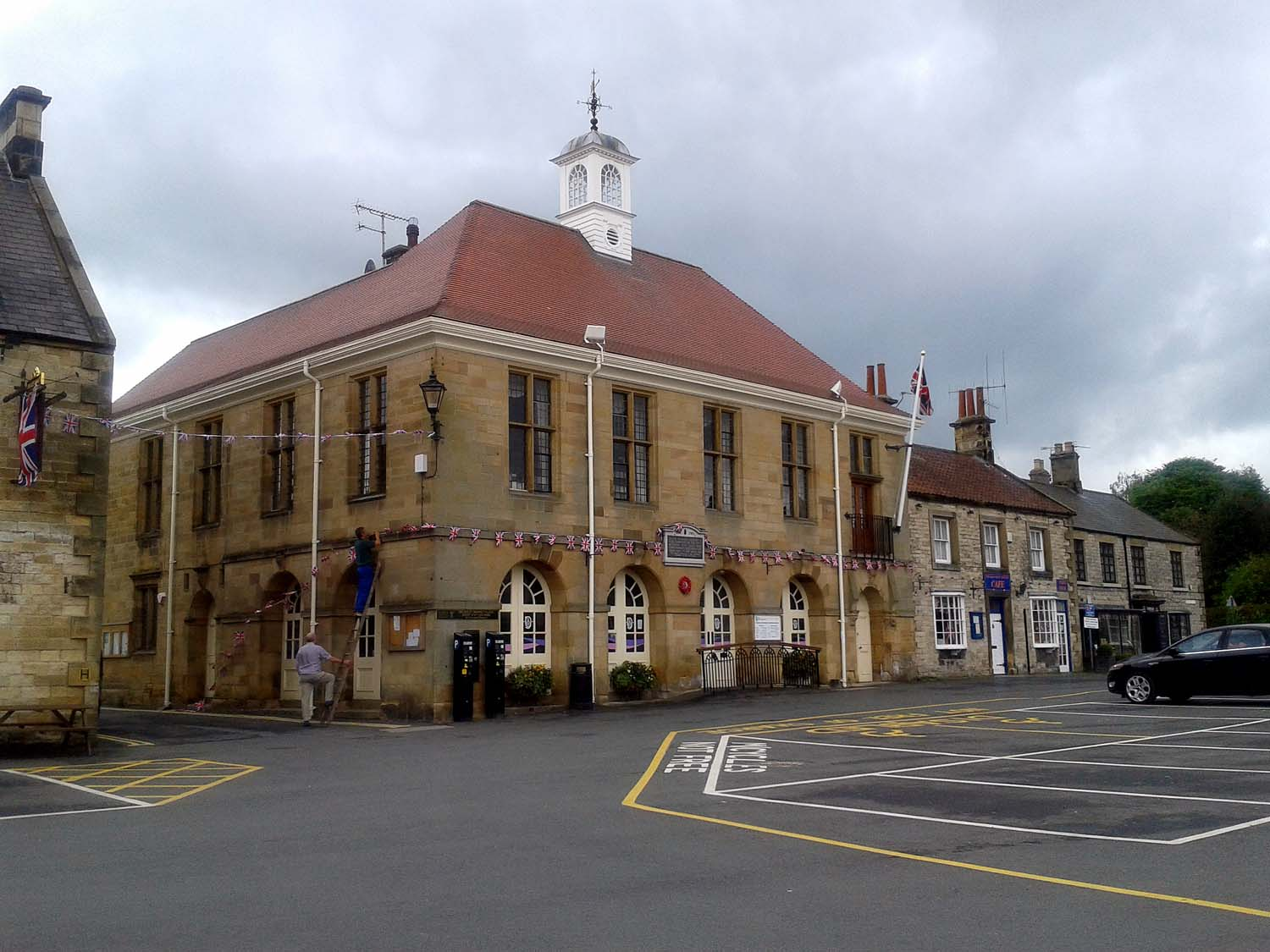
Helmsley Town Hall

Helmsley was part of the Ryedale district between 1974 and 2023. It is now administered by North Yorkshire Council.

An electoral ward covering Helmsley existed within Ryedale district: this ward stretched north from Helmsley, with a total population of 3,066 measured at the 2011 Census. Since 2022, Helmsley and Sinnington division has been represented by one councillor.

== Population ==
The population of the larger Helmsley ward area was recorded by the 2001 Census as being 3,097. North Yorkshire County Council, however, estimated in 2000 that the population of the actual urban town area was approximately 1,500, measured at 1,515 in the 2011 census. The town is in the catchment area of Ryedale School.

== Economy and education ==
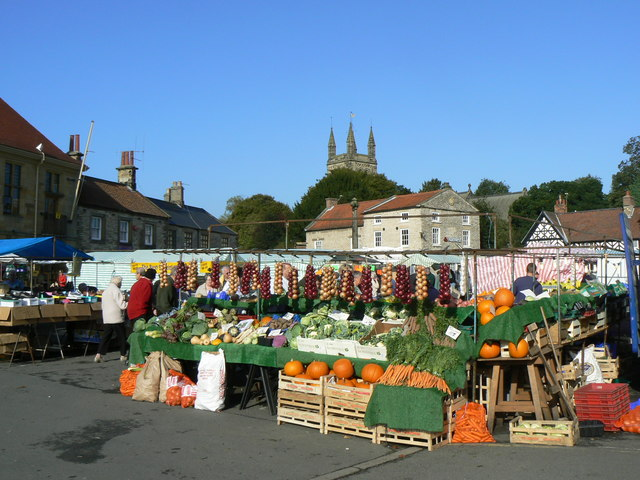
Helmsley Market Place (October 2006)

In the late 20th century a large amount of housing was built on backland sites in the older part of town and in residential developments outside its historic core and a small industrial estate was developed in the south-eastern corner. Developments included award-winning council house development at Elmslac Road in the 1950s, a primary school, health centre, "affordable housing" at Storey Close, housing for the elderly at Elm Green and Pottergate and development of the industrial sector, particularly Thomas's Bakery and a veterinary surgery. The castle visitor centre provides an important attraction for the town. Helmsley is well provided with retail space but less well provided with office space. The main employers are Duncombe Park Estate, Thomas the Bakers and the North York Moors National Park Authority. The industrial estate is a vital economic asset of Helmsley.

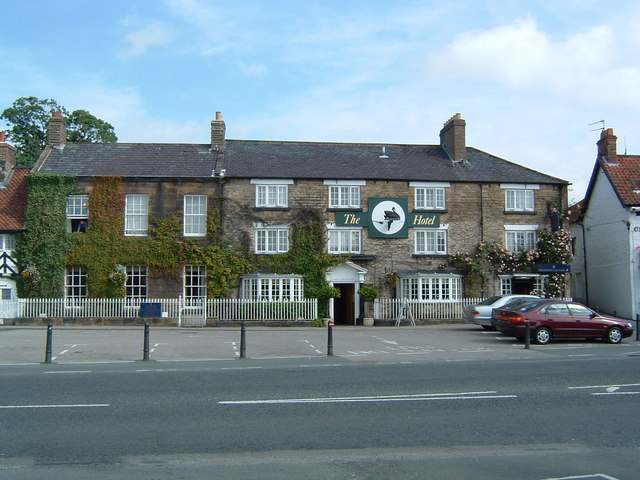
The Black Swan Hotel

Tourism plays an important role in the area's economy. The national park receives around 9 million day-visits each year. Day visitors make up 40% of all visitor days, with people staying within the park making up 31% and people staying outside the park making up 29%. 31% of park visitors stay in serviced accommodation, compared with 64% who stay in self-catering accommodation. Daily expenditure in the national park is approximately £9.10 per person, which excludes accommodation costs. Visitor revenue within the national park was £169 million in 1998, £152 million in 1997 and £119 million in 1996. This can be compared to the figure for the whole of North Yorkshire, which stood at £1,054 million in 1996. However, employment in tourism is, by nature, seasonal. Helmsley draws the largest number of day visitors (32%) within the year, for the North York Moors National Park as a whole. It attracts 37% of longer stay visitors.

Helmsley Community Primary School is on Carlton Lane.

== Culture, media and sport ==
Helmsley Arts Centre has a 140-seat auditorium and 40-seat studio/exhibition space. It provides film screenings, live music, theatre performances, comedy clubs, art exhibitions and workshops/classes. The 1812 Theatre Company is the resident amateur theatre company at the centre. It mounts at least three productions per year in the main theatre and two in the studio. The 1812 Youth Theatre meets there on a regular basis, putting on two shows a year.

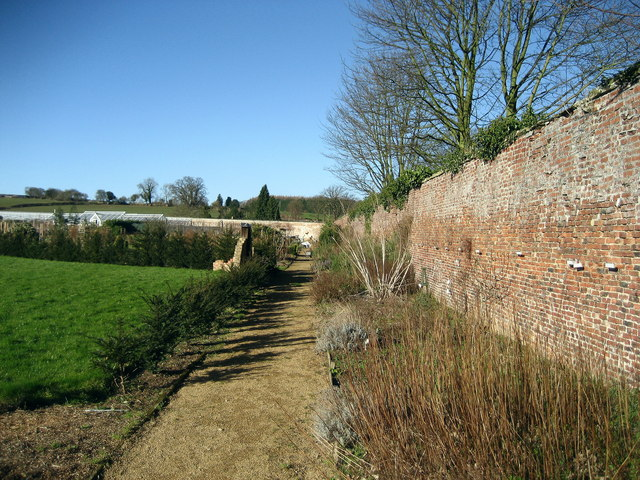
Inside the Walled Garden

The indie rock band One Night Only is from the town.

The five-acre (2 ha) Helmsley Walled Garden, originally built in 1756, is being restored as a working kitchen garden. A walled garden for the castle stood along the banks of the river to the south. Soon after the family moved out of the castle into Duncombe Park this walled garden was built. The garden incorporates glass houses designed in 1850 as a vine house. The ongoing programme of restoration uses appropriate plants where possible.

Helmsley has an open-air swimming pool and a recreation ground providing facilities for tennis, bowls, cricket and football. The Cleveland Way, a horseshoe-shaped route around the North York Moors National Park starts in Helmsley. It follows the moor's western escarpment to meet the coast at Saltburn-by-the-Sea, and then follows the North Yorkshire and Cleveland Heritage Coast to end at Filey. Other places of interest include the National Centre for Birds of Prey, Rievaulx Abbey and Helmsley Arts Centre.

Local news and television programmes are provided by BBC North East and Cumbria and ITV Tyne Tees. Television signals are received from the nearby Bilsdale TV transmitter. BBC Yorkshire and ITV Yorkshire are also received through cable and satellite television such as Freesat and Sky.

The town's local radio stations are BBC Radio York on 103.7 FM and Greatest Hits Radio York and North Yorkshire on 104.7 FM.

Local newspapers are the Malton and Pickering Mercury and the Gazette and Herald. Helmsley Library is situated at the front of the town hall, in the Market Place. Staff at the library received an award for North Yorkshire County Council's Library of the Year in 2010.

=== Helmsley Archive ===
The Helmsley Archive is a collection of more than 5,000 images illustrating the history of Helmsley over the last 150 years. John Collier bequeathed his collection to Helmsley Town Council who, with the Ryedale Area Committee of North Yorkshire County Council, support the project. The archive is being augmented by local residents.

== Religion ==
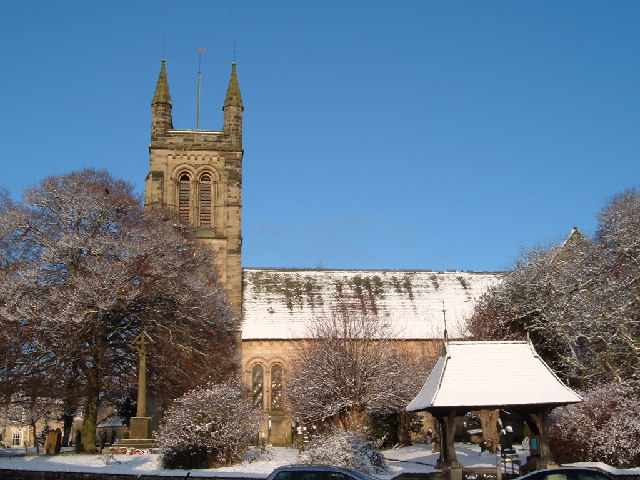
Church of All Saints

There are four churches in Helmsley. The Anglican church is the Church of All Saints, a Grade II* listed building. St Mary's Church, Helmsley is a Catholic church.

The tune 'Helmsley' for the hymn Lo! He comes with clouds descending, dated 1763, is attributed to Thomas Olivers, 1725-1799, who preached widely in the British Isles.

== See also ==
- Listed buildings in Helmsley
- AmpleBosom
