= Duncombe =

Duncombe may refer to:

== People ==
- Anthony Duncombe, 1st Baron Feversham (c.1695–1763), British landowner and politician
- Anthony Duncombe (died 1708), English politician
- Arthur Duncombe (Royal Navy officer) (1806–1889), Royal Navy admiral and Member of Parliament
- Arthur Duncombe (1840–1911), British politician
- Augustus Duncombe (1814–1880), Church of England priest, Dean of York
- Charles Duncombe (disambiguation), several people
- David Duncombe (1802–1887), Canadian physician and politician
- Francis Duncombe (c.1653–1720), English politician
- A. Jane Duncombe (1925–2015), Canadian architect
- Jasper Duncombe, 7th Baron Feversham (born 1968), British adult film producer
- John Duncombe (Bury St Edmunds MP) (1622–1687), English politician
- John Duncombe (writer) (1729–1786), English clergyman and writer
- Julena Steinheider Duncombe (1911–2003), American mathematics teacher and astronomer
- L. C. R. Duncombe-Jewell (1866–1947), British soldier, special war correspondent of The Times and Morning Post, sportsman and sometimes poet
- Nick Duncombe (1982–2003), English rugby union footballer
- Octavius Duncombe (1817–1879), British politician
- Peter Duncombe, 6th Baron Feversham (1945–2009), British writer
- Ronald Duncombe, Bahamian politician
- Susanna Duncombe (1725–1812), English poet and artist
- Thomas Duncombe (died 1746) (c.1683–1746), British Member of Parliament
- Thomas Duncombe (died 1779) (1724–1779), British Member of Parliament
- Thomas Slingsby Duncombe (1796–1861), British MP
- William Duncombe (disambiguation), several people
- Baron Feversham, British title held by persons with surname Duncombe
- Duncombe baronets, two baronetcies created for persons with surname Duncombe

== Places ==
- 3368 Duncombe, a minor planet
- Duncombe, Iowa, United States
- Duncombe, Lancashire, England
- Duncombe Creek (Uwharrie River tributary), Montgomery County, North Carolina
- Duncombe Park, the seat of the Duncombe family, Helmsley, North Yorkshire
