= List of people educated at Gordonstoun =

Former pupils of Gordonstoun in Moray are known as Gordonstounians. They include the following people. See also The Category for Gordonstounians

== Royalty and aristocracy ==
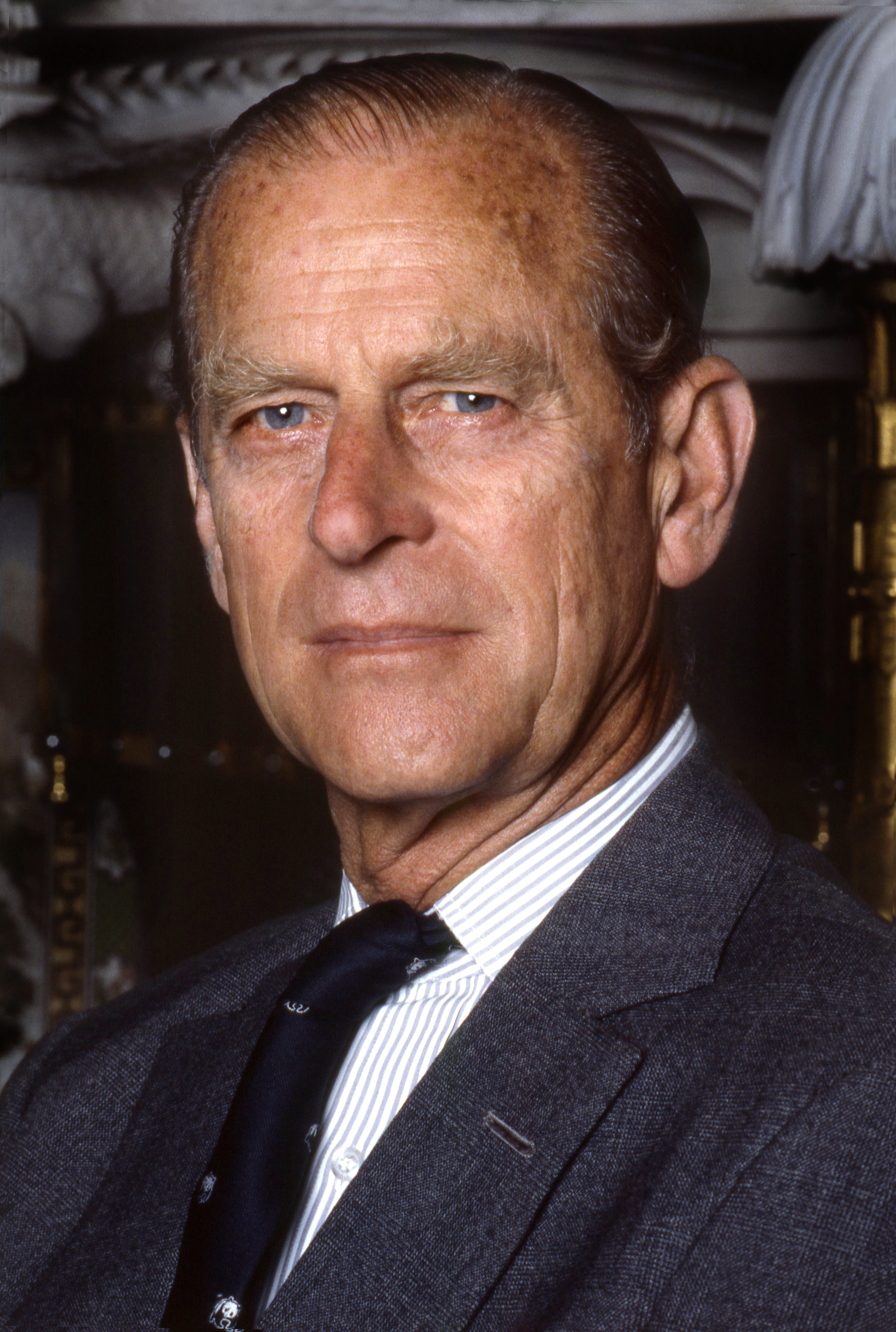
Prince Philip, Duke of Edinburgh

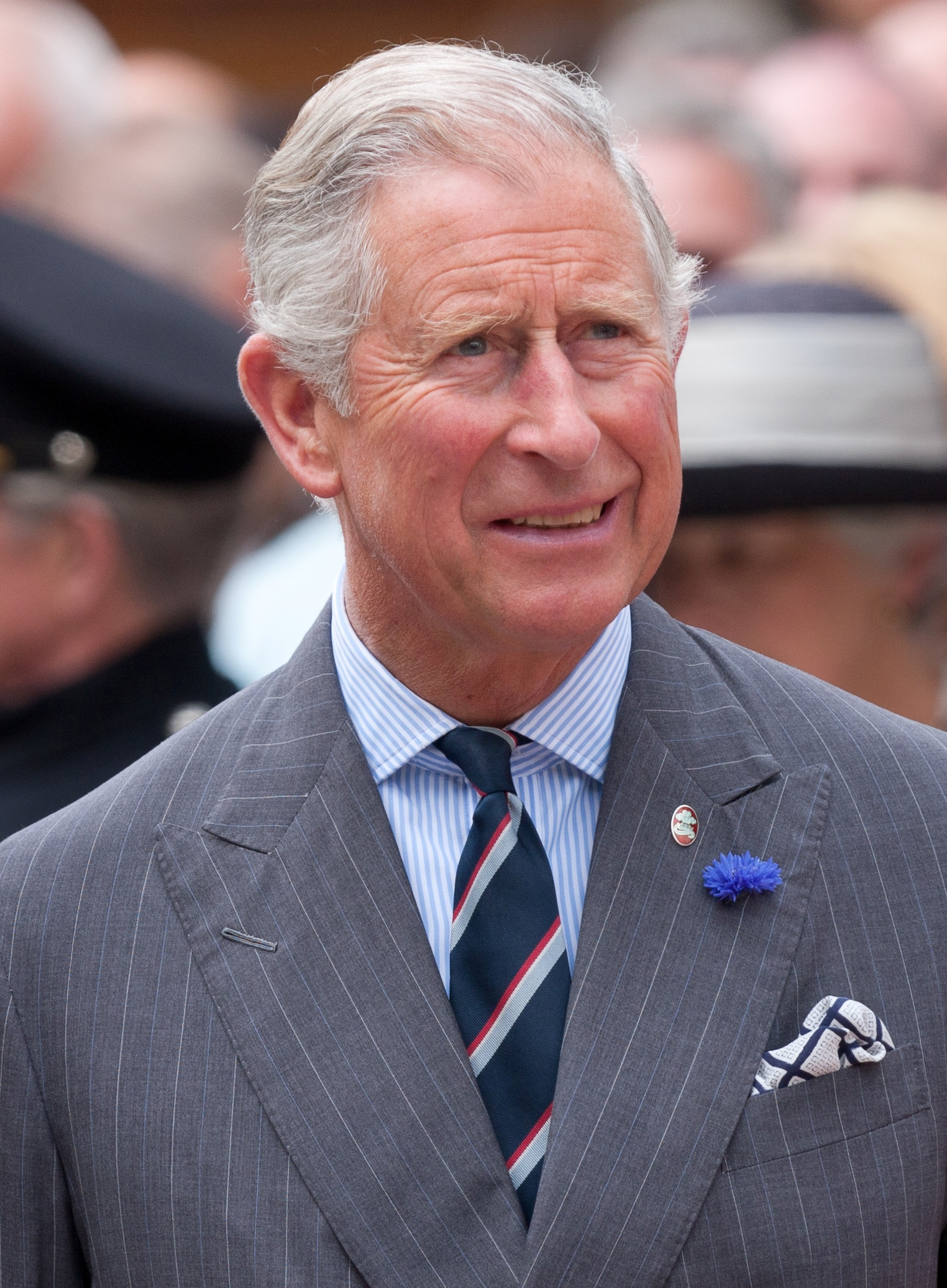
King Charles III

- Alexander, Crown Prince of Yugoslavia
- Mohammed Bin Zayed Al Nahyan, Crown Prince of Abu Dhabi
- Andrew Mountbatten-Windsor
- Prince Philip, Duke of Edinburgh
- King Charles III
- Lord Ivar Mountbatten
- Peter Phillips
- Zara Phillips
- Angus Montagu, 12th Duke of Manchester
- Paul-Philippe Hohenzollern
- Granville Gordon, 13th Marquess of Huntly
- Alexander Douglas-Hamilton, 16th Duke of Hamilton
- Michael Pearson, 4th Viscount Cowdray
- John Grant, 13th Earl of Dysart
- James Carnegie, 3rd Duke of Fife
- Prince Edward, Duke of Edinburgh
- Norton Knatchbull, 8th Baron Brabourne
- Jasper Duncombe, 7th Baron Feversham
- Nicholas Alexander, 7th Earl of Caledon

== Culture ==
- Duncan Jones, formerly known as Zowie Bowie – film director and son of musician David Bowie
- Jason Connery, actor and son of actor Sean Connery
- Alistair Gosling – Founder of Extreme Sports Channel and Extreme International
- Rosalind Eleazar, British actress

=== Music ===
- Roy Williamson of the Corries – musician, writer of Flower of Scotland, one of two unofficial Scottish national anthems
- Dick Heckstall-Smith – musician
- Luca Prodan – musician
- Barry Cooper – musicologist
- Jo Hamilton – musician

=== Writers – poets, novelists, dramatists ===
- William Boyd – writer
- Allan Scott (Scottish screenwriter)

=== Journalists and biographers ===
- Isabel Oakeshott

== Science ==
- Francis Huxley - anthropologist
- David Stronach - archaeologist

== Military ==
Vice Admiral Sir James Weatherall - Senior Royal Navy officer who served as Deputy Supreme Allied Commander Atlantic from 1989 to 1991 and then as Her Majesty's Marshal of the Diplomatic Corps from 1992 to 2001. Also first commanding officer of the Royal Navy's flagship the Ark Royal

== Politics ==
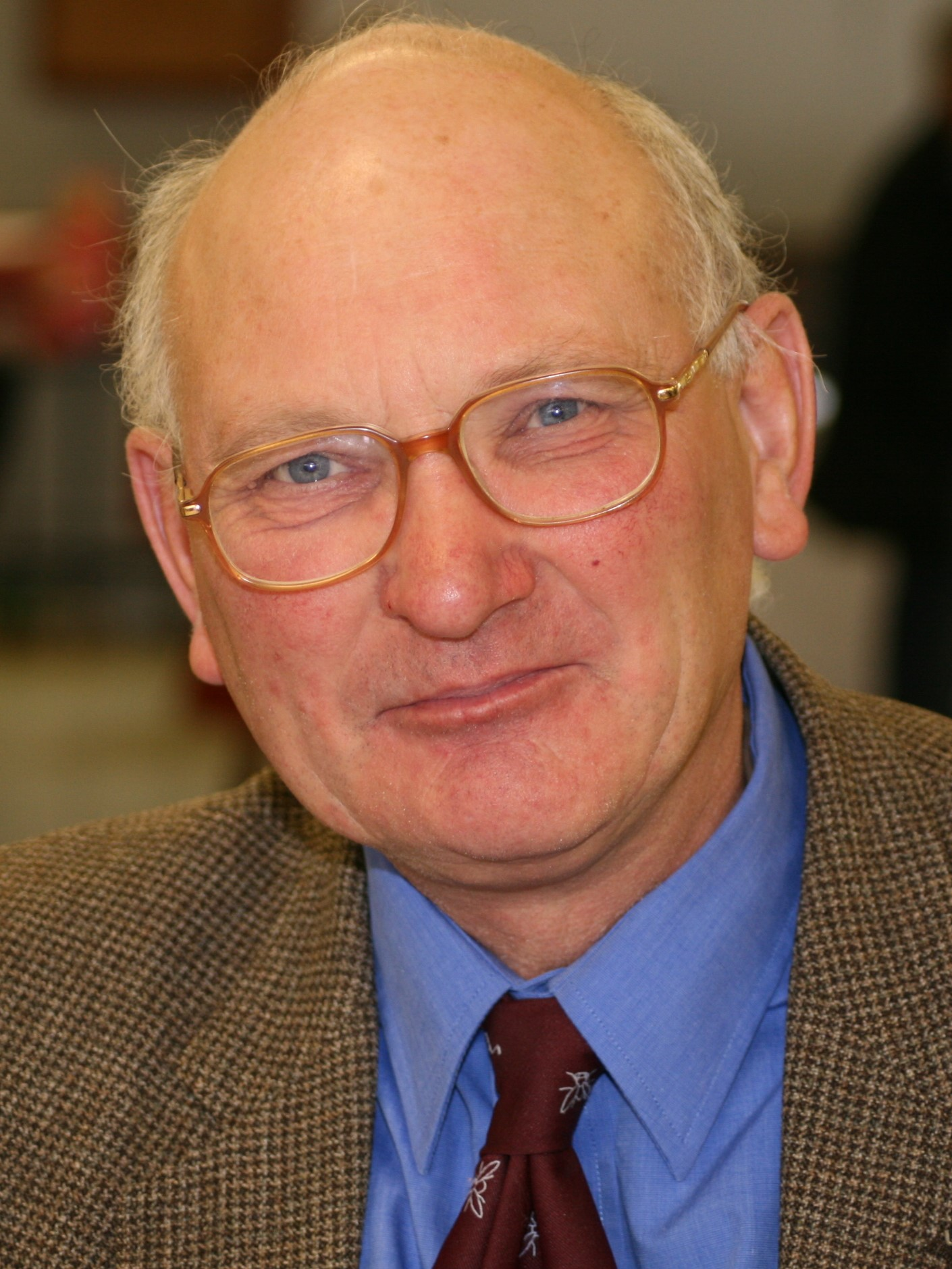
UKIP MEP Stuart Agnew

- Stuart Agnew - UKIP MEP

== Business ==
- John Barton – Chairman of Next plc and EasyJet

== Sport ==
- Heather Stanning OBE – Army Officer and ex professional rower (double Olympic champion, double World champion)

== Fictional ==
Gordonstoun also has a notable fictional alumna, the heroine of Tomb Raider, Lara Croft was supposed to have attended the school in sixth year, and has also been used to advertise it.
