= Charles Duncombe =

Charles Duncombe may refer to:

- Charles Duncombe (English banker) (1648–1711), English banker, MP and Lord Mayor
- Charles Duncombe, 1st Baron Feversham (1764–1841), English MP
- Charles Duncombe (Upper Canada Rebellion) (1792–1867), American physician and politician in Canada and USA
- Charles Duncombe, 2nd Earl of Feversham (1879–1916), English Conservative MP; known as Viscount Helmsley 1881–1915
- Charles Duncombe, 3rd Earl of Feversham (1906–1963), English Conservative MP; son of 2nd Earl; Viscount Helmsley 1915–1916

== See also ==
- Duncombe (disambiguation)
