= Drainie Carved Stones =

The Drainie carved stones are a collection of 32 Pictish stones originating from the important early medieval monastic settlement of Kinneddar on the outskirts of the modern town of Lossiemouth in Moray, Scotland. Despite their name, the majority were discovered at Kinneddar—the location of the manse of the parish of Drainie from which they take their name—rather than the separate settlement of Drainie which lay several miles to the west.

The 32 stone fragments likely represent the remains of ten cross-slabs, three free-standing crosses and at least eight panels from stone shrine chests. Some of the sculpture is unfinished, showing that it was produced on-site at Kinneddar.

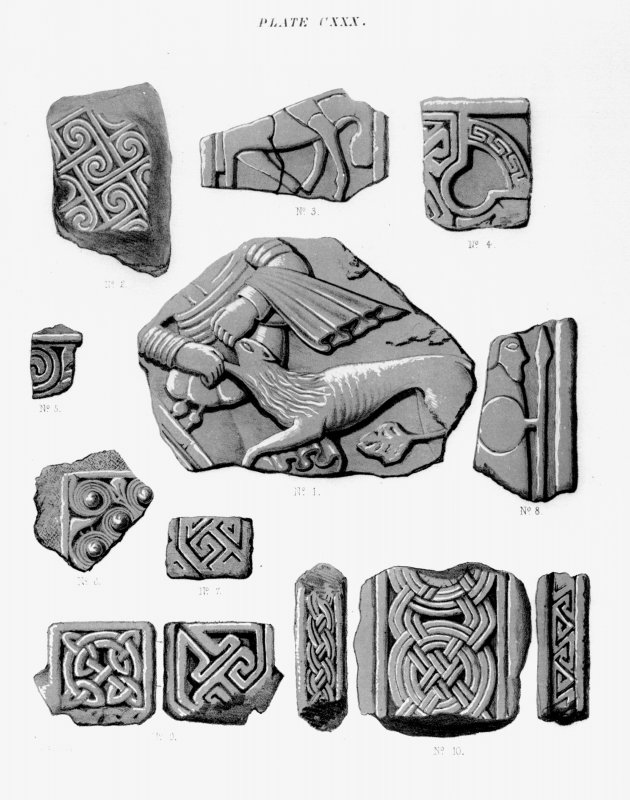
Drainie 2, 3, 4, 5, 6, 7, 8, 9, 10 and 16

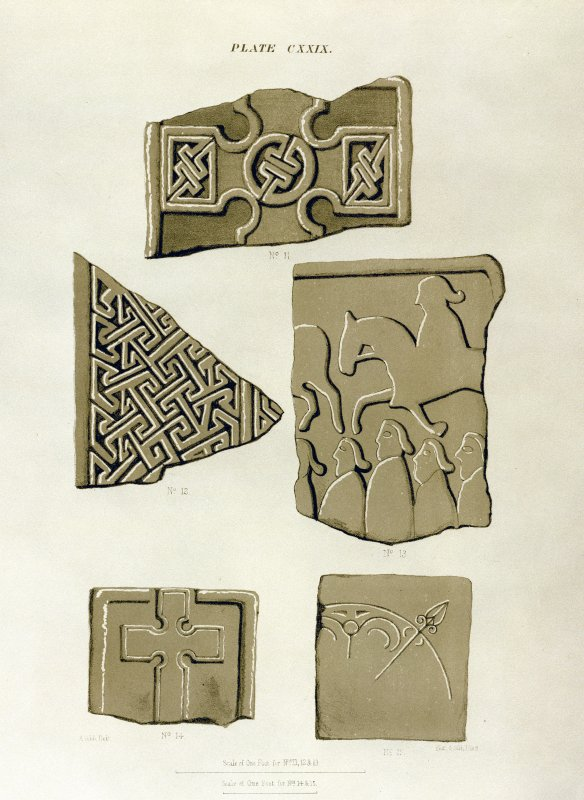
Drainie 1, 11, 12, 13, and 17

	Type	Date	Dimensions	Location found	Date found	Current location	Notes
Drainie 1	Symbol stone	7th century	H 0.75m x W 0.63m x D 0.10m	Drainie Manse, Kinneddar	1855	Lost	
Drainie 2	Cross-slab fragment	8th or 9th century	H 0.28m x W 0.19m x D 0.08m	Kinneddar	In or before 1855	Elgin Museum	
Drainie 3	Cross-slab fragments	9th or 10th century	H 0.16m x W 0.30m x 0.06m	Kinneddar	In or before 1855	Elgin Museum	Broken into two fragments, Drainie 3 formed part of the same cross slab as Drainie 8.
Drainie 4	Cross-slab fragment	9th century	H 0.23m x W 0.19m x D 0.10m	Kinneddar	In or before 1855	Elgin Museum	
Drainie 5	Carved fragment	8th or 9th century	H 0.08m x W 0.16m	Kinneddar	In or before 1855	Elgin Museum	Probably part of the same monument as Drainie 24, which was probably a shrine panel.
Drainie 6	Carved fragment	8th century	H 0.16m x W 0.16m x D 0.09m	Kinneddar	In or before 1855	Elgin Museum	Small fragment of a panel or cross-slab.
Drainie 7	Cross fragment	8th or 9th century	H 0.10m x W 0.13m x D 0.05m	Kinneddar	In or before 1855	Elgin Museum	May have formed part of a slender cross-shaft, that could have supported a cross-head such as Drainie 9.
Drainie 8	Cross-slab fragment	9th or 10th century	H 0.25m x W 0.16m x W 0.08m	Kinneddar	In or before 1855	Elgin Museum	Part of the same cross slab as Drainie 3.
Drainie 9	Cross fragment	9th century	H 0.18m x W 0.15m x D 0.05m	Kinneddar	In or before 1855	Elgin Museum	Probably part of the side arm of a ringed cross.
Drainie 10	Cross-shaft fragment	9th century	H 0.28m x W 0.28m x D 0.13m	Kinneddar	In or before 1855	Elgin Museum	Part of a slender tapered cross-shaft.
Drainie 11	Cross-slab fragment	9th century	H 0.26m x W 0.48m x D 0.11m	Kinneddar	In or before 1855	Elgin Museum	
Drainie 12	Cross-slab fragment	8th or 9th century	H 0.38m x W 0.33m x D 0.33m	Kinneddar	In or before 1855	Elgin Museum	
Drainie 13	Shrine panel fragment	9th or 10th century	H 0.46m x W 0.34m x D 0.06m	Kinneddar	In or before 1855	Elgin Museum	Carvings include images of parts of two galloping horses with five human figures beneath.
Drainie 14	Carved fragment	8th or 9th century	H 0.45m x W 0.27m x D 0.04m	Kinneddar Old Kirkyard	1884	Elgin Museum, on loan from National Museums Scotland	Carvings include images of parts of two galloping horses with five human figures beneath.
Drainie 15	Cross-slab fragments	9th or 10th century	H 0.31m x W 0.31m x D 0.06m	Kinneddar Old Kirkyard	1900	Elgin Museum	Two fragments of the top-left hand corner of a cross-slab.
Drainie 16	Carved fragment	8th century	H 0.46m x W 0.46m x D 0.18m	Kinneddar	In or before 1855	Elgin Museum	High relief carving of part of a scene showing David rending the jaws of a lion.
Drainie 17	Cross-slab fragment	8th or 9th century	H 0.43m x W 0.61m x D 0.09m	Kinneddar	In or before 1855	Elgin Museum	Possibly part of a cross-slab or possibly part of an altar frontal.
Drainie 18	Shrine panel fragments	8th or 9th century	H 0.66m x W 0.93m x D 0.08m	Kinneddar Old Kirkyard	1939	Elgin Museum	Four adjacent fragments of a shrine panel.
Drainie 19	Unfinished cross-slab fragment	8th or 9th century	H 0.45m x W 0.25m x D 0.06m	Kinneddar Old Kirkyard	1960	Elgin Museum	Fragment of a highly irregular cross-slab carving, suggesting that it is part of an unfinished monument.
Drainie 20	Carved fragment	8th or 9th century	H 0.18m x W 0.11m x D 0.02m	In or near Kinneddar Old Kirkyard	After 1936	Elgin Museum	Very thin fragment - more likely to be part of a panel than a cross-slab.
Drainie 21	Carved fragment	8th or 9th century	H 0.16m x W 0.22m x D 0.05m	In or near Kinneddar Old Kirkyard	After 1936	Elgin Museum	Very thin fragment - more likely to be part of a panel than a cross-slab.
Drainie 22	Cross-shaft fragment	8th or 9th century	H 0.23m x W 0.16m x D 0.09m	In or near Kinneddar Old Kirkyard	After 1936	Elgin Museum	Part of a slender cross-shaft.
Drainie 23	Shrine panel fragment	8th century	H 0.22m x W 0.25m x D 0.06m	In or near Kinneddar Old Kirkyard	After 1936	Elgin Museum	Possibly part of the same monument as Drainie 26.
Drainie 24	Shrine panel fragment	8th or 9th century	H 0.30m x W 0.27m x D 0.09m	Kinneddar Old Kirkyard	1978	Elgin Museum	Probably part of the same monument as Drainie 5, which was probably a shrine panel.
Drainie 25	Cross-slab fragment	8th or 9th century	H 0.15m x W 0.19m x D 0.09m	Kinneddar Old Kirkyard	After 1936	Elgin Museum	Forms part of the side of a cross-slab with Drainie 27.
Drainie 26	Shrine panel fragment	8th century	H 0.15m x W 0.24m x D 0.09m	In or near Kinneddar Old Kirkyard	After 1936	Elgin Museum	Forms part of the top right-hand side of a shrine panel alongside Drainie 28. Possibly part of the same monument at Drainie 23.
Drainie 27	Cross-slab fragment	8th or 9th century	H 0.26m x W 0.20m x D 0.09m	In or near Kinneddar Old Kirkyard	After 1936	Elgin Museum	Forms part of the side of a cross-slab with Drainie 25.
Drainie 28	Shrine panel fragment	8th century	H 0.08m x W 0.08m x D 0.09m	In or near Kinneddar Old Kirkyard	After 1936	Elgin Museum	Forms part of the top right-hand side of a shrine panel alongside Drainie 26. Possibly part of the same monument at Drainie 23.
Drainie 29	Shrine panel fragment	8th century	H 0.19m x W 0.18m x D 0.08m	In or near Kinneddar Old Kirkyard	After 1936	Elgin Museum	Part of the top of a hybrid post-and-panel, or the end-panel of a shrine.
Drainie 30	Carved fragment	8th or 9th century	H 0.12m x W 0.14m x D 0.07m	In or near Kinneddar Old Kirkyard	After 1936	Elgin Museum	Small fragment, possibly part of a cross-slab.
Drainie 31	Carved fragment	Uncertain	H 0.18m x W 0.18m	In or near Kinneddar Old Kirkyard	After 1936	Elgin Museum	Severely damaged carved fragment.
Drainie 32	Cross-slab fragment	Uncertain	H 0.46m x W 0.38m x D 0.08m	Gordonstoun School	c. 1965	Elgin Museum	Discovered at Gordonstoun School in a dump of stones removed from the Old Kirk at Drainie when it was demolished for the extension of the runway of RAF Lossiemouth in 1953. Probably originated at Kinneddar as stone from Kinneddar was used in the construction of Drainie Kirk in the 17th century.
