= Level Up =

Level Up may refer to:

== Film and TV ==
- Level Up (British TV series), a UK children's TV programme that was broadcast on CBBC in 2006
- Level Up (American TV series), a Cartoon Network live action series
  - Level Up (2011 film), the movie pilot for the Cartoon Network series
- Level Up (2016 film), a British thriller film
- "Level Up" (Cloak & Dagger), the twentieth episode and Season 2 finale of Freeform's 2018 live series of Cloak & Dagger
- Level Up (South Korean TV series), a 2019 South Korean romantic comedy

== Music ==
- "Level Up" (Ciara song), a 2018 song by American singer Ciara
- "Level Up" (Sway song), a 2012 song by Ghanaian-British musician Sway
- Level Up, album by Stevie Stone
- "Level Up", a song by Burna Boy from his 2020 album Twice as Tall
- "Level Up", a song by Vienna Teng from her 2013 album Aims
- "Level Up!", a 2024 song by 6arelyhuman and Odetari

== Other uses ==
- Level Up (comics), a 2011 graphic novel written by Gene Luen Yang and drawn by Thien Pham

== See also ==
- Levelling up (disambiguation)
