= John Barton (businessman) =

British businessman (1944–2021)

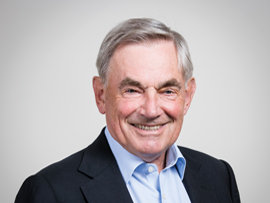
- Born: Robert John Orr Barton; 23 August 1944; Lahore, British India (now Pakistan)
- Died: 4 December 2021 (aged 77)
- Education: Gordonstoun
- Alma mater: University of Strathclyde
- Occupations: Chairman, Next plc Chairman, EasyJet
- Board member of: Next plc EasyJet; SSP Group
- Spouse: Anne Barton

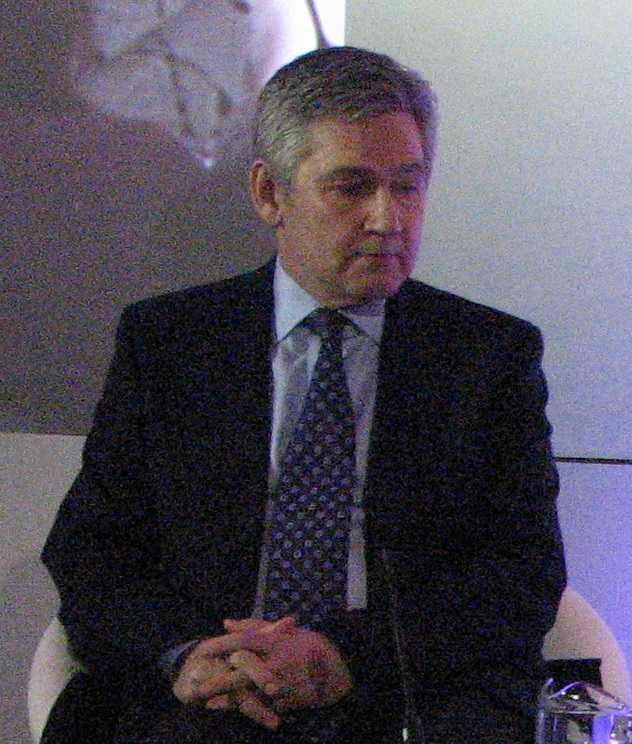
John Bartin in 2010

Robert John Orr Barton (23 August 1944 – 4 December 2021) was a British businessman, who was chairman of Next plc and EasyJet.

== Early life ==
Barton was born in August 1944, in Lahore during the British Raj. He was educated at Gordonstoun, completed an MBA at University of Strathclyde, and was a chartered accountant.

== Career ==
Barton became a member of the board of Next in 2002, deputy chairman in 2004 and chairman in 2006. He was the chairman of EasyJet and a non-executive director of SSP Group.

Barton was the chief executive of JIB Group, and chairman of Cable & Wireless, Catlin Group, Jardine Lloyd Thompson, Wellington Underwriting, and Brit plc, and a non-executive director of WH Smith and Hammerson.

== Personal life ==
Barton lived in the UK. He was married to Anne. He died suddenly on 4 December 2021, at the age of 77.
