= William Duncombe (disambiguation) =

William Duncombe (1690–1769) was a British author and playwright.

William Duncombe may also refer to:

- Sir William Duncombe, 2nd Baronet (1658–1706), of the Duncombe baronets
- William Duncombe (composer) (c. 1736–1738–1818/19), English composer
- William Duncombe, 2nd Baron Feversham (1798–1867), British landowner and politician
- William Duncombe, 1st Earl of Feversham (1829–1915), British politician
- William Duncombe, Viscount Helmsley (1852–1881), British politician
