= Levelling up =

Levelling up (or leveling up) may refer to:

- The Levelling-up policy of the British government, instigated by Boris Johnson in 2019, and present in various departmental and ministerial titles:
  - Department for Levelling Up, Housing and Communities
  - Secretary of State for Levelling Up, Housing and Communities
  - Shadow Secretary of State for Levelling Up, Housing and Communities
- Gaining enough experience points to reach the next level in computer, video or role-playing games
- Leveling Up, a 2013 play by American playwright Deborah Zoe Laufer
