= Robotics Education & Competition Foundation =

American non-profit robotics organization

The Robotics Education & Competition Foundation
- Industry: Education; Robotics; STEM
- Founded: 2011
- Headquarters: Greenville, Texas
- Area served: 1.1 million participants in 70 countries
- Key people: Dan Mantz (CEO); Cori Lathan (Board Member); Mike Harris (Chief Innovation and Technology Officer); Mary Lou Ewald (Director)
- Products: VEX Robotics; Girl Powered

The Robotics Education & Competition Foundation (REC Foundation or RECF) is a 501(c)(3) non-profit organization that was best known for managing competitions and programs for the VEX Robotics Competition. Over 1.1 million students have participated in RECF programs around the world. The organization’s mission is to provide more students with the opportunity to engage in STEM.

== Relationship with VEX Robotics ==
The REC Foundation began as the education division of VEX Robotics, inc. in 2008 to develop educational programs for the VEX Robotics Competition. In 2011, three employees of the educational division formed the REC Foundation in response to the growing size of the competition and the increase in companies hoping to provide philanthropic support.

The REC Foundation worked closely with VEX Robotics, inc. to bring the VEX Robotics competition to hundreds of thousands of competitors. VEX Robotics, inc. designed and manufactured parts for building robots such as electronics, hardware, and scoring objects for each year’s game. The REC Foundation hosted the competitions and events competitors compete at, including the Worlds Championships. While VEX Robotics, inc. and the REC Foundation closely collaborated on the VEX Robotics competition, they are separate organizations with their own executive and company structures. The REC Foundation also hosts competitions and programs beyond VEX Robotics, such as the Aerial Drone Competition and the International Robotics Honor Society.

Alleged Robotics Education & Competition Foundation, Inc debts to VEX Robotics, Inc.

In April 2026, the REC Foundation was sued by VEX Robotics in VEX Robotics, Inc vs. Robotics Education & Competition Foundation, Inc. VEX Robotics, inc claims that REC Foundation has unpaid debts amounting to a total of $10,334,028.45 American dollars to VEX Robotics. It is speculated that the later split between the REC Foundation and VEX Robotics can be attributed to this case.

In May 2026, the REC Foundation announced the end of its relationship with VEX Robotics, inc. and its plans to expand its robotics programs. These announced plans include the REC Foundation hosting its own robotics competitions based on VEX Robotics' games with slightly modified rules. VEX Robotics has stated that " all game rules, game design concepts, scoring systems, field specifications, field element designs, robot construction parameters, tournament structures, game design philosophy, and all other content contained" in their manuals for their latest competition games are exclusive intellectual property of VEX Robotics. Additionally, VEX Robotics' co-founders Tony Norman and Bob Mimlitch have also made a statement that the REC Foundation is not authorized "by VEX Robotics to organize, administer, sanction, or represent VEX Robotics competitions in any capacity" in an email to various teams registered with VEX Robotics and associated programs. These developments indicate a worsening relationship between VEX Robotics and the REC Foundation.

In June 2026, the REC Foundation announced a series of new competitions: the RECF Engage Robotics Competition, the RECF Achieve Robotics Competition, and the RECF Inspire Robotics Competition. These competition do allow teams to use hardware, software, and robots legal under VEX Robotics's IQ and V5 competitions. This development seems to go against Tony Norman's and Bob Mimlitch previous statements and the notice on the former event website for VEX Robotics' competitions. The REC Foundation's game manuals indicate that their competition will be using game elements similar or identical to those produced and distributed by VEX Robotics.

=== Judging ===
In addition to match play, a key part of VEX Robotics competitions is competition judging. The REC Foundation oversaw judging and decides award criteria for VEX Robotics competitions. The goal of judged awards was for students to become familiar with using industry tools such as documentation. Judges take into consideration the team’s engineering notebook, team interview, team performance in the competition, and general team conduct when deciding awards.

The awards offered by the REC Foundation include:

- Excellence Award: This award is given to the best overall team at the competition. The team must rank near the top of all competition rankings and receive high scores on the engineering notebook and team interview.
- Design Award: This is the highest judged award at VEX Robotics competitions. Teams must receive high scores on the engineering notebook and team interview as well as demonstrate their use of the engineering design process and time management.
- Innovate Award: The innovate award is given to the team who best documents the use of the design process for a unique design on the robot. The team should be able to point to the specific section in their notebook that documents the design of the mechanism.
- Think Award: This award is given to a team that effectively uses programming during the competition. The team should consistently score points during the autonomous period of matches and be ranked near the top of the programming skills rankings. The team should also have clear and complete documentation of programming in their engineering notebook and be able to fully explain their code in the team interview.
- Amaze Award: This award is given to a team with a consistently high-performing robot. An engineering notebook is not required for this award, but the team should be able to explain how they worked together to build and design their robot.
- Build Award: This award is given to a team with a sturdy, safe, and reliable robot. This is often given to the team with the best build quality.
- Create Award: This award is given to a team who uses innovative designs to overcome a challenge rather than simply copying other teams’ designs.
- Judges Award: This is a special award given by judges to a team that does not fit into other award categories but deserves recognition. Judges often give this award to a team that demonstrates strong teamwork and perseverance in overcoming a challenge. Starting in the 2022-2023 season the Judges Award is now required at all events with judging.
- Energy Award: This award is given to a team who shows enthusiasm and passion for robotics throughout the entire event.
- Inspire Award: This award is given to a team who inspires the judges and other teams with their respectfulness and positive attitude during the competition.
- Sportsmanship Award: This award is given to a team who exhibits strong sportsmanship throughout the entire competition.

=== VEX Robotics World Championships ===
The REC Foundation had hosted the VEX Robotics World Championship each year until 2026. The VEX Robotics World Championship is the highest level of competition in VEX Robotics and the final competition of each season. This event has been awarded by the Guinness World Records as the largest robotics competition in the world in 2018 with 30,000 attendees from 70 countries. In 2021, the VEX Robotics World Championships was awarded the title of the largest online robotics championship with 12,693 attendees. A new game is revealed at the conclusion of each World Championships to mark the start of the next season.

== Other Programs ==
=== Girl Powered ===
The REC Foundation’s Girl Powered program sponsored by Google aims to increase girls’ access to STEM and robotics. Any teacher, coach, or Event Partner can host a Girl Powered Workshop. The REC Foundation also released a Girl Powered pledge for people to show their support for the program.

=== Aerial Drone Competition ===
The REC Foundation manages a drone competition for students in grades 5-12 known as the Aerial Drone Competition. The Aerial Drone Competition challenges teams' teamwork, programming skills, drone piloting abilities, and communication.

The Aerial Drone Competition has many similarities with the VEX Robotics Competition. Like the VEX Robotics Competition, a new "mission" is released each year, containing challenges that teams must complete using their drones. The judging aspect of the Aerial Drone Competition involves an interview and a review of the team's logbook for a chance to win awards. At the end of each season, the best teams compete in Championships around the nation.

=== TSA VEX Robotics ===
In addition to the normal competition season, the REC Foundation partners with the Technology Student Association (TSA), a nation-wide middle and high school technology competition, to host Vex Robotics competitions that align with the TSA competition cycle. Rather than competing in the VEX Robotics World Championships, qualifying TSA VEX Robotics teams compete at the TSA National Conference against other TSA teams. The TSA VEX Robotics Competition also has additional requirements to comply with the general TSA Competition Guidelines. These include a 20-point deduction from the Excellence Award score for violating the TSA dress code and a maximum of 6 competitors per team.

=== Online Challenges ===
The REC Foundation hosts a variety of online challenges for VEX Robotics competitors meant to help extend learning beyond the competition field. Winners of online challenges may receive a variety of awards including qualification to the VEX Robotics World Championships, merchandise from sponsors, and recognition during the opening and closing ceremonies of the VEX Robotics World Championships.

The online challenges offered each season vary based on sponsorship. Online challenges typically cover a variety of topics including career readiness, community service, gender equality, student advocacy, Chinese cultural exchange, as well as more creative challenges such as poster design and photography.

=== Scholarships, Internships, and Alumni Association ===
The REC Foundation partners with 80+ universities and organizations to provide scholarships for students who are participants of REC Foundation programs. Many of these organizations and universities are invited to set up booths at the VEX Robotics World Championships each year. Sponsors of the REC Foundation such as Google, NASA, and Tesla also partner with the REC Foundation to promote internship opportunities to program participants.

Former participants over the age of 18 are invited to join the REC Foundation Alumni Association, meant to help program alumni stay connected to potential volunteering opportunities, internships, and more.
