= Thien Pham =

Graphic novelist

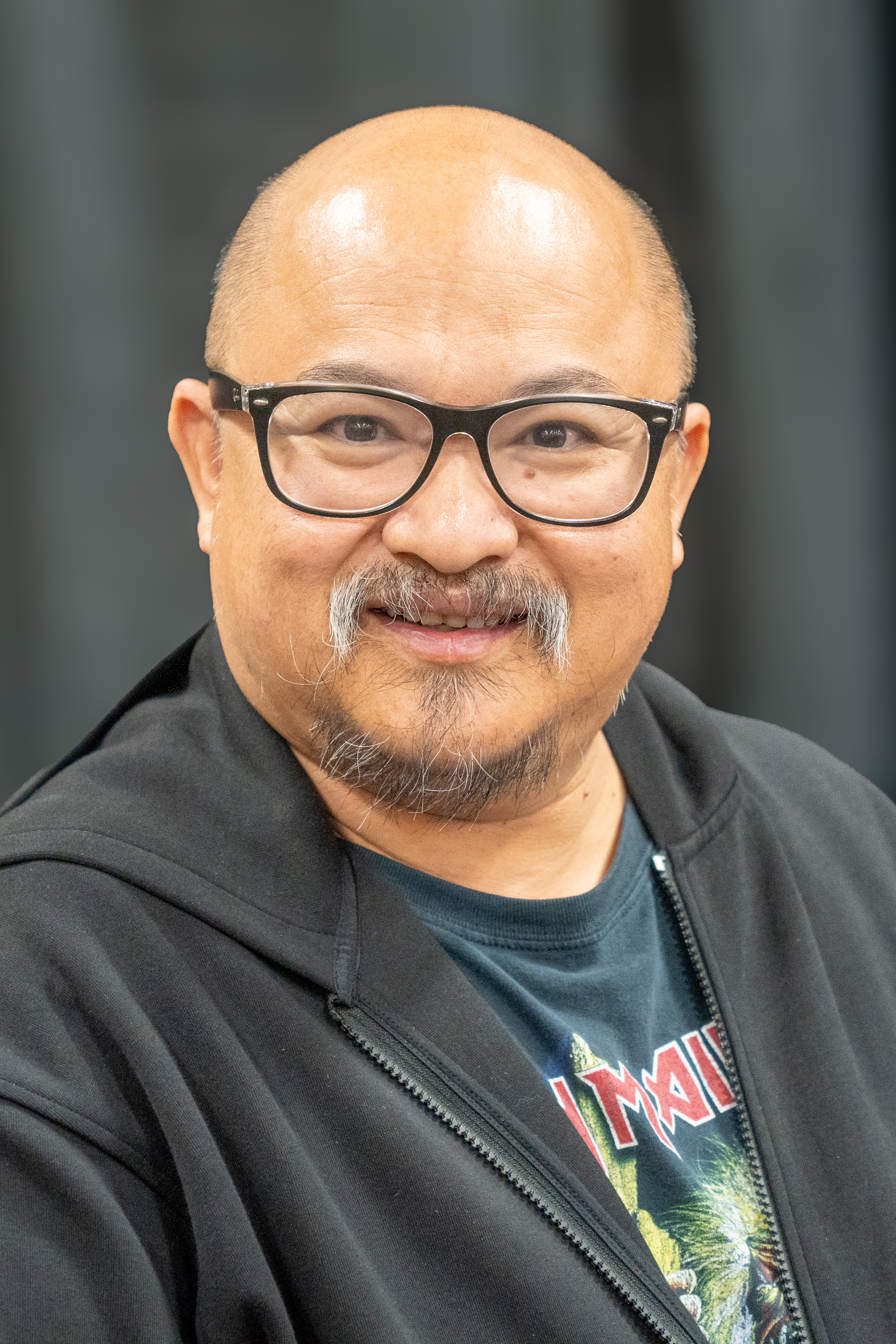
Pham at Comic Con Oakland 2026

Thien Pham is a cartoonist, illustrator, and educator based in Oakland, CA. Pham is best known for his graphic memoir Family Style: Memories of an American from Vietnam (2023). Pham currently teaches art in the Visual and Performing Arts Department at Bishop O’Dowd High School and has taught there since 2002.

Born in Vietnam, Pham and his family fled to a refugee camp in Thailand in 1979 and immigrated to the United States in 1984. Pham lived with his family in San Jose, CA, and he made minicomics in the 2000s. In 2011, Pham illustrated Level Up, a graphic novel written by Gene Luen Yang. Level Up was nominated for an Eisner Award in 2012. Pham published the graphic novel Sumo in 2012 and the graphic memoir Family Style: Memories of an American from Vietnam in 2023. In 2024, Family Style was a finalist for the YALSA Award for Excellence in Nonfiction and won the Eisner Award for Best Graphic Memoir.

Pham collaborates with KQED food editor Luke Tsai on "The Midnight Diners," an illustrated restaurant review column. Tsai and Pham's "The Midnight Diners" was nominated for a James Beard Media Award in 2025. Pham is dubiously known as the Comics Laureate of Oakland.

== Published Works ==
- Level Up (2011) with Gene Luen Yang: A graphic novel about video games, family, and a medical student.
- Sumo (2012): A graphic novel about a former football player who moves to Japan and trains to become a sumo wrestler.
- Family Style: Memories of an American from Vietnam (2023): A graphic memoir about Pham's experience immigrating to the United States at a young age. Each chapter is named after a significant food in Pham's life.
