= VEX Robotics =

Robotics competition program for students

VEX Robotics is a robotics program for elementary through university students, and a subset of Innovation First International. The VEX Robotics competitions and programs were overseen by the Robotics Education & Competition Foundation (RECF) until May 2026, when VEX split from the foundation and created the Global Robotics & Science Foundation (GRSF) to oversee competition. VEX Robotics Competition was named the largest robotics competition in the world by Guinness World Records.

There are five leagues of VEX Robotics competitions designed for different age groups and skill levels. The VEX V5 Robotics Competition (V5RC), the largest, is targeted toward middle and high school students. The VEX IQ Robotics Competition (VIQRC) is targeted toward elementary and middle school students. The VEX AI Robotics Competition is a 'spinoff' for high school and college-level students. The competition features no driver control periods, hence the name 'VEX AI'. VEX U is a robotics competition for university students. The game is similar to V5RC, but traditionally features a unique ruleset with more relaxed rules on the construction of their robots, and teams consisting of two robots.Last there is VEX Drone which is a competition similar to VEX U.

In each of the four competitions, the VEX Robotics Game Design Committee creates a new challenge annually. Students must then design, build, program, and drive a robot to complete the challenge as best they can within the constraints. After competing in local and regional tournaments, qualifying teams are invited to attend the VEX Robotics World Championship.

The description and rules for the season's competition are released during the world championship of the previous season. From 2021 to 2025, the VEX Robotics World Championship was held in Dallas, Texas each year in mid-April or mid-May, depending on which league the teams are competing in. St. Louis, Missouri hosted the event in 2026 and is scheduled to hold the RECF STEM World Championship in 2027. VEX Robotics and the GRSF have announced that the 2027 VEX Robotics World Championship will be held in Las Vegas, on April 23 through April 30, 2027.

== VEX V5 ==
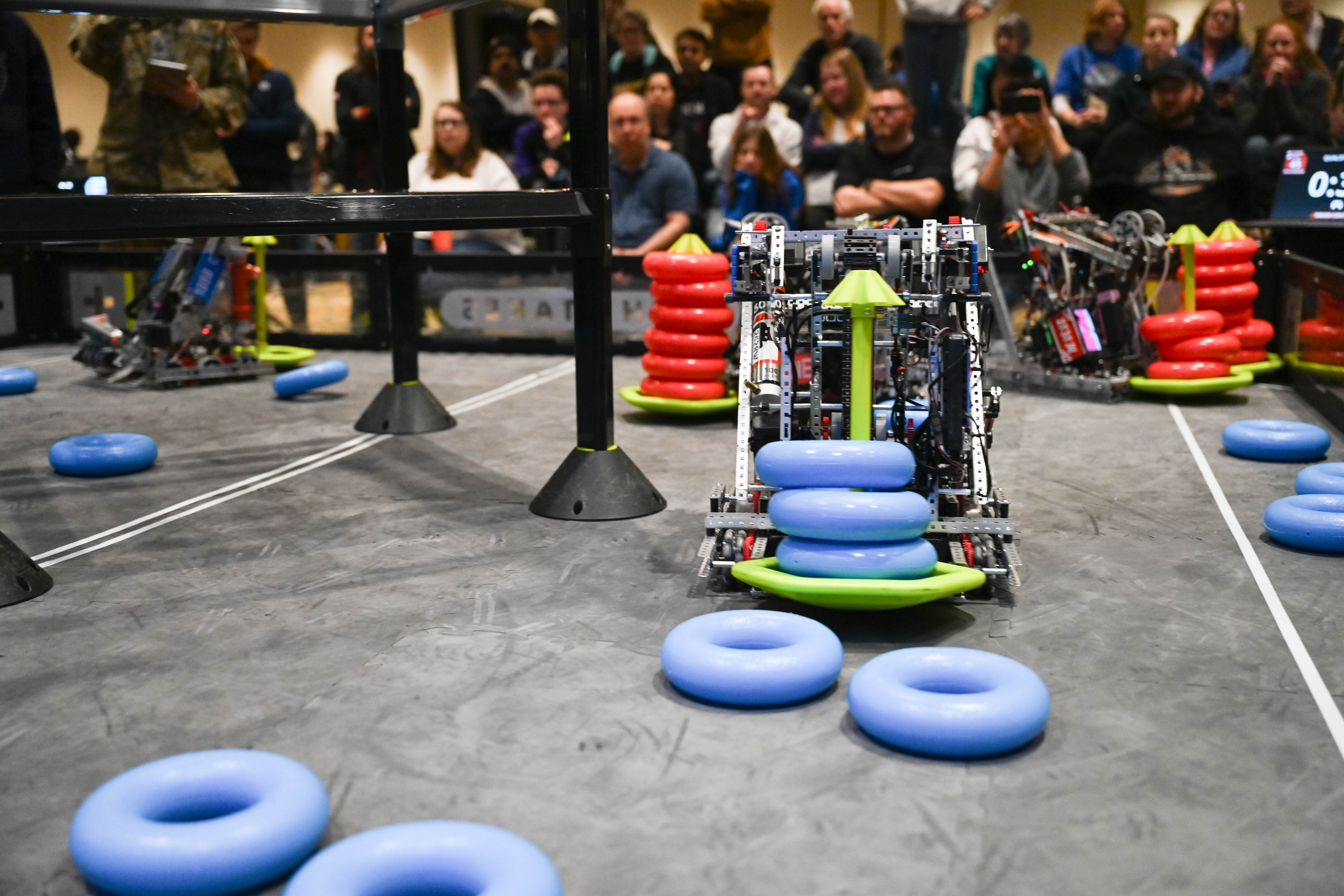
A robot built using the VEX V5 system is driven during the 2024-25 V5RC competition season, High Stakes.

VEX V5 is a STEM learning system designed by VEX Robotics and the REC Foundation to help middle and high school students develop problem-solving and computational thinking skills. It was introduced at the VEX Robotics World Championship in April 2019 as a replacement for a previous system called VEX EDR (VEX Cortex) (Note: VEX V5 replaced EDR due to upgrades in RAM, processing, and hardware.). The program utilizes the VEX V5 Construction and Control System as a standardized hardware, firmware, and software compatibility platform. Robotics teams and clubs can use the VEX V5 system to build robots to compete in the annual VEX V5 Robotics Competition.

=== Construction and Control System ===
The VEX V5 Construction and Control System is a metal-based robotics platform with machinable, bolt-together pieces that can be used to construct custom robotic mechanisms. The robot is controlled by a programmable processor known as the VEX V5 Brain. The Brain is equipped with a color LCD touchscreen, 21 hardware ports, an SD card port, a battery port, 8 legacy sensor ports, and a micro-USB programming port. Usage with a VEX V5 Radio enables wireless driving and wireless programming of the brain via the VEX V5 Controller. The controller allows wireless user input to the robot brain, and two controllers can be daisy-chained if necessary. Each controller has two hardware ports, a micro-USB port, two 2-axis joysticks, a monochrome LCD, and twelve buttons. The controller's LCD can be written wirelessly from the robot, providing users with configurable feedback from the robot brain. The VEX V5 Motors connect to the brain via the hardware ports and are equipped with an internal optical shaft encoder to provide feedback on the rotational status of the motor. The motor's speed is programmable but may also be altered by exchanging the internal gear cartridge with one of three cartridges of different gear ratios. The three cartridges are 100 rpm, 200 rpm, and 600 rpm.

=== VEXcode V5 ===
VEXcode allows students to drive hardware and display graphics within the VEX V5 construction system.

VEXcode V5 is a Scratch-based coding environment designed by VEX Robotics for programming VEX Robotics hardware, such as the VEX V5 Brain. The block-style interface makes programming simple for elementary through high-school students. VEXcode is consistent across VEX 123, GO, IQ, and V5 and can be used to program the devices from each. VEXcode allows the block programs to be viewed as equivalent C++ or programs to help more advanced students transition from blocks to text. This also allows easy interconversion between text-based and block-based programming. VEXcode also lets students code in C++, which gives the opportunity to learn basic C++, but to collect data from sensors or to move the drivetrain, VEX uses a header file.

=== PROS ===
PROS is a C/C++ programming environment for VEX V5 hardware maintained by students of Purdue University through Purdue ACM SIGBots. It provides a more bare-bones environment for more knowledgeable students that allows for an industry-applicable experience. It has a more robust API that allows for more precise control of the hardware for competition-level uses in V5RC/VEX U. It is based on FreeRTOS.

== VEX V5 Robotics Competition ==
VEX V5 Robotics Competition
- Current season, competition or edition: V5RC Override
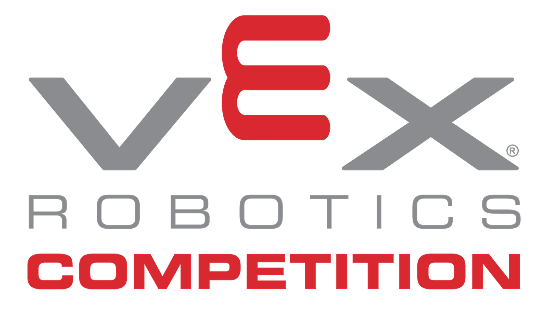
- Sport: Robotics-related games
- Founded: Tony Norman; Bob Mimlitch
- First season: 2007
- No. of teams: Total Registered: 20,000+ V5RC: 11,400; VURC: 300; 50+ countries
- Headquarters: Greenville, Texas
- Most recent champions: 2026 V5RC HS Worlds: World Champions: (United States) 1028A: "WASHED" (United States) 10B: "Exothermic Burnout"; Excellence Award: (United States) 9181C: "C-Channel" 2026 V5RC MS Worlds: World Champions: (United States) 4863A: "APEX" (United States) 10012Y: "Ten Ton Robotics"; Excellence Award: (United States) 7481A: Penguinauts" (Push Back)
- Broadcasters: Livestream.com (2013–present); ESPN2 (2016); CBS Sports (2017); YouTube (2020)
- Website: VEX Robotics Competition

VEX V5 Robotics Competition (V5RC) (formerly the VEX Robotics Competition, VRC, and VEX EDR) is a robotics competition for registered middle and high school teams that utilize the VEX V5 Construction and Control System. Previously under the Robotics Education & Competition Foundation, the competition is now managed by the Global Robotics & Science Foundation.

In this competition, teams design, CAD, build, and program robots to compete in tournaments. At tournaments, teams participate in qualifying matches where two randomly chosen alliances of two teams each compete for the highest team ranking. Before the Elimination Rounds, the top-ranking teams choose their permanent alliance partners, starting with the highest-ranked team, and continuing until the alliance capacity for the tournament is reached. The new alliances then compete in an elimination bracket, and the tournament champions, alongside other award winners, qualify for their regional culminating event. .

The current challenge is VEX V5 Robotics Competition: Override.

=== General rules ===
Middle and high school students have the same game and rules. The most general and basic rules for the VEX V5 Robotics Competition are as follows, but each year may have exceptions and/or additional constraints.

- Each robot is partnered with another robot in a pair called an "alliance". In any given match, each alliance competes against one other alliance. One team is designated as the red alliance, and the other as the blue alliance.
- No robot may exceed the dimensions of an 18-inch cube until the match has begun.
- No robot may contain hardware, software, material, or content that is not distributed by or explicitly allowed by VEX Robotics.
- The playing field consists of a 12-foot by 12-foot square of foam tiles bordered by a wall of metal-framed polycarbonate dividers. Anything outside of these border walls is considered as off of the playing field. The various field elements associated with that season's competition are arranged in a defined and reproducible manner before the start of each match.
- At the start of the match is a 15-second 'autonomous' period, where all four robots navigate the field based on pre-programmed instructions without driver input.
- After the autonomous period has ended, the 'driver control' period begins. This stage of the match consists of one minute and forty-five seconds of manual control of the robot using one or two handheld controllers utilized by the respective number of 'drivers'.
- The object of the match is to attain a higher score, i.e. more points, than the opposing alliance. The method by which the alliances attain these points varies significantly with each season.
- Throughout the match, the blue alliance is not allowed to enter the red alliance's 'protected zone' of the field, and vice versa. The designated areas of the field are often different for each season. During the autonomous period, the protected zone normally consists of half of the field where the alliance starts, whereas the driver control period rarely features a defined protected zone, as was the case for VRC Tipping Point, VRC High Stakes, and VRC Push Back.
- Intentionally removing game objects from the field will result in a warning, minor violation, and/or major violation (disqualification).
- Intentionally and repeatedly damaging any of the robots involved, either during the match or otherwise, will result in immediate disqualification.

=== 2026-2027 Game: Override ===
The objective of Override is to, within a 15 second autonomous period where no human interaction is permitted and a 1 minute 45 second driver control period, score as many points as possible by stacking a combination of pins and cups on goals situated throughout the field.

==== Gameplay and scoring ====
Override is played on a 12 ft × 12 ft field. The field contains 56 cups, 63 pins, nine goals, four toggles, and four loaders. Two alliances, red and blue, each consisting of two teams, compete to score more points than the opposing alliance.

Each scored alliance-colored pin is worth five points, while each scored yellow pin is worth ten points when it is owned by an alliance. The ownership of yellow pins in a quadrant is controlled by the corresponding toggle. Each robot ending the match in the Midfield is worth eight points.

The alliance with the higher score at the end of the 15-second autonomous period receives a 12-point Autonomous Bonus. If the autonomous period ends in a tie, each alliance receives six points.

=== 2025-2026 Game: Push Back ===
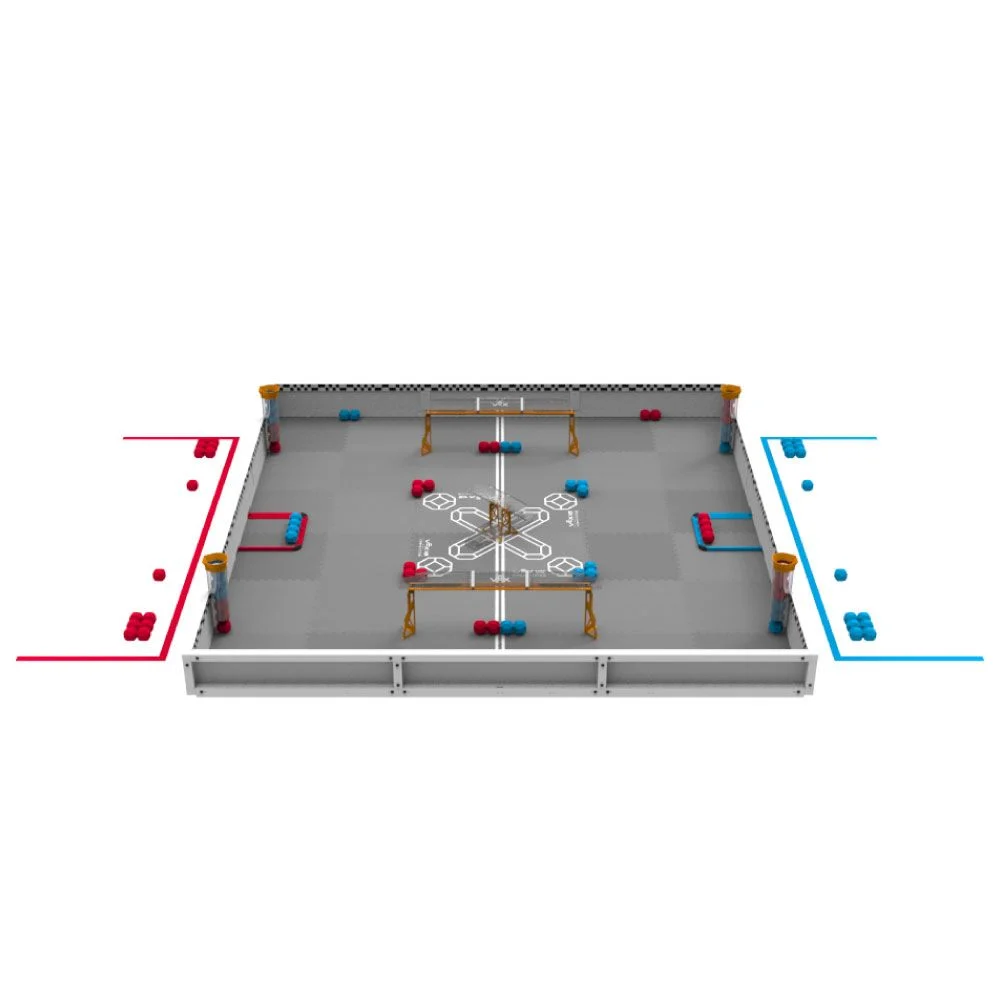
VEX V5 Robotics Competition Field - Push Back

The objective of the game is to score as many blocks as possible in goals within a 15-second autonomous period, and 1:45 driver control period. Each field consists of two long goals, two center goals, four loaders, and two park zones.

==== Field Element - Goals ====
The goals may be pictured as 'tubes ' above the field. Long goals can fit fifteen blocks of any color, while center goals can fit seven. Goals feature control bonuses that are always awarded to the alliance with the most blocks scored in the control zone of each goal. Center goal control zones incorporate the entire goal, with the 'upper center goal' granting an eight-point bonus, and the 'lower center goal' granting a six-point bonus. Long goal control zones incorporate a marked center region of the goal, and grant a ten-point bonus.

==== Scoring ====
Each block considered scored within a goal is worth three points. A block is considered scored within a goal if that block is: in contact with the inside surfaces of a goal; is not in contact with a robot of the same alliance as that block; is not in contact with the floor. At the end of each match, teams may elect to 'park' their robots in a park zone, exclusive to each alliance, and can receive an eight-point bonus if one robot is parked, and a thirty-point bonus if both alliance's robots are parked. The autonomous period winner, the alliance that scores the most points during the 15-second autonomous period, is granted an additional ten-point bonus added to their score .

Skills

In the robot skills challenge the robot must score as many points as possible individually. The rules for skills differs from how match works, for example each block scored is only worth one point instead of three. There is both autonomous and driver skills, where the robot moves autonomously to complete tasks while in driver the robot is manually controlled by a driver, the skill score is calculated by taking your best autonomous and driver skills runs and adding them together. Some more differences include the long goal control bonuses being 5 points each and the middle goal control bonuses being 10 points each. In order to achieve long goal control there must be at least 3 balls of the same color enclosed within the control zone lines and for middle goal control there must be 7 balls of the same color inside the goal. One more difference is that parking, being inside the park zone without touching the surrounding tiles, is worth 15 points while clearing a park zone is also worth 5 points. There are also no match loads in skills and the arrangement of balls differs from the match setup.

==== Champions ====
2026 High School V5RC Champions
	Team Name	Team #
World Champion	WASHED	1028A
World Champion	Exothermic Burnout	10B
Excellence Award	C-Channel	9181C

2026 Middle School V5RC Champions
	Team Name	Team #
World Champion	APEX	4863A
World Champion	Ten Ton Robotics	10012Y
Excellence Award	Penguinauts	7481A

=== 2024-2025 Game: High Stakes ===
The objective of the game is to score as many alliance rings as possible on stakes. Each field consists positive and negative corners, a ladder, five mobile goal stakes, two alliance wall stakes, two neutral wall stakes, and one high stake.

==== Corners ====
There are four 'corners' of the field, two positive corners and two negative corners, 12 x 12 in., each being triangular in shape. Any mobile goal stake can be pushed into any corner, however during the last thirty seconds of a match, positive corners are protected, with neither alliance allowed to interfere, or come into contact with goals considered placed in a positive corner. Positive corners double the worth of the rings, while negative corners subtract ring points from the alliance of the ring(s) color.

==== Field Element - Mobile and Wall Stakes ====
Mobile goal stakes and neutral wall stakes can fit six rings each, and alliance wall stakes can fit two rings of any color. The 'high stake' located on top of the center ladder can fit one ring. Any alliance can score on any stake, however alliance wall stakes, colored to the alliance that can legally score on the stake, are restricted to robots of only one alliance each.

==== Scoring ====
Each ring scored is worth one point, however top rings are worth three points. The autonomous period winner, the alliance that scores the most points in the 15-second period, gains an additional six points which negative corners cannot subtract. Teams cannot have 'negative points' capping the minimum point amount to 0.

==== Champions ====
2025 High School V5RC Champions
	Team Name	Team #
World Champion	Double Play	80001B
World Champion	Jackson Area Robotics	2775V
Excellence Award	Gremlin	5203G

2025 Middle School V5RC Champions
	Team Name	Team #
World Champion	[Vinci] Hard Drive	10102Z
World Champion	Cyber Spacers	3588Y
Excellence Award	HABS_CyberSquad	78116A

=== 2023-2024 Game: Over Under ===
There are sixty Triballs, two goals, and four match load stations on a VRC Over Under Field. The field is divided into two offensive zones by a barrier. Triballs can be Scored in the two Goals, one per Alliance, at opposite sides of the field. Each Triball scored in a Goal is worth 5 points. A Triball scored in the alliance's side of the field is worth 2 points.

At the end of the Match, Alliances will receive points for elevating their robots with their alliance's elevation bar.

==== Champions ====
2024 High School V5RC Champions
	Team Name	Team #
World Champion	Makapaka	55286A
World Champion	Shanghai RuiGuan Team 9123C	9123C
Excellence Award	Pronounce This	2654P

2024 Middle School V5RC Champions
	Team Name	Team #
World Champion	Wolverines	462Z
World Champion	西安市铁一中学	54001B
Excellence Award	Genesis	78181A

=== 2022-2023 Game: Spin Up ===
There are sixty Discs and four Rollers on a VRC Spin Up Field. Discs can be Scored in the two High Goals, one per Alliance, at opposite corners of the field. Each Disc scored in a High Goal is worth 5 points. However, Robots aiming for the High Goal had better be accurate! Because underneath each High Goal, is a 1-point Low Goal for the opposing Alliance.

In addition to Discs, Robots can also spin the four Rollers mounted to the field perimeter. If the area inside of a Roller's pointers only shows one color, that is considered “Owned” by that Alliance. Each Owned Roller is worth 10 points at the end of the match.

At the end of a Match, Alliances will receive a 3-point bonus for each tile their Robots are Covering, excluding the tiles which make up the Low Goals. So, during the last 10 seconds of the Match, there are no horizontal expansion limits.

The Alliance that scores more points in the Autonomous period is awarded with ten bonus points, and each Alliance also has the opportunity to earn an Autonomous Win Point by scoring at least two Discs in Alliance's High Goals, and owning Both Rollers on their side of the field. This Bonus can be earned by both Alliances, regardless of who wins the Autonomous Bonus

==== Champions ====
2023 High School V5RC Champions
	Team Name	Team #
World Champion	Barcbots Getting There	11101B
World Champion	Capten	7686B
Excellence Award	ROBOKAUZ	21417A

2023 Middle School V5RC Champions
	Team Name	Team #
World Champion	Supernova Hydra	3324U
World Champion	Shanghai Ruiguan Team 9123X	9123X
Excellence Award	RoboMonkeys	652A

=== 2021-2022 Game: Tipping Point ===
The object of the game is to attain a higher score than the opposing Alliance by Scoring Rings, moving Mobile Goals to Alliance Home Zones, and by Elevating on Platforms at the end of a Match. Rings scored on mobile goal bases are worth (1 pts).Rings scored on branches are worth (3 pts). Rings scored on high brances are worth (10 pts).

Neutral mobile goals are worth (20 pts) on the ground and (40 pts) when elevated. Colored mobile goals are worth (20 pts) on Correct Alliance’s Home Zone and (40 pts) Elevated on correct Alliance’s Balanced Platform. Robots are worth (30 pts) each for being balanced on the alliance goal.

The autonomous period is worth (6 pts).

==== Champions ====
2022 High School V5RC Champions
	Team Name	Team #
World Champion	PiBotics B	38141B
World Champion	The Cheesy Poofs	254F
Excellence Award	VEXMEN: Pandemic	81P

2022 Middle School V5RC Champions
	Team Name	Team #
World Champion	Royal Robotics 6446C	6446C
World Champion	Robohawks - Century	8838B
Excellence Award	The Misfits	15442C

=== VEX Games ===
2026-2027	2025-2026	2024-2025	2023-2024	2022-2023	2021-2022	2020-2021	2019-2020	2018-2019	2017-2018
Override	Push Back	High Stakes	Over Under	Spin Up	Tipping Point	Change Up	Tower Takeover	Turning Point	In The Zone
2016-2017	2015-2016	2014-2015	2013-2014	2012-2013	2011-2012	2010-2011	2009-2010	2008-2009	2007-2008
Starstruck	Nothing But Net	Skyrise	Toss Up	Sack Attack	Gateway	Round Up	Clean Sweep	Elevation	Bridge Battle

== VEX IQ Robotics Competition ==
VEX IQ Robotics Competition
- Current season, competition or edition: VIQRC Level Up; Level Up
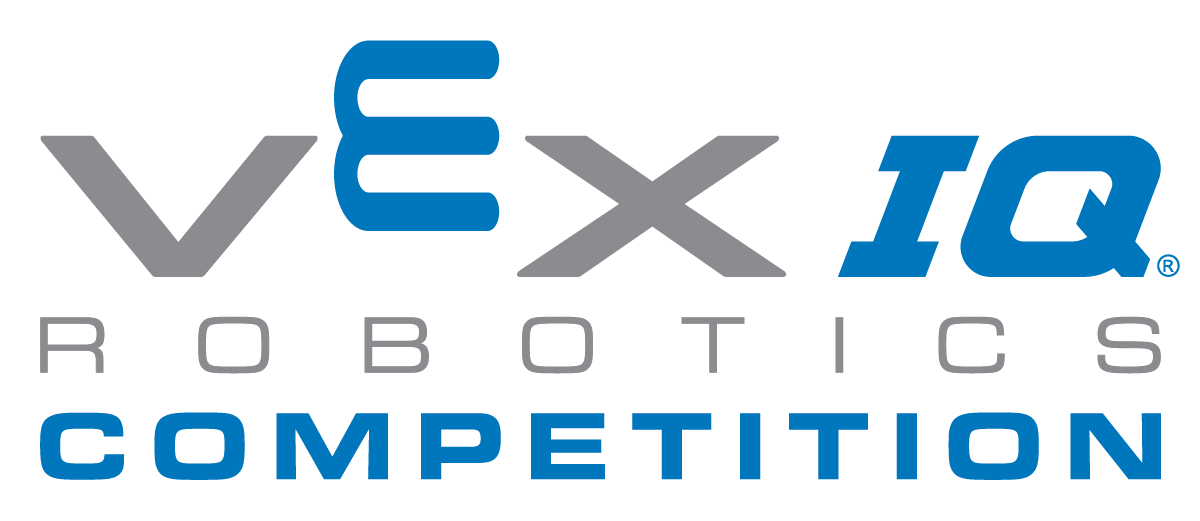
- First season: 2012
- No. of teams: Total Registered: 20,000+ VEXIQ:8,500; 50+ countries
- Headquarters: Greenville, Texas
- Most recent champions: 2026 VIQRC MS Worlds: World Champions: (China) 3287A: "Crazy Lemon" (China) 9296A: "YouthLink"; Excellence Award: (United States) 770Z: " Re-imagine Robotics Zero Gravity" 2026 VIQRC ES Worlds: World Champions: (China) 9919A: "HUA CHUANG Rockets" (China) 98016B: "STEMSTAR-CHRONOS"; Excellence Award: (United States) 34362H: "Natural Disaster" (Mix and Match)
- Broadcasters: ESPN2 (2016); CBS Sports (2017) YouTube (2020-2021)
- Website: VEX IQ Challenge

The VEX IQ Robotics Competition, presented by the Global Robotics & Science Foundation since 2026, provides elementary and middle school students with exciting, open-ended robotics and research project challenges that enhance their science, technology, engineering, and mathematics (STEM) skills through hands-on, student-centered learning. VEX IQ is tailored for grades 5–8. A VEX IQ Robotics set is used with plastic pieces that snap together using pegs, making it easy to construct a robot. Students use a coding software called VEXcode IQ to program the robot. It can be programmed with block-based coding or Python. There are two parts to the contests: Robot Skills, which is a single robot trying to score as many points as possible, and the Teamwork Challenge, where two robots attempt to work together to complete the same task. Usually the rules for skills and match differ from each other.

=== 2026-2027 Game: Level Up ===
Level Up is played on a rectangular 6 foot by 8 foot rectangular field. Two robots compete in the Teamwork Challenge as an alliance in 60-second-long teamwork matches, working collaboratively to score points by scoring beanbags in goals. There are different levels of goals, and higher levels earn more points. Specifically, there are 5 levels each with different scores listed below:

Floor Goal: 1 point

Level 1 Goal: 3 points

Level 2 Goal: 6 points

Level 3 Goal: 12 points

Level 4 Goal: 16 points

=== Previous games ===
==== 2025-2026 Game: Mix and Match ====
VEX IQ Robotics Competition Mix and Match is played on a 6 foot by 8 foot rectangular field. Two robots compete in the Teamwork Challenge as an alliance in 60-second-long teamwork matches, working collaboratively to score points. The goal of the game is to stack pins and beams to score points. The stacks can also be placed inside of goals, corner goals and the center orange goal to maximize points, where the bottom pin in the stack must be the same color as the color of the goal. There are 4 starting goals on the field which when knocked off gets 2 points. Teams will receive bonus points for having multi-coloured stacks of pins, 2-coloured stacks will receive a bonus of 5 points and 3-coloured stacks will receive a bonus of 15 points. There is also a middle standoff pin which any stack on there gets an extra 20 points.

==== 2024-2025 Game: Rapid Relay ====
VEX IQ Robotics Competition Rapid Relay is played on a 6 foot by 8 foot rectangular field configured as seen above. Two robots compete in the Teamwork Challenge as an alliance in 60-second-long teamwork matches, working collaboratively to score points.

Teams also compete in Skills Challenges, where one team tries to score as many points as possible. These matches consist of Driving Skills, where the robots is operated entirely by humans, and Programming Skills, where the robot acts autonomously.

The object of the game is to score yellow, padded nylon balls into a goal on one side of the field, whilst passing it between each of the teamwork partners robots. The goal wall consists of 4 different holes that can be scored into. Each hole contains a 'switch' that is activated when a ball passes through a hole. Each switch can be activated once per match. Once a ball has been scored, it can be picked up by a designated member of the drive team who throws it to a loader on the opposite side of the field. The loader places the ball into the 'loading station', which randomly sends the ball in any direction. 2 balls can be in play at once during the game. In the last 15s of a match, the designated 1st loader can load the balls to a specific zone on the field instead of using the 2nd loader.

VIQRC Rapid Relay Scoring
Action	Points
Ball into any goal	1 point
Switch flipped	1 point
Ball passed from one robot to the other	4 points per switch flipped

==== 2023-2024 Game: Full Volume ====
VEX IQ Robotics Competition Full Volume is played on a six-foot by eight-foot rectangular field. Two robots compete in the Teamwork Challenge as an alliance in 60-second-long teamwork matches, working together to score points.

Teams also compete in Skills Challenges, where one team tries to score as many points as possible. These matches consist of Driving Skills, where the robots is operated entirely by humans, and Programming Skills, where the robot acts autonomously.

The object of the game is to score different sized blocks into one of three goals. The more blocks in a goal, the more points. As well as that, if all the blocks in a goal are the same color (size), then the team(s) get a uniform goal bonus. Teams can get blocks from the supply zone, or get blocks located at specific positions on the field. Teams can also get points for knocking the red blocks off the starting pegs. Teams get points for partial-parking (having part of your robot located in the supply zone at the end of the 60 seconds), or full parking (having all of your robot located inside the supply zone at the end of the 60 seconds).

VIQRC Full Volume Scoring
Each Block Scored in a Goal	1 point
Height Bonus	10 points per fill level
Each Uniform Goal	10 points
Cleared Supply Zone	20 points
Each Red Block Removed from Starting Peg	5 points
Each Partially Parked Robot	5 points
Each Full Parked Robot	10 points
Double Parked Bonus	10 points

==== 2022-2023 Game: Slapshot ====
VEX IQ Competition Slapshot is played on a six-foot by eight-foot rectangular field. Two robots compete in the Teamwork Challenge as an alliance in 60-second-long teamwork matches, working collaboratively to score points.

Teams also compete in the Robot Skills Challenge, where one robot takes the field to score as many points as possible. These matches consist of Driving Skills Matches, which will be entirely driver-controlled, and Programming Skills Matches, which will be autonomous with limited human interaction.

VIQC Slapshot Scoring
Disc Scored in Purple Zone	2 points
Disc Scored in Blue Zone	3 points
Disc Scored in Green Zone	4 points
Disc Scored in Yellow Zone	1 point
Disc Removed from Dispenser	1 point
Contact Bonus	1 extra point per disk in the Goal Zone

The scoring objects in VEX IQ Competition Slapshot are 2.5" (6.35 cm) diameter Discs. There are a total of (45) Discs on the field. The object of the game is to score as many points as possible with an alliance partner by scoring Discs in Goal Zones, removing Discs, and touching Contact Zones at the end of the Match.

==== 2021-2022 Game: Pitching In ====
VIQC Pitching In Scoring
Ball Scored in Low Goal	2 points
Ball Scored in high goal	6 points
Starting Corral Cleared of all Balls	5 points
Low Hanging Robot at end of Match	6 points
High Hanging Robot at end of Match	10 points

VEX IQ Challenge Pitching In is played on a six-foot by eight-foot rectangular field. Two robots compete in the teamwork challenge as an alliance in one-minute-long teamwork matches and a 15-second period of autonomous working collaboratively to score points. Teams also compete in the robot skills challenge, where one robot attempts to score as many points as possible. These matches consist of driving skills matches, which will be entirely driver-controlled, and programming skills matches, which will be autonomous with limited human interaction.

The object of the game is to attain the highest score by scoring balls in either a low-scoring goal or a high-scoring goal in the center of the field. Additional points are scored by clearing the starting corrals of all balls and by parking by hanging on either a low or high bar on either side of the field.

==== 2020–2021 Game: Rise Above ====
VIQC Rise Above Scoring
Base riser	1 point
Stacked riser	1 point
Completed row	3 points
Completed stack	30 points

VEX IQ Challenge Rise Above is played on a six-foot by eight-foot rectangular field. Two robots compete in the teamwork challenge as an alliance in one-minute-long teamwork matches, working collaboratively to score points. Teams also compete in the robot skills challenge, where one robot attempts to score as many points as possible. These matches consist of driving skills matches, which will be entirely driver-controlled, and programming skills matches, which will be autonomous with limited human interaction.

The object of the game is to attain the highest score by scoring risers in the goal. There are a total of 27 risers, nine for each color (orange, purple, and teal).

==== 2019–2020 Game: Squared Away ====
VIQC Squared Away Scoring
Each ball scored in a cube	1 point
Each ball scored on a cube	2 points
Each blue and red cube placed in their respective corner goals	10 points
Each green cube placed on a platform	20 points

VEX IQ Challenge Squared Away is played on a four-foot by eight-foot rectangular field. The scoring objects in are three-inch diameter balls and seven-inch cubes. There are a total of 35 balls and seven cubes on the field. The object of the game is to score as many points as possible with an alliance partner in one of two ways: by scoring balls in or on cubes and by moving cubes to their respective scoring zones.

==== 2018–2019 Game: Next Level ====
VIQC Next Level Scoring
Each Low Scored Hub	1 point
Each High Scored Hub	2 points
Each Bonus Hub removed from the Hanging Structure	1 point
Each Low Scored Bonus Hub	2 points
Each High Scored Bonus Hub	4 points
Each robot Parked underneath Hanging Structure	1 point
Each Low Hanging Robot	2 points
Each High Hanging Robot	4 points

VEX IQ Challenge Next Level is played on a four-foot by eight-foot rectangular field. The object of the game is to attain the highest score by scoring and stacking colored hubs in building zones, removing bonus hubs from the hanging structure, and by parking or hanging on the hanging bar. There are two building zones in the corners of the field. In the middle, there is one hanging structure. There are a total of fifteen hubs, plus two bonus hubs available to be scored in the building zones and one parking zone in the middle of the field.

==== 2017–2018 Game: Ringmaster ====
VIQC Ringmaster Scoring
Each Emptied Starting Peg	5 points
Each Ring scored in the low-scoring goal	1 point
Each Ring scored on a Scoring Post	5 points
Each Ring scored on a Uniform Scoring Post (All the same color)	10 points
Bonus Tray Emptied	20 points

VEX IQ Challenge Ringmaster is played on a four-foot by eight-foot rectangular field. The object of the game is to attain the highest score by scoring colored rings on the floor goal and on posts, by having uniform posts, by emptying starting pegs, and by releasing the bonus tray. There are a total of 28 hexballs available as scoring objects in the game. There are two scoring zones, sixteen low goals, twelve elevated goals, and one bridge on the field.

==== 2016–2017 Game: Crossover ====
VIQC Crossover Scoring
Each Hexball Scored in the Scoring Zone	1 point
Each Hexball Scored in the Low Goal	3 points
Each Hexball Scored in the Elevated Goal	5 points
Having One Robot Parked on the Bridge	5 points
Having Two Robots Parked on the Bridge	15 points
Having All Robots Parked on a Balanced Bridge	25 points

VEX IQ Challenge Crossover is played on a four-foot by eight-foot rectangular field. The object of the game is to attain the highest score by scoring hexballs in their colored scoring zone and goals, and by parking and balancing robots on the bridge. There are a total of 28 hexballs available as scoring objects in the game. There are two scoring zones, sixteen low goals, twelve elevated goals, and one bridge on the field.

==== 2015–2016 Game: Bank Shot ====
VIQC Bank Shot Scoring
Each Ball Scored in the Scoring Zone	1 point
Each Emptied Cutout	1 point
Each Ball Scored in the Goal	3 points
Having One Robot Parked on the Ramp	10 points
Having Two Robots Parked on the Ramp	25 points

VEX IQ Challenge Bank Shot is played on a four-foot by eight-foot rectangular field. The object of the game is to attain the highest score by emptying cutouts, scoring balls into the scoring zone and goals, and by parking robots on the ramp. There are a total of 44 balls available as scoring objects in the game. There is one scoring zone, one goal, one ramp, and sixteen cutouts on the field.

==== 2014–2015 Game: Highrise ====
VIQC Highrise Scoring
Each Cube Scored in the Scoring Zone	A point value equal to the Highrise Height of the same color as the Cube (i.e., if a team builds a Highrise of 3 red Scoring Cubes on the Highrise Base, a red cube in the Scoring Zone is worth 3 points.)

VEX IQ Challenge Highrise is played on a four-foot by eight-foot rectangular field. The object of the game is to attain the highest possible score by scoring cubes in the scoring zone and by building highrises of cubes of the same color on the highrise bases. There are a total of 36 cubes, twelve of each of three colors, available as scoring objects in the game. There is one scoring zone and three highrise bases on the field. Each robot begins a match on one of two starting positions and must occupy a space of less than 13 by 19 by 15 inches.

==== 2013–2014 Game: Add It Up ====
VIQC Add It Up Scoring
A Small BuckyBall Scored in the Floor Goal	1 point
A Small BuckyBall Scored in the Low Goal	2 points
A Small BuckyBall Scored in the High Goal	3 points
A Large BuckyBall Scored in the Floor Goal	3 points
A Large BuckyBall Scored in the Low Goal	5 points
A Scoring Ring that is Filled	5 points
A Large BuckyBall Scored in the High Goal	8 points
A Robot that is Hanging at the end of the match	8 points

VEX IQ Challenge Add It Up is played on a four-foot by eight-foot rectangular field. The object of the game is to attain the highest possible alliance score by scoring small and large BuckyBalls into the floor, low and high goals, filling scoring rings, and having robots hang from the hanging bar at the end of the match. There are a total of 36 small BuckyBalls and four large BuckyBalls available as scoring objects in the game. There are four floor goals, two low goals, two high goals, and four scoring rings, as well as a hanging bar.

==== 2012–2013 Game: Rings-N-Things ====
VIQC Rings-N-Things Scoring
A Ball Scored in a Low Goal	1 alliance point
A Ball Scored in a High Goal	3 alliance points
A Ball Scored in a Scoring Ring	2 alliance points; 1 individual point
A Robot that is parked at the end of match	2 alliance points
A Second Robot parked at the end of match	3 alliance points

VEX IQ Challenge Rings-N-Things was the Pilot Program for the VEX IQ Challenge robotics competition program, which launched in April 2012. The game is played on a four-foot by eight-foot field, surrounded by a 3.5-inch tall perimeter. There are four goals and eight rings into which teams can score 36 balls. The field is divided by the ramp.

== VEX U ==
The VEX U level competition is a robotics competition for college and university students that uses the VEX Robotics hardware and V5 electronics. The rules are nearly identical for this competition as for the VEX Robotics Competition, but VEX U teams are allowed to take advantage of more customization and greater flexibility than other levels (teams are granted the ability to use 3D printers and use raw materials such as sheet metal and wood). This allows VEX U teams to have more customization on their robots and construct mechanisms that cannot be created solely via the VEX Robotics hardware. Also, their robot creation is limited by the need to find effective costs and a restricted development environment in order to model a real-world situation. Additionally, rather than being limited to a robot size of an 18-inch cube, VEX U contestants had the freedom to use up to a 24-inch cube of space for their larger robot and up to a 15-inch cube for their smaller robot (thus, each team builds 2 robots, and competes against another team's two robots).

The VEX U competition, although very similar to the VEX V5 Robotics Competition, has some distinct rules. The autonomous period of VEX U competitions is also longer, lasting thirty seconds versus the fifteen for the VEX Robotics Competition. As a result, the driver control period is shortened to a period of ninety seconds immediately after the autonomous period has been scored, and the autonomous bonus has been awarded to the correct alliance to keep matches at a length of two minutes.

== VEX AI ==
On April 25, 2020, VEX Robotics and the REC Foundation announced a new platform of competitions, the VEX AI Competition. The new platforms will use the VEX V5 Construction and Control System, and registration will be available to high school and college teams.

The competition is fully autonomous and will use an array of new sensors, including the VEX Game Positioning System (VEX GPS); VEX AI microprocessor; VEX AI Vision Sensor with depth perception; VEX LINK, a wireless robot-to-robot communications interface; and the VEX Sensor Fusion Map, a new multi-sensor integration technology which uses sensory data from the robots to render the course in real-time 3D. Each team will build and program two robots. Teams will be able to 3D print and machine parts, use custom electronics, and utilize an unlimited quantity of motors.

The pilot program opened for to university students in the fall of 2020, and following the period high school teams were also allowed to compete after applying and being accepted to join the program. Unlike university participants, only high school teams that show exceptional preparedness and skill are allowed to compete.

== VEX Robotics World Championship ==
The VEX Robotics World Championship brings together qualifying teams from three VEX Robotics programs: the VEX IQ Challenge, VEX V5 Robotics Competition, and VEX AI Competition since 2022. The championship is an international celebration of the robotics community and a final tournament to crown the VEX World Champions in each league. The 2021–25 championships were scheduled to be held in Dallas, Texas, with the 2026 championship taking place in St Louis, Missouri.

A one-hour special version of the 2016 VEX Robotics World Championship aired on ESPN2 in June 2016. CBS aired a one-hour special version of the 2017 VEX Robotics World Championship on June 11.

During the VEX Robotics World Championship, a "Parade of Nations" is held and includes hundreds of students, often dressed in costumes, from more than thirty countries.

The 2020 VEX Robotics World Championship was canceled due to the COVID-19 pandemic. On March 30, 2020, VEX Robotics and the REC Foundation announced they would host the first-ever VEX Robotics Virtual World Celebration on April 25, 2020. The event celebrated the accomplishments of all teams and revealed the 2020–21 VEX Robotics Competition and VEX IQ Challenge. During this event, VEX Robotics and the REC Foundation also hosted a Fantasy Robotics simulation for all levels in the VEX Robotics Program, using statistics from state and qualifying tournaments. On January 20, 2021, the REC Foundation along with VEX Robotics announced that due to the COVID-19 pandemic the 2021 VEX World Championships would be modified to an online fully remote tournament and would also include remote skills matches.

The current world championship title is held by teams 1028A and 10B.

VEX Robotics World Championship Venues
Venue	Location	Years
California State University, Northridge	Northridge, California	2008
Dallas Convention Center	Dallas, Texas	2009–10
ESPN Wide World of Sports Complex	Kissimmee, Florida	2011
Anaheim Convention Center	Anaheim, California	2012–14
Kentucky Exposition Center and Freedom Hall	Louisville, Kentucky	2015–19; 2020 (planned) (Note: Because the 2020 VEX Robotics World Championship was canceled due to the COVID-19 pandemic, a Virtual World Celebration event was held with no in-person attendees.)
VEX Robotics Headquarters	Greenville, Texas	2020
Kay Bailey Hutchison Convention Center	Dallas, Texas	2022–25
America's Center	St. Louis, Missouri	2026
Las Vegas Convention Center	Las Vegas, Nevada	2027

== Role in Pedagogy ==
VEX Robotics competitions have been of interest to educators as a way of stimulating students' interest in hands-on learning, engineering, and computer programming. The Department of Engineering and Technology Education at Utah State University has created a Design Academy with a curriculum for teaching skills through participation in a VEX Robotics Competition. In addition, VEX Robotics provides two other programs aiming to introduce these skills at an early age in the classroom: VEX 123, and VEX Go.

=== VEX 123 ===
VEX 123 is a VEX Robotics program aimed to introduce basic turtle-style programming to young students in kindergarten through second grade. It uses a small round robot with a front, wheels, and an audio speaker (the '123 Robot'), which is programmed to drive around a plastic course using either a handheld wireless programming module (the 'Coder') or a mobile device (not included) with Scratch-based programming software. The course is modular and can be built differently to present different programming challenges. VEX provides multiple pre-prepared STEM Labs designed for different classroom settings, such as language arts and mathematics. The VEX 123 STEM Labs are "designed to provoke STEM thinking and spark creative problem-solving ideas."

=== VEX GO ===
VEX GO is a robotics program that introduces robotics to students in third grade and upwards. GO is designed to be an affordable construction system for teaching the fundamentals of STEM through engaging, collaborative, and hands-on activities that help young students learn coding and engineering concepts.
