= Charles Duncombe, 3rd Earl of Feversham =

British politician

Charles William Slingsby "Sim" Duncombe, 3rd Earl of Feversham DSO (2 November 1906 – 4 September 1963), styled the Hon. Charles Duncombe until 1915 and then Viscount Helmsley until he succeeded his father in 1916, was a British Conservative politician.

== Early life ==
Feversham was the eldest son of Charles Duncombe, 2nd Earl of Feversham, and his wife Lady Marjorie Blanche Eva, daughter of Francis Greville, 5th Earl of Warwick, and was educated at Eton. He succeeded in the earldom in 1916, aged only nine, when his father was killed in the First World War.

== Professional life ==
Feversham took his seat on the Conservative benches in the House of Lords and served under Ramsay MacDonald and Stanley Baldwin as a Lord-in-waiting (government whip in the House of Lords) from 1934 to 1936 and under Baldwin and later Neville Chamberlain as Parliamentary Secretary to the Ministry of Agriculture and Fisheries and Deputy Minister of Fisheries from 1936 to 1939.

Feversham was also a Lieutenant-Colonel in the 13th/18th Royal Hussars and an Honorary Colonel in the Queen's Own Yorkshire Yeomanry and fought in the Second World War, where he was awarded the Distinguished Service Order in 1945.

Feversham was Treasurer of the University of Leeds from 1959 to his death.

During the passing of the Children and Young Persons Act 1963 reference was made to Feversham's experience as a probation officer, and later position as the President of the Association of Probation Officers.

== Personal life ==
Lord Feversham married Lady Anne Dorothy Wood, daughter of E. F. L. Wood, 1st Earl of Halifax, in 1936. The marriage was not a love match; diarist Chips Channon described the ceremony as "hideous" and "cynical". Over the course of their unhappy marriage, both took lovers. They had one daughter:

- Lady Clarissa Duncombe, DL (11 October 1938 – 23 July 2021) m. Nicholas Spencer Compton Collin as his second wife. The couple had two children, Frederick (b. 30 Oct 1967) and Laura (b. 25 Aug 1969). Lady Clarissa served as High Sheriff and Deputy Lieutenant of North Yorkshire. The family lived at Pockley.

Although it was thought an heir to the title might be born, Anne Feversham "was disinclined to endure another pregnancy, not least if it meant forfeiting a hunting season".

== Death ==
Feversham died in September 1963, aged 56. On his death the earldom and viscountcy of Helmsley became extinct while he was succeeded in his junior title of Baron Feversham by his fourth cousin Peter Duncombe. The Countess of Feversham was made an MBE in 1950 and a CBE in 1979. She died in 1995.

Political offices
Preceded by Herwald Ramsbotham	Parliamentary Secretary to the Ministry of Agriculture and Fisheries; 1936–1939	Succeeded by The Lord Denham
Peerage of the United Kingdom
Preceded by Charles Duncombe	Earl of Feversham; 1916–1963	Extinct
Preceded by Charles Duncombe	Baron Feversham; 1916–1963	Succeeded by Peter Duncombe
