= Gordonstoun =

Private school in Duffus, Moray, Scotland

Gordonstoun School

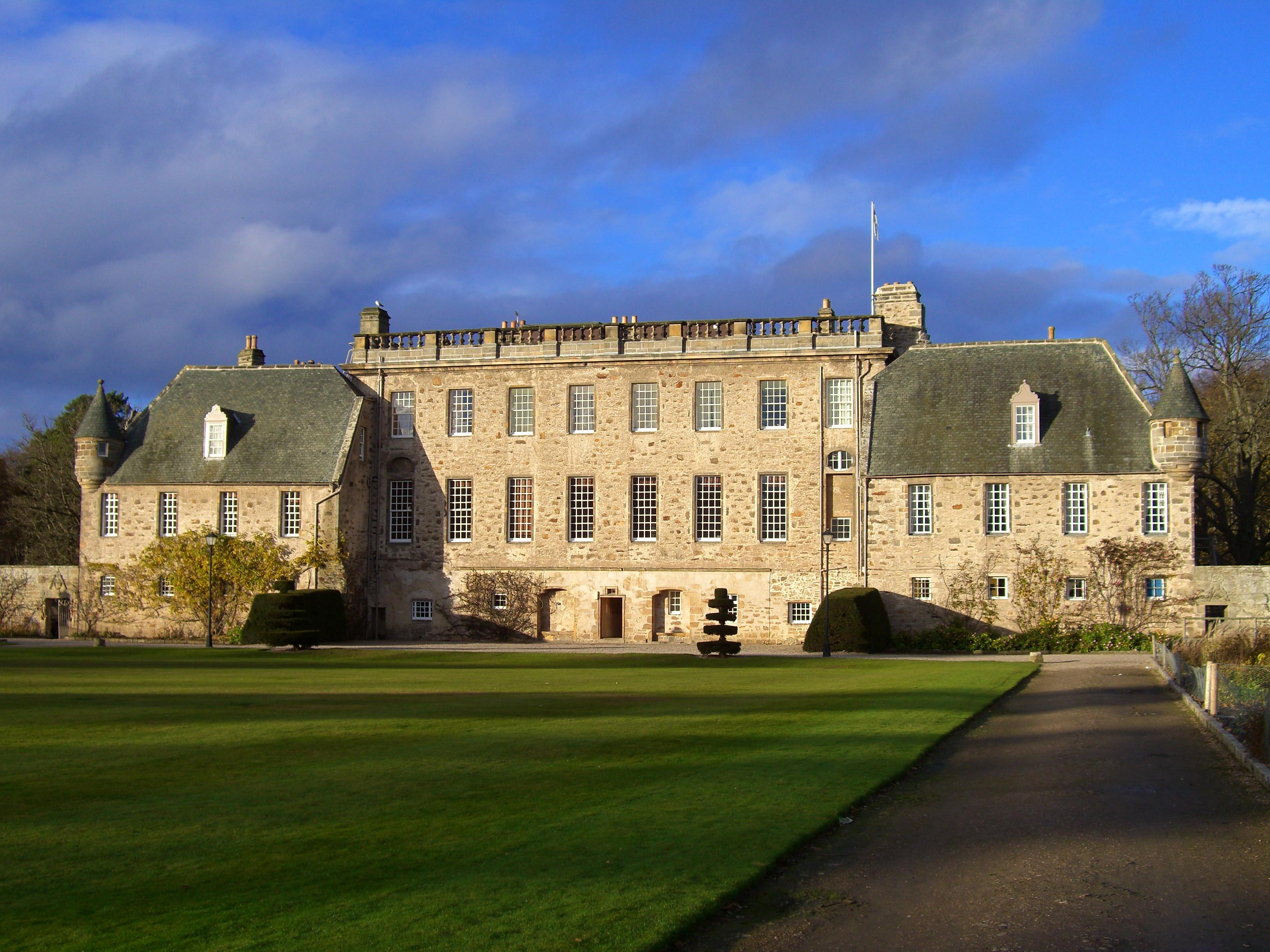
- Gordonstoun House from the South Lawn

Location
- Gordonstoun Road; Duffus, Moray, IV30 5RF; Scotland; 57°42′15″N 3°22′18″W

Information
- Type: Public school Private boarding school
- Motto: Plus est en vous (There is more in you)
- Religious affiliation: Inter-denominational
- Established: 1934; 92 years ago
- Founder: Kurt Hahn
- Principal: Peter Green
- Chaplain: Christian Collett
- Gender: Co-educational
- Age: 4 to 18
- Enrolment: 518
- Houses: 8 boarding
- Colour
- Alumni: Old Gordonstounians
- Website: www.gordonstoun.org.uk

Gordonstoun School (/ˈɡɔːrdənstən/ GOR-dən-stən) is a co-educational private school for boarding and day pupils in Moray, Scotland. Prince Philip, Duke of Edinburgh and his son Charles III attended the school.

It is named after the 150-acre (60-hectare) estate owned by Sir Robert Gordon in the 17th century; the school now uses this estate as its campus. It is in Duffus to the north-west of Elgin. Pupils are accepted subject to an interview plus references and exam results.

It was founded in 1934 as the British Salem School by German-Jewish educator Kurt Hahn based on the model of Schule Schloss Salem, a school he had opened in Germany in 1919. Gordonstoun has an enrollment of around 500 full boarders as well as about 100 day pupils between the ages of 5 and 18. There are seven boarding houses.

Gordonstoun is included in The Schools Index as one of the 150 best private schools in the world and among top 30 senior schools in the UK.

== History ==
=== Founding ===
The British Salem School of Gordonstoun was established in 1934 by Kurt Hahn, a German Jewish educationalist who, after being arbitrarily arrested after the Reichstag fire, fled Nazi Germany. Hahn was asked by friends to give a demonstration in the UK of his "Salem system". He was born in Berlin in 1886 and studied at the University of Oxford. After reading Plato's The Republic as a young man, Hahn conceived the idea of a modern school. With the help of Prince Max of Baden, he set up the Schule Schloss Salem in 1919. After the First World War, both men decided that education was key in influencing the future. They developed Salem to develop its students as community leaders. By the 1930s Salem had already become a renowned school throughout Europe. In 1932, Hahn spoke out against the Nazis and was arrested in March 1933.

He was released and exiled to Britain in the same year through the influence of the prime minister, Ramsay MacDonald, who was familiar with Hahn's work. At the urging of British friends, Hahn decided to start a new school in Morayshire.

Gordonstoun was started in a small way and had financial difficulties in its early years. After the death in 1930 of Sir William Gordon-Cumming, 4th Baronet, his house at Gordonstoun was obtained by Kurt Hahn, whose offer for the lease was accepted on 14 March 1934. The buildings needed repair and renovation, and at the start of the first academic year, the school had only two enrolled pupils. Hahn expected Gordonstoun to operate for only a few years, as an example of his vision. The number of pupils steadily increased, and some additional pupils transferred from Salem, including Prince Philip of Greece, who later became Duke of Edinburgh. By the start of the Second World War, 135 boys were attending.

=== World War II ===
In June 1940 the school was evacuated and the Gordonstoun estate was taken over by the army for use as barracks. The school was relocated temporarily to quarters in Llandinam in Mid Wales when Lord Davies, a father of two pupils, allowed the school to use one of his houses, Broneirion. The buildings were insufficient, and finances and pupil numbers began to drop. In 1941 by Hahn and Lawrence Holt with the support of the Blue Funnel Line, founded Outward Bound, based on the educational approach of Gordonstoun.

The school survived the war, pupil numbers increased again, and the school became well known throughout Wales and the Midlands. Once the war ended, the school returned to the Gordonstoun estate.

=== Post-war years ===
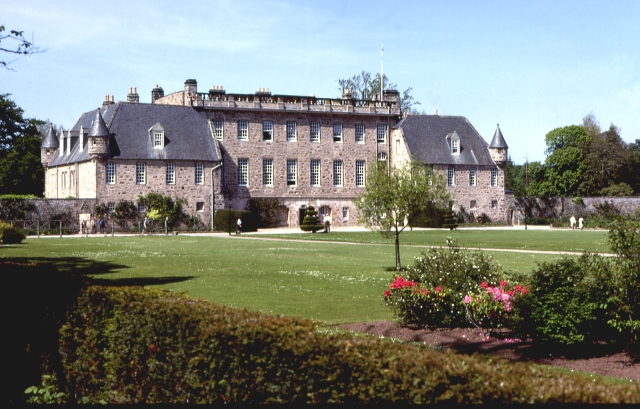
Gordonstoun House as seen from the South Lawn

By the end of 1940, the school achieved its primary target of 250 pupils and continued growing in size. It built dormitories on the estate, removing the need for maintaining a house in Altyre, Forres, many miles away from the main campus. Gordonstoun also developed its academic offerings. It arranged to admit poorer children from the surrounding areas, and to deepen the Outward Bound-type activities that were central to Hahn's system. Skills in mountaineering and seamanship were always taught at the school. The introduction of the Moray Badge, from which the Duke of Edinburgh's Award was borrowed, expanded the types of physical challenges for students to conquer.

From the 1950s onwards, the school administration concentrated on improving the facilities and expanding the curriculum. Major changes since then include: the founding of Round Square in 1966, an international community of schools sharing Hahn's educational ideals; the school becoming co-educational in 1972; and the moving of Aberlour House, Gordonstoun's preparatory school, from Speyside to a purpose-built Junior School on campus in 2004.

Former governor Lisa Kerr took over from Simon Reid as the school's principal in 2016. She was the school's first female principal.

== Overview ==
=== Ethos ===
Gordonstoun's curriculum emphasises an experiential approach, and built upon the work of educationalists, Johann Heinrich Pestalozzi, Johann Friedrich Herbart and John Dewey. However, unlike Herbart and Dewey, who were concerned with the cognitive benefits of out of classroom experiences, Hahn's ethos emphasises the emotional aspects of Herbartianism and Experiential learning.

Hahn established Gordonstoun's ethos during his tenure at Schule Schloss Salem. In a document, written in 1930, Hahn set out what he referred to as the seven laws of Salem;

1. Give the children opportunities for self-discovery.
2. Make the children meet with triumph and defeat.
3. Give the children the opportunity of self-effacement in the common cause.
4. Provide periods of silence.
5. Train the imagination.
6. Make games (i.e., competition) important but not predominant.
7. Free the sons of the wealthy and powerful from the enervating sense of privilege.

Hahn blended outdoor activities and skills such as seamanship and mountaineering with a traditional private school ethos, modelled on his experiences at Eton and Oxford. Plato's The Republic and other elements of ancient Greek history inspired Hahn's approach. This is seen in the title "Guardian", denoting the head boy and girl, the adoption of a Greek trireme as the school's emblem, and a routine that could be described as Spartan.

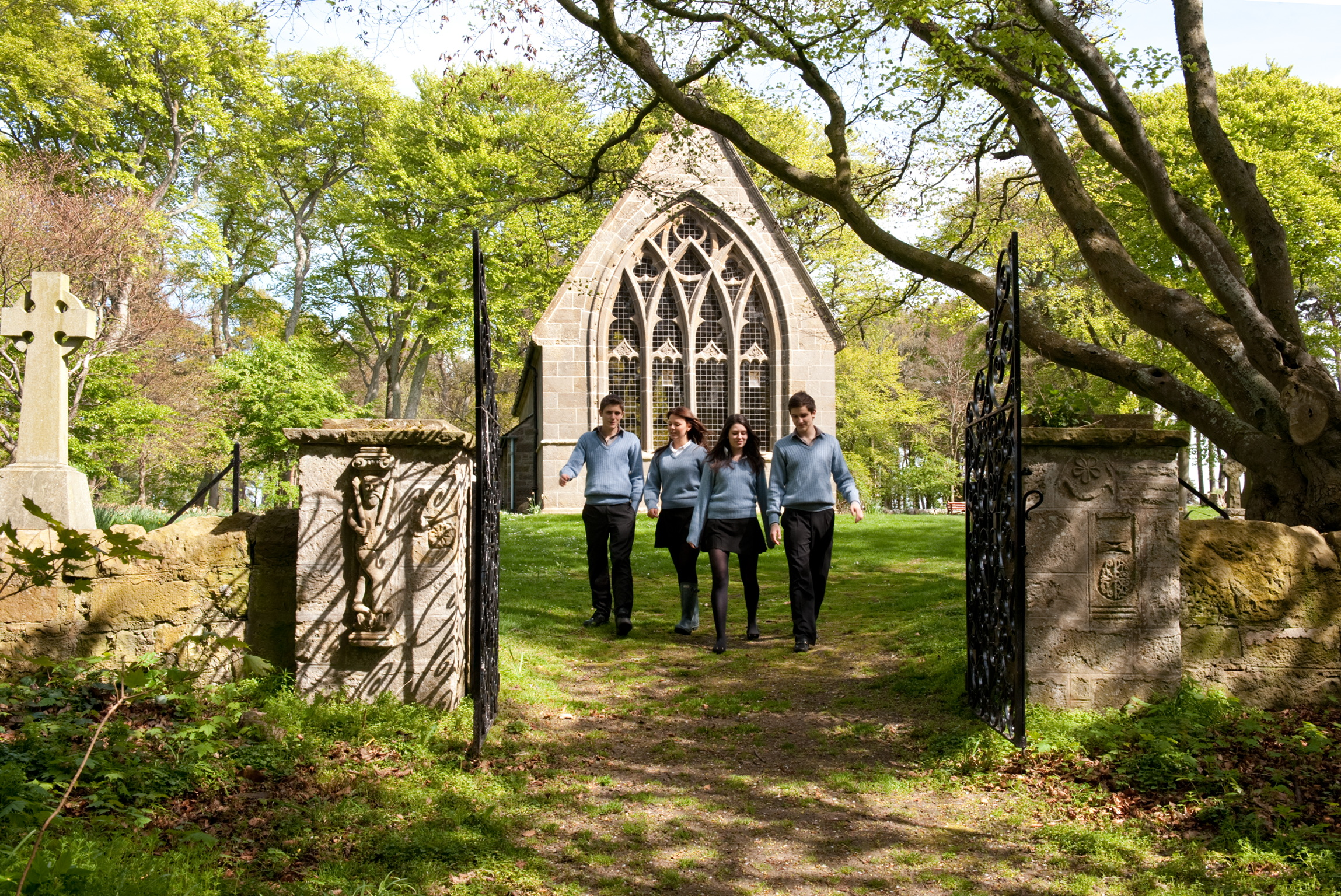
St Michael's Kirk, the chapel within Gordonstoun grounds

Classics, and the Greek ideal that education aims to produce a complete person, intellectually, morally, physically and aesthetically had a profound influence on Hahn. Mostly, he believed that pupils should participate in activities, as opposed to sitting and absorbing information. Therefore, physical education forms much of Gordonstoun's curriculum but achieving personal-goals and overcoming physical challenges take precedent over any competition. As part of their studies, Gordonstoun's students complete something referred to as "The Project" a practical assignment of the student's choosing. The result might be a handmade boat, a restored car or a piece of music. Additionally, there is a chance to join one of the annual international service projects which take pupils abroad to help a foreign community, for instance, there have been projects to build schools in Africa, build wells in Thailand and help orphans in Romania. Hahn believed that an important part of education was to challenge a person and take them out of their areas of familiarity and comfort, improving a person's ability to deal with difficult situations. The school requires that every pupil takes part in a series of outdoor programmes particularly expeditions in the Cairngorms and sailing training on the school's 80-foot (24-metre) vessel, Ocean Spirit. The school had a reputation for challenging conditions, with cold showers and morning runs as a matter of routine. The school still practices periods of silence, intended to give the pupils the space to reflect and glean insights from their experiences. The school no longer practices cold showers or punishment runs, although physical education and challenging outdoor activities are still an integral part of Gordonstoun's identity. Former pupil Charles, Prince of Wales (later King Charles III) had called the school a "Colditz in kilts" alluding to the prisoner-of-war camp Colditz Castle.

Hahn believed that "The Platonic view of education is that a nation must do all it can to make the individual citizen discover his own power and further more that the individual becomes a cripple in his or her point of view if he is not qualified by education to serve the community." The idea of service at the school is thought to encourage students to gain a feeling of responsibility to aid other people and is implemented in creating an array of services to the community in which every student becomes involved (see below).

=== Alumni ===
Gordonstoun has some notable alumni. Two generations of British royalty were educated at Gordonstoun, including Prince Philip and his sons King Charles III and Andrew Mountbatten-Windsor. Rock musician David Bowie sent his son Duncan Jones to Gordonstoun, and Jason Connery, son of actor Sir Sean Connery, also attended. Due to Hahn's influence, the school has had a strong connection with Germany. It is part of the Round Square Conference of Schools, a group of more than 80 schools across the globe based on the teaching of Hahn, and named after the Round Square building at Gordonstoun, where the first conference took place in 1967. Around 30% of students attending Gordonstoun come from abroad.

=== Funding and fees ===
Gordonstoun offers a series of grants, drawing on its investments and other funds, to support pupils who are unable to pay the full fees. In the academic year 2009/10 the school provided financial support for 163 pupils including 11 with 100% fee coverage and 95 with 50% fee reduction. The school is a registered charity: Scottish charity number SC037867. Hahn's views on education centred on the ability to understand different cultures. Gordonstoun incorporates this in a number of ways including its association with Round Square and in offering pupil exchanges to the different schools within the association.

In 2018, Simon Beames, senior lecturer in outdoor learning at the University of Edinburgh, co-published research the effectiveness of Gordonstoun's ethos, and this research has formed an important part of the school's promotional literature. A poll of alumni revealed mixed feelings about Gordonstoun's emphasis on extra-curricular activities. Fifty-seven per cent of the former pupils surveyed agreed that outdoor activities enhanced their academic studies. At the same time, the remaining forty-three per cent felt the activities did not help their studies. However, the research by Beames et al. also found that most former pupils believe the school's emphasis on outdoor activities had a positive effect on their careers.

=== Gordonstoun Schools ===
Along with the main school, two other schools form part of the greater Gordonstoun community. These are Gordonstoun's preparatory school, Aberlour House, and a summer school that serves to promote the school outside of the academic year.

==== Aberlour House ====
The first preparatory school was founded in 1936 at Wester Elchies and unlike Gordonstoun, was not made to move during the war. At the start of the war, there were 40 boys and girls attending, and these numbers increased to the point that a second school was opened at Aberlour House in 1947 by which time nearly 100 pupils were attending.

Wester Elchies was pulled down in the early 1960s because of dilapidation. The prep school continued with just Aberlour, but even so, there were always problems with the 20 miles (32 km) that separated the main Gordonstoun campus and the school. In 2002 the running of Aberlour House was taken over by Gordonstoun, and in 2004 a purpose-built prep school was constructed on the main campus. In January 2007, the disused Aberlour House became the head offices of Walkers Shortbread, whose main factory complex at Fisherton is adjacent to the house.

Presently Aberlour House has approximately 115 pupils between the ages of 6 and 13 attending. Although they form part of the same institution, going to Aberlour is not a prerequisite for going to Gordonstoun and neither is it enforced that pupils at Aberlour House continue on into Gordonstoun. They share the school song, flag and motto with Gordonstoun.

==== International Summer School ====
The Gordonstoun International Summer School started in 1976, and has catered to over 7,000 pupils since then. Around 250 children from all over the world between the ages of 8 and 16 attend each year.

=== Active revision programme ===
The school runs a revision programme over the Easter Holidays, based on the belief that exercise improves cognition. Gordonstoun designed the programme for GCSE students, and it combines revision in English, mathematics and science with periods of gentle exercise and restricted access to electronic devices. The school also claims to serve a diet which promotes brain health throughout the programme.

=== Academic curriculum ===
Entrance to Gordonstoun requires the pupil to pass the Common Entrance Examination. In the Junior School (ages 8–13), pupils study a range of courses and follow the Scottish education system. In the Senior School (ages 13+) the pupils complete a year's foundation course and then enter into the English education system by starting a two-year GCSE course followed by a two-year A Level course. Gordonstoun offers 21 GCSE courses, 27 AS Level courses and 21 A Level courses including specialised subjects such as Dance, Classical Studies and Further Mathematics.

The 2019 Education Scotland inspection of Gordonstoun rated the school as 'outstanding' and 'sector-leading'

The 2009 HMIE inspection evaluated Gordonstoun as being 'Excellent' in its curriculum.

96% of pupils proceed to higher education with 79% going to British universities and 17% to universities abroad. Of those who do not go on to further education, many take gap years or join the armed forces.

== Activities ==
=== Sports ===
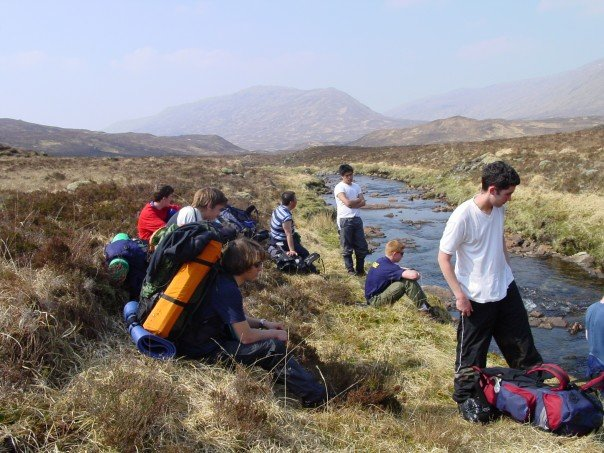
Gordonstoun pupils take a rest while on expedition in the Cairngorms.

In the beginning, Hahn expressed his view that at many schools, ball games had been given precedence over other activities and so, to start with, more focus was placed on seamanship and practical work than the playing of games. Due to this, competitive matches did not start until 1935 when Gordonstoun played and won its first rugby match against Grantown Academy. Even so, the school was still in its infancy, and there were no designated fields on which to play with conditions being so bad that during pre-match, half-time and post-match, players would clear as many pebbles off the field of play as possible. 1935 saw Gordonstoun's cricket team win two, lose two and draw one. Hahn set up the hockey team personally, with Prince Philip humorously recalling a game against Elgin Academy's ladies' team and saying that he "hoped that soon we shall be among the best Scottish girls' teams."

As of 2013 there were playing fields for rugby, football and cricket as well as an outdoor hockey AstroTurf, outdoor tennis courts and a 400 m running track. There is also a sports centre with facilities that include a rock climbing wall, a 25 m swimming pool, a weights room, squash courts and an indoor activity hall for basketball, badminton and netball. Karate, horse riding, skiing, .22 rifle shooting and clay pigeon shooting, athletics, golf and other sports are also available.

==== Football ====
The 1st XI participate in four different competitions. The main competition is the County Schools League where Gordonstoun plays alongside nine other schools in a league system with the chance of promotion/relegation at the end of the season. The other three are Scottish Cup, North of Scotland Cup and the Scottish Independent Schools Cup where Gordonstoun plays with a mixture of independent and state schools.

=== Service ===
The school's fire service works with the Scottish Fire and Rescue Service and has a fire station on campus with two fire-fighting appliances at their disposal. It was started in 1940 while the school was based in Wales and they acquired an appliance soon after. They attend roughly fifty call-outs a year and so members have to be medically and physically fit, training to pass the practical test before becoming fire fighters. The team is split into three watches lasting a week each and are on call 24 hours a day having to carry pagers and react quickly should they be called. In the 70s girls at the School were the first female firefighters in the UK since WW2

=== Seamanship ===
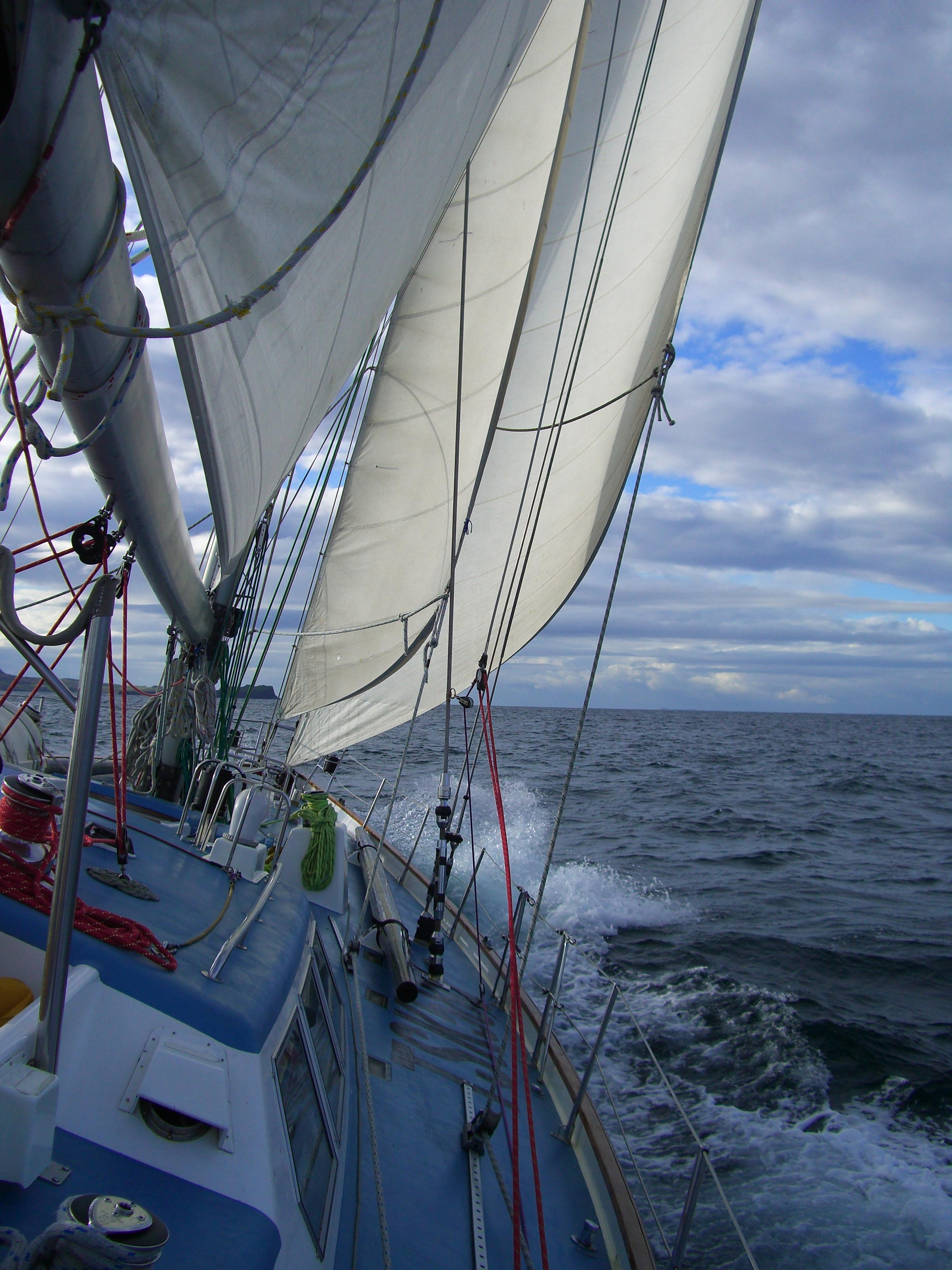
Gordonstoun School's yacht: The Ocean Spirit of Moray under sail in the Irish Sea

Seamanship has been a main part of the curriculum since the school began. The first voyage of note was in a cutter from Hopeman to Dornoch in June 1935, a distance of 25 miles (40 km). Pupils still train in cutters from the age of 13 upward at Hopeman Harbour to prepare for a voyage in the school's 80 ft (24 m) sailing vessel. Most excursions take a week sailing off the West Coast of Scotland, but the school also enters into the Tall Ships' Races annually which allows pupils to take part in an international competition in European waters lasting up to a month.

=== Robotics ===
The school has a VEX Robotics team.

== Prefects ==
In the lower school, ages 13 to 16, a boy and a girl in the sixth form (ages 16 to 18) are elected to be Captains of the lower school. They provide liaison between teachers and pupils so that any concerns can be rectified. Other roles can include organising inter-house activities, charitable events and the lower school social ("social" refers to social event or party).

In the Upper School, ages 16 to 18, responsibility is available through a hierarchy of positions. This starts with Captains of Sports, Service and House. In the case of Captains, no peer voting takes place, but rather a pupil is appointed by the Head of the respective department. This way it is not uncommon for some people to be re-appointed as Captain for multiple terms depending on whether or not anybody else of suitable stance is available. Captains of Sport such as the Football or Rugby Captain are chosen by the Head of that sport and will help the Head organise teams for practice and preparation off the field of play as well as on it. Similarly, Captains of Service will aid the Head of Service to organise training sessions and be a point of contact for the rest of the members.

Colour Bearers get their name from a band of purple they wear as insignia on their uniform, purple being one of the school's colours. They are elected by the pupils and the staff, similar to Eton's Pop, and have important roles in the school community as a whole. Unlike captains they keep their positions for a whole year unless they are demoted as a punishment for untoward behaviour. They meet every week with the Headmaster to attend to a wide range of school matters. As well as this they are responsible for minor roles which would otherwise be taken up by teaching staff such as, maintaining the refectory and the library and for serving drinks behind the bar at the weekly socials in addition to organising major school wide events that take place throughout the year.

From the CBs a boy and a girl are chosen to be Guardians for the academic term. These are the Head Pupils for the entire school and only normally 6 people a year are allowed to have this position. The term Guardian comes from the name of the supportive rulers of Plato's ideal state.

== Boarding houses ==
There are seven boarding houses ranging from year 9–13, one sixth-form house, nine including the one no longer in operation, on the campus. The houses are run by a small team of teachers. The House Master (HM) has overall responsibility and is helped by the Assistant House Master (AHM). Either or both of these will be present at the daily house meeting and will oversee homework to make sure pupils are studying. The HM will organise any special house events, decide who the house captain will be for the term as well as choosing a captain to take care of other house related activities. The HM is also the person who most pupils would talk to if they had a problem although all teachers are available for help. Both the HM and the AHM normally have residences within the houses and so are very much part of the house. Each house has a matron who helps the pupils through their daily routine as well as a tutor to help the pupils in their studies. The year a pupil is in, and the number of rooms in the house decides which pupils are allowed a room of their own, although it is normally decided that younger years share whilst senior pupils get their own rooms. All pupils rotate rooms each term.

The houses are:

=== Female ===
- Hopeman House
- Plewlands House
- Windmill Lodge

=== Male ===
- Altyre House (pre-2016)
- Bruce House
- Cumming House
- Duffus House
- Gordonstoun House (G-House; sixth-form only) (pre-2018)
- Round Square

Some houses will go on house expeditions and there are many inter-house competitions that take place in the year. These competitions vary. The most common are sports such as basketball and football or simply a tug of war. All of the boarding houses throw a themed party annually, and pupils may invite guests from other houses.

== Old Gordonstounians ==
For OGs there is the Gordonstoun Association which aims to promote and strengthen links between former pupils of the school and the school itself. The patron of the GA is King Charles III. The position was previously held by Prince Philip, Duke of Edinburgh.

=== British royal family ===
During the 1960s, Charles, Prince of Wales (later King Charles III) attended the school on the recommendation of his father, Prince Philip, Duke of Edinburgh, who had been one of the first pupils to attend Gordonstoun, having previously been educated at Salem in Germany. Prince Charles did not enjoy the regime, which he later characterised as "Colditz in kilts", but said it taught him self-discipline and responsibility. Andrew Mountbatten-Windsor and Prince Edward followed in their father's and elder brother's footsteps. Of the four princes, three (Philip, Charles and Edward) were appointed Guardian (Head Boy) during their time at the school. Princess Anne, Philip's only daughter, was not educated at Gordonstoun, which at that time was for boys only, but she sent her two children, Peter and Zara, while also serving for some time on the school's board of governors.

=== Royalty and aristocrats ===
- Charles III
- Alexander, Crown Prince of Yugoslavia
- Prince Philip, Duke of Edinburgh
- Andrew Mountbatten-Windsor
- Prince Edward, Duke of Edinburgh
- Peter Phillips
- Zara Tindall
- Nicholas Alexander, 7th Earl of Caledon
- James Carnegie, 3rd Duke of Fife
- Alexander Douglas-Hamilton, 16th Duke of Hamilton
- Jasper Duncombe, 7th Baron Feversham
- Christopher Finch-Hatton, 16th Earl of Winchilsea
- Granville Gordon, 13th Marquess of Huntly
- John Grant, 13th Earl of Dysart
- Paul-Philippe Hohenzollern
- Norton Knatchbull, 3rd Earl Mountbatten of Burma
- Prince Paul Wossen-Seged Makonnen, Duke of Harar
- Angus Montagu, 12th Duke of Manchester
- Lord Ivar Mountbatten
- Michael Pearson, 4th Viscount Cowdray
- Claus-Casimir of Orange-Nassau count of Orange-Nassau, member of the Dutch royal family
- Jonathan Harmsworth, 4th Viscount Rothermere chairman and controlling shareholder of the Daily Mail and General Trust

=== Other Old Gordonstounians ===
Other OGs are listed in List of people educated at Gordonstoun.

In addition to the royal family other notable alumni include:

- Peter Zinovieff – British composer, musician and inventor
- Adrian Utley – Musician Portishead
- William Boyd – writer
- Oona Chaplin – actress
- Jason Connery – actor
- Balthazar Getty – actor and heir to the Getty oil fortune
- Dick Heckstall-Smith – musician
- Caroline Johnson – Conservative Member of Parliament
- Duncan Jones (formerly known as Zowie Bowie) – film director and son of musician David Bowie
- Luca Prodan – musician
- Lara Breay – film producer
- Heather Stanning OBE – Army Officer and ex profesional rower (double Olympic champion, double World champion)
- Roy Williamson – musician, member of the Corries, writer of "Flower of Scotland".
- Jamie Muir - King Crimson percussionist, painter
- Rosalind Eleazar - British actress

Lara Croft, the fictional heroine of Tomb Raider, was supposed to have attended the school in sixth year; she has also been used to advertise it.

== Controversies ==
In 2010, a teacher had their teaching licence/qualification revoked by the General Teaching Council for Scotland for warning students about exam content in advance of the tests.

In 2020, the school carried out renovations which included work on principal Lisa Kerr's living quarters. An unnamed source claimed that the renovations cost approximately £100,000 and included £8,000 for carpets and £6,000 for flooring. Speaking to the Times, the school confirmed that Kerr "contributed significantly" to the costs and that the renovations had "become urgent in order to reconfigure classrooms and increase cleaning regimes to comply with Covid regulations".

=== Child abuse ===
In 2017, Gordonstoun was named as one of the schools being investigated in the Scottish Child Abuse Inquiry chaired by Lady Smith. In 2021 Gordonstoun said at the inquiry that there had been 11 cases of pupil abuse and 82 claims of bullying between students, particularly in the 1970s and 1980s. In 1995 the school had started a child protection policy and in 2013 there had been "significant" abuse disclosures. The school issued a "sincere and unreserved apology" to pupils who had undergone abuse.

In 2018, ex-teacher Andrew Keir was convicted of offences including indecent assault involving thirteen-year-old pupils at the school between 1988 and 1991. He was subsequently jailed for twelve months. In June 2024 an inquiry ruled that abuse took place at the school unchecked for decades. Lady Smith, chairwoman of the Scottish Child Abuse Inquiry (SCAI), said "I have no difficulty in finding that children were abused at Gordonstoun and Aberlour in a variety of ways over a long period of time."

== In popular culture ==
=== True Stories ===
In 1996, the school appeared on an episode of Channel Four's True Stories. Filmmaker Penny Woodcock shot the documentary during the autumn term. Despite preconceptions that Gordonstoun was one of Britain's stricter boarding schools; Woodcock's documentary depicted a compassionate and liberal institution led at that time by the headteacher Mark Pyper. The programme gave insights into the school's management, conflict resolution processes and day-to-day life. Highlights included pupils using a modified Walkman to trigger amplified toilet flushes during the daily sermon, and a candid interview with the school's sailing instructor.

=== The Crown ===
In December 2017, a fictionalised depiction of the school featured in episode 9 of season 2 of the Netflix TV series The Crown. Left Bank Pictures filmed ten of the scenes on the grounds of Gloucestershire's Woodchester Mansion.

Queen Elizabeth II reportedly felt "sad and annoyed" by how the episode portrayed the relationship between Charles and Philip during Charles' time at Gordonstoun. The episode states at its end that Charles later described his time at Gordonstoun as a "prison sentence".

The school disputed the series' portrayal of Charles' alma mater, citing in their defence a 1970s speech he made in the House of Lords and an interview published in The Observer where he gave a nuanced recollection of the school.

== Legacy ==
=== Outward bound ===
Gordonstoun temporarily relocated to Aberdyfi, Wales during World War II, while the British Army used the Gordonstoun estate as barracks. Hahn worked with friends and fellow educationalist, Lawrence Durning Holt and Jim Hogan. Holt was a partner in the Alfred Holt and Company who owned the Blue Funnel Line. Hogan was the Warden of The Blue Funnel Line's sea school in Aberdyfi, which provided four-year character-building courses and practical training to young, prospective officers. The courses included preparations for a land-based expedition as the course' finale. Due to the necessities of World War II, Aberdyfi focused on Seamanship. However, the courses' founders later claimed that their sea school didn't offer "training for the Sea", but "Training through the sea".

=== Duke of Edinburgh Award ===
Hahn founded the Moray Badge scheme in 1937. The scheme gave Moray's local children training by taking part in expeditions before completing a final project to earn the award. The Duke of Edinburgh completed his Moray badge while at Gordonstoun. Hahn approached the Duke of Edinburgh after World War II about the prospect of creating a national awards scheme based on the Moray Badge. At the time a gap existed for boys leaving school aged 15 and beginning National Service aged 18. Therefore, its founders aimed the original Duke of Edinburgh award at boys aged 15 to 18.

=== Influence on state education ===
In the U.S., Hahn's Outward-Bound approach inspired an English and Arts Curriculum known as EL Education. From 2009, U.S schools adopted the ELA curriculum after the formation of the Common Core State Standards Initiative. In Britain, former Education Secretary Nicky Morgan voiced a need for a greater curricular emphasis on character building. At the same time the educational advisor John Cridland and former shadow education minister Tristram Hunt began using phrases such as "rounded and grounded", "resilience", "team-building" and "communication skills" when discussing education.

== See also ==
- Broneirion, Gordonstoun's home during World War II
- Timbertop

== Notes ==
- a: Gordonstoun has different names for different segments of the school. The Junior School refers to the prep school, Aberlour House (ages 8 to 13) and the Senior School refer to Gordonstoun itself (ages 13–18). In addition, the Senior School is split into the Lower School (ages 13 to 16) and the Upper School (ages 16 to 18)
- b: In sports such as football and cricket, there are 11 players, and so the best team is often referred to as the First XI. Other sports have the similar terms; e.g., rugby union has the 1st XV, etc.

== Works cited ==
- Arnold-Brown, Adam (1962). Unfolding Character: The Impact of Gordonstoun. London: Routledge & Kegan Paul. OCLC 5936607.
- Brereton, Henry Lloyd (1950). Gordonstoun. The University Press Aberdeen. OCLC 22188783.
- Röhrs, Hermann (1970). Kurt Hahn: Inspirational, Visionary, Outdoor and Experiential Educator. London: Routledge & Kegan Paul. ISBN 0-7100-6885-9. OCLC 135144.
