= Peter Duncombe, 6th Baron Feversham =

English noble and writer (1945–2009)

(Charles Anthony) Peter Duncombe, 6th Baron Feversham (3 January 1945 – 29 March 2009), was a British nobleman and writer.

== Biography ==
Feversham was born in Hampshire on 3 January 1945. His parents were Colonel Anthony John Duncombe-Anderson and Gioranna Georgina Valerie McNalty. He was born Charles Anthony Peter Duncombe-Anderson, but on 12 March 1954 changed his name to Charles Anthony Peter Duncombe by deed poll. He was educated at Eton College and then trained as a barrister, before going into journalism. He published a novel, A Wolf in Tooth (1967), and a coffee table book Great Yachts (1970).

Feversham inherited his peerage from his fourth cousin the 5th Baron (who was also the 3rd Earl Feversham) in 1963; the earldom was a later creation than the barony and became extinct on the 3rd Earl's death. The 3rd Earl and 6th Baron were both great-great-great grandsons of Charles Duncombe, 1st Baron Feversham.

Beginning in 1985, Feversham restored Duncombe Park as a family home after it had been used as a girls' school since the 1920s.

Feversham served as the founding chairman of the Yorkshire Sculpture Park and from 1969 to 1976 as a governor of Leeds Polytechnic, as well as being a member of Helmsley Town Council.

== Marriage and children ==
Lord Feversham married twice. His first marriage on 12 September 1966 was to Shannon Foy, daughter of Sir Thomas Arthur Wyness Foy. They lived at Beckdale House near Helmsley and had three children:

- Jasper Orlando Slingsby Duncombe, 7th Baron Feversham (born 14 March 1968).
- Hon. Jake Barnaby Duncombe (born 17 March 1972).
- Hon. Melissa Rose Duncombe (born 1973)

Lady Feversham died on 13 August 1976, and on 6 October 1979, Lord Feversham married Pauline (Polly) Aldridge; they had one son:

- Hon. Patrick Charles Kildare Duncombe (born 1981)

Feversham died on 29 March 2009 at Castle Hill Hospital, Cottingham, East Riding of Yorkshire. His memorial service was held at All Saints' Church in Helmsley.

Feversham was succeeded in the title by his eldest son Jasper. He left Duncombe Park to his second son, Jake.

Peerage of the United Kingdom
Preceded by Charles Duncombe	Baron Feversham; 1963–2009	Succeeded by Jasper Duncombe
