= Deborah Zoe Laufer =

American playwright and theatre director

- Education: State University of New York, Purchase (BFA); Juilliard School (GrDip)
- Occupations: Playwright, director
- Writing career
- Genres: Comedy; Dark comedy; Musical theatre
- Notable awards: Helen Merrill Playwriting Award; Lillian Hellman Award for Playwriting
- Website: www.deborahzoelaufer.com

Deborah Zoe Laufer is an American playwright and theatre director. Her plays have been performed at the Steppenwolf Theatre Company, Cincinnati Playhouse in the Park, the Everyman Theatre in Baltimore, the Humana Festival of New American Plays, and Off-Broadway at The Duke on 42nd Street and the Ensemble Studio Theatre. She won a Harold and Mimi Steinberg New Play Citation from the American Theatre Critics Association for her play End Days in 2008. Reviewer Patricia Mitchell writes that Laufer is known for "dealing with serious, existential questions in seriously hilarious ways."

== Early life and education ==
Laufer grew up in Liberty, New York, in the Catskill Mountains. She has described her childhood as living in a small town, growing up in the woods and raising animals. She had an early interest in theatre, and a lifelong goal to be an actress and a stand-up comic. She studied acting at the State University of New York at Purchase. Laufer worked as an actress along with other "day jobs". She was a member of the Polaris North acting company in New York City when she became pregnant with her first son. During the pregnancy, she wrote her first play, Miniatures, and performed in it. She submitted the play to the Missoula Colony writer's workshop, where it drew the attention of playwright Marsha Norman. Norman invited her to study playwriting at the Juilliard School, where Norman taught. Laufer accepted the invitation and graduated from Juilliard in 2000.

== Career ==
More than ten of Laufer's plays have been produced professionally.

=== The Last Schwartz (2002) ===
Her dark comedy, The Last Schwartz premiered at the Florida Stage in 2002. It was subsequently performed at by the Marin Theatre Company in California, starring Jill Eikenberry and Michael Tucker, and returned to the Florida Stage in 2009. It explores family tensions that surface as the Schwartz family gathers to light the Yahrzeit candle on the one-year anniversary of their father's death, in observance with Jewish tradition. The gathered siblings deal with strained relationships, infertility, autism, alienation, and growing infirmities. Reviewer Suzanne Weiss says of the gathering that "the worst eventually comes out in everybody. And the best." Critic Bill Hirschman describes the audience member's experience as realizing that the comedy "has morphed – some time ago – into affecting drama." The Last Schwartz was nominated for South Florida Carbonell Award for Best New Play, and was included in the volume Women Playwrights, the Best Plays of 2003, published by theatrical press Smith & Kraus.

The Last Schwartz was staged by the Hungarian theater Belvárosi Színház in October 2019.

=== End Days (2007) ===
Laufer's play End Days has been characterized both as a "dark comedy" and a "sour-sweet comedy". It premiered at the Florida Stage in 2007 following a workshop productions at the Eugene O'Neill Theatre Center in Connecticut. It was later performed Off-Broadway at the Ensemble Studio Theatre in 2009. Set in the aftermath of the September 11 attacks, it follows the struggles of a New York family to find healing and wholeness after the tragedy. The father, Arthur, is the only survivor from a small company that had been based in the World Trade Center, and is nearly catatonic. The mother, Sylvia, turns to Jesus, who appears (only to her and the audience) constantly in her presence; her daughter Rachel has a similar imagined relationship with the physicist Stephen Hawking. Into this situation arrives Nelson, the neighbor boy whose Elvis Presley-inspired sequined jumpsuit makes him the target of scorn, but whose relationships with Arthur and with Rachel bring changes to their family.

Although Charles Isherwood, reviewing the Ensemble Studio production for The New York Times, found the characters to be "drawn with varying levels of persuasiveness," other critics were more receptive. Writing for Variety about the same production, Sam Thielman stated that "Laufer has nailed down inter-teenager dynamics with a precision that parents are likely to envy" and "the playwright has an enviable gift for crafting vulnerable moments between her characters." Writing about a 2011 production at by the Odyssey Theatre Ensemble in Los Angeles, reviewer Margaret Gray said that "Laufer’s unique sense of humor, Lisa James’ lighthearted direction and the actors’ enthusiasm ensure that End Days, even at its least plausible, sheds authentic light on the human condition."

End Days was awarded a Harold and Mimi Steinberg New Play Citation from the American Theatre Critics Association. The citation carries at $7,500 prize. End Times has been produced 70 times around the United States, and has also played in Germany, Russia, and Australia.

=== Leveling Up (2013) ===
Leveling Up premiered at the Cincinnati Playhouse in the Park in 2013 after being workshopped at the Eugene O'Neill Theatre Center in 2011. It centers around three young men (Ian, Chuck, and Zander) living together playing videos, as well as Zander's girlfriend, Jeannie. The National Security Agency recruits Ian to conduct real war, remotely flying armed drones, which leads to tensions and ethical qualms among the characters. The play addresses themes of growing up, friendship, simulation and reality.

Cincinnati CityBeat reviewer Rick Pender found the script and the Cincinnati production to be "believably here and now, replete with bursts of humor, anxiety and violence." Reviews of a 2014 production at the Steppenwolf Theatre in Chicago were mixed; writing for Stage and Screen, Samantha Nelson found the script "incredibly preachy," while Patrick Dyer of Chicago Theater Beat thought it was "intelligent without being preachy and funny without being goofy or awkward."

=== Informed Consent (2014) ===
Informed Consent premiered at the Geva Theatre Center in Rochester in 2014, co-produced with the Cleveland Play House, where it played after the Geva run. It went on to be performed Off-Broadway at the Duke on 42nd Street Theatre in 2015. The play tackles issues of medical ethics and is inspired by a real-life ethical controversy, the Havasupai blood sample controversy. The lead character, Jillian, is a genetic anthropologist studying a Native American tribe, the Havasupai people. Although her research is intended to help discover possibly genetic causes of high rates of obesity-related Type 2 diabetes in the tribe, she is enticed by the prospect of conducting additional genetic research using the blood samples collected, in violation of the agreed use of those samples.

The play was developed through a research process that included interviews with native tribal members and consultation with a panel discussions with experts. Although informed by the real-life controversy, and using the same initial situation, the character of Jillian is fictional, and the particular dilemmas and research interests facing the character are different.

Reviewing the Cleveland production, Bob Abelman writes, "the playwright and director Sean Daniels squeeze all the simultaneously disclosed science, personal crisis and philosophical debate into a beautifully woven, cleverly conceived and highly entertaining tapestry of storytelling." Of the same production, reviewer Christine Howey said, "The audience finds themselves in a conundrum of whether to laugh or cry, often doing both."

New York Times reviewer Charles Isherwood called the 2015 production at The Duke " thoughtful and engrossing" and notes that "The affecting ancillary story — of Jillian’s Type-A personality and the problems it causes in her marriage — is woven neatly into the plot." He concludes by stating that "Informed Consent is a reminder that some mistakes must be paid for."

=== Be Here Now (2018) ===
Be Here Now was commissioned from Laufer by the Cincinnati Playhouse in the Park, and premiered there in 2018. Laufer subsequently directed a production of the play at Florida Atlantic University (FAU). It features Bari, a cynical ex-professor living in upstate New York, working at curio import fulfillment center, and attempting to finish her dissertation on Nihilism. Countering Bari is her co-worker's cousin Mike, who has survived tragedy and faces the world with optimism. Bari's life is changed by a seizure and a diagnosis of Geschwind syndrome, which has mood-altering effects and frequent headaches. Bari and Mike begin dating, which has its ups and downs.

Cincinnati CityBeat reviewer Jackie Mulay found that the "characters and their encounters blend to form a work that is ultimately about connecting to those around you in order to truly find yourself." Writing of the FAU production, Hap Erstein found it a "quirky and ultimately life-affirming romantic comedy." For the Miami Art Zine, Roger Martin wrote, " Deborah Zoe Laufer wrote the terrific script and also directed flawlessly."

=== Rooted (2022) ===
Rooted, like Be Here Now, was commissioned by the Cincinnati Play House in the Park, set to open February 17, 2022. It is described as a "follow-up" to Be Here Now, the second in a projected trilogy of plays loosely based on the town in the Catskills where Laufer grew up. The central character is the Emery Harris, a reclusive amateur botanist living in a treehouse who gains a cult following on YouTube. She is surprised to find that her followers regard her as a "new-age messiah." The play takes place entirely in Emery's treehouse, and includes two other characters admitted to the space: Emery's "pragmatic" sister, Hazel, and Luanne, one of the "seekers" who gather outside. Luanne also appeared as a character in Be Here Now, and the same actress (Emily Kratter) performed the role in the premiere of each play. Laufer wrote in the program for the premiere that she used the play to explore themes of "the yearning for meaning and belief, the struggle to be truly present, the power of female friendship and what happens when you slow down and allow there to be quiet and connection in the midst of a chaotic, sometimes frightening world."

=== Professional organizations ===
Laufer has been involved with professional organizations supporting playwriting. She has taught workshops as part of the Dramatists Guild Fund's Traveling Masters program, and served as a judge for the Horton Foote Prize. She was elected to be a member Dramatists Guild Council in 2019.

== Plays ==
- Miniatures - World Premier at Polaris North
- The Gulf of Westchester - World Premier at Florida Stage
- The Last Schwartz (2002) - World Premier at Florida Stage
- Fortune (2005) - World Premier at Marin Theatre Company
- End Days (2007) - World Premier at Florida Stage
- Out of Sterno (2009) - World Premier at Portland (ME) Stage
- Sirens (2010) - World Premier at the Humana Festival
- Leveling Up (2013) - World Premier at Cincinnati Playhouse in the Park
- Informed Consent (2014) - World Premier at Geva Theatre, co-produced with Cleveland Play House
- The Three Sisters of Weehawken (2016) - World Premier at Theatre Lab (Florida Atlantic University)
- Be Here Now (2018) - World Premier at Cincinnati Playhouse in the Park
- Window Treatment (2018) [musical] - World Premier at Inner Voices 2018
- Rooted (2022) - World Premier at Cincinnati Playhouse in the Park
- The Last Yiddish Speaker (2024) - World Premier at InterAct Theatre Company

== Awards ==
- Harold and Mimi Steinberg/ACTA New Play Award, 2008, for End Days
- Helen Merrill Playwriting Award, 2009
- Lillian Hellman Award for Playwriting, 2010
- Jewish Playwriting Contest, winner, 2024, for The Last Yiddish Speaker
- Carbonell Award for Outstanding New Work, 2024-2025 season, for The Last Yiddish Speaker
