= William Duncombe (composer) =

English composer

William Duncombe (ca. 1736-1738 – 30 November 1818, or 1819) was an English composer. He was an organist in Kensington.

He is mainly known by a few small piano pieces (especially a Sonatina in C Major and the Fanfare or Fanfare Minuet) that are still reprinted in pedagogical collections. They are probably excerpts of the Progressive lessons for the harpsichord and piano forte, published in 1778 (or 1785).

Duncombe is frequently confused with the writer William Duncombe (1690 – 1769).

== Works ==
- First Book of Progressive Lessons for the Harpsichord and Piano Forte – London : J. Bland, n.d. [1778]
- Second Book of Twelve Progressive Lessons for the Harpsichord or Piano Forte – London : J. Bland, n.d. [1778]
- The Favorite Air, of God save the King, with variations for two performers on one piano forte, or harpsichord – London, [1792]
- An hymn to be sung by the charity children of Kensington, at their parish church, on Sunday, 15 December 1793, after a sermon preached in the Morning by the Rev. Archer Thompson, A.B. Chaplain to the Bishop of Bristol, Joint Morning Preacher of Portman Chapel and St. James's Chapel, Tottenham-Court-Road, and Vicar of Thatcham, Berks. The Music by Mr. Duncombe − [London]: Martin, Kensington, [1793]
- What tho' the sun withdraws his ray – London, n.d. [1760?]
