= Level Up (comics) =

2011 graphic novel by Gene Luen Yang

- Date: June 2011
- Page count: 160 pages
- Publisher: First Second Books

Creative team
- Writers: Gene Luen Yang
- Artists: Thien Pham

Original publication
- Language: English

Level Up is a 2011 graphic novel written by American cartoonist Gene Luen Yang and illustrated by Thien Pham. The book was published in June 2011 by First Second Books.

== Plot ==
Dennis Ouyang is a young man who loves to play video games but is struggling to enter medical school. Having been pressured by his parents since childhood, Dennis struggles to keep his goal of becoming a gastroenterologist like his late father always wanted him to be. When it seems like his goal has failed, four angels suddenly appear and persuade him to keep on studying for medical school. The four angels help Dennis with his daily chores so that he can focus on his studies.

Eventually, Dennis makes it to medical school, where he makes friends with Ipsha Narang, a Hindu student who comes from a long line of surgeons, Hector Martinez, a former jock who decided to study medicine after a car crash, and Catherine Rae, who was shot when she was a child but was saved by a mysterious man. Dennis becomes infatuated with Catherine.

Dennis and his friends start a study group, which results in him beginning to neglect the four angels. After his teacher gives the class an assignment that involves collecting feces, Dennis becomes disgusted and begins to doubt himself again. Matters get worse when he and Catherine have a conversation in which Dennis tells her it is his destiny to be a doctor like his father wanted him to be. Catherine verbally assaults him and tells him to think for himself and not to allow his father's wishes to define him.

One night while at their study group, Catherine still berates Dennis for letting his family define him. Ipsha, who has an obvious crush on Dennis, becomes angry and leaves the group. Dennis goes after her but Ipsha tells him to leave her alone and that family does determine who one is. All the commotion causes Hector to leave the study group and eventually Catherine and Dennis stop seeing each other, disbanding the group.

Dennis goes back to relying on the angels for study help. However, keeping Catherine's words in mind and after seemingly failing to perform a gallbladder exam, Dennis decides to take charge of his life for once. He goes home and tells the angels that he's decided to leave medical school. The angels become angry and lock him in his bedroom. Dennis manages to escape but the angels follow him. He sees that the angels are really Pac-Man ghosts and realizes he is the yellow man. He begins to devour the ghosts and experience visions, discovering what they truly are: his father's broken promises. He had promised his mother, father, and uncle he would become a doctor, and finally, he promised Dennis when he was a baby that he would make him a better man. During the final vision, Dennis briefly speaks with his father who informs him that he gave up on being a doctor after failing to get into medical school several times. He also declares that Dennis is free to choose his own path by saying, "a better man is a happier man".

Dennis wakes up in the school's infirmary after passing out, having been taken there by Catherine and Hector who found him acting insane on the street, and announces he's dropping out. The next day, he leaves medical school and goes back to playing video games, testing them online and competing in competitions, winning money prizes in return. However, he still isn't happy. After meeting a store clerk whom Dennis tested on his gallbladder exam, the man reveals he had saved his life having felt a tumor, which he treated.

Having realized that what he really wants is to help people, he returns to medical school, where he is greeted by Ipsha who gives him her number. Dennis checks in with one of his old teachers. The graphic novel ends with Dennis helping the doctor with an interactive video of an intestine with his video game skills.

== Reception ==
The New York Times reviewer Pamela Paul praised the book for its authenticity, noting that the characters and their stories felt true, even if the overall narrative was "not especially original." Paul made particular note of Pham's artwork, calling his debut "a welcome surprise."

Publishers Weekly also gave special attention to Pham's art, calling Level Up "a minor work from Yang, but a welcome introduction to Pham."

The book made the "2012 Popular Paperbacks for Young Adults" by the Young Adult Library Services Association. The New York Times also named the book to its "Notable Children's Books of 2011" list.
