= Jasper Duncombe, 7th Baron Feversham =

British pornographic film producer and peer

Jasper Orlando Slingsby Duncombe, 7th Baron Feversham, (born 14 March 1968), also known as The Porn Baron, is a British nobleman and producer of pornographic films.

== Biography ==
Feversham is the eldest son of the late Peter Duncombe, 6th Baron Feversham, and was educated at Gordonstoun with Prince Edward. After serving three years in prison for attempted robbery while high on cocaine, he founded the pornographic film companies Tongue in Cheek and Relish XXX, the latter of which sells titles to National Health Service fertility clinics and sperm banks. They also installed vending machines with VHS cassettes and DVDs in pub lavatories.

He was estranged from his father in the years before the latter's death due to his father's disapproval of his career choice, and was thus disinherited from his father's £46-million estate. However, as eldest son, he succeeded to the barony itself on his father's death on 29 March 2009.

He lives in Fulham, London.

== Notes ==
Peerage of the United Kingdom
Preceded by Peter Duncombe	Baron Feversham; 2009–present	Incumbent; Heir apparent: Hon. Orlando Duncombe
