= Loreto Convent School, Pretoria =

Loreto Convent School

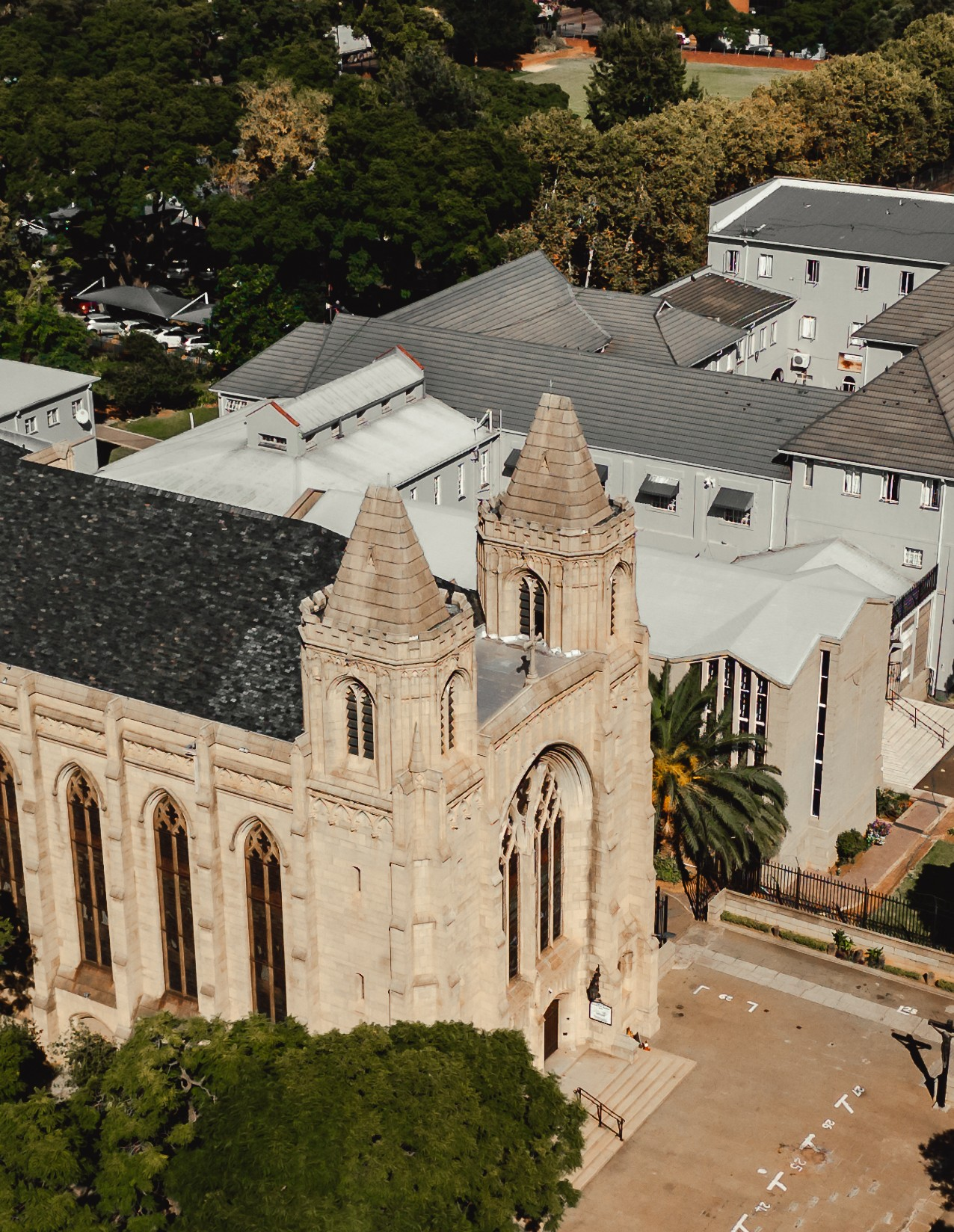
- Loreto Convent school, Pretoria, aerial view

Location
- 135 Nana Sita Street; Pretoria, Gauteng; South Africa; 25°45′05″S 28°11′07″E

Information
- Type: Independent Catholic school
- Motto: Cruci dum Spiro fido (Throughout my life, I shall place my hope in the Cross)
- Religious affiliation: Catholic Church (Archdiocese of Pretoria)
- Denomination: Roman Catholic
- Established: June 7, 1878; 148 years ago
- Founder: Institute of the Blessed Virgin Mary
- Principal: Suzette Truter
- Grades: RRR–12
- Gender: Co-educational (Grade RRR–7); girls only (Grade 8–12)
- Enrolment: ~512 (2026)
- Accreditation: Umalusi (15 SCH01 00091)
- Alumni: Loreto Convent Alumni - Pretoria
- Website: www.loreto.co.za

Loreto Convent School is an independent Catholic school in the central business district of Pretoria, Gauteng, South Africa, offering education from pre-school through to Grade 12. It is co-educational from Grade RRR to Grade 7 and admits girls only from Grade 8 to Grade 12. Founded on 7 June 1878 by sisters of the Institute of the Blessed Virgin Mary (IBVM, also known as the Loreto Sisters), it is the oldest school in Pretoria in continuous operation and the first Catholic school established in the Transvaal.

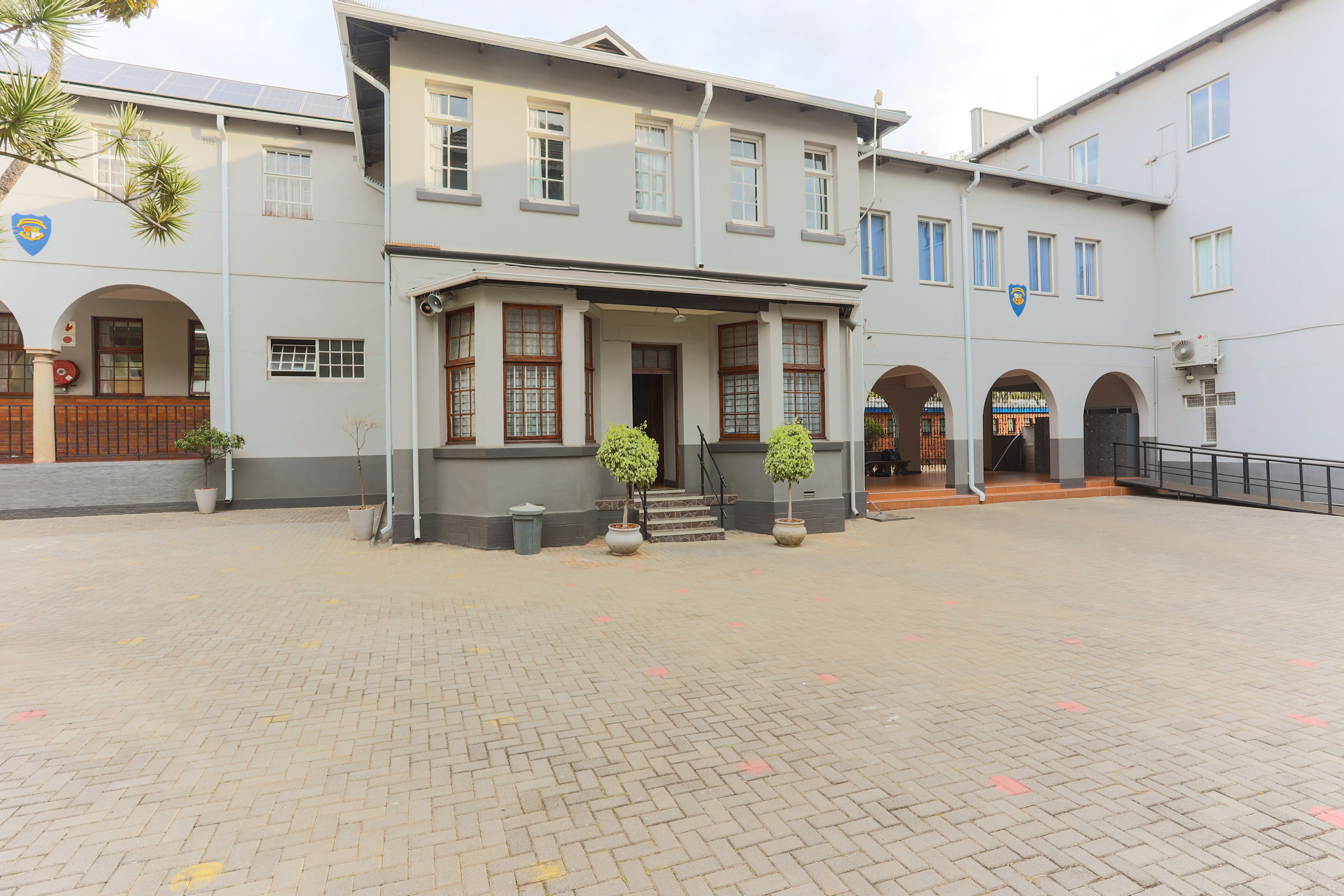
Loreto Convent School, Pretoria, Courtyard

The school is co-educational from Grade RRR to Grade 7 and admits girls only from Grade 8 to Grade 12. It follows the South African Curriculum and Assessment Policy Statement (CAPS) and is accredited by Umalusi to offer the National Senior Certificate. The school forms part of the network of three Loreto schools in South Africa, alongside Loreto School Queenswood in Pretoria and Loreto Convent, Strand, near Cape Town.

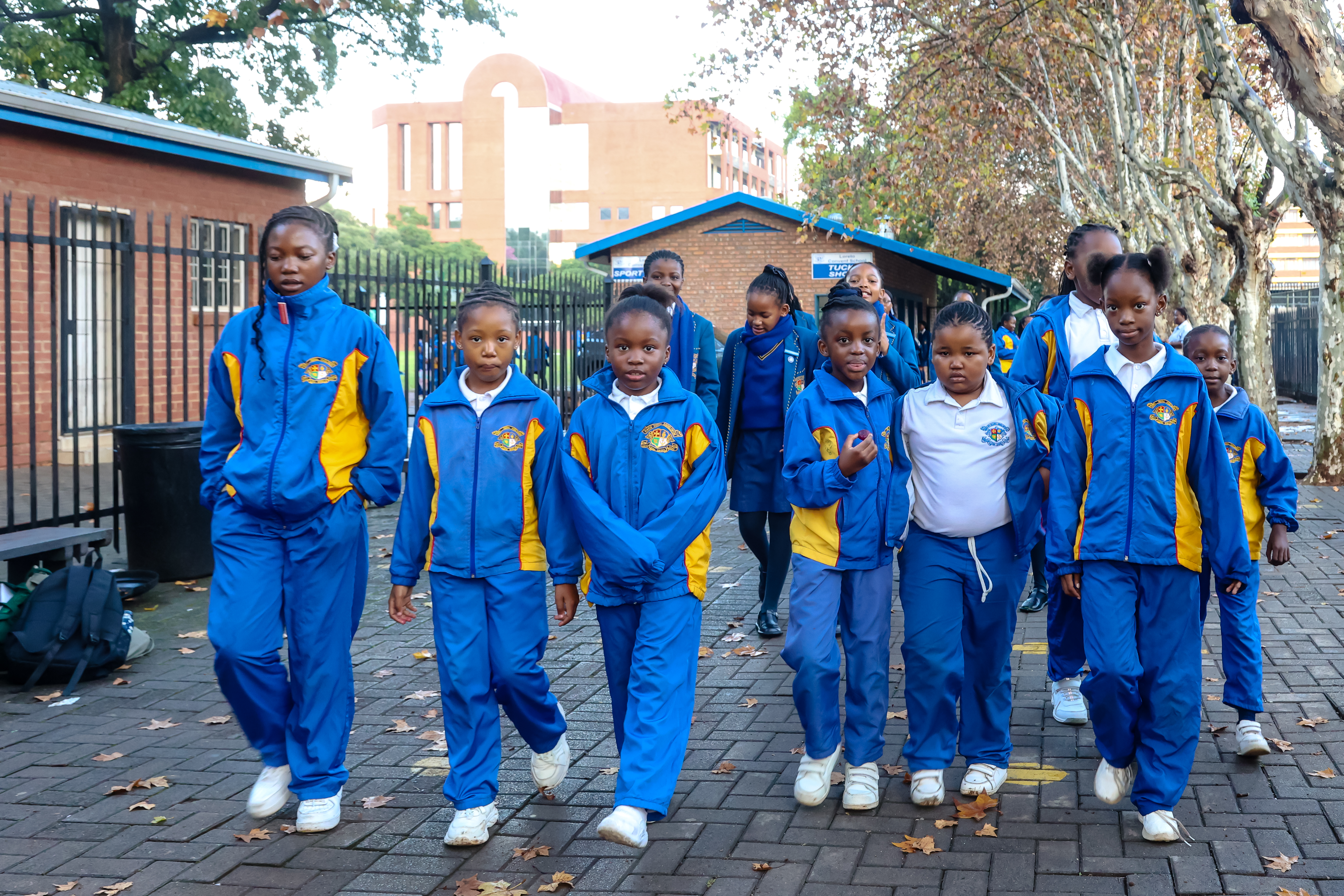
Loreto Convent School, Pretoria, Kids in Tree Avenue

The school is situated on Nana Sita Street (formerly Skinner Street), adjoining the Sacred Heart cathedral, the seat of the Archdiocese of Pretoria. The convent and cathedral were established in close partnership in the late 1870s; the convent grounds were used as a civilian sanctuary during the First Anglo-Boer War siege of Pretoria in 1880–1881.

== History ==
=== Founding (1878) ===
The Catholic Church had been prohibited in the South African Republic (Transvaal) until 1870, when the legal restriction on Catholic worship was lifted. President Pretorius of the South African Republic granted the Catholic Church land at the corner of Bloed and Potgieter streets in Pretoria; after the British annexation of the Transvaal in 1877, Sir Theophilus Shepstone exchanged this land for a larger site at the corner of Skinner and Bosman streets, where the cathedral and the school now stand. Bishop Charles Jolivet of the Vicariate of Natal travelled to Pretoria to establish a Catholic mission in the city, celebrating the first Catholic Mass in Pretoria on 8 June 1877.

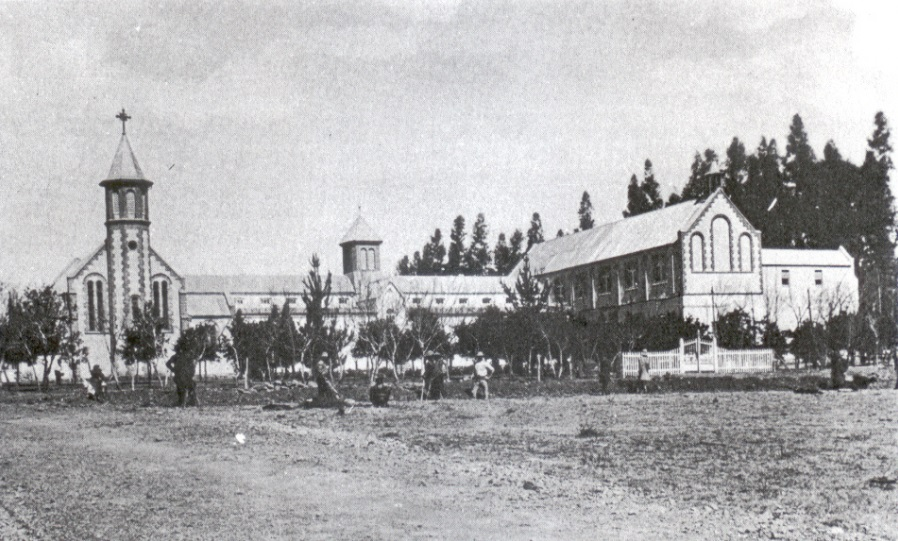
Loreto Convent School, Pretoria, 1890

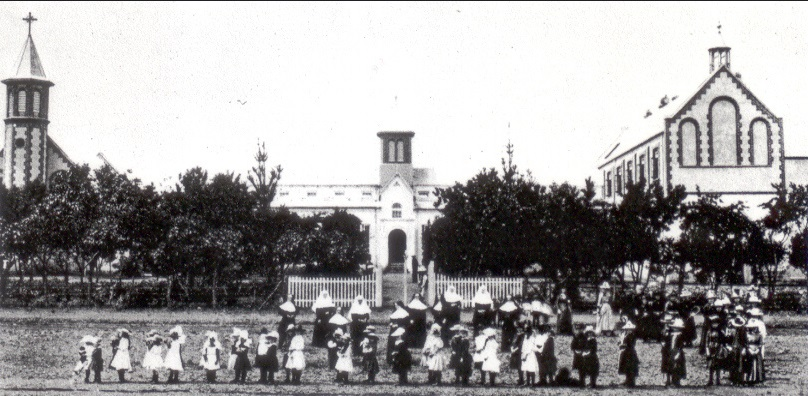
Loreto Convent School, Pretoria, Church Parade, 1890

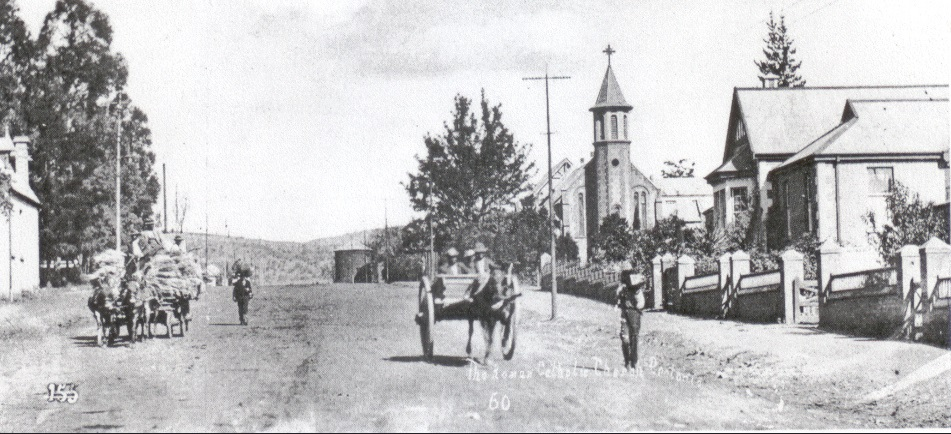
Loreto Convent School, Pretoria Church, 1890

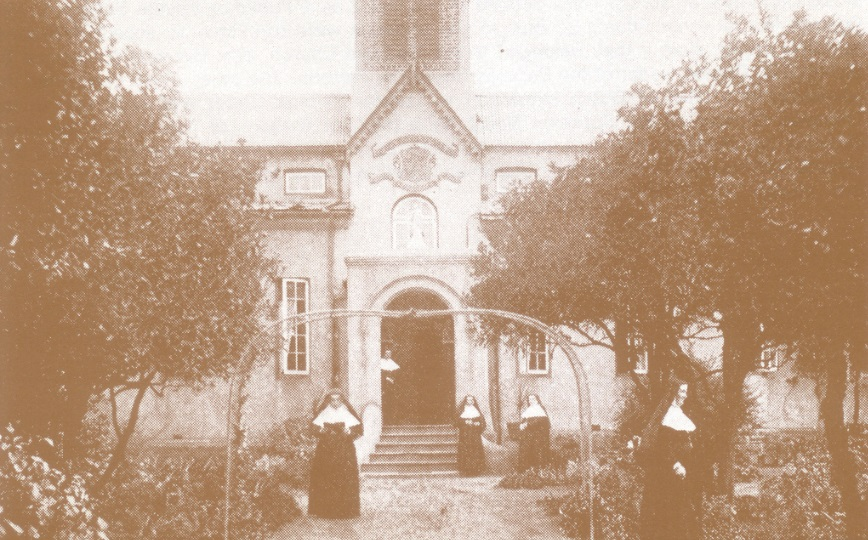
Loreto Convent School, Pretoria, 1913-1927, School Front

Bishop Jolivet wrote to the Loreto convent at Navan in Ireland to invite sisters to establish a convent and school in the new mission. A party of Loreto sisters, led by Mother Margaret Mary (Céline) Jolivet — Bishop Jolivet's sister — arrived in Pretoria on 17 May 1878 after travelling from Ireland by ship to Durban, by stage coach to Pietermaritzburg, and by ox-wagon to Pretoria. The school opened on 7 June 1878, with twenty pupils in the high school and six in the parochial primary school.

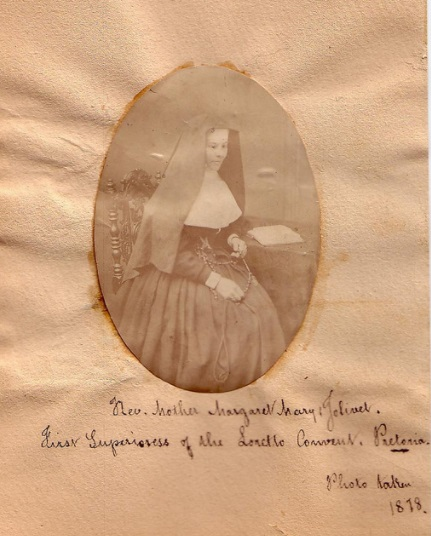
Sr Jolivet, Young, 1818

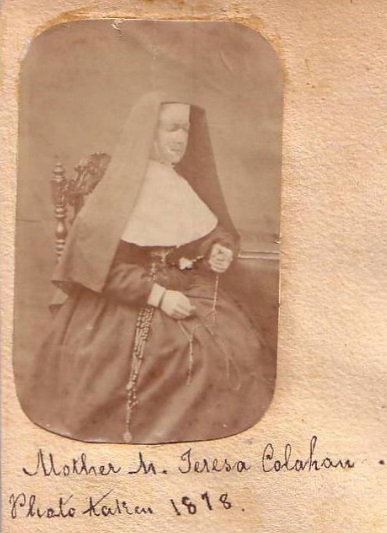
Mother M. Teresa Colahan, 1878

The legal historian DM Pretorius identifies Loreto Convent as among the earliest of the four state-aided private schools founded in Pretoria during the British annexation period, alongside Prospect Seminary, St Birinus Diocesan School (Anglican, 1879) and St Etheldreda's School, later renamed St Mary's Diocesan School for Girls (Anglican, 1879). By 1880 there were eleven government schools and twelve state-aided private schools in the Transvaal.

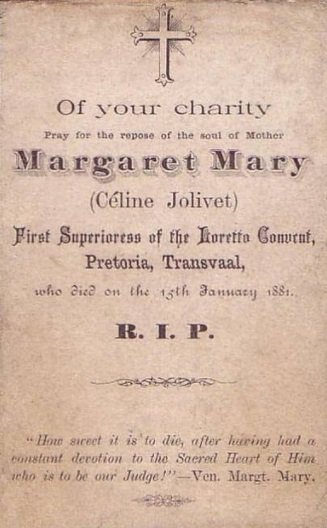
Mother Margaret Mary (Céline Jolivet), Death Notice

=== First Anglo-Boer War and the Siege of Pretoria (1880–1881) ===
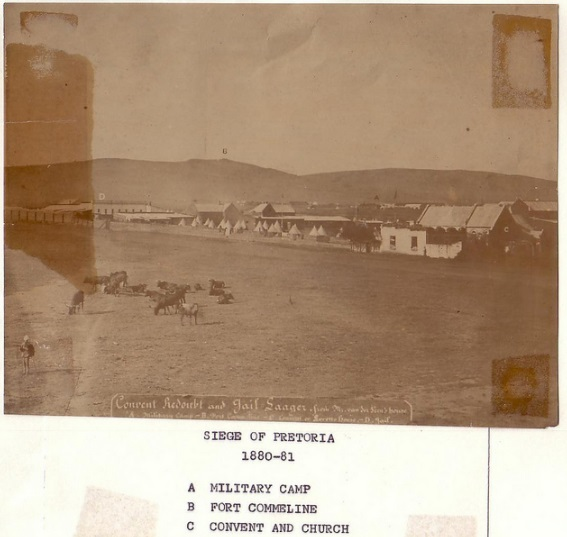
Loreto Convent School, Pretoria, Siege 1880

The First Boer War broke out in December 1880, shortly after the school was established. The school's published institutional history records that on 16 December 1880 the convent buildings were taken over by the British military for use during the siege of Pretoria that followed. The convent buildings and grounds — by then occupying the entire city block — were converted into a fortified sanctuary for the women and children of the town, while approximately six hundred British soldiers were camped on the convent grounds.

=== Late nineteenth century ===
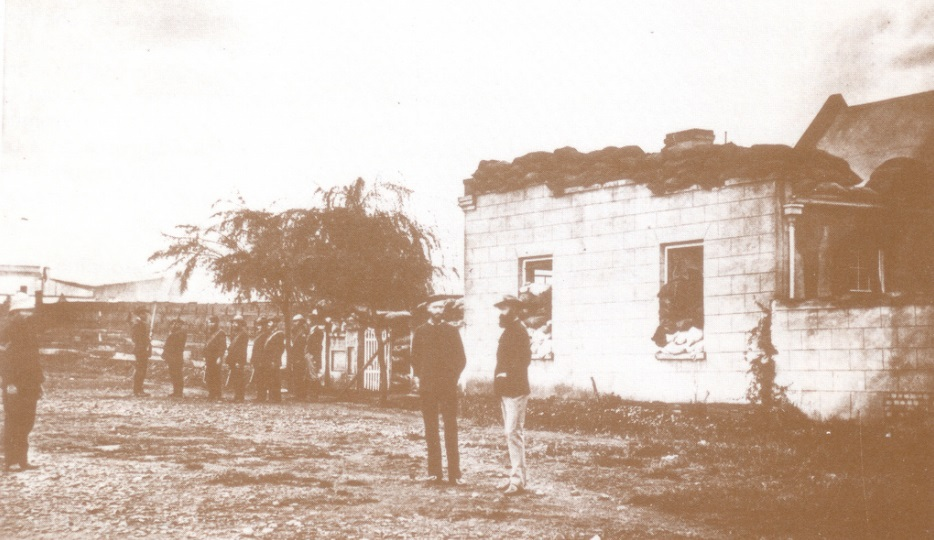
Loreto Convent School, Pretoria, During Siege

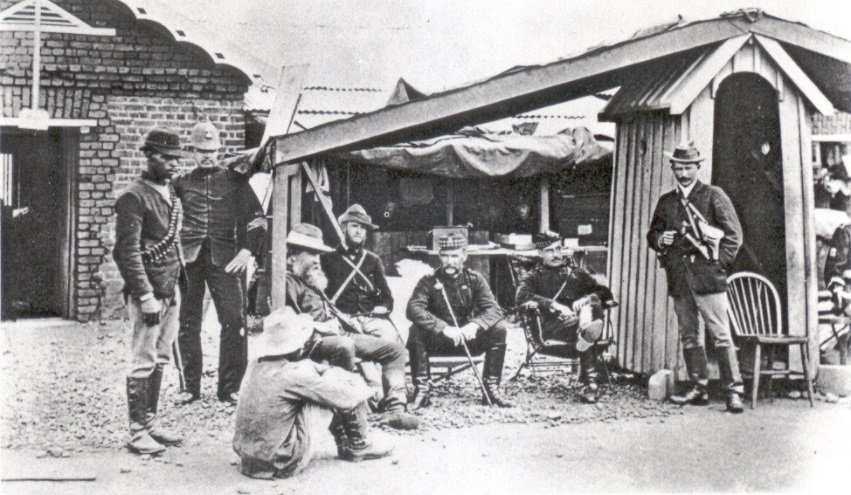
Loreto Convent School, Pretoria, Redoubt Camp,1890's

The school resumed normal operations following the end of the siege of Pretoria in March 1881. In 1891, the school received its first government subsidy from the Kruger administration of the South African Republic, granted on condition that Dutch was taught in the school. On the outbreak of the Second Boer War in 1899 the school was temporarily closed; two of the founding sisters, Mother Joseph and Mother Teresa Colahan, travelled to Ireland to seek replacement personnel.

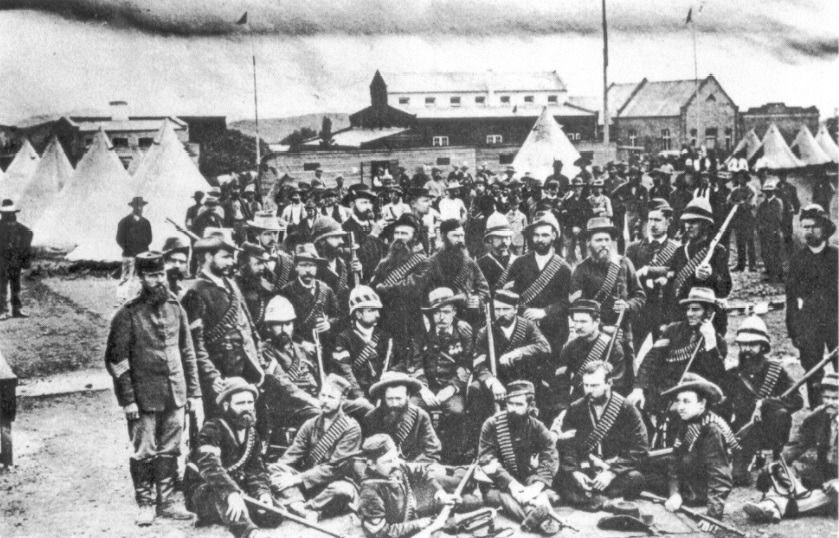
Loreto Convent School, Pretoria, Redoubt Camp 1890's (Convent priest house background)

=== Twentieth century ===
The Transvaal Education Ordinance of 1903, introduced after the Second Boer War, imposed comprehensive registration and inspection requirements on private schools in the colony. Catholic private schools in the Transvaal were among those that continued without state aid after the Bantu Education Act of 1953 made state funding of mission and church schools subject to apartheid policy conditions; the Catholic Church was one of the religious bodies that elected to continue private operations rather than accept these conditions. The school did not receive further government subsidy until 1986. The school operated as a boarding school until the end of 1982, when the boarding department was closed.

The school's centenary in 1978 was marked by a week-long seminar in January attended by the Mother General of the Institute of the Blessed Virgin Mary, Sister Agnes Walsh, and a pageant of Loreto history was staged on the hockey field in May, followed by an outdoor Mass at which Cardinal Owen McCann of Cape Town was the principal celebrant. Sister Clement Kelly was Principal of the school at the time. In the same year, the school took the institutional decision to write the Transvaal Education Department Senior Certificate Examinations in alignment with the government schools.

In May 1987, the South African Province of the Institute resolved at its assembly that the management of the Loreto schools would be handed to the laity and that the sisters would be available to work in other apostolates, in response to the post-Vatican II "preferential option for the poor". In January 1988, a Board of Management was constituted for Loreto Skinner Street, with Mr J. McMenamin as its first chairman; he was succeeded mid-year by Mr Wilson, an attorney. Mrs Hélène Addis, who had been teaching at St Paulus Primary School in Pretoria for ten years, was appointed first lay Principal in August 1988 and took office in January 1989. She replaced Sister Joan McLoughlin, who had served as Principal for approximately eight years and who was the last Sister Principal of the school. Mrs Addis served as Principal until 1995, and was succeeded by Mrs Renée d'Oliveira in 1996. Mrs Addis attended the National Catholic Schools' Congress held in Durban in 1991, which affirmed the Catholic school as "an environment of healing and reconciliation in the present situation of turmoil".

=== Swart NO v De Kock (1951) ===
In 1950 the Transvaal Provincial Council passed a Language Ordinance restricting the medium of instruction in private schools. The school became the subject of the subsequent constitutional litigation in the Appellate Division of the Supreme Court of South Africa over the powers of the Provincial Councils over private schools. A pupil of Flemish parentage enrolled at Loreto Convent was being educated through the medium of English. The Transvaal Education Department notified the school's Mother Superior that the pupil's home language had been determined to be Afrikaans and that the school's continued instruction of the pupil in English contravened the Ordinance.

The Mother Superior, together with the Bishop of Pretoria, obtained an order in the Transvaal Provincial Division of the Supreme Court declaring the relevant provisions of the Ordinance to have been enacted in excess of the Provincial Council's powers under section 85 of the South Africa Act, which empowered the Council only to legislate on "education other than higher education". On appeal, the Appellate Division reversed the Provincial Division's order. The majority, led by Chief Justice Centlivres, held that the Provincial Council was empowered to require mother-tongue instruction in private schools as part of its constitutional competence over education. Schreiner JA dissented, holding that the freedom of parents to choose the medium of instruction at a private school could not be displaced by Provincial regulation. The case is regarded in South African legal history as a significant moment in the diminishing autonomy of private schools during the apartheid era; Schreiner JA's dissent has been described as among the great dissenting opinions of the South African appellate bench.

=== Integration (1971–1990) ===
According to the school's institutional history, Loreto Convent at Hillcrest — a Pretoria branch of the Loreto network, established as a Branch House in 1923 and operating as a school until its closure in 1976 — admitted the daughter of the Malawian Ambassador to South Africa as its first non-white pupil in 1971; Loreto Convent at Skinner Street is recorded as having followed under a quota system that limited the number of pupils of other races. Loreto Convent Hillcrest was closed in 1976 when its property was sold to the University of Pretoria for the university's expansion, and the school's tradition was transferred to the new Loreto School Queenswood site.

In January 1976, the Southern African Catholic Bishops' Conference (SACBC) resolved at its plenary session to open all 192 of its private Catholic schools in South Africa to pupils of all races, defying the National Party government's policy of apartheid racial segregation in education. The decision has been described as the first major institutional breach of school apartheid. Quiet admissions of black, Asian and mixed-race pupils began at three Catholic schools in March 1976 and expanded over the course of the year; by early 1977, when news of the integrated schools became public, at least six were affected, prompting the Transvaal and Cape provincial governments to threaten to close them. As a private Catholic school within the SACBC's network, Loreto Convent was part of the 192 schools to which the resolution applied.

During the 1980s, after Skinner Street had opened its doors to pupils of all races, the Pretoria municipal authorities refused to admit the school's black pupils to the City Hall (the school did not yet have a hall of its own) and refused to allow them to participate in inter-school sports fixtures. The school's published institutional history records that the school chose to withdraw from competitive inter-school sport entirely, rather than send only its white pupils to fixtures from which the others were excluded; for much of the decade, Skinner Street's sport became largely non-competitive as a result. In 1990 the school appointed its first black Head Girl, Martha Mokone.

=== Twenty-first century ===
In 2001, the resident community of Loreto Sisters at Skinner Street began to relinquish parts of the convent buildings for use by the school. The first floor of the west wing, the administration offices facing Skinner Street, and the former dining room, kitchen and laundry were converted into classrooms, a meeting room, and an enlarged Media Centre. The Bridging classroom built for the pre-school in 1997 was converted into the school's Day Care Centre in the same year. In 2002, with the agreement of the Governing Body, parents and staff, the school resolved to close senior primary admissions for boys; the change was phased over four years, with boys admitted only up to Grade 3 from 2006 onwards.

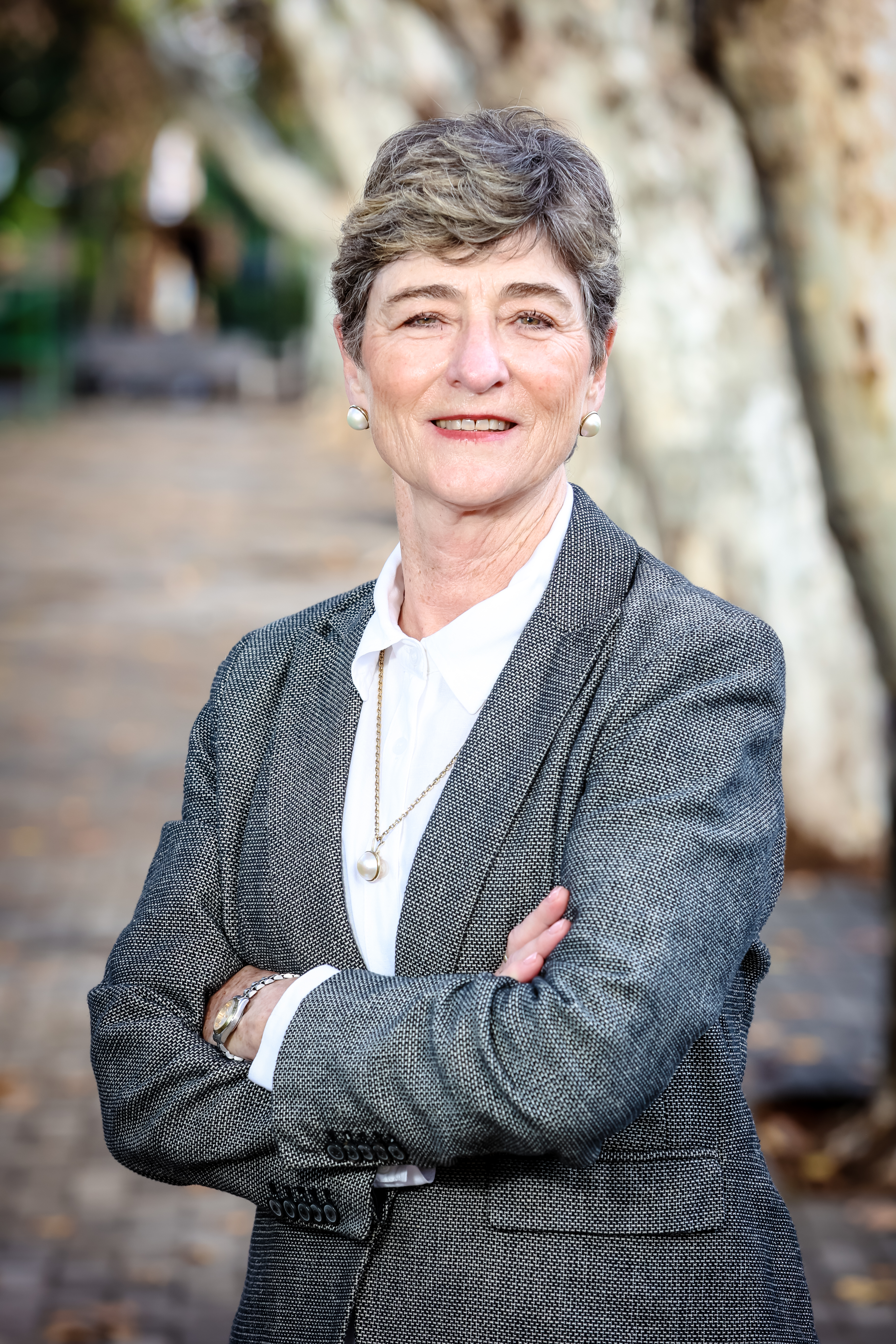
Mrs Suzette Truter - Current Principal, LCS Pretoria

In 2006, Mrs Renée d'Oliveira was succeeded as Principal by Mr Stuart Shillinglaw. In 2008, the resident community of Loreto Sisters left the convent buildings entirely, with the school taking full occupation of the former convent for use as additional offices and a media centre, and a new Daycare centre was opened in the same year. Mr Shillinglaw retired as Executive Principal in 2016, and Mrs Suzette Truter was appointed to succeed him from the 2017 academic year.

== Campus ==
The school is situated at 135 Nana Sita Street (formerly Skinner Street) in the Pretoria central business district. The site has been continuously occupied by the school since its founding in 1878. The campus adjoins the Cathedral of the Sacred Heart, the seat of the Archdiocese of Pretoria, with which the school has been institutionally linked since the simultaneous establishment of both the parish and the school in 1877–1878. The present Cathedral building, completed in 1933 to a New Gothic design by the Irish architect BJ Glinch, is the third church to stand on the adjoining site. The school's hall was completed in 1998, the foundation stone having been laid in 1997 and the building blessed by Archbishop George Daniel of Pretoria.

== School today ==
As of 2026, Loreto Convent School has approximately 512 learners across its three phases: 24 in the pre-school (Grades RRR to R), 194 in the primary school (Grades 1 to 7), and 294 in the high school (Grades 8 to 12). The school employs 39 educators, supported by an administrative and support staff of nine.

The Executive Principal is Suzette Truter, who took office at the start of the 2017 academic year. The senior management team comprises a Deputy Principal of the High School, a Deputy Principal of the Primary School, a whole-school Religious Education Coordinator, and four Phase Heads — for the Further Education and Training phase, the Senior phase, the Intermediate Phase ("Intersen"), and the Foundation Phase.

== Academics ==
The school is registered as an independent school in Gauteng under the South African Schools Act and assigned EMIS number 700231043 by the Department of Basic Education. It follows the national Curriculum and Assessment Policy Statement (CAPS). The high school operates as a girls-only school from Grade 8 to Grade 12; the primary phase is co-educational from Grade RRR to Grade 7. The school is accredited by Umalusi, the Council for Quality Assurance in General and Further Education and Training, to offer the National Curriculum Statement in Grades 1 to 12 leading to the National Senior Certificate; its accreditation number is 15 SCH01 00091, with effect from 1 July 2015.

=== Institutional status ===
The school is approved as a Public Benefit Organisation (PBO) in terms of section 30 of the Income Tax Act, with its receipts and accruals exempt from income tax under section 10(1)(cN) of the Act. It also holds approval under section 18A(1)(a), which provides that bona fide donations to the school are deductible from the donor's taxable income, subject to the limits prescribed in section 18A. The school's reference number with the South African Revenue Service Tax Exemption Unit is 18/11/13/2608.

== Religious identity ==
The school belongs to the worldwide network of schools founded by, and inheriting the educational tradition of, the Mary Ward family of religious institutes — the Institute of the Blessed Virgin Mary (IBVM, popularly known as the Loreto Sisters) and the Congregation of Jesus (CJ). Mary Ward (1585–1645), an English recusant from Yorkshire, founded the Institute in 1609 with the aim of providing girls with an education comparable to that available to boys, modelled on the constitutions of the Society of Jesus. The Loreto branch of the Institute was established in Ireland in 1821 by Frances Mary Teresa Ball at Rathfarnham Abbey in Dublin, and from there spread to Africa, Asia, the Americas, and Australia.

The school is a member of the Catholic Schools Office (Western Cape and Gauteng), the body co-ordinating Catholic schools in those provinces.

=== Crest and motto ===
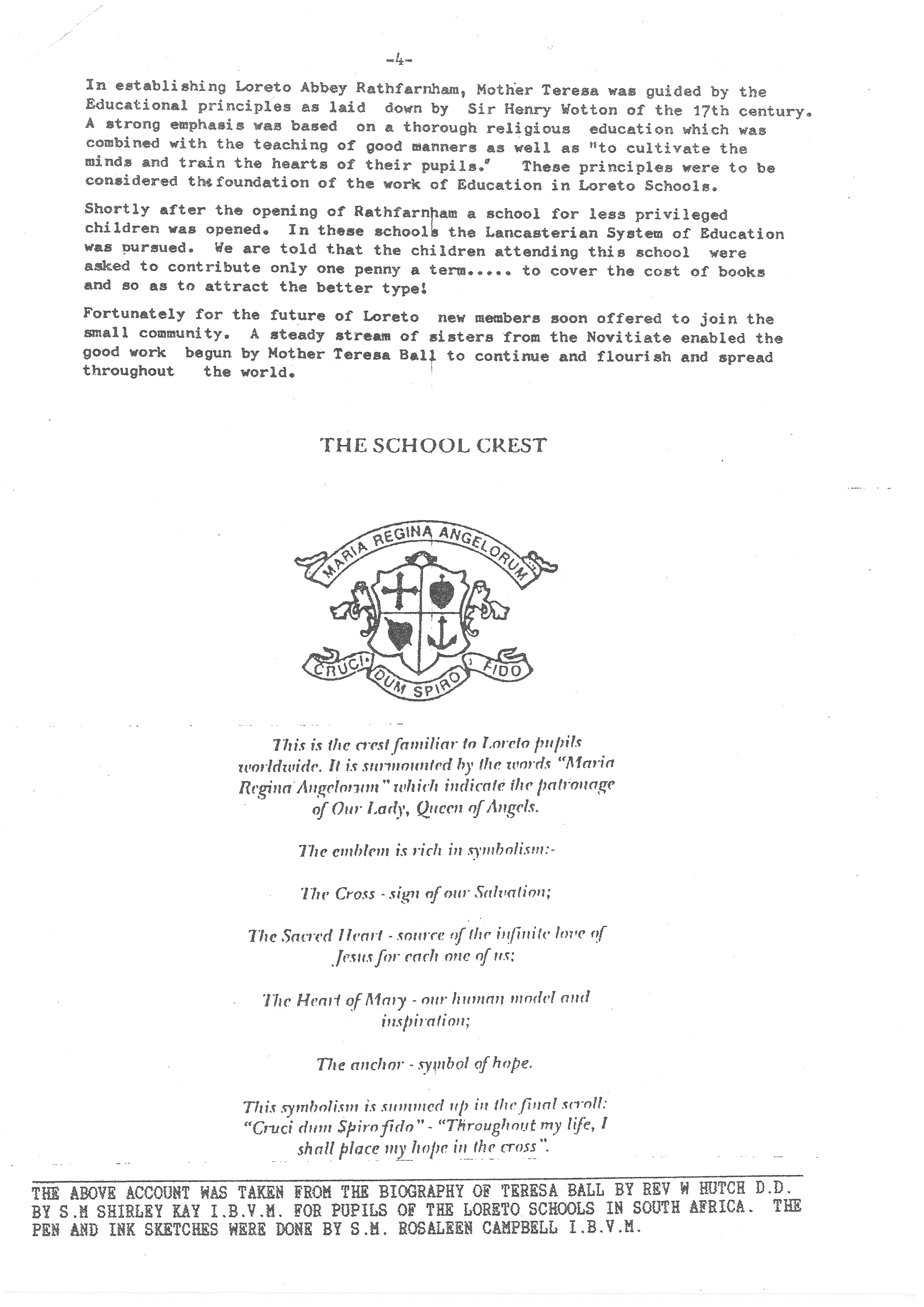
Original Crest - Loreto Convent School

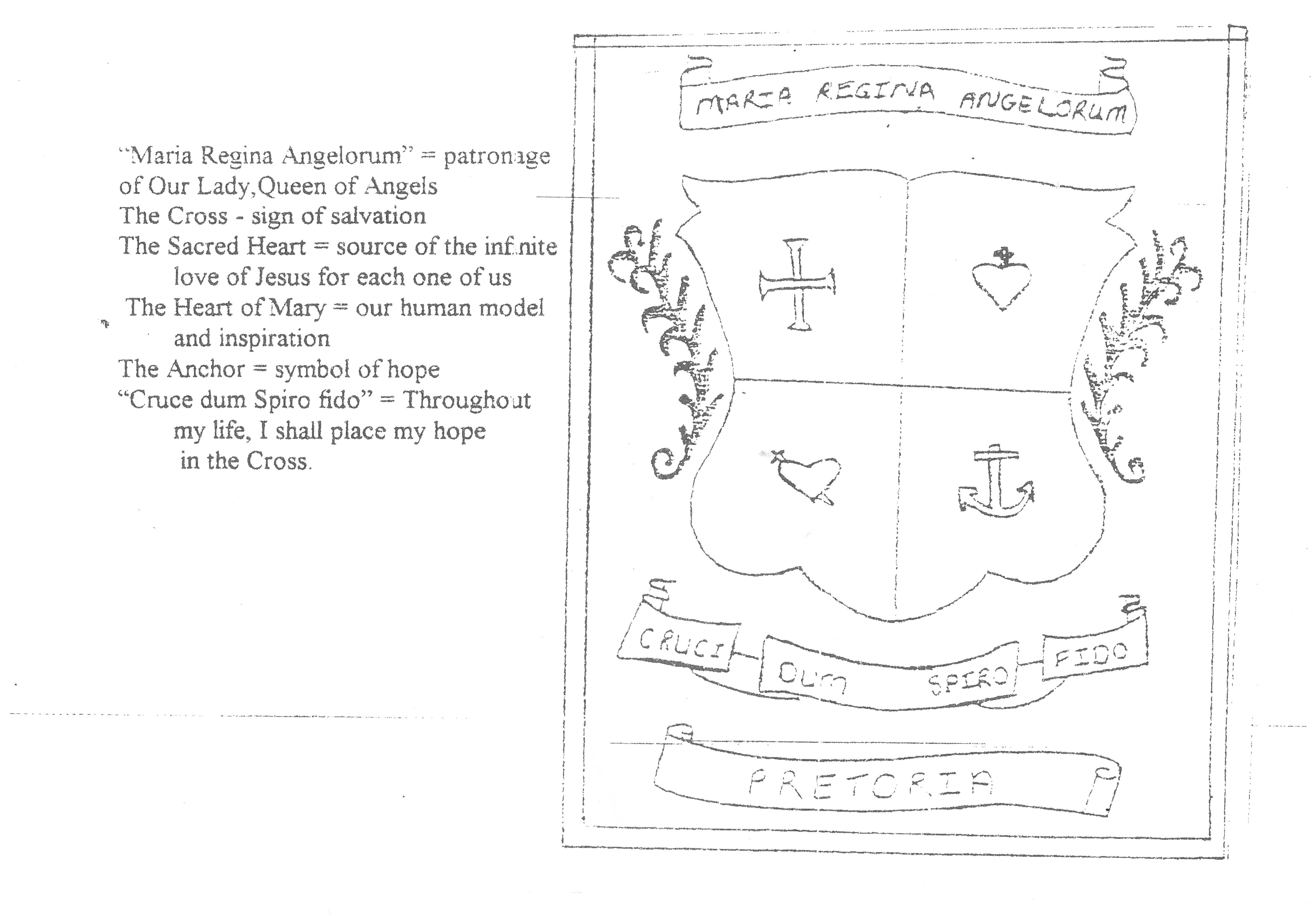
Original Crest Hand Drawn - S.M. Rosaleen Campbell I.B.V.M - Loreto Convent School

The school crest depicts a shield divided into four quarters, surmounted by a scroll bearing the words Maria Regina Angelorum (Latin: "Mary, Queen of Angels"), reflecting the patronage of the Virgin Mary under that title. The four quarters of the shield show the Cross, the Sacred Heart, the Heart of Mary, and an anchor; in the heraldic tradition of the Loreto schools, these are interpreted respectively as the sign of salvation, the source of the love of Jesus, the human exemplar of Mary, and the symbol of hope. Beneath the shield runs a scroll bearing the school's Latin motto, Cruci dum Spiro fido ("Throughout my life, I shall place my hope in the Cross"). The school's English motto is "Learning and Leading in Love and Justice."

== Notable alumnae ==
- Cicely Mayhew, Lady Mayhew (1924–2016), British diplomat and Bletchley Park codebreaker; the Foreign, Commonwealth and Development Office's first female overseas diplomat. Mayhew attended Loreto Convent School from 1929 to 1932.
- Inez Clare Verdoorn (1896–1989), South African botanist and taxonomist; long-serving curator of the National Herbarium of South Africa; author of more than two hundred botanical publications. Verdoorn matriculated from Loreto Convent School in 1916.
- Martha Mokone, appointed in 1990 as the school's first black Head Girl.

== Notable staff ==
- Anne van Zyl, South African education administrator; founding head of St Stithians Girls' College and Stanford Lake College, head of Pretoria High School for Girls (where she led the school's integration prior to the formal end of apartheid), and headmistress of the Oprah Winfrey Leadership Academy for Girls. Van Zyl began her teaching career as a French teacher at Loreto Convent School.

== See also ==
- Sisters of Loreto
- Mary Ward
- Roman Catholic Archdiocese of Pretoria
- Southern African Catholic Bishops' Conference
