= Pretoria High School for Girls =

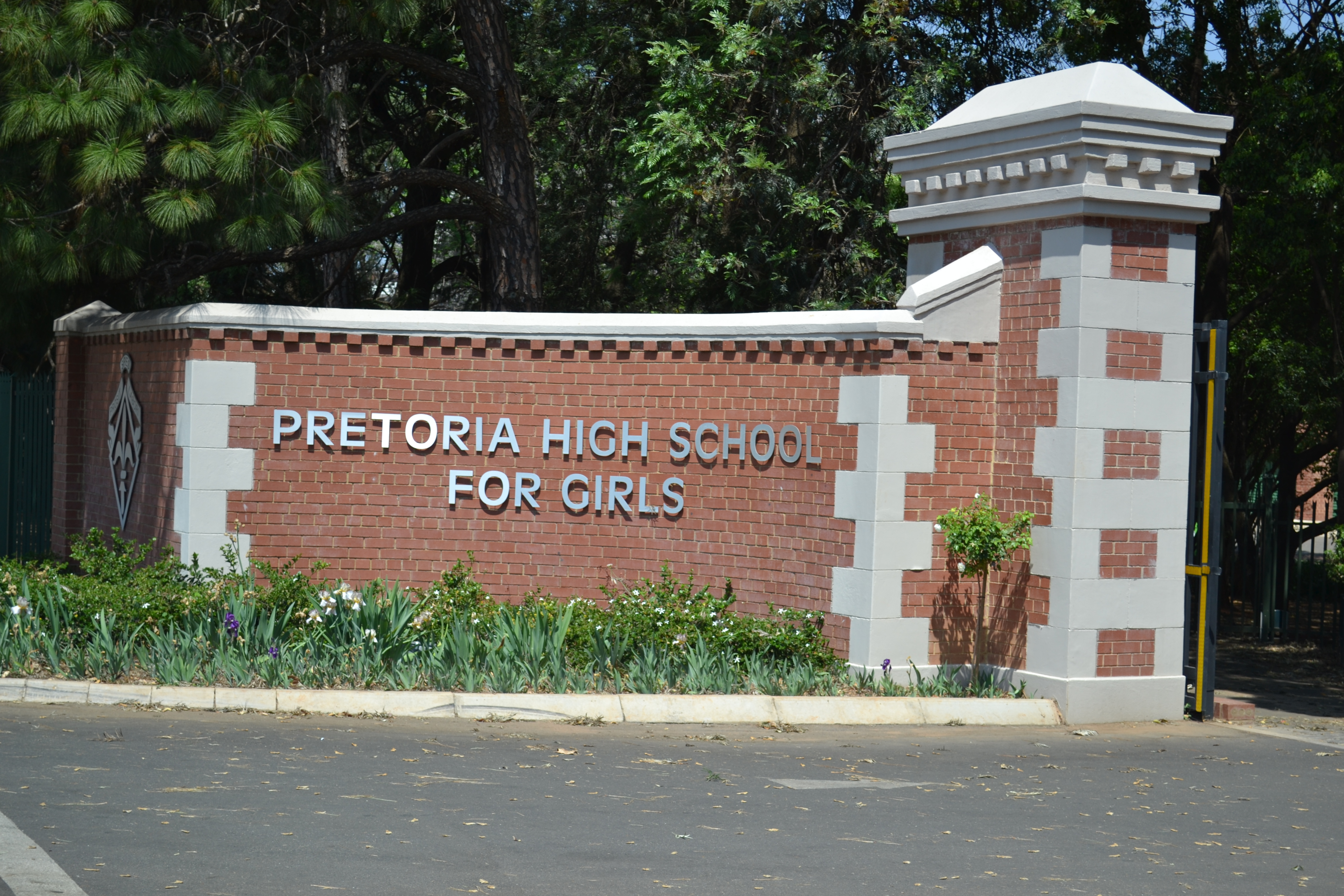
- Pretoria High School for Girls, Park Street Pretoria entrance

Location
- 949 Park Street, Arcadia; Pretoria, Gauteng; South Africa; 25°45′03″S 28°13′35″E

Information
- School type: All girls public school
- Motto: Prosit Spes Labori (We Work in Hope)
- Established: 10 October 1902; 124 years ago
- Founder: Edith Aitken
- Sister school: Pretoria Boys High School
- School district: District 9
- School number: +27 (012) 430 7341
- Headmistress: Philipa Erasmus
- Staff: 100 full-time
- Grades: 8–12
- Gender: Female
- Age: 14 to 18
- Enrollment: 1,300 girls
- Language: English
- Schedule: 07:30 - 14:00
- Campus: Urban Campus
- Campus type: Suburban
- Houses: Boarding houses: North Lodge; School house Daygirl houses: Aitken; Athlone; Buxton; Clarendon; Connaught; Duncan; Gladstone; McWilliam; Selborne; Van Zyl
- Colours: Blue; Green
- Sports: Hockey; Netball; Waterpolo; Tennis; Equestrian; Athletes; Basketball; Squash; Diving; Soccer
- Nickname: Girls High
- Rivals: Afrikaanse Hoër Meisieskool; Jeppe High School for Girls; St. Mary's Diocesan School for Girls
- Accreditation: Gauteng Department of Education
- Yearbook: The Iris
- Feeder schools: Arcadia Primary School; Brooklyn Primary School; Glenstantia Primary School; Hamilton Primary School; La Montagne Primary School; Lynnwood Ridge Primary School; Rietondale Primary School; St Paulus Primary School; Waterkloof Primary School
- Alumni: Old Girls Association
- Website: phsg.org.za

Pretoria High School for Girls (often called PHSG), is a full-government, fee-charging, English-medium high school for girls located in Hatfield, Pretoria, in the Gauteng province of South Africa. It is the sister school to Pretoria Boys High School.

The high school was founded in 1902 by Edith Aitken.

== History ==
=== Second Anglo-Boer War ===
In the 1880s the South African Republic Government built a Staatsmodelschool on the corner of Skinner and van der Walt Streets and a Staatsmeisjesschool (State Girls' School) on Visagie Street. By January 1900, with the war in full swing, the Staatsmeisjesschool had been commissioned as a hospital, while the Staatsmodelschool had been turned into a prison. Sir Winston Churchill was captured by the Boers and imprisoned in the school building, but managed to make his famous escape from there and took the railroad into Portuguese East Africa (Mozambique).

=== Lord Milner and the "Milner Schools" ===
With Pretoria under British control, it became apparent to Lord Milner, the Colonial Secretary at the time, that the educational facilities in the city needed attention as there was no secondary school for English-speaking pupils (and it was Milner's intention to anglicise what would become the Transvaal). The Staatsmodelschool was duly refurbished. It was renamed Pretoria High School and became the first of the so-called "Milner" schools in the Transvaal, opening on 3 June 1901 with Charles Hope, who also founded Potchefstroom High School for Boys, as headmaster. Initial enrollment was 32 pupils, both boys and girls, which increased to 132 by August of that year. The school was to later become Pretoria Boys High School when the girls left.

=== Formation of Pretoria High School for Girls ===
Mr Hope left 15 months later, along with the girls, who were finally accommodated into the old building of the Staatsmeisjesschool. By October 10, 1902, the school opened as Pretoria High School for Girls. It consisted of four teachers and 126 girls under Edith Aitken, but contrary to the name, taught both primary and secondary school pupils until these two groups were separated in 1905. Girls High moved out to its current Hatfield location on 28 July 1915. The primary school continued to occupy the Staatsmeisjesskool premises and is today known as Hamilton School.

=== World War II ===
During the 2nd World War, the school served the community by supplying items to the needy. This tradition has continued into the present day, with many pupils and staff members annually knitting jerseys, which is given to needy members of the community.

=== Apartheid era ===
Pretoria High School for Girls was designated as a "white" school during the apartheid era in South Africa. The school was subject to the government's separate development policies resulting in schools segregated according to government determined racial categories. As a progressive school, Girl's High was one of the first white schools to embrace the "New South Africa". Even before President De Klerk's call for a new South Africa, Clem Sunter had addressed the "high road, low road" vision to integrate. PHSG was the first school under the Transvaal Education Department to open its facilities to pupils from the townships. Teachers here taught Saturday morning classes to 50 standard 9 pupils as part of St Mary's DSG Outreach Program.

It was one of the first public schools to integrate during the transition period in South Africa from a political system of apartheid to a multiparty, multi-racial democracy. The school hoped to finally, legally realise its multi-racial dimension in its charter (" earnest hope that here girls of different races and different denominations might meet") as apartheid began to be dismantled. The first black pupil was admitted to Girls High in 1990 and was the daughter of a Malawian diplomat, SP Kachipande. After that, a student vote where 80% of the students voted for PHSG to transition to an "open school" to enable it to admit South Africans from all races. The year after, a few more students from the Malawian embassy enrolled in the school and thereafter South Africans from other races. PHSG became the first white state school in Northern Transvaal (now Gauteng) to open its doors to girls of all races. During this time, the school was under the leadership of Ms. Ann Van Zyl, who later became headmistress of the prestigious St Stithians Girls College in Johannesburg and Oprah Winfrey Leadership Academy for Girls. By 1994, the school opened its doors to black South African students and became fully integrated. Apartheid was fully dismantled as the legal system in 1994.

=== Headmistresses ===
- Edith Aitken (1902–1923)
- Jean F McWilliam
- Winifred Hawkins
- Minnie Neave (1930–1946)
- Eileen Nelson (1946–1970)
- Beryl Mullins (1971–1988)
- Anne Van Zyl (1989–1995)
- Alison Kitto (1995–2002)
- Penny A McNair (2003–2014)
- Karen du Toit (2015–2017)
- Phillipa Erasmus (2018–present)

== Present day ==
=== Reputation ===
Girls High is a state school that is supported by influential people and organizations. It includes the children of Minister of finance Pravin Gordhan's and Minister of health Aaron Motsoaledi's daughters. The school has also had patronage from the diplomatic community, including diplomats from Chile, Malawi, Uruguay, and other countries. It was voted by the Pretoria News as the best high school in Pretoria.

=== Academics ===
PHSG is one of the top schools in Gauteng in academic achievement. They are listed in the department of education's top 100 list. PHSG has a rigorous academic curriculum, from 2004–2009, they have had a 100% Matriculation pass rate. PHSG also won the Most Improved Schools Awards of 2007 together with 10 other schools around the country. They won a prize for Excellence in Mathematics because 138 students attained a higher grade maths pass mark. It is in the top 5 public schools in the province.

In 2009, the school had a 99.9 percent Matric pass rate. The school has also been recognized as a circle of Excellence School by the Allan Gray Investment Management.

=== Motto ===
The motto of the School is We work in hope, and has a Latin equivalent, Prosit Spes Labori.

=== Coat of arms ===
In 1936, the school's coat of arms was registered with the Department of the Interior as a "badge" under the Protection of Names, Uniforms and Badges Act 1935. In 1990, after slight improvement, it was registered at the Bureau of Heraldry under the Heraldry Act 1962. The registration certificate was presented to the school by Frederick Brownell, the State Herald at that time. The school magazine of that year includes an explanation of the coat of arms. Heraldic practice in English tradition is to depict the arms of unmarried ladies or widows on a lozenge, a diamond shaped shield. The lozenge makes a bold heraldic statement about feminism. By 1990 only three schools, Girton College in Cambridge, St Patricks Girls High School, Canada and PHSG were known to display their arms on lozenges. Nowadays, however, to judge from its website, Girton College displays its arms on a shield.

=== Hostels ===
- North Lodge (on campus)
- School House (on campus)
- St Alban's Hostel (off campus Farenden and Pretorious Street) - this hostel has been closed since 2008. This hostel was built in 1928 and given to PHSG by the Holy Christ Church next door. It was supported by the Vatican Emissary (embassy) in Pretoria. The building is still owned by PHSG and is a protected site.

== Controversy ==
In August 2016 the school was accused of racial discrimination policies where black students were treated differently from white students. These were policies ranging from black girls being forced to straighten their hair, rules that disallowed afros to being accused of conspiring when standing in groups and speaking in their mother tongue. The black students protested at the school's annual Spring Fair, despite the presence of heavy security. Supporters were urged to use the hashtag #StopRacismAtPretoriaGirlsHigh. This led to a huge outcry on social media and solidarity from the South African public. South African Arts and Culture Minister Nathi Mthethwa wrote on Twitter: "Let us continue to assert our Africanness in all spaces so that we can breathe & be truly, fully ourselves." Patrick Gaspard, US ambassador to South Africa, also tweeted: "All societies have rules. And sometimes those rules are biased and need to be exposed and protested." An online petition had almost 25,000 signatures within a day. Gauteng Education MEC, Panyaza Lesufi, met with the school management to address the issues. The controversy has been covered internationally by Al Jazeera and the BBC.

== Notable former pupils ==
=== Notable alumnae ===
- Myfanwy Bekker-Balajadia – artist
- Sheila Camerer – politician
- Nan Cross – anti-apartheid and anti-conscription activist
- Bridgette Hartley – sprint canoer; bronze medal K-1500m, 2012 Olympics
- Claudia Henkel – Miss South Africa 2004
- Muriel Horrell – race relations researcher
- Cythna Letty – botanical artist
- Oti Mabuse – professional dancer
- Judith Mason née Menge – artist
- Rosie Motene - actress, author and activist
- Zulaikha Patel – anti-racism activist
- Deanna Petherbridge – artist, writer and curator
- Margaret Roberts – herbalist and writer
- Jacqueline Roumeguere-Eberhardt – anthropologist
- Gertrud Theiler – parasitologist
- Ellaphie Ward-Hilhorst – botanical artist
- Relebogile Mabotja - Actress and radio personality
- Magda Wierzycka - CEO Sygnia
- Margaret Hunt - Tennis player
