= Pretoria Boys High School =

Public school in Gauteng, South Africa

- Badge of Pretoria Boys High School

Location
- 251 Roper Street, Brooklyn; Pretoria, Gauteng 0028; South Africa; 25°45′38″S 28°13′26″E

Information
- School type: All-boys public school
- Motto: Latin: Virtute et Labore ("Virtute et Labore”)
- Established: 3 June 1901; 125 years ago
- Founder: Alfred Milner, 1st Viscount Milner
- Sister school: Pretoria High School for Girls
- Headmaster: Greg Hassenkamp
- Second master: Craig McBride
- Staff: 100 full-time
- Grades: Forms I-V (grades 8–12)
- Gender: Male
- Age: 14 to 18
- Enrollment: 1,500
- Language: English
- Schedule: 07:30 - 14:15
- Hours in school day: 6 h 35 min
- Campuses: 2
- Campus: Main Campus; Pollock Campus
- Campus type: Urban
- Houses: Boarding houses: Rissik House; Solomon House; School house Dayboy houses: Abernethy House; Arcadia House; Armstrong House; Hofmeyr House; Matheson House; Sunnyside House; Town House
- Colours: Red; White; Green
- Slogan: 'Tis Here We Learn To Live'
- Song: 'Tis Here We Learn To Live'
- Mascot: smallest form 1(grade 8) boy
- Nickname: Boys High
- Accreditation: Gauteng Department of Education
- Newspaper: The Phobian; The Boys Highlights
- Yearbook: The Pretorian
- School fees: R91,800 (boarding); R76,900 (tuition)
- Website: www.boyshigh.com
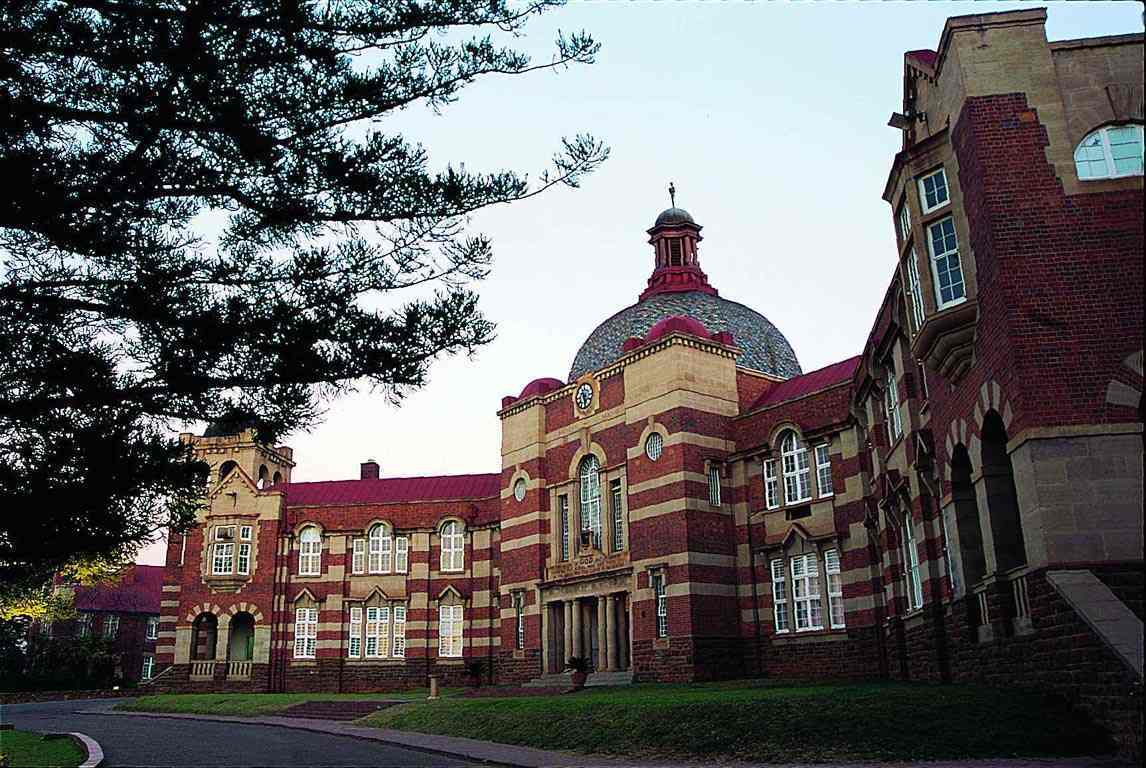
- Main school building (1909)

Pretoria Boys High School (colloquially known as "Boys High") is a public, tuition-charging, English-medium high school for boys situated in the suburb of Brooklyn in Pretoria in the Gauteng province of South Africa, founded in 1901 by Alfred Milner, 1st Viscount Milner.

The school enrols over 1,500 pupils, including 300 boarders, from South Africa and beyond, managed by about 100 full-time staff.

Though the school itself was founded in 1901, its neoclassical red-brick style main school buildings date from 1909, maintaining provincial heritage site status. A new media centre, library and music centre was completed in 2016. The 40-hectare school grounds also include a second campus, 'Pollock Campus', as well as sporting and recreational facilities. Three boarding houses are located on the school grounds: Rissik House and Solomon House are part of the original school complex completed in 1909, while School House was built later in 1920. Its sister school is Pretoria High School for Girls, founded in 1902.Its brother school is Maritzburg College, founded in 1863.

== History ==
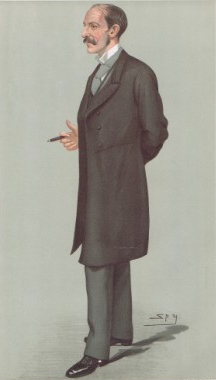
A caricature of Alfred Milner, 1st Viscount Milner (1854–1925), founder of the Pretoria Boys High School (Vanity Fair, 1897)

The antecedent of the current school is the historic Staats Model School, built 1896-1897 by the government of the Zuid-Afrikaansche Republiek (later Transvaal) in central Pretoria. Alfred Fernández Harington was appointed English master on 1 October 1895. The school was not in operation for very long owing to the outbreak of the Second Boer War in 1899. At the time, the building served as a prison, where notably Winston Churchill was briefly imprisoned.

The school was part of the whites-only education system, until the abolition of apartheid.

=== Pretoria High School (1901–1903) ===
With Pretoria under British control, it became apparent to Lord Milner, the Colonial Secretary at the time, that the educational facilities in the city needed attention as there was no secondary school for English-speaking pupils. The Staats Model School was duly refurbished. It was renamed Pretoria High School and became the first of the so-called Milner schools in the Transvaal, opening on 3 June 1901 with Charles Hope - who also founded Potchefstroom Boys High - as headmaster. Initial enrolment was 32 pupils, both boys and girls, which increased to 132 by August of that year. Hope left 15 months later, along with the girls, who were finally accommodated into the old building of the former Transvaal Republic's Staatsmeischjeskool (State Girls' School), which was renamed Pretoria High School for Girls.

=== Pretoria College (1903–1909) ===
Under the new headmaster, Harold Atkinson, enrolment increased to 100 boys by 1903. The name of the school was also changed to Pretoria College. Atkinson left at the end of 1905 and was succeeded by J F Acheson who stayed with the school until it moved from Skinner Street to its current site in 1909. Formal devolution between primary and high school pupils only occurred in 1905.

=== The new buildings and bilingualism (1910-1920) ===
Milner's intention was to create a stable educational infrastructure in the new colony's capital and duly set aside 200 hectares (490 acres) of ground to the south-east of central Pretoria for the construction of new academic institutions. The southernmost 60 hectares (150 acres), which included the Waterkloof Kop (English: Waterkloof Hill), was chosen as the new site for Pretoria Boys High School. The architect, Patrick Eagle, met the challenge by designing an edifice rivalling its larger contemporary, Sir Herbert Baker's Union Buildings.

The new school buildings were officially opened in 1909 by Jan Smuts, then colonial secretary of the Transvaal. The main building of the school, sited on Waterkloof Hill, is at present close to University of Pretoria, sitting opposite to the distant Union Buildings on Meintjieskop. One year later, the four colonies of the Transvaal, Orange River Colony, Natal and the Cape formed the Union of South Africa. Keen to forge unity between English and Dutch (Afrikaner) South Africans, Smuts' influence was evident when, on 6 April 1910, the school absorbed 100 boys and staff from the Dutch-medium Eendracht High School to form a dual-medium high school. The combined school was now named Pretoria High School for Boys - Pretoria Hogere school voor Jongens. Smuts would later send his own sons to the school.

=== Devolution and re-establishment (1920) ===
The dual-medium institution would last ten years. By 1920, the divide between English and Afrikaans speakers had become apparent nationwide; this was reflected in the need for a separate Afrikaans high school in Pretoria. Consequently, the Afrikaanse Hoër Seunskool was formed immediately south of its parent, becoming the first Afrikaans-medium high school in the country, several years before Afrikaans attained official recognition as a language.

=== Headmasters since 1909 ===
- William Hofmeyr (1909–1935)
- Daniel Matheson (1936–1949)
- Noel Pollock (1950–1955)
- Desmond Abernethy (1956–1973)
- Malcolm Armstrong (1974–1989)
- William E. Schroder (1990–2009)
- Anthony Reeler (2010-June 2020)
- Gregary Hassenkamp (July 2020-)

== School ==
Coat of arms of the school, with motto: Latin: Virtute et Labore; English: "Through Courage and Labour".

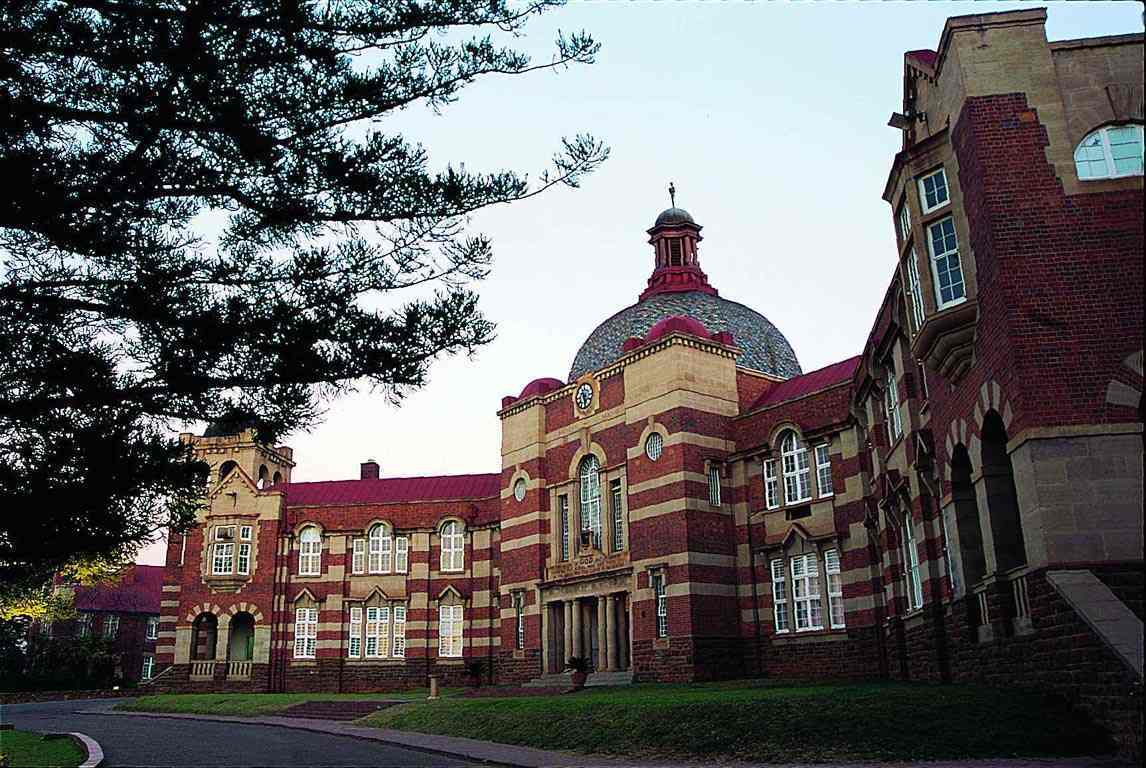
Main school building of Pretoria Boys High School, dating from 1909

=== Heraldry ===
According to Illsley, each component of the badge has a special meaning relating to the history and spirit of the school. The shield component of the badge is divided into four quadrants, with the book representing learning, the tools the wealth of the Transvaal through gold mining, the tree growth and the ox wagon the Transvaal. The background colours of the four quadrants were the colours of the first four houses when given permanent names, i.e. Town red, Solomon gold, Sunnyside black and Rissik green.

== Culture and activities ==
=== Cultural activities ===
Cultural activities include a well-established musical tradition, as well as a plethora of clubs and societies. These include photography, fantasy and historical war games, aeronautical, film, wildlife, drama, debating, chess, public speaking, creative writing and science clubs. The school newspaper "Boys Highlights" is published and distributed each term.

The school's Music Centre is regarded as one of the best in the country. The following ensembles frequently perform at school functions and external events:

- Symphony orchestra
- Big band
- Dixie band
- String quartet
- Brass choir
- Clarinet ensemble
- Saxophone ensemble
- The Salon Boys
- "Boere Orkes"
- Pipe band
- Choir
- Vocal ensemble also known as the Harmonics

=== Athletics and leisure ===
Sporting facilities include soccer, rugby union, cricket, Olympic standard athletics grounds, tennis, squash and basketball courts, a gymnasium, hockey fields, two swimming pools including one for waterpolo, an AstroTurf and a rock-climbing wall. There is also a man-made pine forest, an old shooting range which has been converted for the purpose of archery, an amphitheatre and an artificial lake, Loch Armstrong. The grounds form a protected bird sanctuary and are home to several different species of birds, fish, amphibians and reptiles.

=== Sport ===
The school offers coaching and facilities for several sports on-campus, including Archery, Athletics, Basketball, Chess, Cricket, Cross country, Cycling, Climbing, Fencing, Golf, Hockey, Mountain biking, Rowing, Rugby, Rugby sevens, Football (soccer), Squash, Swimming, Table tennis, Tennis, and Water polo.

== School buildings ==
The new school buildings were officially opened in 1909 by Jan Smuts, then colonial secretary of the Transvaal. The main building of the school, sited on Waterkloof Hill, is at present close to University of Pretoria, sitting opposite to the distant Union Buildings on Meintjieskop.

=== Houses ===
Pretoria Boys High School is made up of ten constituent houses, each with its own culture and identity. House assemblies are held weekly, and house prefects are appointed annually. Annual inter-house sports meetings take place in which every pupil is encouraged to participate. The inter-house swim meet (gala) is the most popular and well-attended of sport meetings.

=== Boarding houses ===
- Solomon
- Rissik
- School

=== Day-boy houses ===
- Abernethy
- Arcadia
- Armstrong
- Hofmeyr
- Matheson
- Sunnyside
- Town

== The Old Boys Association ==
Pretoria Boys High School has a network of Old Boys, forming one of the largest alumni organisations in South Africa. Pretoria Boys High School Old Boys Association publishes an annual journal and review, The Phobian, which is distributed to Old Boys across the globe. Members of the association meet annually at the school for the annual dinner, and regular reunions of each matriculating group are organised 10, 20, 30 and 40 years on, echoing the refrain of the school song, Forty Years On.

== Notable alumni ==
The school has produced two Nobel Prize laureates, eighteen Rhodes scholars, eight Supreme Court judges, an archbishop, two English Premier League football players, seven national cricketers and four Springbok rugby players.

=== Science, Business and Academia ===
- Max Theiler (1899–1972), Nobel Prize laureate for physiology or medicine 1951 who produced the vaccine against yellow fever;
- Charles Kimberlin Brain (C. K. 'Bob' Brain) (1931–2023), paleontologist, cave taphonomist
- Jack Spence (1931–2025), British academic, Professor of Diplomacy at the Department of War Studies, King's College London
- David Epstein (born 1937), mathematician and Fellow of the Royal Society
- Ian Goldin (born 1937), Professor of Globalisation and Development at Balliol College, Oxford, director of the Oxford Martin Research Programmes
- Michael Levitt (born 1947), Nobel Prize laureate for chemistry 2013 attended the school for two years
- Elon Musk (born 1971), internet, space, electric car, renewable energy entrepreneur, Fellow of the Royal Society and former Senior Adviser to Donald Trump.
- Bernard Kantor (born 1949), co-founder of Investec Bank.
- Ian Kantor (born 1945), co-founder of Investec Bank.
- Nick Dreyer (class of 1996), co-founder of Veldskoen Shoes.
- Ross Zondagh (class of 1996), co-founder of Veldskoen Shoes.

=== Literature, Law and Politics ===
- Bernard Friedman (1896–1984), politician, writer, surgeon and founder of the Progressive Party
- Oscar Galgut (1906–1999), former judge of the Supreme Court of Appeal of South Africa
- Vause Raw (1921–2001), South African politician and leader of the New Republic Party (NRP)
- Brian Galgut (born 1936), Deputy Judge President of the KwaZulu-Natal High Court
- Peter Hain (born 1950), British Cabinet Minister
- Edwin Cameron (born 1953), Constitutional Court judge and AIDS activist
- George Laurence KC (born 1946), UCT and Oxford, Rhodes and Harmsworth Scholar. Leading KC in the UK on countryside cases
- Billy Downer (born 1956), Advocate of the Supreme Court, National Prosecutor and Rhodes scholar
- Damon Galgut (born 1963), author, winner of the 2021 Booker Prize
- Dennis Jensen (born 1962), Australian politician and member of the Australian House of Representatives
- Richard Kunzmann (born 1976), novelist
- Duduzane Zuma (born 1982), son of former South African president, Jacob Zuma, and prominent acolyte of the Gupta family accused of corruption and the negligent death of a pedestrian.

=== Art and Entertainment ===
- Gerard Moerdijk (1890–1958), architect best known for designing the Voortrekker Monument
- Nico Panagio (born 1973), actor/presenter
- Werner Bronkhorst (born 2001), artist

=== Sport ===
- Eddie Barlow, South African cricketer
- Jackie Botten, South African cricketer
- Philip Evans, South African national football player
- Mark Fish, South Africa international football player
- Ken Funston, South African cricketer and hockey player
- Glen Hall, South African cricketer
- Simon Harmer, South African cricketer
- Aiden Markram, South African cricketer and captain of the 2014 U-19 Cricket World Cup winning side and 2025 World Test Championship
- Brian Liebenberg, French Rugby Union international
- Chris Morris, South African cricketer
- Oscar Pistorius, 100m Paralympic sprint champion (Beijing, 2008) and convicted murderer, having shot his girlfriend Reeva Steenkamp.
- Chiliboy Ralepelle, Springbok Rugby player
- John Smit, captain of the RWC 2007 winning Springbok team
- JP Ferreira, international rugby coach
- Francois Viljoen, U.S. men's national rugby union Eagles player
- Rik de Voest, professional South African tennis player
- Tucker Vorster, South African tennis player
- Roy Wegerle, US international football (soccer) player.
- Corbin Bosch, South African cricketer
- Donovan Ferreira, South African cricketer
- Tyler Mason, Bath rugby player and U20 Blue Bulls player
