= Bridge House School =

Location
- Franschhoek, Western Cape; South Africa
- Coordinates: 33°52′44.43″S 19°01′49.87″E

Information
- Type: Private, Boarding
- Motto: Learning for Life
- Established: 1995
- Locale: Rural
- Head of school: David Clark
- Exam board: IEB
- Grades: 0000 - 12
- Age range: 2 to 18 years
- Enrollment: 800 boys and girls
- Language: English
- Colors: Navy, white and royal blue
- Website: www.bridgehouse.org.za

Bridge House School, commonly referred to as Bridge House, is a school in South Africa. It is located in the Cape Winelands close to Franschhoek, Stellenbosch and Paarl, and is an independent day and boarding school for over eight hundred girls and boys from Playschool to Grade 12. Bridge House is a member of the Independent Schools Association of Southern Africa (ISASA) and the International Round Square Organisation. The School motto is "Learning for Life".

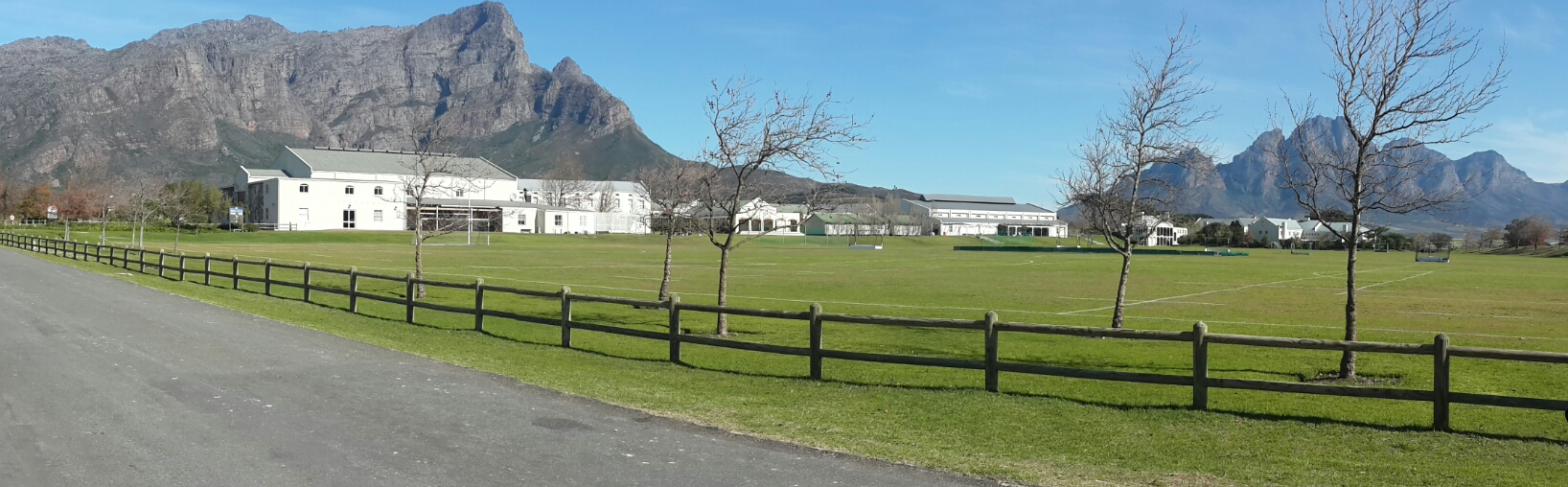
Bridge House School

== History ==
=== Founding ===
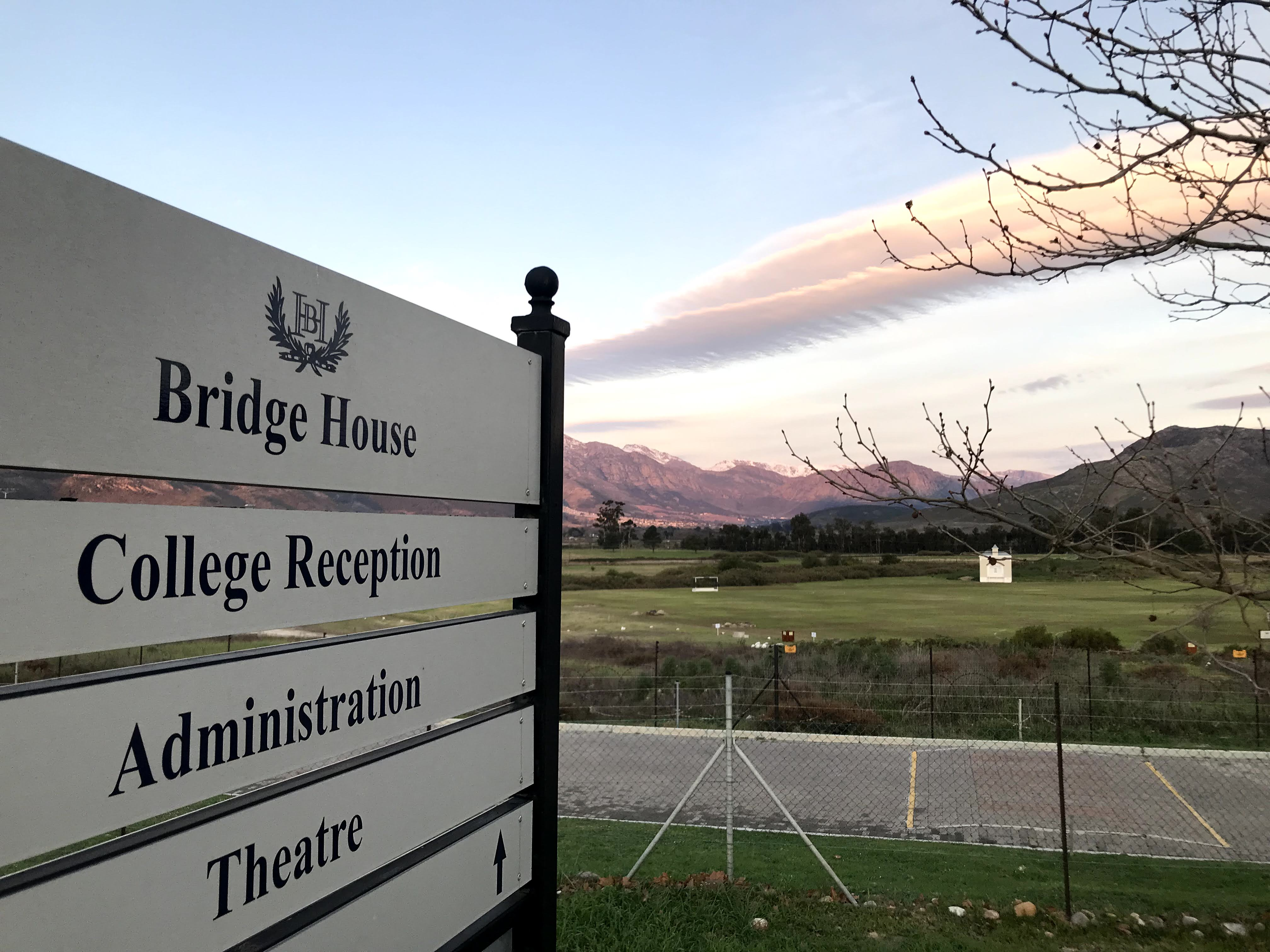
Signboard at the entrance of Bridge House School

Bridge House was founded by a group of local families, namely the Huxter, Friedman and Rands families, as a non-profit company and opened its doors on 19 January 1995 with 54 pupils. The school was originally based in a state school building in Simondium until 1997. Rezoning applications were brought forth and approved for the school to occupy new premises in the Berg River Valley on the Waterval Farm.

=== Facilities development ===
- 1994: South African businessman Graham Beck donates a 10-hectare site, comprising an undeveloped corner of the farm Waterfall, near the Berg River Bridge, ten kilometres outside of Franschhoek on the way to Paarl and Stellenbosch.
- 1998: The school relocates to the new campus.
- 1999: Swimming pool, beginners' pool, tennis courts, indoor sports centre.
- 2003: The Barnyard Theatre, a new College block with seven new classrooms, College Reception and Administrative Offices.
- 2004: A new boarding house called "Waterfall", for boys and girls in two separate wings.
- 2008: A second boarding house for boys, "Bellegam".
- 2012: An additional 18 hectares donated by Graham Beck, increasing the campus size to its current 28 hectares.
- 2013: The Renaissance Centre and another boarding house, "Huguenot", for junior boys and girls.
- 2015: Pre-Primary School building.
- 2016: Water-based field hockey AstroTurf facilities.
- 2017: College Maths and Science Centre and a fourth boarding house, "Erica".
- 2019: "Tim Rands" cricket oval.

=== Heads of School ===
1. Lloyd Smuts (1995)
2. Allan Graham (1997)
3. Anne van Zyl (2002)
4. Mike Russell (2010)
5. David Clark (2020)
