= Anne van Zyl =

South African educator academic

Anne van Zyl is a South African education administrator from Cape Town, South Africa. She is the headmistress of the Oprah Winfrey Leadership Academy for Girls. She has also been headmistress at five different schools including Pretoria High School for Girls, St. Stithians College, Stanford Lake College and Bridge House School. She is known in academic circles for her work in education, including the integration of Pretoria High School for Girls which became the first segregated white state school in the Northern Transvaal to open its doors to all races during apartheid when integrated state schools were still illegal.

== Early education ==
Van Zyl went to high school at St Cyprian's, Cape Town. After graduation, she went on an exchange student program to San Mateo High School in California under the American Field Service program. She briefly attended Stellenbosch University but eventually received her French and English degree from the University of Cape Town. After graduation she traveled to France to work and attend classes at the Sorbonne University. When she returned to South Africa, she worked at Loreto Convent part-time whilst obtaining her diploma and a BEd degree majoring in Educational Management from the University of South Africa.

=== Early education career ===
Van Zyl began her education career as a French teacher at Loreto Convent School in Pretoria. She then taught English at Pretoria High School for Girls (PHSG) where she remained for the next few years and gained responsibilities. She soon moved up the ranks by becoming, Head of Department of English and then Deputy Head. By 1988 she had become Principal of Pretoria High School for Girls.

In 1990 she was instrumental in the move which saw Pretoria Girls High becoming the first state school in the Northern Transvaal Province (present day Gauteng) to admit girls of all races before apartheid was legally dismantled. The first Black student to be admitted was the daughter of a Malawian diplomat, Percy Kachipande.

=== Later education career ===
She was appointed Founder Head of St Stithian's Collegiate in 1995. In 2001 she became Head of Stanford Lake College in Magoebaskloof, Limpopo Province. In 2003 she became the Head of Bridge House School in Franschhoek. St. Stitihians became the first South African School to be accepted as members of the Round Square International movement because of its emphasis on "internationalism, democracy, environmental awareness, adventure, leadership and service (IDEALS)". Stanford Lake College and Bridge House School, soon followed by achieving the distinction as Round Square International members under her leadership. She has also worked as an Examiner for English literature and been a member of the Assessment Committee of the IEB (Independent Examinations Board). She achieved international acclaim when she became the headmistress of the Oprah Winfrey Leadership Academy for Girls, an independent school founded by Oprah Winfrey that opened in 2007, offering education for girls from low income backgrounds. She was appointed Head of the Academy in January 2010. She took over in 2010 after controversies surrounding former headmistress, Tiny Virginia Makopo.

== Achievements ==
- St Mary's DSG – Board member
- Mitchell House – Board member
- Penryn College – Board member
- International Board of Round Square member
- St Cyprian's Council – Member
