= Staats Model School =

School in the Republic of South Africa

Coordinates: 25°45′00″S 28°11′38″E

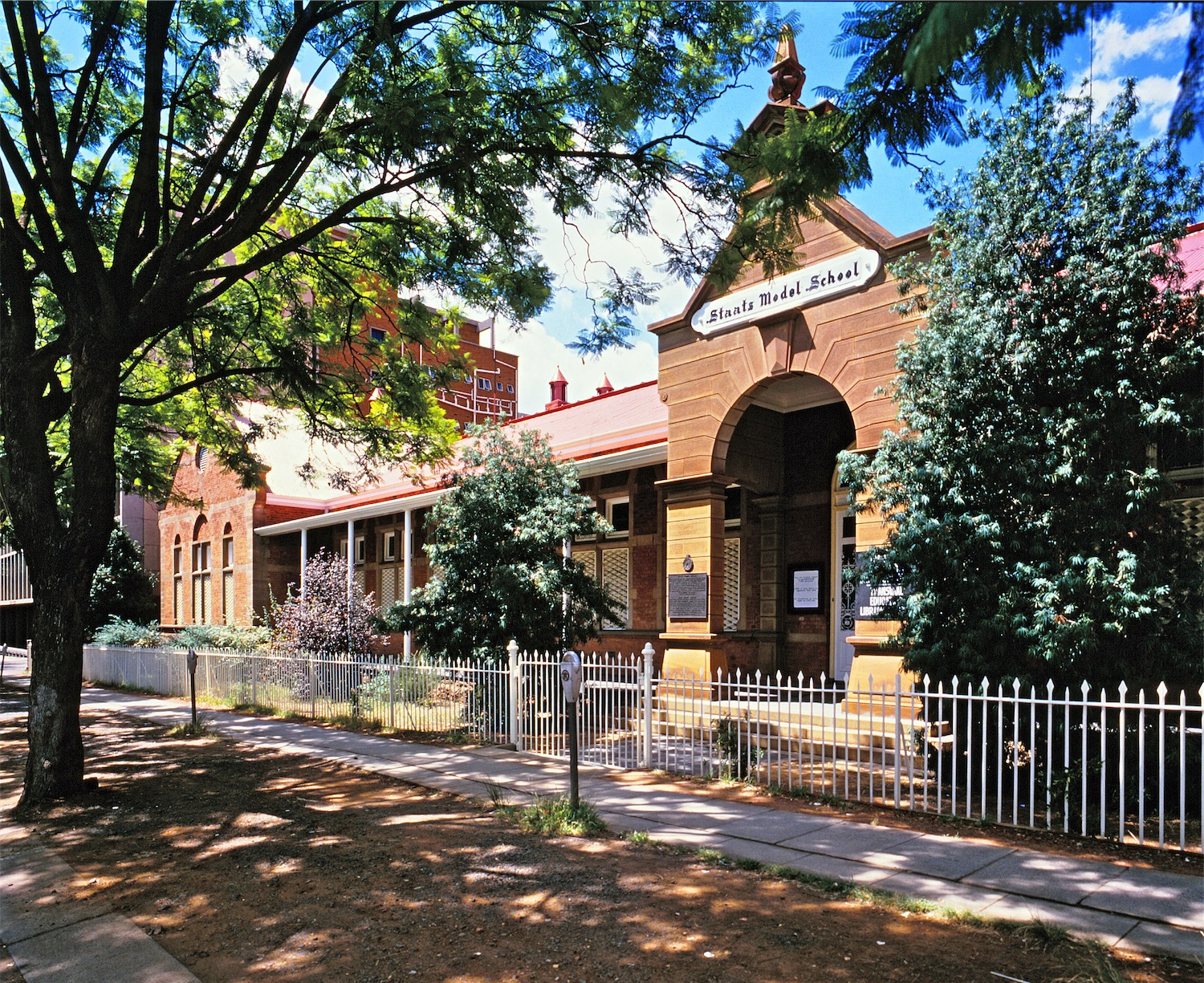
View from Van der Walt / Lilian Ngoyi street

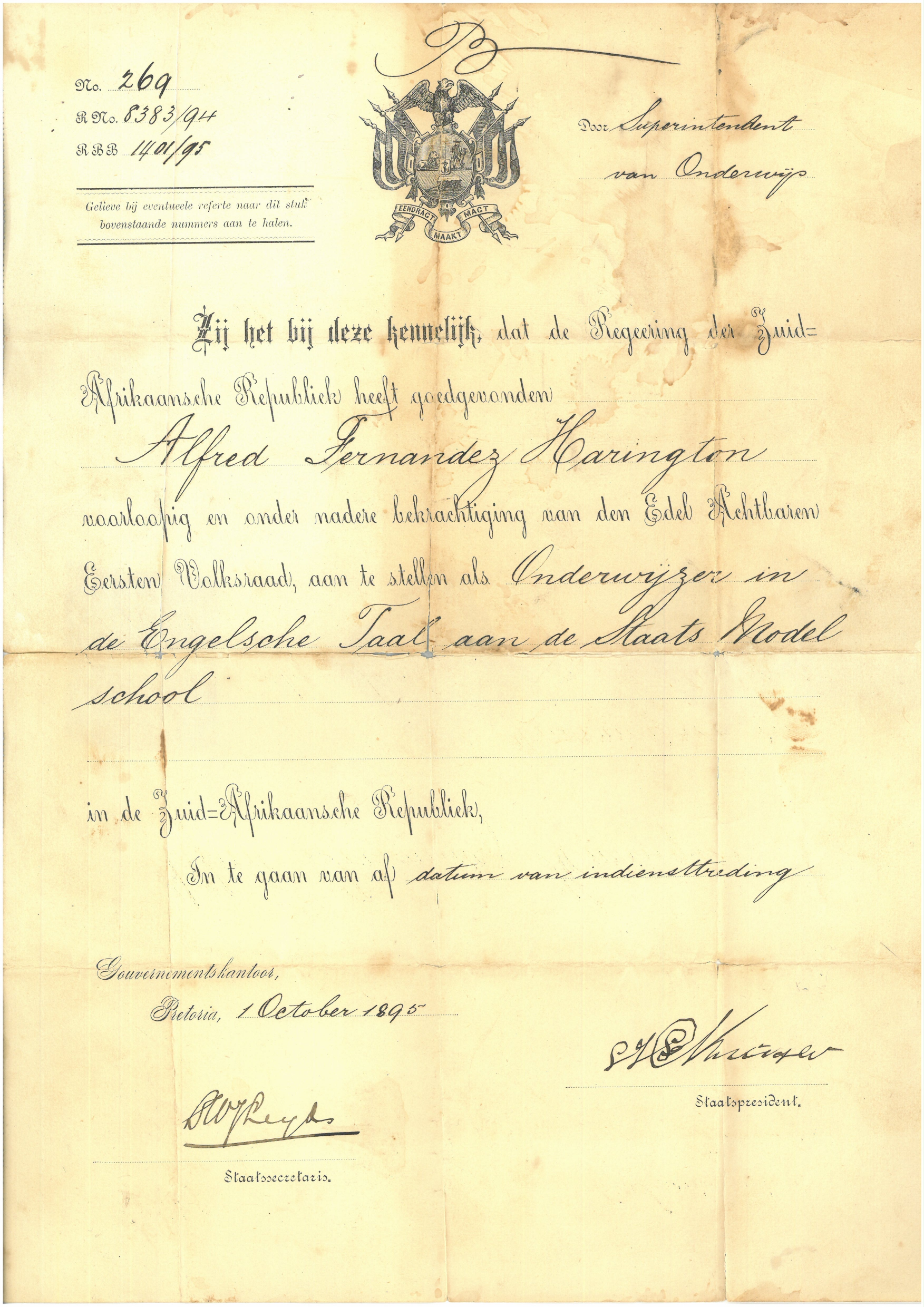
Appointment of Alfred Fernandez Harington as English master on 1 October 1895.

The Staats Model School is situated on the corner of Lilian Ngoyi (previously Van der Walt) and Nana Sita (previously Skinner) Streets in Pretoria, Gauteng Province, Republic of South Africa. It originated from a school established in 1893 to train teachers in the Zuid Afrikaansche Republik, or ZAR. Alfred Fernandez Harington was appointed English master on 1 October 1895.

Sytze Wierda, chief architect of the ZAR, designed the building in 1895, and its construction was completed by Te Groen in 1896. The structure consists of brick and Stinkwater sandstone and adheres to the Neo Dutch Renaissance school of architecture.

On 11 October 1899 the school closed as a result of the outbreak of the Anglo-Boer War. During the war the building functioned as a hospital for Boer soldiers and as a prison for British officers. The escape of Winston Churchill, war correspondent and later British prime minister, from the building has become legend.

The school regained some life from 1901 as Pretoria High School, and from 1902 to 1909 as the Pretoria College for Boys, which later became Pretoria Boys High School. In 1910 the college moved to larger premises and the Staats Model School building housed several other schools after that, including, in 1946, the ‘Hamilton Primary School’ (Robert Hamilton was a well-known businessman and benefactor of the school). The Library Services of the Transvaal Education Department, or TED, moved in during 1951.

The building was declared a national monument on 8 April 1960.
