= Zulaikha Patel =

South African anti-racism activist (born 2002)

Zulaikha Patel (born 2002) is a South African anti-racism activist. She became a symbol of the fight against Pretoria Girls High School's policy regarding Black girls' hair in 2016, at the age of 13. She and her classmates held a demonstration that led to not only a change in school policy but also an inquiry into allegations of racism at the school. She is quoted as saying, "Asking me to change my hair is like asking me to erase my blackness."

== Early life ==
Zulaikha Patel was born in South Africa into a biracial family with Black South African and Indian heritage. During her early childhood, her parents’ interracial marriage was also frequently questioned. She shared that growing up, she felt like she did not belong to either side of her family. As a child, her first experience of racism came from her Indian family and linguistic barriers continued to separate them. Also, people in her mother’s village criticized her for her hair, which resulted in early conversations and reflections about her curly hair.

== Protest ==
Pretoria Girls' High School is located in Pretoria, Republic of South Africa. The school was founded in 1902 and was all white since its founding until 1990, as South African schools were segregated before apartheid, but since 1990, the school has been open to all races. According to CNN, Pretoria Girls' Code of Conduct does not specifically mention afros, but it does lay out rules for general appearance, including prescribing that all styles "should be conservative, neat and in keeping with the school uniform." Teachers had told the students that their Afro hair is "exotic" and needed to be tamed. It was implied that girls' hair needed to be straightened or tied back, not worn as Afros.

Zulaikha Patel was among the students who led a demonstration against Pretoria Girls High, against the all-girls school's hair policy.

== Aftermath ==
In a 2017 case study on school governance, Section 27 documented how the 2016 protest at Pretoria High School for Girls grew out of students’ everyday experiences with the school’s appearance rules. Although the code of conduct emphasized values such as Ubuntu, equality, and inclusivity, learners reported that these principles often felt disconnected from how the rules were enforced. After the incident, the Gauteng education department suspended the hairstyle clause and directed the school governing body to workshop and rewrite the policy with meaningful input from learners. Section 27 framed this intervention as an example of how appearance rules must align with constitutional protections for dignity, equality, and cultural expression.

Zulaikha Patel's actions inspired other protests in South Africa, at Lawson Brown High School in the Eastern Cape, and St. Michael's School for Girls in Bloemfontein where parents marched as well. People worldwide began sharing pictures of their own afros on social media in solidarity with the female students of Pretoria Girl's High School. International press coverage ensued. The protests showed that racial divisions persist, despite the 1991 end of apartheid.

Patel's defiance initiated more protests and change. Gauteng Education MEC, Panyaza Lesufi visited Pretoria Girls' High School to hear the Black students’ grievances, not only about the hair policy but also about racism in general at the school. For example, girls are not permitted to speak African languages on the school premises, only English or Afrikaans. Patrick Gaspard, US ambassador to South Africa, tweeted: "All societies have rules. And sometimes those rules are biased and need to be exposed and protested." An online petition had almost 25,000 signatures within a day. The Gauteng Department of Education suspended the hair policy.

In November 2024 the Gauteng Department of Education (GDE) published the results of an independent investigation into allegations of racism at Pretoria High School for Girls, conducted by the law firm Mdladlamba Attorneys. The department said the inquiry was commissioned after fresh allegations and a resurfacing of earlier complaints about a “culture of racism” at the school. The report included findings of institutional failures and documented patterns of discriminatory treatment and recommended remedial actions intended to strengthen compliance with provincial and national education policy. The department further stated that the investigation sought to address concerns that had persisted since the 2016 protest and to evaluate whether earlier reforms had been properly implemented. Public organizations, including the Institute of Race Relations, urged the GDE to release the full investigatory report to promote transparency and public confidence, while the department published a summary and a ministerial statement outlining steps for monitoring and corrective support. The release of only a partial summary generated debate among education stakeholders, who argued over the balance between institutional accountability and the protection of minors’ identities.

The Pretoria Girls High incident has continued to come up in conversations about discrimination based on hair in South African schools. Many education groups and civil society organizations point to laws like the Promotion of Equality and Prevention of Unfair Discrimination Act (PEPUDA) and the constitutional right to equality when explaining how school appearance rules can indirectly discriminate against certain students. Commentators have noted that the case exposed gaps in how schools understand cultural rights and how they enforce discipline. International organizations have also referenced the incident when talking about children’s rights, especially issues related to cultural expression and dignity. Education International and several local advocacy groups still cite the case as a key example when calling for clear national rules to prevent discriminatory hair or grooming policies. Groups such as Equal Education have argued that the controversy shows why teachers need anti-bias training and why provinces should have stronger oversight of school policies.

Over the next few years, Patel widened her work to challenge how the beauty industry and major brands often reinforce anti-Black standards.

== Recognition ==
Patel was recognized as the youngest on the BBC News 100 Women List in 2016. She also received many other awards, such as the Avance Media 100 Most Influential Youth in South Africa in 2017, the Breaking Down Borders Inaugural Leadership Award in 2018, and the New African 100 Most Influential Africans in 2019.

In 2017, American muralist Lexi Bella painted a mural in honor of Zulaikha Patel in New York after being inspired by her activism in South Africa. The mural is of the same viral image of Patel during the demonstration with her natural hair and a fist raised to the sky as a sign of liberation.

In 2022, Patel was honored by the Young Activists Summit at the United Nations in Geneva, named one of just six laureates worldwide for that year, recognizing her ongoing dedication to social justice, equality, and youth empowerment.

In late 2024, Zulaikha Patel was selected as the first South African to join the Kofi Annan Changemakers Initiative, a global leadership program for young change-makers, giving her an international platform to expand her advocacy work beyond South Africa. Through this program she proposed establishing Early Childhood Development library corners as part of her mission to improve access to education and literacy in under-resourced township and rural communities.

Public figures have also expressed their support and admiration for Zulaikha Patel, including Solange Knowles, who commended her on Twitter (now X) for her work in the movement.

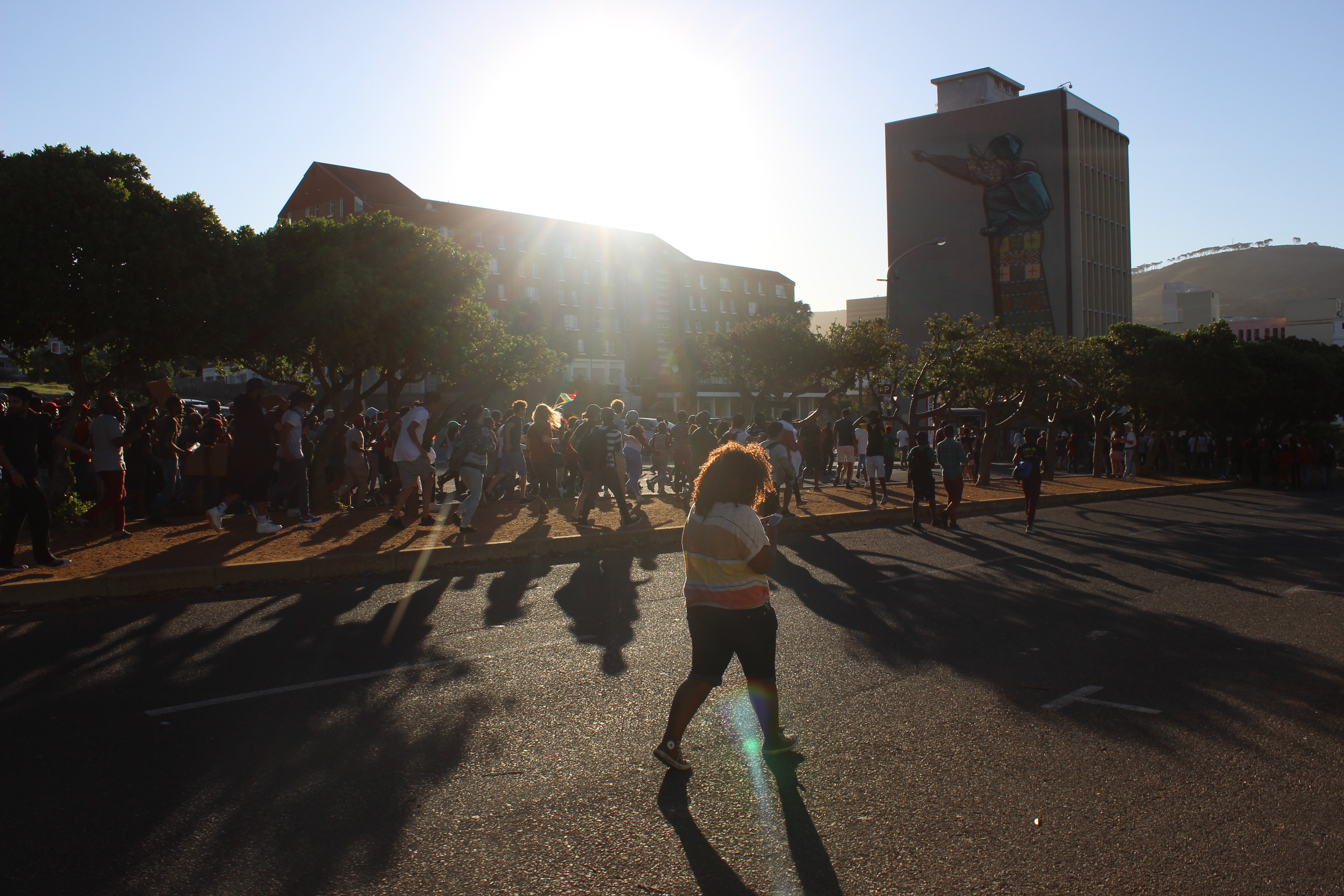
South African student-led protest

== Books ==
- Patel, Zulaikha (July 2021). My Coily Crowny Hair. Lingua Franca. ISBN 978-1928535904.
- Patel, Zulaikha (3 March 2025). Brave Like Me!. Pan Macmillan South africa. ISBN 978-1-77999-087-7.
