= Ellaphie Ward-Hilhorst =

South African botanical artist (1920–1994)

Johanna Ellaphie Ward-Hilhorst
- Born: 10 July 1920; Pretoria, South Africa
- Died: 30 June 1994 (aged 73); Cape Town, South Africa
- Education: Pretoria Girls' High School
- Occupation: Botanical Artist
- Awards: Cythna Letty Medal, Royal Horticultural Society Gold Medal

Pelargonium punctatum Willd. by Ellaphie Ward-Hilhorst

Johanna Ellaphie Ward-Hilhorst (10 July 1920 Pretoria – 30 June 1994 Cape Town) was a South African botanical artist.

She received her early education in Pretoria. After matriculating from Pretoria Girls' High School she started work in 1939 as a cartographer in the Survey Department of the Witwatersrand Gold Mines. At the end of World War II, she moved to the Netherlands to study watercolour painting under the eye of her uncle Gerhardus Hilhorst, a distinguished natural history artist.

Returning to South Africa, she worked in the advertising world as a freelance commercial artist in Cape Town and Johannesburg until her retirement in 1970 when she finally had the time to indulge her talents as a botanical artist. Since she always had a love and fascination for the genus Pelargonium, she set about illustrating all the known species. This massive project resulted in the publication of three volumes in 1977, 1981 and 1988. The entire collection of the original 314 water-colours and 160 habit sketches in pencil was acquired by the Brenthurst Library in Johannesburg in 1989. Completed plates of Pelargonium were found in her studio after her violent death.

She was a prolific worker, finishing over 800 botanical watercolour paintings in 24 years. Other genera on which she worked included Sarcocaulon, Haemanthus, Rhus, Plectranthus, Hessea, Strumaria, as well as Gasteria, Serruria and Diascia. She was in great demand by botanists to illustrate plants from their particular fields of interest. 42 of her paintings were published in Fiowering Plants of Africa and she also made frequent contributions to Bothalia, Aloe, SA Journal of Botany, National Cactus & Succulent Journal, Cactus & Succulent Journal (USA) and Veld & Flora.

Examples of her work are in the permanent collection of the Hunt Institute for Botanical Documentation, Pittsburgh, USA., the Shirley Sherwood Collection as well as many important private collections.

== Awards and honours ==
The Botanical Society of South Africa awarded her the Cythna Letty Medal in 1988: the South African Association of Botanists conferred the Certificate of Merit on her contribution to systematic botany and in 1990 she received a Gold Medal for the Haemanthus paintings at the Royal Horticultural Society Exhibition in London.

She is commemorated in Pelargonium ellaphieae E. M. Marais, Gasteria ellaphieae E.van Jaarsveld and Tylecodon ellaphieae Van Jaarsv.

== Publications ==
- 1984 A Revision of the genus Haemanthus - with Deirdre Snijman (Journal of South African Botany Suppl. vol. 12)
- 1988 Pelargoniums of Southern Africa (3 vols.) - with J. J. A. Van der Walt, P.J. Vorster (Juta) ISBN 0-86843-006-4
- 1994 Gasterias of South Africa - with Ernst J. van Jaarsveld (Fernwood Press) ISBN 1-874950-04-0
- 1995 Ericas of South Africa - with Dolf Schumann and Gerhard Kirsten (Fernwood Press) ISBN 0-9583154-3-4

== Links and sources ==
- Botanical Artists' Association of Southern Africa (BAASA)
- Hunt Institute for Botanical Documentation
