= Edith Aitken =

British headmistress

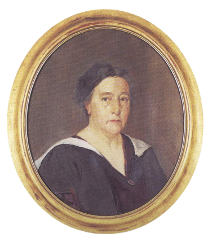
- Born: 16 June 1861; Bishophill, England
- Died: 2 November 1940 (aged 79); Wrecclesham, England
- Other names: "E.A."
- Education: Girton College
- Known for: Founding head of Pretoria High School for Girls
- Successor: Ms Jean Findlay McWilliam

Edith Aitken (16 June 1861 – 2 November 1940) was a British headmistress. She was the founding head at Pretoria High School for Girls.

== Life ==
Aitken was born in Bishophill, York in 1861. She was the daughter of Henry Martin Aitken, a surgical instrument manufacturer, and his wife, Elizabeth Atkinson. She had an elder sister and a younger brother Charles Aitken who would lead the Tate Gallery. Her father believed in educating his daughters. He died in 1875 but he requested that Edith should attend the North London Collegiate School (NLCS) where her elder sister, Rose, was already teaching. Rose had attended Girton College and in 1879 Edith left NLCS and followed her sister. She became a scientist and took the natural sciences tripos. She had a first class pass of Part 1 exams and would have taken a degree had she been male. As it was she had to obtain an M.A. from Dublin.

She practised at some important schools. Her first post was at Manchester High School for Girls which she left in 1883 to join Nottingham Girls' High School. She was at Notting Hill High School in 1886 where in 1891 she published an Elementary Textbook of Botany She returned to Frances Buss's North London Collegiate School as a science teacher and in 1899 she left to teach chemistry at Bedford College. Whilst she was there the South African War was in progress and it was complete by 1902.

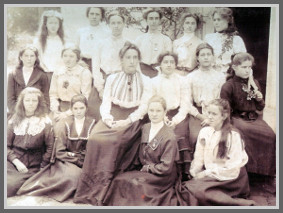
Ms. Edith Aitken with pupils in 1903

Aitken became the first headmistress of Pretoria High School for Girls. The war had ended and she was determined to bring together cultural groups. The school's motto came from NLCS but the School Charter was new. She modelled the school after Frances Buss's North London Collegiate School where she and her sister had taught. She also adopted the motto, "We work in hope" to apply to the new girls school. In the school's first magazine she wrote: "On the first re-opening nearly half the girls were of Dutch extraction. The school was opened and conducted with the earnest hope that here girls of different races and different denominations might meet in the commonwealth of letters which gave Erasmus and Shakespeare to the World; to acquire there, in accordance with the ideals of Christian Duty, the healthy physique, the trained mind and the disciplined character which should fit each to live worthily in that state of life unto which it should please God to call her."

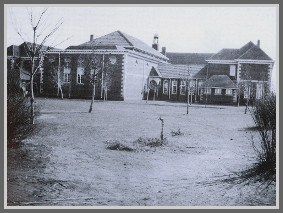
Back of school in 1923

Aitken employed Dutch speaking staff and she took lessons in Dutch. The school expanded and in 1915 the school was given new buildings and in 1917 playing fields. By 1923 when Aitken retired the school was acknowledged as the best in South Africa. Two years after she retired and she finally got the Cambridge degree that she had earned in the 19th century.

Aitken made her last visit to Pretoria in 1938. She died in Wrecclesham in 1940.
