= Myfanwy Bekker =

South African artist and art teacher

Myfanwy Bekker-Balajadia
- Citizenship: South African
- Education: Pretoria Technikon
- Occupations: Artist and art teacher
- Spouse: Kenji Balajadia

Myfanwy Bekker-Balajadia is a South African artist and art teacher. Her work is shown in galleries and showrooms throughout the world. She is collected by private and corporate entities, and continues to produce, both for private commissions and retail galleries. She was born into a large and eccentric South African family where they explored individual expression each evening. She attended Pretoria High School for Girls and Pretoria Technikon where she received a diploma in fine arts with a major in painting. At Pretoria Technikon, she had associations with Richard Adams, Walter Battis, Esias Bosch, Sammy Lieberman and Gunter van der Reis.

She began ceramic technology course after college, and taught ceramics. She also worked in P.A.C.T. the South African state theater as a painter. She was studio manager for Richard Adams School of Ceramics in South Africa and taught life drawing at the University of Pretoria at the Architectural School

She studied and was influenced by art through traveling. She has worked under Vladimir Tarachenhof in the Seychelles. She moved to the U.S in 1976 and has lived and taught in New Mexico, Texas and California. She has gained widespread recognition both in Africa and the United States. She continues to inspire and teach artists in South Africa. She has shown in galleries throughout the US and is represented in many corporate and private collections. Since 1993 Bekker has concentrated on commissions, designing spaces and charitable shows. she continues to solo, group exhibits and published work.

She is married to Kenji Balajadia.
