= Deanna Petherbridge =

South African artist, writer and curator (1939–2024)

Deanna Petherbridge CBE (11 February 1939 – 8 January 2024) was a South African and British artist, writer and curator. Petherbridge's practice was drawing-based (predominantly pen and ink drawings on paper), although she also produced large-scale murals and designed for the theatre. Her publications in the area of art and architecture were concerned with contemporary as well as historical matters, and in latter years she concentrated on writing about drawing. The Primacy of Drawing: Histories and Theories of Practice was published June 2010 and curated exhibitions included The Quick and the Dead: Artists and Anatomy, 1997, Witches and Wicked Bodies, 2013. She celebrated a retrospective exhibition of her drawings at Whitworth Art Gallery, University of Manchester (2 December 2016 – 4 June 2017) accompanied by the monograph Deanna Petherbridge: Drawing and Dialogue, Circa Press, 2016.

== Life and career ==
Petherbridge was born in Pretoria, South Africa on 11 February 1939. She attended Pretoria High School for Girls and obtained a degree in Fine Art at the University of the Witwatersrand. After a post-graduate year teaching in the department she emigrated to the UK in 1960. In 1967 she acquired a house on the island of Sikinos dividing her studio practice for many years between London and Greece and after 2003 between London and Italy with a studio in Umbria (2004–2015).

After early years as a painter, producing soft-sculpture and sometimes employing anti-war imagery, Petherbridge turned to monochromatic pen and ink drawing as her primary medium in the 1970s. Studies of Islamic art and architecture, vernacular building and historical fortifications made during early travels in Europe, the Maghreb and Middle East were the basis of early exhibitions of geometric drawings; later Hindu temple architecture, ruins and vernacular structures became an important source for drawings. Her work continues to employ architectonic metaphors and in recent years she has become increasingly interested in reflections on place and landscape.

The Destruction of the City of Homs Tate.

Symbolic representations of war were the subject of the 1980s around the time of the Falkland conflict. These have again become the dominant theme for large multi-panelled drawings, such as The Destruction of the City of Homs, 2016 (Tate, London; on display in Walk Through British Art: 60 Years). In celebration of drawing as a portable, immediate and expeditious medium, Petherbridge has produced work in other venues than her studio while undertaking drawing residencies at Manchester City Art Gallery, UK(1982) Lalit Kala Akademi Studios Calcutta (British Council sponsored) (1986), Monash University, Melbourne, Australia (2003), Beaconhouse National University, Lahore, Pakistan (2005) and the National Art School, Sydney (2011).

Petherbridge's teaching career included sessional lectureships at the Architectural Association, London (1981–85), the Fine Art departments of the University of Reading and Middlesex Polytechnic (1984–1987). She was appointed Professor of Drawing at the Royal College of Art (1995 -2001) where she launched the Centre for Drawing Research, the first doctoral programme in drawing in the UK. She was Arnolfini Professor of Drawing at the University of the West of England, Bristol (2002–2006) (appointed Emeritus Professor of Drawing in 2006) and Professor of Drawing at the University of Lincoln (2007–2009). She has supervised a number of PhD students and has delivered lectures, conference and symposium papers internationally. Extended lecture series in the UK include: Contemporary Drawing: Exploring the Unknown, Tate Millbank (January–March 1997), the BBC Radio Three broadcast series The Outline Around the Shadow (10–14 February 1997) and Drawing towards Enquiry at the National Gallery London (February–March 2006) in association with Camberwell College of Arts. She has undertaken extensive lecture tours in other countries, some under the auspices of the British Council for example in India (1985-6 and 1987-8) and South East Asia (1994–95). There have also been lecture tours in Australia (1995, 2003, 2011, 2015), Pakistan (2005), USA (2010), Puerto Rico (2013).

Her public commissions include designing sets and costumes for The Royal Ballet in collaboration with choreographer Ashley Page A Broken Set of Rules (1984) and Bloodlines (1990); and One by Nine (1987), choreographer Jennifer Jackson, Sadler's Wells Royal Ballet. She was commissioned by the Artistic Records Committee of the Imperial War Museum, London (1989). She also undertook a mural on four flours for the curved foyer wall of the Symphony Hall, International Conference Centre, Birmingham (1991).

In 1991 Petherbridge curated the trans-historical touring exhibition The Primacy of drawing: An Artist's View for National Touring, The South Bank Centre and co-selected the collaborative exhibition, Materia Medica: A New Cabinet of Medicine and Art, The Wellcome Institute, London (1995–96). This was followed by The Quick and the Dead: Artists and Anatomy, (1997) National Touring for the Arts Council of England. This exhibition moved to an extended showing renamed Corps à vif. Art et anatomie, (1998) at the Musée d'Art et d'Histoire, Geneva, co-curated with Claude Ritschard and Andrea Carlino. Witches and Wicked Bodies at the Scottish National Gallery of Modern Art, Edinburgh, (2013) was re-curated for the Prints and Drawings Gallery at the British Museum (2014–2015) and Artists at Work, was co-curated with Anita Viola Sganzerla, The Courtauld Drawings Gallery, London (2018). Petherbridge has also curated a number of exhibitions of contemporary drawers including Drawing as Vital Practice, Pitzhanger Manor Gallery & House, London (2007) and Narratives of Arrival and Resolution: Abstract Works on Paper, Michael Richardson Contemporary Art, London (2013).

Petherbridge began contributing reviews and articles to Architectural Review in 1979 and has written extensively for specialist journals and the daily press including Architects' Journal, Crafts Magazine, Building Design and the Financial Times in the 1980s, when she ran a regular column in Art Monthly commenting on commissioning, sponsorship and the social structures of visual art communities in the United Kingdom. She has written many catalogue essays and chapters in books and in recent years has published in academic journals on a wide range of contemporary and historical issues in art and architecture, with a particular focus on drawing. She was a Research Scholar at the Getty Research Institute, Los Angeles (2001– 2002). She also held a research fellowship at the Yale Center for British Art, New Haven (2007).

In 1996 she was appointed a Commander of the Order of the British Empire (CBE) for services to drawing and teaching. She was awarded a Fellowship of the Royal College of Art (FRCA) 1997, an Honorary Fellowship of the Royal Institute of British Architects (Hon. FRIBA)1998 and Honorary Doctorate in Design (Hon DDes) Kingston University, London, 2001. In 2019 she was appointed an Honorary Fellow of the Warburg Institute, London.

Deanna Petherbridge died at her London home on 8 January 2024, at the age of 84.

== Selected publications ==
- "Passionate and Dispassionate Patronage", "Four Commissions in Context" & "Exaggerations of a Public Order" in Peter Townsend (ed.), Art within Reach, London: Thames & Hudson, 1984. ISBN 9780500973158
- Nineteen Eighty-Four: An exhibition, London: Camden Arts Centre, 1984. ISBN 9780950553221
- Art for Architecture: A Handbook on Commissioning, Deanna Petherbridge (ed.), Norwich & London: HM Stationery Office, 1987. ISBN 978-0-11-751794-3
- The Primacy of Drawing: An Artist's View, London: South Bank Centre, 1991. ISBN 9781853320781
- The Quick and the Dead: Artists and Anatomy, Deanna Petherbridge & Ludmilla Jordanova, London: The Southbank Centre and Berkeley: University of California Press, 1997. ISBN 9780520217386
- Corps à vif, Deanna Petherbridge, Claude Ritschard, Andrea Carlino, Geneva: Musée d’art et d’histoire, 1998. ISBN 9782830601589
- "Constructing the Language of Line", in John Flaxman 1755 – 1826: Master of the Purest Line, David Bindman (ed.), London: Sir John Soane Museum & Strang Collection, University College, 2003. ISBN 9780954228422
- "In Touch and Out of Mind: The Psychodynamics of Obsessive Drawing" in Creativity, Madness and Civilisation, Richard Pine (ed.), Cambridge: Cambridge Scholars Press, 2007. ISBN 9781847180919
- "Nailing the Liminal: The Difficulties of Defining Drawing" in Writing on Drawing: Essays on Drawing Practice and Research, S.W. Garner (ed.), Bristol: Intellect Books, 2008. ISBN 9781841502007
- Primacy of Drawing: Histories and Theories of Practice, New Haven and London: Yale University Press, 2010. ISBN 9780300126464
- Witches & Wicked Bodies, Edinburgh: National Galleries of Scotland in association with the British Museum, 2013. ISBN 9781906270551
- Deanna Petherbridge Drawing and Dialogue, Essays by Martin Clayton, Roger Malbert, Gill Perry, Angela Weight, London: Circa Publications, 2016. ISBN 9780993072154
- Artists at Work, Deanna Petherbridge & Anita Viola Sganzerla, eds. Ketty Gottardo and Rachel Sloan. London: The Courtauld Gallery, 2018. ISBN 9781911300441

== Selected exhibitions ==
- 'The Iron Siege of Pavia' Graphic Mural and Other Drawings, Whitechapel Art Gallery, London, 1975
- Deanna Petherbridge, Gallery K, Washington DC, 1977
- Hayward Annual '78, Hayward Gallery, London, 1978.
- India: Tombs and Temples, Angela Flowers Gallery, London, 1980
- Art and the Sea, Third Eye Centre, Glasgow, and five venue UK tour, 1981–82
- Deanna Petherbridge Drawings 1968–1982, Manchester City Art Gallery and Warwick Arts Trust, 1982–1983
- Nineteen Eighty-Four An Exhibition, Arkwright Arts Trust, Camden Arts Centre, London, 1984
- Images et imaginaires d'architecture: dessin, peinture, photographie, arts graphiques, théatre, cinema en Europe aux XlXe et XXe siècles, Centre Georges Pompidou, Paris, 1984
- Geometry of Rage Arnolfini, Bristol and Third Eye Centre, Glasgow, 1984.
- Artists Against Apartheid, Royal Festival Hall, London, 1985
- Deanna Petherbridge: Temples and Tenements: Images of India, Fischer Fine Art, London and Museum & Art Gallery, Preston, 1987.
- Temples & Tenements, British Council touring exhibition, six venues in India, 1987–88
- Themata: New Drawings by Deanna Petherbridge, Fischer Fine Art, London and Rochdale Art Gallery 1990.
- Deanna Petherbridge Drawings (in association with The Primacy of Drawing: An Artist's View) three venue tour UK, 1991–1992
- Drawing Allusions, British Council touring exhibition, four venues in South East Asia, 1994–95
- Inside Bankside, South London Gallery in association with the Tate Gallery, London, 1996
- Mirror Mirror: Self-portraits by Women Artists, National Portrait Gallery, London & tour, 2002
- Framing LA: A View from the Acropolis, Getty Research Institute, Los Angeles, January 2002
- Two Cities: Two Modernities, Drawings by Deanna Petherbridge, Faculty of Art & Design, Monash University, Melbourne, 2003
- Petherbridge Alone with Soane, Pitzhanger Manor Gallery and House, Ealing, London 2007.
- Deanna Petherbridge Drawings, Whitworth Art Gallery, University of Manchester, Manchester, 2016–2017.
- Deanna Petherbridge Places of Change and Destruction, Art Space Gallery, London, 2017
- Deanna Petherbridge Drawing and the Domain of Politics, Art Space Gallery, London, 2022
