= Werner Bronkhorst =

Australian artist (born 2001)

- Born: 18 June 2001 (age 25); Pretoria, South Africa
- Known for: Abstract expressionism
- Website: wernerbronkhorst.com

Werner Bronkhorst (born 18 June 2001) is an Australian-South African artist. He is best known for his sculptural paintings with hyperrealistic miniature figures.

== Early life ==
Bronkhorst was born in Pretoria, South Africa, on 18 June 2001. He grew up in a "family of athletes", training as a runner while painting in his youth. He matriculated from Pretoria Boys High School before taking a gap year in Sydney, Australia, eventually choosing to move to the city at 18 and work as a furniture designer before beginning a professional art career in 2022.

== Career ==
Bronkhorst is best known for his depictions of hyperrealistic miniature figures and scenes, and charcoal drawings of cars overlaid with bold text. He has built a large following on social media, where he showcases his artwork.

In 2024, he collaborated with car brand Porsche to create a custom charcoal sketch of a Porsche 911, which was featured at the 2024 Australian Grand Prix. He also collaborated with luxury watchmaker TAG Heuer in 2025 to create three sculptures of racecars, referencing the 2025 Australian Grand Prix.

In August 2025, Bronkhorst unveiled three original pieces inspired by aquatic sports to raise money for the World Aquatics Foundation. The headline piece, Fish In Water, depicted eight Olympic swimmers (Note: Kaylee McKeown, Qin Haiyang, Katie Ledecky, Léon Marchand, Summer McIntosh, Kyle Chalmers, Gretchen Walsh, and Thomas Ceccon.) in a competition pool, and sold at auction for $372,000 USD.

Bronkhorst collaborated with golfing brand Malbon in September 2025 to release a series of original works and prints featuring hyperrealistic depictions of golfers to mark the beginning of the 2025 Ryder Cup. In November of the same year, he collaborated with Formula One driver Lando Norris to create a hand-painted 3D helmet celebrating Norris' 150th Grand Prix entry. The two also collaborated on a pop-up store and gallery in Las Vegas, Nevada to showcase and sell limited edition prints and merchandise.

== Personal life ==
Bronkhorst lives in Sydney, Australia with his partner, Charli, and their two children.
