= Simondium =

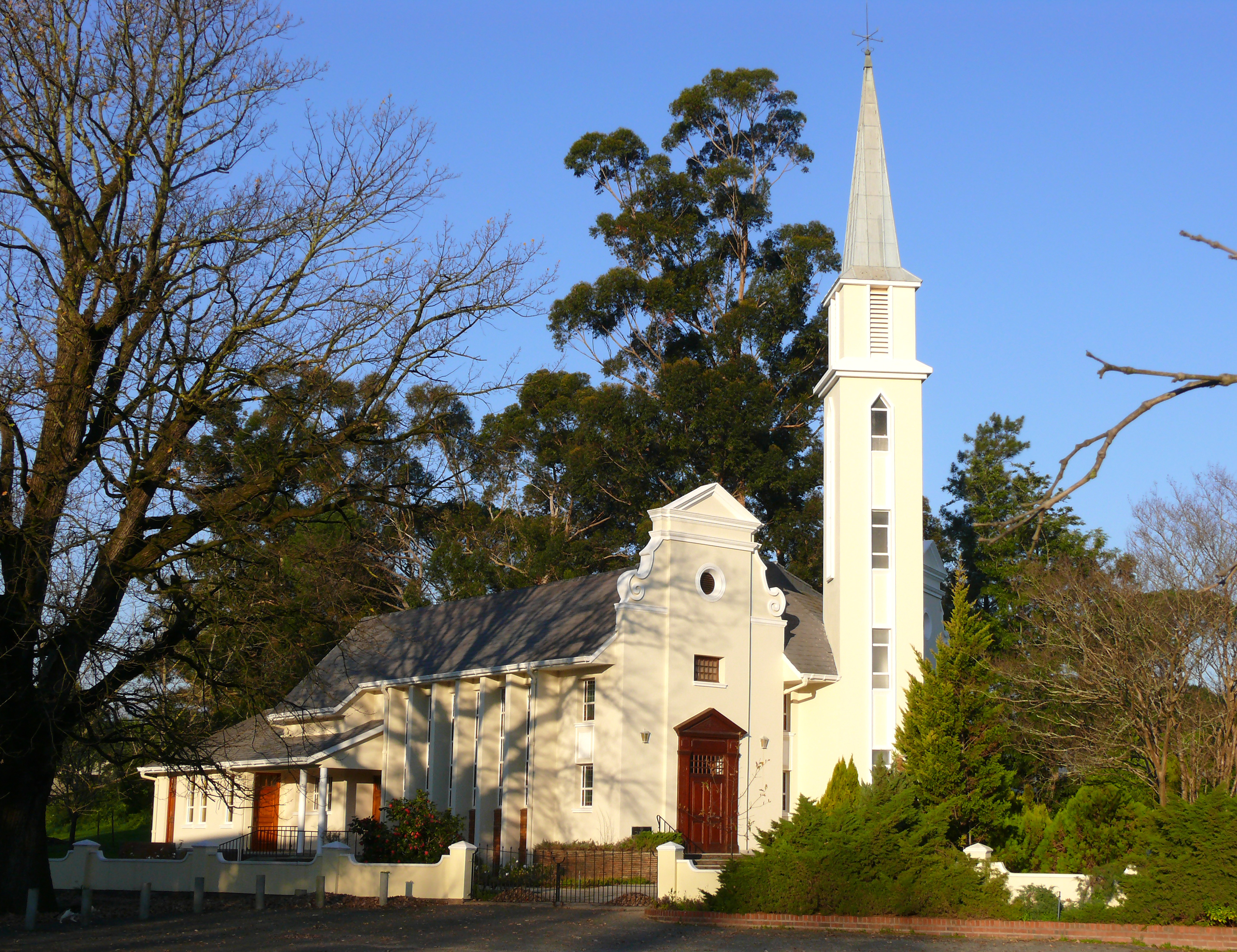
- Church in Simondium

- Location within Western Cape Location within South Africa
- Coordinates: 33.851°S 18.966°E
- Country: South Africa
- Province: Western Cape
- District: Cape Winelands
- Municipality: Drakenstein

Government
  - Type: ward 1
  - Councillor: Calvin Croutz (DA)
- Time zone: UTC+2 (SAST)
- Postal code (street): 7670
- PO box: 7670

Simondium is a hamlet 8 kilometres (5.0 mi) south of Paarl in western South Africa. It was named after Pierre Simond (1651–1713), Huguenot minister at the Cape.
