= Veldskoen Shoes =

South African footwear company

Veldskoen Shoes is a South African shoe brand and company headquartered in Cape Town.

== History ==
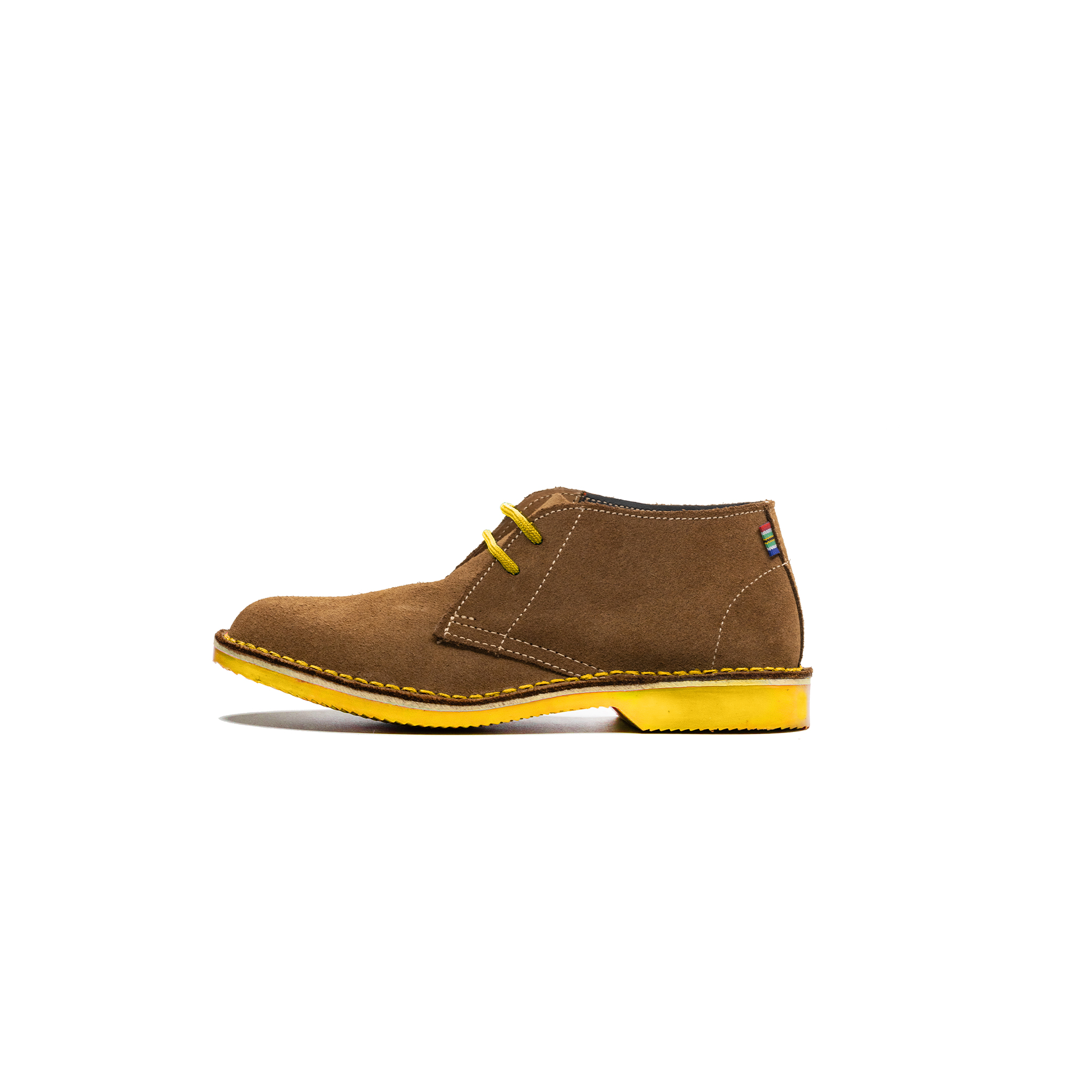
A modern Veldskoen Shoe

Veldskoen Shoes was founded in 2016 by friends Nick Dreyer and Ross Zondagh. After watching the opening ceremony of the 2016 Summer Olympics in Rio de Janeiro, Brazil, it is believed that the pair held the viewpoint that the South African athletes had an opportunity to express their national heritage more profoundly through their attire at the opening ceremony. The two started envisioning the kind of outfits that could have more aptly embodied the essence of South Africa. While discussing options, Ross Zondagh proposed the idea of incorporating a pair of leather Veldskoen, citing their iconic status as South African shoes. However, Dreyer expressed skepticism, noting that Veldskoen was no longer considered fashionable. Their conversation delved into strategies for enhancing the shoe's appeal, infusing it with a sense of fashion-forwardness, and fostering a sense of unity among South Africans. The end product was in the form of brightly colored soles and laces representing South Africa's flag and rainbow nation; which is Veldskoen Shoes' trademark look.

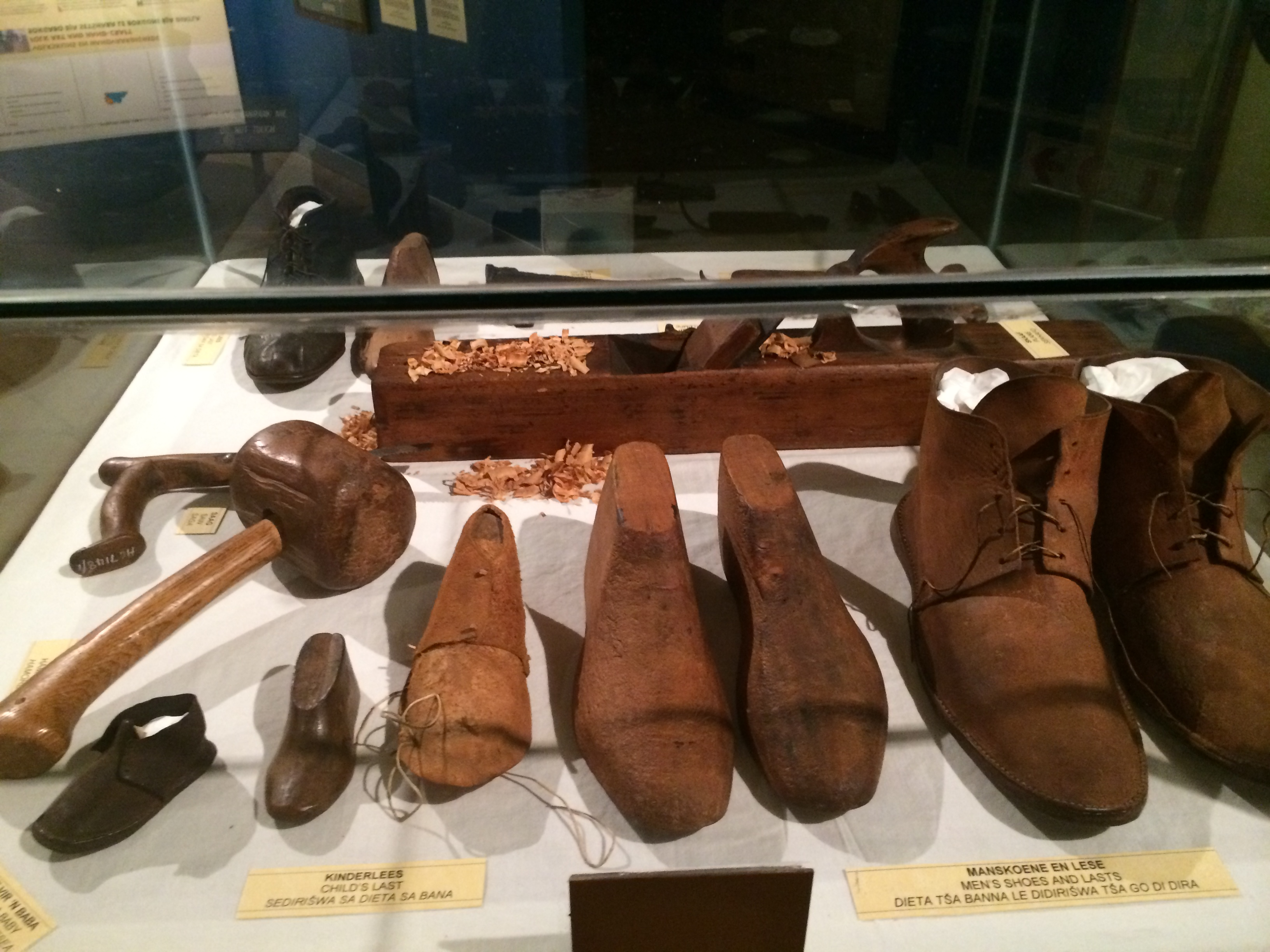
Veldskoene

The company chose the name 'Veldskoen' to honor a distinct style of shoe deeply rooted in South African tradition. In English, the name translates to 'field shoe,' reflecting its practical design and outdoor heritage. Their design is based on the traditional Khoisan footwear.

== Overseas markets ==
Veldskoen Shoes exports products to 32 countries. This includes the US, Australia, New Zealand, Taiwan, China, the Nordic countries, Canada, the entire Europe, and parts of Africa.

All Veldskoen Shoes raw materials are sourced locally, from South African businesses. From the leather to the thread and the thermoplastic rubber (TPR) components. Indirectly Veldskoen Shoes supports close to 100 people across the different factories and tanneries in South Africa. In 2019, businessman Mark Cuban and celebrity Ashton Kutcher acquired a 50% ownership stake in Veldskoen Shoes US business. In 2019, Veldskoen Shoes made waves in British media after Prince Harry, who was touring South Africa with his wife, Meghan Markle, wore the brand.

In 2021, Veldskoen was named the official off-field shoe of South African athletes at the Olympic Games in Tokyo by the South African Sports Confederation and Olympic Committee (SASCOC). In 2020, Veldskoen Shoes collaborated with DHL to launch a limited edition sneaker in London called "Dear Everyone". Minnie Dlamini wore the sneaker at the Paris Fashion Week.

In June 2023, Valor Hospitality Partners and Veldskoen Shoes launched a strategic initiative to provide vellies to their Hotel Staff across the United States. In 2023, Veldskoen Shoes collaborated with Briana Evigan, American actress and dancer best known for her appearance in the Step Up (franchise), to create a Ranger "MoveMe" boot.

In July 2026, the Veldskoen commemorative plaque was unveiled in Century City in Cape Town as part of the Long March to Freedom exhibition. The exhibition celebrated the iconic South African shoe's contribution to the country's cultural heritage, craftsmanship, and entrepreneurship.

== Awards ==
2021 Veldskoen Shoes (Pty) Ltd was the winner in the small enterprises category at the South African AGOA Exporter of the Year Awards.
