= Stanford Lake College =

Coordinates: 23°54′39″S 29°58′20″E

- Haenertsburg, Limpopo Province, South Africa

Information
- Type: Independent Day/Boarding Co-Ed
- Founded: 1998
- Headmaster: Alan Redfern
- Grades: 8–12
- Enrollment: 272 (max)
- Colours: Green, navy and white

Stanford Lake College is an independent, co-educational, day and boarding high school located in the Magoebaskloof area of the Limpopo Province of South Africa. The college is situated at the edge of Troutbeck Lake and Stanford Lake, and across from the Ebenezer Dam in the mountains of the Wolkberg, part of the northern Drakensberg range. The slopes are covered with indigenous forest as well as large tracts of pine forests, the most important feature of the Magoebaskloof.

Stanford Lake College is a full member of the Independent Schools Association of Southern Africa (ISASA) and of the International Round Square Organisation.

== Environment ==
Stanford Lake College is located on the edge of two lakes and is surrounded by forest. The college facilities include an adventure centre, "The Dream and Do Centre" and a 15 m tall climbing tower. Kayaking and canoeing take place on the water next to the centre.

== Academic Programme ==
The college writes the IEB examinations but has added to the traditional academic programme seen in most schools in South Africa. Instead it includes the "dad" (dream an' do) programme along with traditional classes during grades 8 and 9. The dad programme focuses on developing self-confidence along with skills needed in the modern world including problem solving, communication skills and risk taking opportunities
