= Transvaal Education Department =

Transvaal Education Department was an official body of the Transvaal Colony which was founded in 1901 to provide an education which would help anglicize the Boers following the dissolution of the South African Republic. Edmund Beale Sargant was appointed Director of the department and provided advice to the military authorities.
