= Roy McComish =

Scottish educator, headmaster, artist and army officer (1922-1995)

- Roy McComish at Box Hill
- Born: 28 February 1922; Glasgow, Scotland, United Kingdom
- Died: 15 June 1995 (aged 73); England, United Kingdom
- Education: Glasgow School of Art
- Occupations: Headmaster, artist
- Employers: Gordonstoun School, Box Hill School
- Known for: Founder and first headmaster of Box Hill School
- Spouse: Barbara Delano Laing
- Children: 2
- Military career
- Branch: British Army
- Rank: Captain
- Unit: Seaforth Highlanders
- Conflicts: Second World War

John MacLachlan Roy McComish (28 February 1922 – 15 June 1995) was a Scottish educator, headmaster, artist and British Army officer who founded the independent boarding school Box Hill and served as its first headmaster. Prior to founding Box Hill, McComish was a housemaster and art master at Gordonstoun, an independent school in Scotland, and he included some of that school's educational ideas in the formation of his own school. As headmaster of Box Hill, McComish was one of the founding headmasters and leading organisers (along with Jocelin Winthrop Young) of the Round Square, an international network of schools, based on the educational concepts of Kurt Hahn founder and headmaster of Gordonstoun. Utilising his skills as an artist McComish designed the associations logo.

== Time at Gordonstoun ==
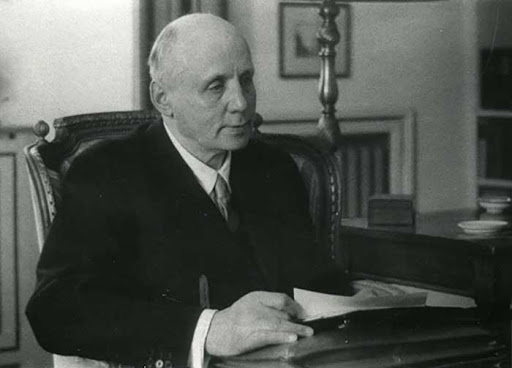
Kurt Hahn

After service as an officer with the Seaforth Highlanders during the Second World War and completing his time at university, McComish was appointed as Art Master and Housemaster at Gordonstoun in 1949 by innovative German educator Kurt Hahn who was then the school's headmaster. McComish also acted as master in charge of the school's cadet force. It was at Gordonstoun that McComish first became acquainted with Jocelin Winthrop Young (son of Geoffrey Winthrop Young) and the two men began a long lasting friendship and working relationship, Winthrop Young had returned to visit Gordonstoun and his mentor Kurt Hahn having previously been a pupil at Gordonstoun.

In 1953 an earthquake struck Greece, a disaster which caused the death of thousands of people and the destruction of many buildings. Shortly after the earthquake King Paul of Greece visited the site of the earthquake with his wife Frederica of Hanover and her brother Prince George of Hanover who was at this point the headmaster of Schule Schloss Salem. Prince George decided to initiate a building project to help repair the damage done to the island of Cephalonia his project would involve students from schools in various different countries. One of these schools was Gordonstoun and these students were under the supervision of Roy McComish. A group of 120 students from 8 countries (including those from Gordonstoun) headed to Greece in July 1954 and were joined there by a group from Anavryta organised by Winthrop Young. The combined group then headed to Argostoli on the island of Cephalonia. Once there they set to work building a home for a number of elderly people who had been left homeless. The success of this co-operation between several like-minded schools acted as the inspiration for the Round Square.

== Foundation of Box Hill School and the Round Square ==
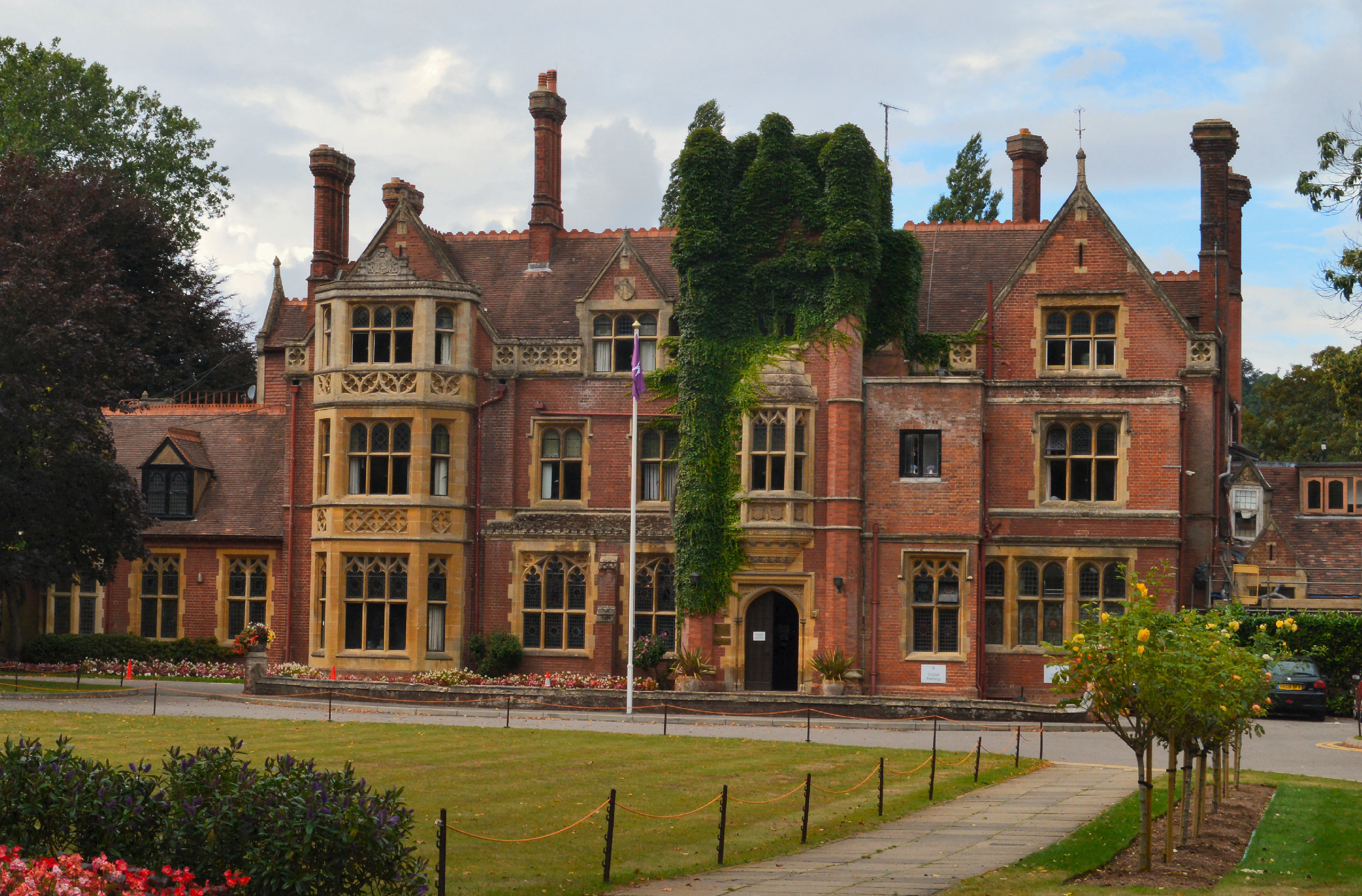
Dalewood House, main building of Box Hill School

In 1959 McComish discovered a small school that was for sale in Mickleham, Surrey. Deciding to leave Gordonstoun and set up his own school, he contacted a number of friends and between them they bought the Dalewood House Estate for £6,000 and established Box Hill School. McComish became the school's first headmaster and Jocelin Winthrop-Young became one of the school's first governors.

Between 1962 and 1963 McComish and Winthrop Young listed all the schools which they considered to have adopted Hahn's ideas or had included them at their foundation, these were: in Scotland, Rannoch School and Dunrobin School, in England, Abbotsholme School, Battisborough and Milton Abbey, in Germany Louisenlund, in Switzerland Aiglon College, in Africa Achimota School, in India The Doon School and the soon to open Athenian School in California. Gordonstoun, Salem, Anavryta and Box Hill were 'taken for granted' as the already established and pre-eminent Hahnian schools. Gordonstoun, Salem, Anavryta and Box Hill were 'taken for granted' as the already established and pre-eminent Hahnian schools.

On 5 June 1966, Kurt Hahn's 80th birthday was celebrated at Schule Schloss Salem, and Jocelin Winthrop Young who was now the headmaster of Salem invited Roy McComish as the headmaster of Box Hill School as well as the headmasters of Gordonstoun, Louisenlund, Anavryta, Battisborough, the Athenian School and the Atlantic college to discuss the establishment of a Hahn schools conference. This meeting was chaired by King Constantine and during its course an agreement was reached on naming the conference 'The Hahn Schools', it was then decided that the first conference would be held at Gordonstoun in 1967. At this first conference at Hahn's insistence the name 'The Hahn Schools' was dropped in favour of a new name 'The Round Square' after an iconic building at Gordounstoun. The six schools that attended this first conference and were the founding members of the Round Square were Box Hill School, Gordonstoun, Anavryta Experimental Lyceum, Schule Schloss Salem, Aiglon College and Abbotsholme School.

At the 2nd Round Square conference held at Box Hill the principles of the association were established and co-education was the first of the sequence of conference themes that was discussed. Box Hill became an important central location for the Round Square and conferences were often held there. At the 1980 Box Hill conference R.S.I.S. (Round Square International Service) was created to promote and organise overseas voluntary service projects in much the same way as the project in Cephalonia Roy McComish retired as headmaster of Box Hill School in 1987 and was replaced by Dr Rodney Atwood.

== Legacy ==
Founder of the Round Square Jocelin Winthrop Young noted the importance of Roy McComish and Box Hill School.

" Finally Roy McComish, without him Round Square would not have survived. To explain why, I must go back to a serious miscalculation in my original plan for the conference the administration and organisation were to be undertaken by different schools and thus infrastructure would fall away. But it just didn’t work out that way. Heads were too busy – and rightly so – dealing with their own schools. I was handicapped as I was unable to find a secretary who could write English and take dictation in that language. Therefore I had to do all my own correspondence, and this continued for 20 years until I finally became emancipated with a P.C. Throughout these years Box Hill was the centre of the association and Roy’s team of David Larg as treasurer, and Kay Holland as secretary to R.S.I.S. provided the administration. The McComish’s small drawing room became our headquarters and with Barbara McComish providing a bottomless tin of digestive biscuits and necessary relaxation by playing Bach to us on the piano, we got ahead. He pioneered all our main undertakings in India, Africa and the Middle East. He is an optimist and I a pessimist, if I may steal someone else’s definition: “One who has a pessimism of the intellect but always tries to hold on to an optimism of the will”. Roy designed our logo and his sketches of Hahn are unique. The most loyal of Hahn’s supporters, for years he used to propose at the conferences that the name revert to the original “Kurt Hahn” conference. However, he would not like me to treat him too seriously, so let us go back to that Box Hill co-education conference. At the final plenary Roy summed up in the presence of the delegates and Upper School and I quote: 'In Box Hill we have a good co-educational tradition and you will never see boys and girls walking in the school grounds hand in hand'. There was a joyous roar of laughter from all in Upper School; quite undismayed he added: 'Well, not when I’m there!' ".

Jocelin Winthrop Young OBE, founder of the Round Square on Roy McComish
