= Jocelin Winthrop Young =

British educator, headmaster (1919–2012)

Lieutenant Commander Jocelin Winthrop Young OBE
- Jocelin Winthrop Young at Anavryta in 1957
- Born: 25 October 1919; Heversham, Westmorland (now Cumbria), England
- Died: 8 February 2012 (aged 92); Heiligenberg, near Salem, Germany
- Education: Schule Schloss Salem, Gordonstoun School
- Occupation: Headmaster
- Employers: Anavryta Experimental Lyceum, Schule Schloss Salem
- Known for: Co-founder and first headmaster of Anavryta, founder of the Round Square, head of boarding and headmaster of Salem campus at Schule Schloss Salem, governor of Box Hill School, tutor of Constantine II of Greece
- Spouses: Countess Ghislaine de la Gardie (m. 1951; div. 1974) Countess Sibylle von der Schulenburg (m. 1974; died 1998)
- Children: 3
- Parents: Geoffrey Winthrop Young (father); Eleanor Winthrop Young (mother)
- Relatives: Sir George Young, 3rd Baronet (paternal grandfather); William Cecil Slingsby (maternal grandfather)
- Awards: Officer of the Order of the British Empire; Commander of the Order of Saints George and Constantine
- Military career
- Allegiance: United Kingdom
- Branch: Royal Navy
- Service years: 1939–1946
- Rank: Lieutenant Commander
- Conflicts: Second World War; Normandy landings

Jocelin Slingsby Winthrop Young OBE (25 October 1919 – 8 February 2012) was a British educator, headmaster and Royal Navy officer who co-founded the Greek independent boarding school Anavryta and founded the Round Square association of schools. He was also the private tutor of King Constantine II of Greece between 1948 and 1958.

== Early life ==
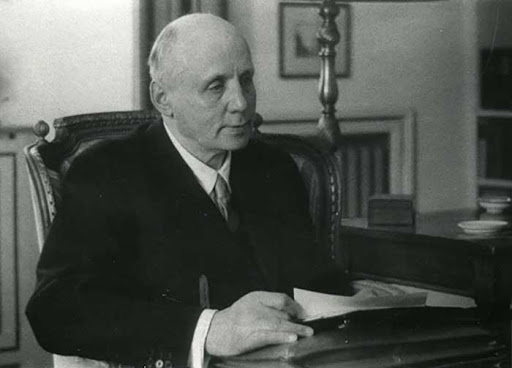
Kurt Hahn

Winthrop Young was born on 25 October 1919 at Heversham, Westmorland (now Cumbria) to renowned mountaineers Geoffrey Winthrop Young and Eleanor Winthrop Young. Winthrop Young's parents were friends with German educator Kurt Hahn and consequently he was sent to study at Hahn's first school Schule Schloss Salem from 1931 to 1933.

When Hahn (who was Jewish) sought to leave the country following the rise to power of the Nazis, Winthrop Young's parents were amongst those who facilitated his escape to Britain. Once in Britain, Hahn soon sought to establish a new school, and following a few short term arrangements he set up a school at Gordonstoun in Scotland. Winthrop Young was amongst the first cohort of pupils, along with Prince Philip (then of Greece and Denmark), who had also moved to Gordonstoun from Salem. The two men were amongst the crew who sailed the school's ocean-going vessel 'Henrietta' to Norway.

This experience triggered a lifelong love for sailing and the sea within Winthrop Young, and following the outbreak of war in 1939 he volunteered to serve in the Royal Navy.

== Tutor to Crown Prince of Greece, and establishment of Anavryta ==
After his period of service as an officer with the Royal Navy during the Second World War (where he reached the rank of Lieutenant Commander and took part in the Normandy landings), Winthrop Young decided against an education at university and instead began working at Imperial Chemical Industries in Birmingham. During this time King Paul of Greece and Queen Frederica contacted Kurt Hahn and expressed their desire that he set up a school in Greece so that their son the Crown Prince Constantine could be educated there.

Kurt Hahn suggested that Winthrop Young move to Greece, become private tutor to Crown Prince Constantine, and establish a new school there. Winthrop Young took Hahn up on his offer, and along with the King and Queen set up the Anavryta Experimental Lyceum in 1949. Winthrop Young became the school's first headmaster and personal tutor to the future King Constantine II, who was amongst the school's first pupils.

Winthrop Young returned to visit Gordonstoun and here he became acquainted with Roy McComish, the two men began a long lasting friendship and working relationship

In 1953 an earthquake struck Greece, a disaster which caused the death of thousands of people and the destruction of many buildings. Shortly after the earthquake King Paul of Greece visited the site of the earthquake with his wife Frederica of Hanover and her brother Prince George of Hanover, who was at this point the headmaster of Schule Schloss Salem. Prince George decided to initiate a building project to help repair the damage done to the island of Cephalonia his project would involve students from schools in various different countries. One of these schools was Gordonstoun and these students were under the supervision of Roy McComish, a close friend and collaborator of Winthrop Young's.

A group of 120 students from 8 countries (including those from Salem and Gordonstoun) headed to Greece in July 1954, where a group from Anavryta joined them. Once they arrived at their destination of Argostoli, on the island of Cephalonia, they set to work building a home for a number of elderly people who had been left homeless. The success of this co-operation between several like-minded schools acted as his inspiration for Round Square. In 1958 the Crown Prince finished his education, and in 1959 Winthrop Young stood down as headmaster of Anavryta and returned to England.

In 1960 Winthrop Young was made an Officer of the Order of the British Empire for his work at Anavryta.

== Foundation of the Round Square and later career ==
Between 1962 and 1963 Roy McComish (who had at this point founded Box Hill School, where Winthrop Young had become one of its governors) and Winthrop Young listed all the schools which they considered to have adopted Hahn's ideas or had included them at their foundation. These were: in Scotland, Rannoch School and Dunrobin School; in England, Abbotsholme School, Battisborough and Milton Abbey; in Germany Louisenlund; in Switzerland Aiglon College; in Africa Achimota School; in India The Doon School; and the soon to open Athenian School in California. Gordonstoun, Salem, Anavryta and Box Hill were 'taken for granted' as the already established and pre-eminent Hahnian schools.

In 1964 Winthrop Young became head of boarding at Schule Schloss Salem, the school where he had received his early education. On 5 June 1966, Kurt Hahn's 80th birthday was celebrated at Schule Schloss Salem, and Winthrop Young had the headmasters of Box Hill School, Gordonstoun, Louisenlund, Anavryta, Battisborough, the Athenian School and the Atlantic College invited, to discuss the establishment of a Hahn schools conference. This meeting was chaired by King Constantine and during its course an agreement was reached on naming the conference 'The Hahn Schools', it was then decided that the first conference would be held at Gordonstoun in 1967. At this first conference, at Hahn's insistence, the name 'The Hahn Schools' was dropped in favour of a new name 'Round Square Conference,' after an iconic building at Gordonstoun.

The six schools that attended this first conference and were the founding members of the Round Square were Box Hill School, Gordonstoun, Anavryta Experimental Lyceum, Schule Schloss Salem, Aiglon College and Abbotsholme School. At the second Round Square conference, held at Box Hill, the principles of the association were established and co-education was the first of the sequence of conference themes that was discussed. At a later conference held at Box Hill in 1980 the R.S.I.S. (Round Square International Service) was created to promote and organise overseas voluntary service projects in much the same way as the project in Cephalonia.

Winthrop Young retired as head of boarding and headmaster of the Salem campus at Schule Schloss Salemin 1974, but continued to run Round Square as Honorary Secretary and later as Director until he retired from that position in 1992.

Winthrop Young died in Heiligenberg, near Salem in Germany in 2012 at the age of 92.
