= RGS Surrey Hills =

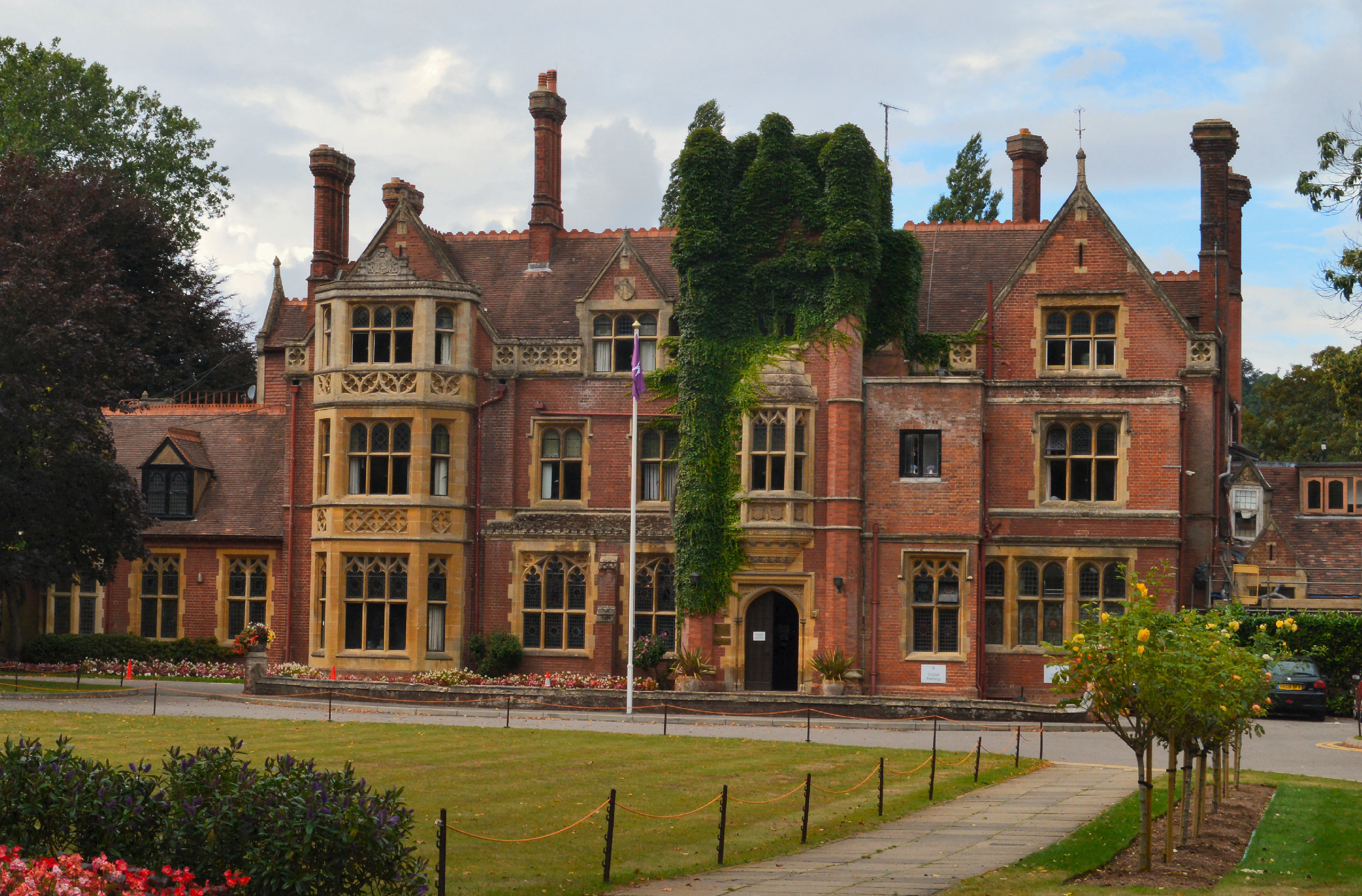
- Dalewood House, the main school building

Location
- Mickleham near Dorking, Surrey, RH5 6EA; England; 51.269°N 0.325°W

Information
- Type: Public School; Private day and boarding school
- Established: 1959 (replacing school founded in 1951)
- Founder: Roy McComish
- Local authority: Surrey
- Department for Education URN: 125388 Tables
- Chair: Trevor Johnson
- Headmistress: Hayley Robinson
- Gender: Co-educational
- Age: 11 to 18
- Enrolment: 398
- Colours: Green & Purple
- Affiliations: HMC; Round Square
- Thirds (Houses): Spartans; Olympians; Corinthians; Athenians
- Patrons: Queen Anne-Marie of Greece & until his death, Constantine II of Greece
- Architect: John Norton
- Website: rgs-surreyhills.org

RGS Surrey Hills is a coeducational independent day and boarding school for pupils aged 11 to 18 in Mickleham, near Dorking, Surrey, England. The school occupies a rural campus near Box Hill. In 2025, Box Hill School joined the Reigate Grammar School Group and was relaunched as RGS Surrey Hills. Fees for day pupils started at £27,162 per year (up to £30,534 in the sixth form), and full boarding fees at £45,204 per year (up to £55,131 in the sixth form). As Box Hill School the school was a founding member of the Round Square Conference of Schools (an association in which the school's founding headmaster, Roy McComish, played a vital role in the establishment and early administration of), as well as being a member of the Headmasters' and Headmistresses' Conference.

The school had offered the International Baccalaureate since September 2008 and re-introduced A levels in 2013, meaning both were available at Sixth Form. The school's patron is Queen Anne-Marie of Greece, who acted in this role alongside her husband Constantine II of Greece until his death in January 2023. Sir James Weatherall (the first commanding officer of the Royal Navy's flagship, the Ark Royal) served as warden of the school until his death in March 2018.

== History ==
=== History of Dalewood House before the school ===
Dalewood House, the main school building, was constructed in 1883 by a local developer called Charles J. Fox. The house was designed by the Victorian architect John Norton (who also designed a number of other buildings of distinction within the UK and Europe, including the National Trust house Tyntesfield in Somerset). Its design is both mock Tudor and Gothic Revival. The interior is full of hand-painted tiles, crafted stained-glass windows, and wood panelling, with fireplaces throughout. In 1890, the house was sold to David Evans (one of the nineteenth century’s preeminent silk printers and chairman of 'David Evans & Co'), on whose death it passed to his daughter Lucie Fosberie until 1939. Before Box Hill School took occupation of the house, it was in almost continuous private ownership by the Evans family but was converted a school building after the Second World War. The house was requisitioned by the Army as the headquarters of the Pay Corps during the Second World War. In 1951, the house was taken over and run as a school by two Australian sisters.

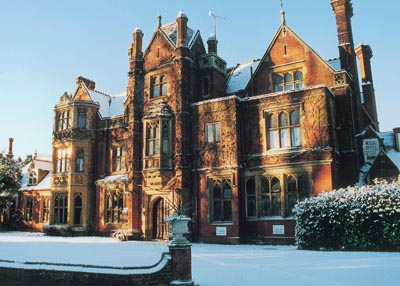
Dalewood House in winter

=== Foundation of the school ===
Box Hill School was founded in 1959 by Roy McComish a house master and art master at Gordonstoun. Having decided to leave Gordonstoun and set up his own school, he contacted a number of friends and between them they bought the Dalewood House Estate for £6,000. While at Gordonstoun McComish had taught under innovative German educator Kurt Hahn who had established Gordonstoun and been involved in or had inspired the creation of a number of other schools. Box Hill became the latest Hahnian school and McComish became the school's first headmaster whilst Jocelin Winthrop Young (another of Hahn's acolytes and creator of the Round Square movement) became one of the school's first governors.

=== Establishment of the Round Square and later history of the school ===
Between 1962 and 1963, McComish and Winthrop Young listed all the schools that they considered to have adopted Hahn's ideas or had included them in their foundation. These were: in Scotland, Rannoch School and Dunrobin School; in England, Abbotsholme School, Battisborough, and Milton Abbey; in Germany, Louisenlund; in Switzerland, Aiglon College; in Ghana, Achimota School; in India, The Doon School; and the soon-to-open Athenian School in California. Gordonstoun, Salem, Anavryta and Box Hill were 'taken for granted' as the already established and preeminent Hahnian schools.

On 5 June 1966, Kurt Hahn's 80th birthday was celebrated at Schule Schloss Salem, and the headmaster Prince Max of Baden invited Roy McComish as the headmaster of Box Hill School as well as the headmasters of Gordonstoun, Louisenlund, Anavryta, Battisborough, the Athenian School and the Atlantic college to discuss the establishment of a Hahn schools conference. This meeting was chaired by King Constantine and during its course an agreement was reached on naming the conference 'The Hahn Schools', it was then decided that the first conference would be held at Gordonstoun in 1967. At this first conference at Hahn's insistence the name 'The Hahn Schools' was dropped in favour of a new name 'The Round Square' after an iconic building at Gordounstoun. The six schools that attended this first conference and were the founding members of the Round Square were Box Hill, Gordonstoun, Anavryta Experimental Lyceum, Schule Schloss Salem, Aiglon College and Abbotsholme School.

At the 2nd Round Square conference held at Box Hill the principles of the association were established and co-education was the first of the sequence of conference themes that was discussed. Box Hill became a central location for the Round Square and conferences were held there. At the 1980 Box Hill conference R.S.I.S. (Round Square International Service) was created to promote and organise overseas voluntary service projects. Roy McComish retired as headmaster of Box Hill School in 1987 and was replaced by Dr Rodney Atwood after whom one of the school's boarding houses is named. He in turn served until 2003 before being replaced by Mark Eagers, who was replaced by Corydon Lowde in 2014.

== Thirds ==
Each student is assigned to a group or ″third″ for ″Inter Thirds″ competitions in music, sports and various other events, points are awarded for success in these competitions and the thirds compete against one another throughout the year. These are similar to houses in other boarding schools and are separate from the actual physical boarding houses that each boarding student is assigned to on arrival. Membership of a third is unlinked to a pupils year group or house. As the name suggests there were originally three thirds, however, the number of thirds has varied over the years at one point numbering as many as six. Currently there are four thirds which are as follows;

1. Spartans
2. Olympians
3. Corinthians
4. Athenians

== Organisation ==
RGS Surrey Hills educates boys and girls between the ages of 11 and 18 and offers both day education and boarding. The school is a member of the Headmasters' and Headmistresses' Conference and retains its association with Round Square.

The school provides education through the lower, middle and sixth-form years. Its sixth form offers both A-level and International Baccalaureate programmes.

As a founding member school of Round Square, RGS Surrey Hills encourages students to take part in community service activities. RGS Surrey Hills (as Box Hill School) received an overall rating of "Excellent" on the Independent Schools Inspectorate assessment in 2024, with academics rated "Good", and personal development rated "Excellent". In addition, the Independent Schools Inspectorate reported in May 2024 that the school had complied with recommendations from the 2014 Independent School Standards, and 2022 National Minimum Standards for Boarding.

== Boarding houses ==
RGS Surrey Hills has six boarding houses.

House	Gender	Details
Atwood	Mixed	Opened by Anne, Princess Royal, Atwood House was named after the school's second headmaster, Dr Rodney Atwood. It is a purpose-built two-storey house for the senior girl and boy boarders.
Burmester	Girls	A Grade II listed 18th-century house purchased by the school in 1979, used as a girls' boarding house for senior girls. Burmester has a large garden, which is used by the girls during the summer months for studying, socialising and relaxing.
Constantine	Boys	Opened in 1990 by the school's then Patron, King Constantine II of Greece, Constantine House was the first purpose-built boarding house at the school. It is a boys boarding and day house
Dalewood	Girls	Dalewood House is the school's main building and was purchased in 1959. Part of the listed building also forms Dalewood boarding house, providing boarding facilities for Years 7 to 11 junior girl boarders.
Old Cottage	Boys	Old Cottage is a Grade II listed house with parts dating back to the early 17th century. It was first used for borders in 1963. It is a senior boys' boarding house for boys from Years 12 and 13. It has a garden, which is a popular place to relax and study during the long summer days.
Ralph	Boys	Ralph House is a boys' boarding and day house. It has a garden in the quad area used for study, BBQs and relaxing during good weather.

== Headmasters and Headmistresses ==
1. Roy McComish (1959 – 1987)
2. Rodney Atwood (1987 – 2003)
3. Mark Eagers (2003 – 2014)
4. Corydon Lowde (2014 – 2023)
5. Hayley Robinson – (2023 – )

== Performing Arts ==
The school runs a Performing Arts programme, adding a new Music School in November 2009 which was opened by the Duke of Edinburgh.

== Campus ==
The school is situated on a countryside campus at Mickleham, near Dorking and Box Hill. Dalewood House is the principal historic building on the site.
