= David Hoare (disambiguation) =

David Hoare was an English cricketer.

David Hoare may also refer to:

- Sir David Hoare, 9th Baronet (born 1935), British banker
- David Hoare, former chairman of Ofsted
- David Hoare, co-founder of Infinite Monkeys
