= Round Square =

Network of schools

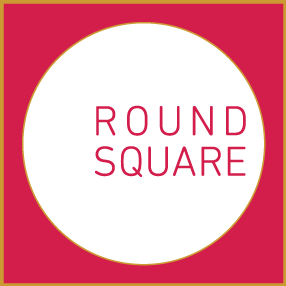
- Logo
- Founder: Kurt Hahn (educational concepts); Jocelin Winthrop Young (organisation)
- Type: Educational
- Members: New schools inducted by election of member schools
- Official language: English
- Website: www.roundsquare.org

Round Square is an international network of schools, based on the educational concepts of Kurt Hahn, and named after a distinctive building at Gordonstoun. Founded by a group of seven schools in the late 1960s, by 1996 it had grown to 20 member schools worldwide, and has since expanded to over 200 schools. Round Square is incorporated in England as a Company Limited by Guarantee, and is a registered charity.

== History ==
Between 1962 and 1963 Jocelin Winthrop Young and Roy McComish listed all the schools which they considered to have adopted the educational ideas of Kurt Hahn or had included them at their foundation. These schools were: in Scotland, Rannoch School and Dunrobin School; in England, Abbotsholme School, Battisborough and Milton Abbey; in Germany Louisenlund; in Switzerland Aiglon College, in Ghana Achimota School; in India The Doon School; Welham Girls' School, Dehradun and the soon to open Athenian School in California. Salem, Gordonstoun, Anavryta and Box Hill were 'taken for granted' as the already established and pre-eminent Hahnian schools.

On 5 June 1966, Kurt Hahn's 80th birthday was celebrated at Schule Schloss Salem, and as the headmaster of the school Winthrop Young invited the headmasters of Box Hill School, Gordonstoun, Louisenlund, Anavryta, Battisborough, the Athenian School, and the recently opened Atlantic College, to discuss the establishment of a Hahn schools conference. This meeting was chaired by King Constantine and during its course an agreement was reached on naming the conference "The Hahn Schools", it was then decided that the first conference would be held at Gordonstoun in 1967. At this first conference at Hahn's insistence the name "The Hahn Schools" was dropped in favour of a new name "The Round Square" after an iconic building at Gordounstoun. Six of the schools that attended this first conference and were the founding members of the Round Square: Box Hill School, Gordonstoun, Anavryta Experimental Lyceum, Schule Schloss Salem, Aiglon College and Abbotsholme School. At the second Round Square conference held at Box Hill, the principles of the association were established and co-education was the first of the sequence of conference themes that were discussed. At a later conference held at Box Hill in 1980, the Round Square International Service (RSIS) was created to promote and organise overseas voluntary service projects in much the same way as the project in Cephalonia. Winthrop Young retired as headmaster of Salem in 1974 but continued to run the Round Square association as Honorary Secretary and later as Director until he retired from that position in 1992.

== Activities ==
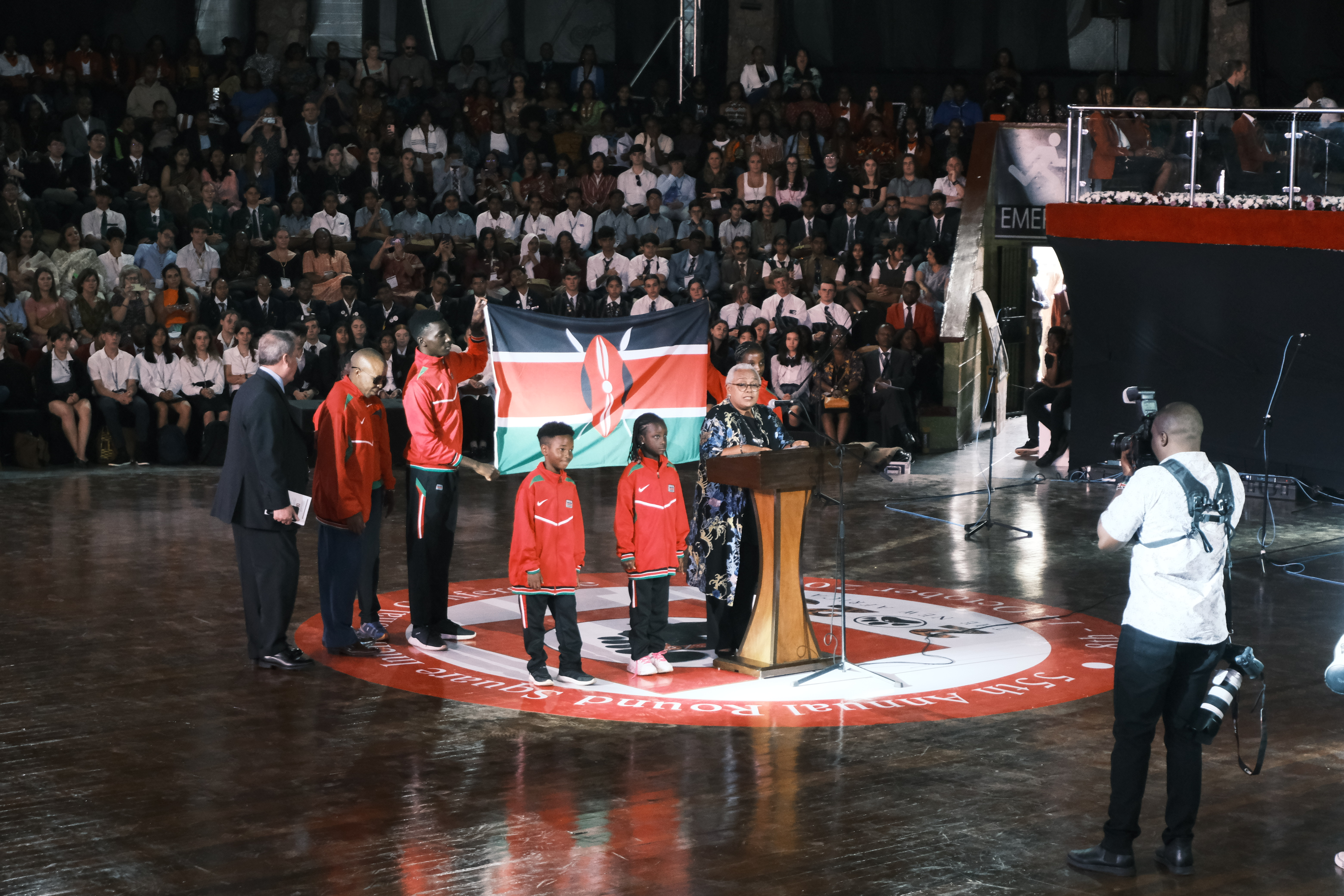
RSIC Kenya 2023 Opening Ceremony, opening speech featuring her right honorable Ngina Kenyatta

Round Square schools encourage students to take part in a range of community service activities both locally and internationally. Many projects are run through the school and further opportunities are available via the Round Square Region, Network and Worldwide Organisation. Notable events including the Round Square International Conference (RSIC), where as the most recent 2024 conference took place in Colombia, with five schools hosting. There were a total of 904 delegates – 662 students and 242 adults. The next conference is set to take place in September 2025 in Dubai. It will be organized by three schools (GEMS Modern Academy, The Millennium School, and The Indian High School, Dubai) and is expected to attract over 1,200 delegates.

== Round Square IDEALS ==
Round Square schools are characterised by a shared belief in an approach to education built around six themes, the IDEALS, drawn from the theories of the educationalist Kurt Hahn.

The Round Squared IDEALS
	Themes	Expectations
I	Internationalism	Discover and embrace similarities and differences between countries and cultures, promoting lasting transnational understanding and respect.
D	Democracy	Develop a personal compass for equality, fairness, justice, self-discipline, responsibility and a desire to do what is right for the greater good.
E	Environmentalism	Broaden horizons to understand mankind's place in the universe, the forces that shape our surroundings, and the impact we have.
A	Adventure	Push beyond perceived limits, cross boundaries, and discover that they are capable of more than they thought possible.
L	Leadership	Recognise that successful leaders are driven by a desire to be of service to others and to nurture, guide, develop and help them to improve and succeed.
S	Service	Ready and willing to volunteer and be involved where we are needed, applying and developing skills and understanding in support of individuals and communities both close to home and further afield.

== Member schools ==
Founder Members
School name	Country
Athenian School	United States
Abbotsholme School	United Kingdom
Aiglon College	Switzerland
Box Hill School (RGS Surrey Hills)	United Kingdom
Gordonstoun School	United Kingdom
Schule Schloss Salem	Germany

Other Members
School name	Country		
AKS Lytham	United Kingdom		
All Saints' College, Nainital	India		
Amman Baccalaureate School	Jordan		
Anania Shirakatsy Armenian National Lyceum	Armenia		
Appleby College	Canada		
Ashbury College	Canada		
Assam Valley School	India		
Aubrick Multicultural Bilingual School	Brazil		
Ballarat Grammar School	Australia		
Bangalore International School	India		
Bayview Glen School	Canada		
Barker College	Australia		
Beijing Concord College of Sino-Canada	China		
Belgrano Day School	Argentina		
Billanook College	Australia		
Birla Public School, Pilani	India		
Bishop Druitt College	Australia		
Bishop's College School	Canada		
Bridge House School	South Africa		
British Overseas School	Pakistan		
Brookhouse School	Kenya		
Buckingham Browne & Nichols	United States		
Bunbury Cathedral Grammar School	Australia		
Cadet College Hasanabdal	Pakistan		
Calgary French and International School	Canada		
Carrollwood Day School	United States		
Cate School	United States		
Cayman International School	Cayman Islands		
Chadwick International	South Korea		
Chadwick School	United States		
Chanderbala Modi Academy	India		
Cheongshim International Academy	South Korea		
Chittagong Grammar School	Bangladesh		
Chittagong Grammar School National Curriculum	Bangladesh		
Christ's College, Canterbury	New Zealand		
Cobham Hall School	United Kingdom		
Gimnasio Campestre	Colombia		
Colegio Anglo-Colombiano	Colombia		
Colegio Gran Bretaña	Colombia		
Colegio Los Nogales	Colombia		
Collège Alpin International Beau Soleil	Switzerland		
College De La Salle – Amman	Jordan		
Collingwood School	Canada		
Craighouse School	Chile		
Dainfern College	South Africa	Podar Pearl School	Qatar
Daly College	India		
Dhirubhai Ambani International School	India		
Dover College	United Kingdom		
Elaraki School	Morocco		
Elmwood School	Canada		
Enka Schools	Turkey		
Ermitage International School of France	France		
Felsted School	United Kingdom		
Fern Hill School	Canada		
Fountain Valley School of Colorado	United States		
GEMS Modern Academy	United Arab Emirates		
Genesis Global School	India		
Geraldton Grammar School	Australia		
Glenlyon Norfolk School	Canada		
Godspell College	Argentina		
Green Hills Academy	Rwanda		
Hackley School	United States		
Hebron Academy	United States		
Herlufsholm School	Denmark		
Him Academy Public School	India		
Holy Innocents' Episcopal School	United States		
Hotchkiss School	United States		
Hunan Concord College of Sino-Canada	China		
The Indian High School, Dubai	United Arab Emirates		
Indian School Al Ghubra	Oman		
Inter-Community School Zürich	Switzerland		
International Community School	Ghana		
International School of Kenya	Kenya		
Inventure Academy	India		
Ipswich Grammar School	Australia		
Ivanhoe Grammar School	Australia		
Jhamkudevi Senior Secondary School	India		
Junior and Senior High School of Kogakuin University	Japan		
Kansai International Academy	Japan		
KC Public School	India		
Keimei Gakuen	Japan		
Keystone International School	Turkey		
Kilittasi School	Turkey		
Keystone Academy	China		
King's Academy	Jordan		
King's College, Auckland	New Zealand		
Kinross Wolaroi School	Australia		
Klosterschule Roßleben	Germany		
L K Singhania Education Centre	India		
Lakefield College School	Canada		
Landheim Schondorf	Germany		
Latymer Upper School	United Kingdom		
The Lawrence School, Sanawar	India		
Lawrence School, Lovedale	India		
Le Salésien	Canada		
Linden Hall High School	Japan		
Lindisfarne Anglican Grammar School	Australia		
Lower Canada College	Canada		
MacLachlan College	Canada		
Maria's Public School	India		
Markham College	Peru		
Matthew Flinders Anglican College	Australia		
Mayo College	India		
Mayo College Girls School	India		
Michael Ham Memorial College	Argentina		
Miles Bronson Residential School	India		
Milton Abbey School	United Kingdom		
MLC School Sydney	Australia		
Millwood School	United States		
Modern School, Barakhamba Road	India		
Mody School	India		
New England Girls' School	Australia		
Newcastle Grammar School	Australia		
Nightingale-Bamford School	United States		
Ningbo Huamao International School	China		
Nishimachi International School	Japan		
Oakleigh Grammar	Australia		
Okinawa Amicus International School	Japan		
Olive Tree International Academy	China		
Oxley College	Australia		
Palmer Trinity School	United States		
Paradis International School	Romania		
Park City Day School	United States		
Pathways World School	India		
Penryn College	South Africa		
Pinegrove School	India		
Providence Day School	United States		
Radford College	Australia		
Rajkumar College, Raipur	India		
Rajkumar College, Rajkot	India		
Rajmata Krishna Kumari Girls' Public School	India		
RBIS International School	Thailand		
RDFZ	China		
Regent's International School	Thailand		
Regents International School Pattaya	Thailand		
Renaissance International School Saigon	Vietnam		
Riverdale Country School	United States		
Rockhampton Grammar School	Australia		
Rockport School	United Kingdom		
Roedean School	United Kingdom		
Rosseau Lake College	Canada		
Rothesay Netherwood School	Canada		
Ryde School with Upper Chine	United Kingdom		
SAI International School	India		
Saint Andrew's School	United States		
San Silvestre School	Peru		
Sarala Birla Academy	India		
Scarborough College	United Kingdom		
Schule Birklehof	Germany		
Scindia Kanya Vidyalaya	India		
Scotch College, Perth	Australia		
Scotch Oakburn College	Australia		
SEK International School Ciudalcampo	Spain		
Seth Anandram Jaipuria School	India		
Shenzhen (Nanshan) Concord College of Sino-Canada	China		
Shiv Nadar School, Noida	India		
Shirakatsy Lyceum	Armenia		
Singapore International School, Mumbai	India		
St Andrew's College	South Africa		
St Andrew's School for Girls	South Africa		
St Andrews School, Turi	Kenya		
St. Clement's School	Canada		
St Constantine's School	Tanzania		
St Cyprian's School, Cape Town	South Africa		
St George's Diocesan School	Namibia		
St George's Grammar School	South Africa		
St John's-Ravenscourt School	Canada		
St Mary's School, Colchester	United Kingdom		
St. Mildred's-Lightbourn School	Canada		
St. Paul's Co-educational College	Hong Kong, China		
St Philip's College	Australia		
St Stithians Boys' College	South Africa		
St Stithians Girls' College	South Africa		
St. George's College	Peru		
Stanford Lake College	South Africa		
Starehe Boys' Centre and School	Kenya		
Step by Step School	India		
Stiftung Louisenlund	Germany		
Strathcona-Tweedsmuir School	Canada		
Sunbeam School Lahartara	India		
Sunbeam Suncity (School & Hostel)	India		
Sunshine Montessori School	Canada		
Tamagawa Academy	Japan		
The Affiliated High School of Peking University's Dalton Academy	China		
The Armidale School	Australia		
The Athenian School	United States		
The Bermuda High School	Bermuda		
The British School	Indonesia		
The British School	India		
The Doon School	India		
The Emerald Heights International School	India		
The English School (Colegio de Inglaterra)	Colombia		
The Hutchins School			
The Hyderabad Public School	India		
The Kingsley School	United Kingdom		
The Lyceum School	Pakistan		
The Marvelwood School	United States		
The Millennium School	United Arab Emirates		
The Private Realschule Gut Warnberg	Germany		
The Punjab Public School	India		
The Sagar School	India		
The Samworth Church Academy	United Kingdom		
The Sanskaar Valley School	India		
The Scindia School	India		
The Shri Ram School	India		
The Southport School	Australia		
Tiger Kloof Educational Institution	South Africa		
Transylvania College	Romania		
Trevor Day School	United States		
Trinity Anglican School	Australia		
Trivandrum International School	India		
United World College of South East Asia	Singapore		
Vidya Devi Jindal School	India		
Vivek High School	India		
Welham Boys' School	India		
Welham Girls' School	India		
Westfield School	United Kingdom		
Westminster School	Australia		
Whanganui Collegiate School	New Zealand		
Wilderness School	Australia		
Windermere School	United Kingdom		
Woodleigh School	Australia		
Wycliffe College	United Kingdom		
Wyoming Seminary	United States		
Yadavindra Public School Patiala	India		
Yakumo Academy	Japan		
