= Dyke Brown =

American lawyer

Dyke Brown (1915–2006) was best known for founding The Athenian School in Danville, California.

== Early life and academic career ==
Dyke was born Franklin Moore Brown in San Francisco, on April 16, 1915. He was the son of Frank A. Brown and Dorothy Gary Moore. According to his niece, Nancy Woodward, the name "Dyke" began in early childhood. His mother used to call him a "cute little tyke". When his brother Gary mispronounced "tyke" as "dyke", the nickname stuck. His high school years were spent at Piedmont High School; he graduated in 1932. Before enrolling in college, he traveled in Europe and attended the Schule Schloss Salem school in Germany, then under the direction of the noted educator, Kurt Hahn.

Returning to the United States, Brown attended the University of California, graduating from Berkeley in 1936 with a B.A. with highest honors and Phi Beta Kappa. He studied at the University of Oxford as a Rhodes Scholar from 1936 to 1938, earning a B.A. and M.A. in politics, economics, and philosophy. While at Oxford, Brown visited Italy, where he met his future wife, Catherine Whitely, known to all as Kate. From Berkeley, Brown went to Yale Law School, where he earned a Juris Doctor degree in 1941, and was immediately hired as assistant dean and assistant professor of law by Yale.

== World War II ==
America entered World War II after the attack on Pearl Harbor, December 7, 1941. Brown, like many of his generation, immediately enlisted in the navy, and was appointed flag lieutenant and aide to Admiral Jules James, commander of the Sixth Naval District in Charleston, South Carolina. Brown was on active duty from 1942 to 1945.

== 1946 to 1962: From the practice of law to the Ford Foundation ==
After the war, Brown returned to San Francisco and his law career. He first worked for John Francis Neylan (William Randolph Hearst's general counsel) and then in 1949, became a partner at the firm of Cooley, Crowley and Gaither.

Horace Rowan Gaither was commissioned by the Ford Foundation's board of trustees to create a series of studies to guide the Foundation's growth. In 1949, Gaither recruited Brown to serve as an assistant director of the Study for the Ford Foundation on Policy and Program.

In 1953, Dyke was elected a Vice president of the Ford Foundation, with an emphasis on the Foundation's Public Affairs Program and the Program in Economic Development and Administration. The Brown family moved from California to Scarsdale, New York. Brown's interest in educating youth grew out of several sources: his own children's educational experiences and his work for the Ford Foundation in youth development and preventing juvenile delinquency.

He conceived the desire to start a boarding school that would embody his ideas.

== The Athenian years, 1962 to 1977 ==
Brown left the Ford Foundation in 1962, and returned to the San Francisco Bay Area to raise funds and look for land for the school. In 1963, a portion of the Blackhawk Ranch was purchased, and construction began.

The school opened with 9th and 10th grades, in the fall of 1965. Brown continued to serve as the founder and chief fundraiser, working toward his goal of four distinct campuses sharing a common core of facilities.

In the early years, Brown also taught a seminar to upperclassmen in constitutional law.

== Activities after the Athenian years ==
Brown retired from active service to Athenian in 1977, focusing his interest on younger children. He coordinated with the Hewlett Foundation to create the Child Development Project.

Brown was strongly influenced by Kurt Hahn, the German educator who founded Outward Bound and Gordonstoun in Scotland. The conferences of schools influenced by Hahn's educational ideas is called Round Square. For many years, Athenian was the only American member of the Round Square conference.
