= Mekaela Academies =

Kenyan education organization

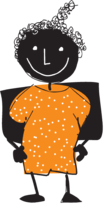

Location
- Ukunda/ Diani Kwale County Kenya

District information
- Type: non-profit organization
- Motto: Learn to make a difference
- Grades: Grade 1- 6, Grade 7-9, Grade 10-12
- Established: 1993
- Schools: 7

Students and staff
- Students: 2,200
- Teachers: 150
- Staff: 50

Other information
- Website: mekaela.co.ke

Mekaela Academies is the umbrella organization for seven charitable private schools in Kenya, about 50 Km south of Mombasa. The schools are among the top performing in Kwale County.

== History ==
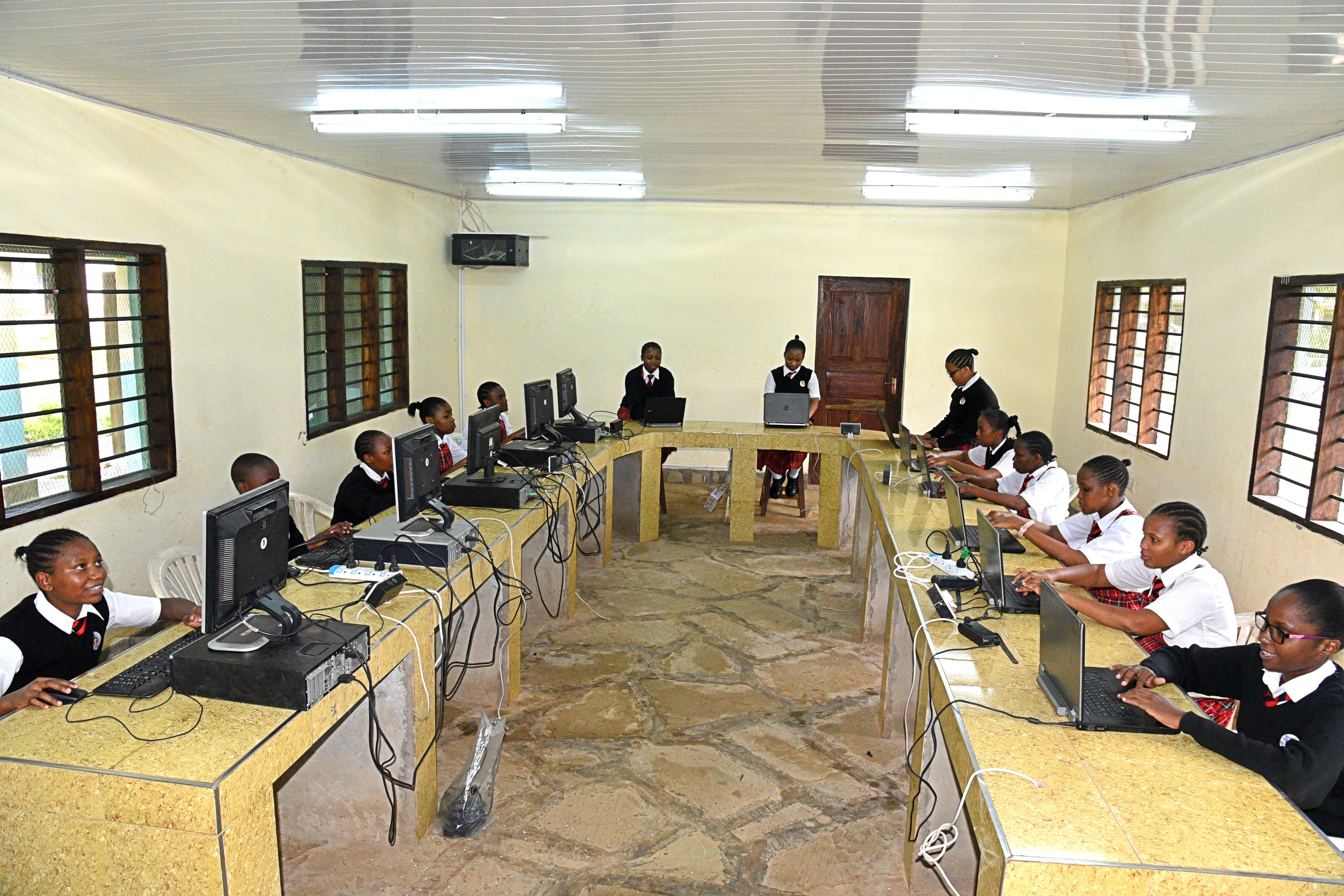
Lulu Girls' students having a practical session in the Modern Computer Lab.

Mekaela Academies was founded in 1993 by members of the German charitable society "Watoto e.V." (Watoto means "children" in Swahili). The school's mission is to provide the best possible education to its students so they may later obtain a university degree or find a job through vocational training. The vision is that Mekaela Academies alumni can create their own better future.

The construction of the schools was financed by donations from Watoto e.V. An exception is Lulu Girls High School, which is owned by the German One-World-Foundation from Oldenburg, but the school is fully integrated into Mekaela Academies.

The schools operate as private schools to warrant that the project may be built, run, and managed without interference from the government. The organization is non-profit and observes charitable principles. Surpluses, should they occur, must be distributed to the pupils and their parents or to the staff.

The associated Watoto e.V. runs a sponsorship program for children of needy families. All students also receive free basic medical care under the Mekaela Micro-Medical Scheme (MMMS).

== The Schools ==
The Primary section consists of classes from Grade 1 through to Standard 8, while the Secondary section consists of classes from Form 1 through to Form 4.

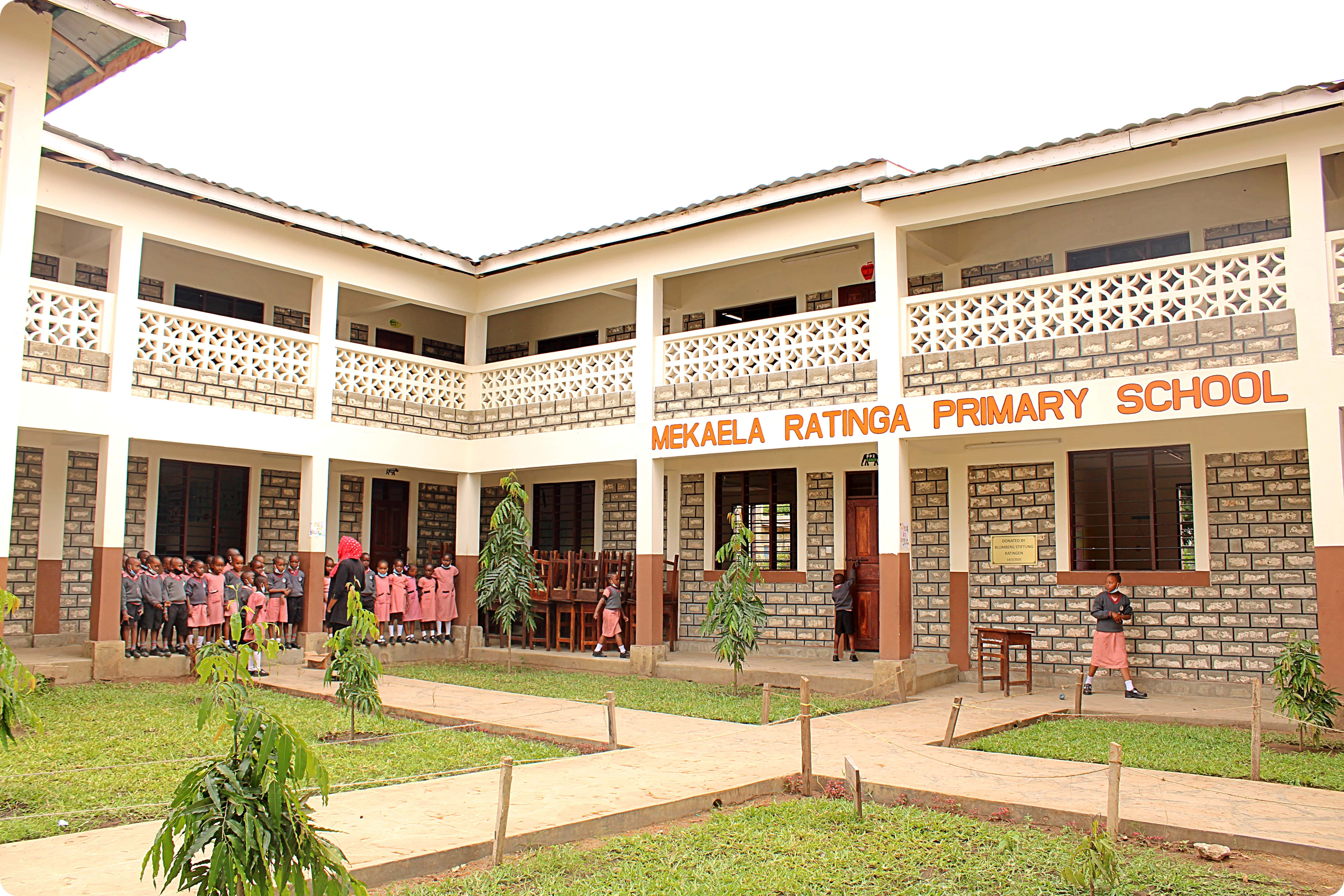
The New Tuition Block at Ratinga Primary School

In total, 2,200 children attend the schools:

- Manuel Alexander Primary School (Primary)
- Likunda Primary School (Primary)
- Ratinga Primary School (Primary)
- Weber Primary School (Primary)
- Mekaela Senior High School (Secondary)
- Mekaela Junior School-Lulu Campus (Secondary)

- Mekaela Online Academy (Online)

The number of employees of Mekaela Academies is about 200.

More than half of all students are supported by direct sponsorships and scholarship programmes from various charitable organizations.

Three of the schools have a boarding school area (Likunda Primary, Mekaela Junior School -Lulu Campus & Mekaela Senior High School), which is available for children from the age of 10. On from Std. 8 in primary school and in secondary school, boarding is mandatory for students. The education of the boarding school students is based on the principles of the educationalist Kurt Hahn.

The school covers a significant part of their primary food requirements with produce from two farms they run.

=== Innovation in Digital Education ===
As a response to the challenges posed by the COVID-19 pandemic in the Education sector in Kenya; Mekaela Academies through support from DEG developed and built the Mekaela Online Academy Studio Complex, which comprises 16 fully-furnished studios, with state-of-the-art equipment. The complex runs on Green-Energy (Solar).

Shule Pepe (an Online Learning Management System, developed by Mekaela Academies) covers the entire curriculum with retention exercises that raise students’ grades, help with lesson planning, and records every student's profile and results. All content on Shule Pepe is designed and curated by experienced teachers from Mekaela Academies.

In November 2021, Shule Pepe was awarded the Bronze Mark of Recognition as part of the Top 100 organizations embracing enterprise IT innovations in Africa.

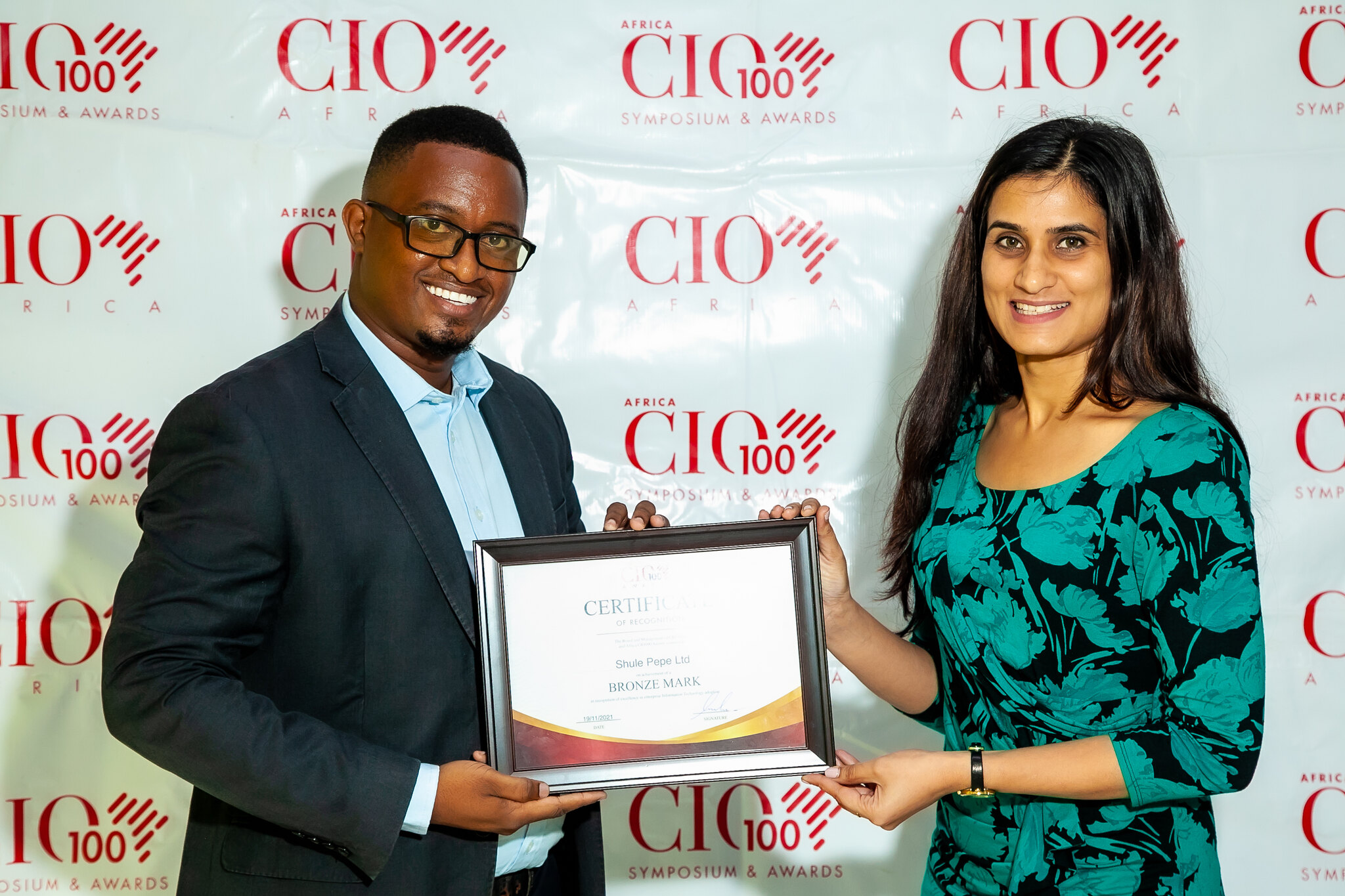
Martin Njeru, the System Administrator Shule Pepe received the Award from the Director-CIO Africa Ms. Aliza Thorbani

== Other linked organizations ==
Mekaela Academies also runs an employment agency (Noble Domestic Agency) which provides jobs to family members of the pupils.

Updated: 06.2022
