= The Lichfield Festival =

English art festival

Lichfield Festival is an annual multi-art-form Festival held in Lichfield, Staffordshire, England each July. Performances include drama, dance, film, literature, visual arts, jazz, folk, classical and world music. Performances take place principally in the medieval Lichfield Cathedral and The Hub at St Mary's, alongside other churches and performing arts venues across the City. The Festival now also runs an annual Literature Festival each March, a Chamber Music Festival each October, and at least one Christmas concert per year. A year-round Learning and Participation programme includes audience development schemes, providing free music tuition in local schools, and supporting the next generation of young creatives and performers.

== History ==
=== 1981–1989 ===
The Lichfield Festival was founded in 1981 by the then Dean of Lichfield Cathedral, John Lang; and Gordon Clark, who was head of music at Abbotsholme School and Artistic Director of the Abbotsholme Arts Society. Clark, while continuing his work at Abbotsholme, was the Festival's first Artistic Director (the two jobs continued to be under the aegis of a single person until 2009); and the founding team was completed by Financial Director John Round and Patrick Lichfield, then Earl of Lichfield, who was one of the first financial contributors.

The inaugural Festival opened on 3 July 1982 with the Band of the Royal Marines processing from the market square in Lichfield to the west door of the Cathedral, which John Lang described as 'a kind of trumpet call to the City to be aware of our plans for pleasures to come'. Further highlights of the opening year included performances by the Hallé and Royal Philharmonic Orchestras; and the Cambridge Footlights Revue, featuring the then relatively unknown Stephen Fry, Hugh Laurie, and Emma Thompson. The Endellion Quartet were artists in residence and returned many times in subsequent years. There were also international contributions from the Japanese Suzuki Tour Company, the French Rouen Officium Pastorum and the German Antiqua Cologne. As Lang said, all were 'a foretaste of what was to become normal festival fayre'.

Highlights from the rest of the eighties included the visit of sitar legend Ravi Shankar together with tabla virtuoso Alla Rakha in 1984 – a year which also saw the Festival's one and only foray into musical theatre, with the Lichfield Cathedral School's production of Joseph and the Amazing Technicolor Dreamcoat – a visit from Oscar Peterson in 1985, and skiffle Legend Lonnie Donegan came along with his dancing sunshine band in 1987. The Festival also experimented with a two-day show-jumping event in 1989, which managed a reprise in 1990 but hasn't been heard of since. In 1985, conductor Valery Gergiev, pianist Evgeny Kissin, and violinists Maxim Vengerov and Vadim Repin all received their UK debuts at the Lichfield Festival.

=== 1990–2001 ===
Gordon Clark's tenure as Artistic Director ended with his untimely death in August 1989. Clark was succeeded by Paul Spicer, the longest serving Artistic Director to date. Spicer sought to 'cater for all tastes and provide something for everyone'. Different thematic strands were brought into the programme to encourage what Spicer called 'cohesion and unity'. The first of these were the music of Mozart, Samuel Barber, and Cole Porter in 1991. The bi-centenary of Mozart's death in this year also saw the Festival's first opera – a full production of The Marriage of Figaro. The Festival acquired a logo – a stylised cello headstock with 'The Lichfield Festival' encircling it – and a Fringe, with events taking place in sixteen venues around the city, in 1994.

Spicer also introduced the concept of having a composer-in-residence to Lichfield, the first of whom was William Mathias, who was succeeded by Robert Saxton. Sir Michael Tippett was not a composer-in-residence, but did send in his best wishes in 1992.

Returning artists: András Schiff, Julian Lloyd Webber, Humphrey Lyttelton, Endellion Quartet, National Youth Jazz Orchestra, City of Birmingham Symphony Orchestra, Ex Cathedra, BBC Philharmonic.

=== 2002–2004 ===
Paul Spicer was followed by Meurig Bowen. Bowen had come from a job in Australia, and his first festival, in 2002, showed an increased antipodean influence which would point the way towards a general expansion of scope.

Some of the highlights included William Barton, an aboriginal didgeridoo player, who performed a European premiere of Peter Sculthorpe's Requiem for mixed chorus, didgeridoo and orchestra.

A new logo, typeface and corporate structure were introduced following Bowen's arrival, signalling a gentle loosening of the link between the Festival and the Cathedral. The closure of Lichfield Civic Hall in 2001 led to the use of venues including Sutton Coldfield Town Hall during the festivals of 2002/2003, while film screenings were moved to the theatre at the Friary School in Lichfield. In 2003 the Lichfield Garrick theatre, which had arisen quite literally from the ashes of the Civic Hall, was opened on the same night as that year's Festival, with a performance by the Jazz Jamaica All-Stars.

=== 2005–2009 ===
After a short three-year stint at Lichfield, Bowen left to take up a position with Aldeburgh Productions, and was succeeded in Lichfield by Richard Hawley, previously orchestra manager with the City of Birmingham Symphony Orchestra (CBSO).

Philip Glass performed a rare solo piano recital in 2007, while virtuoso double bass player François Rabbath made an extremely rare visit to England to perform at Lichfield in 2006, alongside rising British jazz star Gwilym Simcock, who was an artist-in-residence in the same year. Simcock's 2006 residency also included the first ever non-London performance of the Gwilym Simcock Big Band and a major big band commission entitled The Lichfield Suite, which was subsequently programmed by the Cheltenham Jazz Festival, broadcast on BBC Radio 3, and shortlisted for a 2007 British Composer Award.

The 2007 Lichfield Festival was on a shortlist of 3 for a prestigious Royal Philharmonic Society 'concert series and Festivals' award. Alongside Philip Glass's recital was a unique collaborative performance between Tunisian Oud player Dhafer Youssef, Norwegian jazz Trumpeter Arve Henriksen and Armenian Duduk player Djivan Gasparyan.

Festival 2008 opened with Marin Alsop's final performance as principal conductor of the Bournemouth Symphony Orchestra. Mexican rockers Los de Abajo performed at the Lichfield Garrick, along with jazz vocal group The Passion, The Puppini Sisters, the Bryan Corbett Quartet, Rainer Hersch, Sir Roy Strong and The Hairy Bikers. 1928 Indian Silent film Shiraz was brought out of the British Film Institute Archives and a new score was commissioned and performed live by the Sabri Ensemble. The Ukulele Orchestra of Great Britain performed to an audience of 900 at Lichfield Cathedral, and Gwilym Simcock returned as part of Acoustic Triangle, who together with the Sacconi Quartet performed specially composed music in the round.

The 2009 Festival opened – unusually – in the Lichfield Garrick, with a performance by 'Chairman' Ray Gelato and his band the Giants. The Ukulele Orchestra of Great Britain returned with their 'Ukulelescope' project in conjunction with the BFI, where the group performed specially composed music in accompaniment to a series of films from the BFI archives. The extraordinary vocal sounds of the Great Voices of Bulgaria filled the Cathedral, as did Fyfe Hutchens – otherwise known as Fyfe Dangerfield – who performed the only late-night concert of that year, improvising on the Lady Chapel piano for exactly 60 minutes, uninterrupted.

== Present day ==
Richard Hawley left to take up a Clore Fellowship following 2009's Lichfield Literature. He was succeeded by Fiona Stuart, previously artistic director of the Chorlton Arts Festival in Manchester and the first female director in the Festival's near 30-year history. The 2010 Festival saw the introduction of several new programming stands. One of the most popular was a 'Young Artist' series held at lunchtimes in St Chad's church and featuring performers from all the Royal Colleges of Music.

Other additions included a late-night Jazz series held at a new Festival venue, the George IV pub in the town centre. An eclectic mix of bands formed from Birmingham's cobweb collective played to sell-out houses on seven of the ten nights of the Festival.

Owing to works being carried out on the masonry and windows of Lichfield Cathedral's Lady Chapel, the Cathedral presbytery was called into use as a replacement performance space. Notable performances there came from Poet Laureate Carol Ann Duffy, and Welsh harpist Catrin Finch performing Bach's Goldberg Variations by candlelight. The venue also housed the return to prominence in the Festival of Lichfield Cathedral's musicians, in the form of the Cathedral Choir and the Cathedral Chamber Choir.

Highlights of the programme in the Nave included a performance of Vivaldi's four-seasons by former Young Musician of the Year Nicola Benedetti; The three-year-old Festival Chorus performed an evening of a cappella music.

== Lichfield Literature ==
October 2006 saw the First Lichfield Literature Weekend, a spin-off from the summer Festival. 3 days of talks from authors including John Carey, David Crystal and Robert Hutchinson took place in the city's George Hotel. The Literature Weekend was soon established as an annual fixture in the city's calendar. A minor re-branding exercise saw the event renamed simply Lichfield Literature in 2009. A change motivated in no small part by the expansion in scope which saw events held at multiple venues around the city and running for four days. The 2010 event encompassed a week for the first time and included talks from comedian Jo Brand, Labour politicians Tony Benn and Roy Hattersley, actor Ron Moody and the team behind the BBC's smash-hit adaptation of Elizabeth Gaskell's Cranford Novels.

== Out-of-Town events ==
The first instance of a local church being used as a concert venue for the Lichfield Festival occurred in 1992, when St. John's Hospital Chapel in Lichfield and St. Matthew's Hospital Chapel in Burntwood were added to the roster.

From 1997–2007 the events in Lichfield were augmented by concerts in churches around Staffordshire, with the aim to provide exposure to the arts for as wide an audience as possible under the Lichfield Festival banner. It was then and remains policy to avoid, as much as possible, repetition of venues, and performances have taken place in Yoxall, Alrewas, Hawksyard, Hoar Cross, amongst many others.

From 2008 the country church series was relabelled as FEAST (Festival Events Around Staffordshire), with the scope for venues, beyond churches and beyond the traditional understanding of what a venue can be, to be brought into the Festival fold.

Other events take place annually at Swinfen Hall Hotel, and within the city St Michael's church and St Chad's church are now regular venues. These events have tended to have a healthy bias towards chamber music and smaller recitals.

== Festival market ==
In 1995 the Festival organised the first Medieval Market, taking place in the Cathedral Close. Conceived originally as a one-off which coincided with the wider celebrations of the Cathedral's 800th anniversary, it proved successful – attracting up to 30,000 visitors – that it became an annual fixture. In 2009 the Market took on a Georgian theme, in recognition of the tercentenary of the birth of Lichfield-born Samuel Johnson. 2010 saw the launch of the first, theme-free 'Festival Market', a showcase of arts and crafts across the region.

== Education ==
Each year Lichfield schools participate in education projects, culminating in a performance in Lichfield Cathedral. Previous projects have included a Gamelan orchestra; cellist Matthew Barley's Between the Notes; Numerous workshops on everything from drama to close-harmony singing, amongst a huge range of other projects.

== Volunteers ==
Beyond a small core team the Festival is staffed almost entirely by volunteers. In 2010 the age range of the volunteers was from 15 to 82. T-shirts became the standard uniform for all volunteers from 2009.

== Fireworks ==
Since its inception the Festival has been closed with a firework display, attracting up to 10,000 attendees. For the first two decades or so these were held with the spectators arrayed around Stowe Pool. Health and Safety concerns from nearby residents forced a switch to Beacon Park in the early 2000s, but the fireworks display was discontinued in 2012.
