= St Philip's College (Australia) =

Location
- 2 Ulpaya Road; Alice Springs, Northern Territory; Australia; 23°41′23″S 133°53′00″E

Information
- School type: High School
- Motto: To Strive, To Seek, To Care With Heart
- Established: 1965
- Principal: Leslie Tilbrook
- Grades: 7–12
- Enrolment: 550
- Hours in school day: 08:20 – 14:55

St Philip's College is an independent Uniting Church, coeducational high school in Alice Springs, in the Northern Territory of Australia.

== Description ==
St Philip's is a Uniting Church coeducational boarding and day school for students in Years 7–12. The school motto is "To Strive, To Seek, To Care With Heart".

The college is a member of the Round Square organisation. It has well-developed Outdoor Education and Performing Arts programs.

The college is situated on a single campus, a short distance north of the Alice Springs town centre and ANZAC Hill. St Philip's facilities include the Discovery Centre, The Minnamurra Hall, the Bruce Reid Sports Centre with a rock-climbing wall, and facilities for basketball, volleyball, tennis and cricket. Other facilities include the Swag Chapel, Fred McKay Education Centre, library, and the Chris Tudor Centre which includes the Rivergum Cafe, food technology and science rooms.

== Governance ==
In 2023 Leslie Tilbrook became school principal, succeeding Roger Herbert. Prior to Roger Herbert becoming principal in 2016, Chris Tudor AO was Headmaster of St Philip's College for 30 years ~ 1986 to 2016. When Chris became Headmaster, St Philip's was only a boarding facility and Chris, (together with fellow College Life Governor, Jan Heaslip) worked tirelessly to make St Philip's both a day and boarding school. The day school opened in 1989.

== Academic Results ==
St Philip's performs well in overall academic results, with most students successfully obtaining Northern Territory Certificate of Education and Training (NCTET) and TER rankings.

In 2025, St Philip's College was ranked among the Top 100 private schools in Australia. The list compiled by News Corp, assessed schools on a vairety of measures.

Most years students from St Philip's are in the Top 20 list of Year 12 students. In 2024, Ramona Dooley was named the NT's Top Indigenous Student. Edward Tikoft, a senior student at St Philip's College, achieved the highest overall ranking out of all Northern Territory Certificate of Education (NTCE) students in the state in 2008.
