= Trivandrum International School =

International school in Korani, Thiruvananthapuram, Kerala, India

Location
- Edackode PO; Thiruvananthapuram, Kerala 695104; India
- Coordinates: 8.6571°N 76.8386°E

Information
- School type: Private, International school
- Motto: "Learning is for life"
- Language: English
- Houses: Agni, Prithvi, Vayu, Jalam
- Website: trins.org

Trivandrum International School is a co-educational international school situated in Thiruvananthapuram, Kerala, India. It is situated 6 km from Attingal Town, 20 km from Varkala Town, 23 km from Thiruvananthapuram City and 40 km from Kollam City. The school offers the International Baccalaureate, International General Certificate of Secondary Education and is accredited by the Cambridge International Examinations and the Council for the Indian School Certificate Examinations. Trivandrum International School is the only school in Kerala which is a member of the Round Square International school league.

The school opened in 2003 with Mr Hillebrand as headmaster.

Trivandrum International School has four houses, each representing an element: Agni (fire), Jalam (water), Prithvi (earth), and Vayu (air). The school holds sporting events like Sports Day, an annual athletic meet, and a swimming gala.

There are three annexes for pre-kindergarten children named TRINS Early Learning Centres within Thiruvananthapuram city. They are located at Vellayambalam, Kazhakootam and Belhaven Street, Kowdiar.
