= Sir David Hoare, 9th Baronet =

British banker (born 1935)

Sir David Hoare, Bt
- Born: David John Hoare; October 8, 1935 (age 90)
- Education: Eton College; Aiglon College
- Occupation: Banker
- Title: 8th Baronet Hoare, of Barn Elms
- Spouse(s): Mary Cardew 1965-1978 (div); Virginia Menzies, 1984-
- Children: Simon Merrick Hoare
- Parent(s): Sir Peter William Hoare, 7th Bt; Laura Ray Esplen

Sir David Hoare, 9th Baronet, of Barn Elms, (born 1935) is a British banker. He served as the chairman of Hoares from 2001 to 2006.

== Life and career ==
David John Hoare was born in 1935 and was educated at Eton College and Aiglon College. He did his national service in the British Army in 1954. He then spent two years in Australia and New Zealand, and worked as a banker in South Africa.

In 1959, he joined the family bank, C. Hoare & Co. He served as a managing partner from 1964 to 1988, as its deputy chairman from 1988 to 2001, and as its chairman from 2001 to 2006. He serves on its board of directors.

== Personal life ==
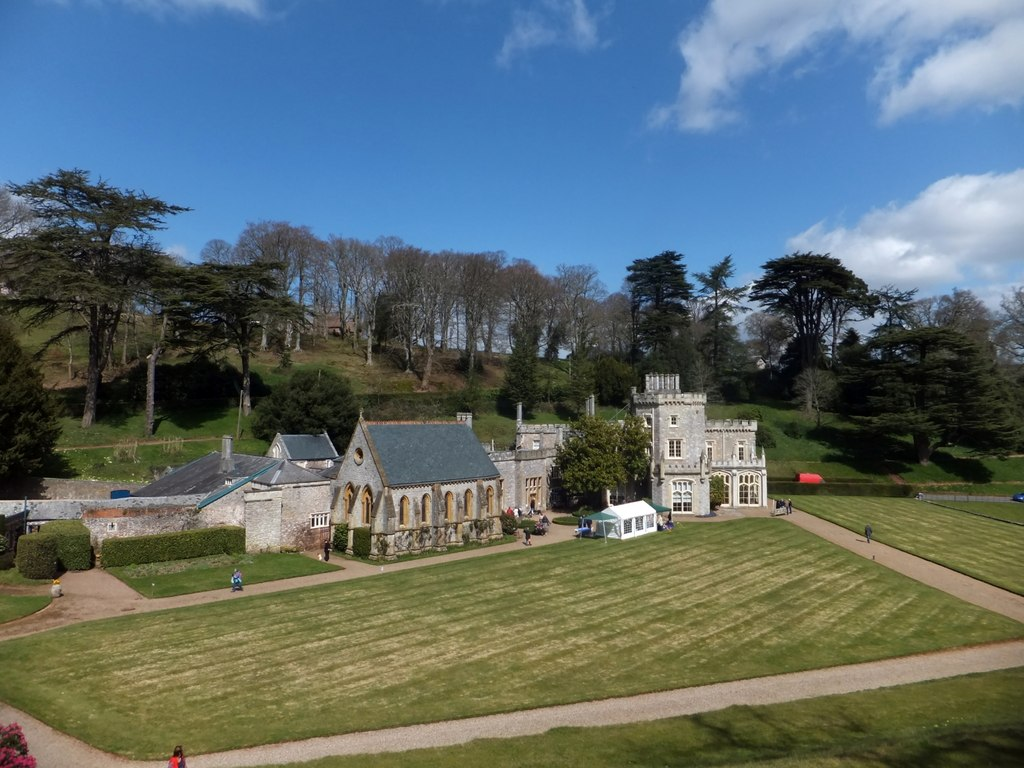
Luscombe Castle

From 1965 to 1978, Hoare was married to Mary Cardew; they had one son, Simon. In 1984, he married Virginia Menzies.

He inherited Luscombe Castle in Devon. He is a member of White's, a private members' club in London, and the Royal St George's Golf Club, a golf club in Sandwich, Kent.

Baronetage of Great Britain
Preceded by Peter Hoare	Baronet (of Barn Elms); 2004–Present	Incumbent
