= Infinite Monkeys Appy Pie =

App creation software

Infinite Monkeys
- Developers: Infinite Monkeys (Pte Ltd); Appy Pie
- Initial release: December 2011
- Operating system: iOS, Android
- Type: application framework
- Website: appypie.com/app-builder/appmaker

Infinite Monkeys is a self-service platform that allows users to create native apps for iPhone, Android, and HTML5 mobile websites with no coding knowledge.

== History ==
Infinite Monkeys is headquartered in Singapore. The company was founded by Alice Gugelev, David Hoare, and Jay Shapiro. The beta version of Infinite Monkeys was released in September 2011 and went live in December 2011 at the AppNation conference in San Francisco. The company is a virtual organization with staff contracted via oDesk and distributed across six continents.

The platform has a web-based graphic user interface (GUI) that uses a WYSIWYG editor and allows users to take existing web content and third-party feeds to generate apps for iPhone, Android, and HTML5-supported smartphones. Infinite Monkeys uses a drag-and-drop process to organize widgets on the app screen and features a dashboard for users to manage in-app subscriptions, messages, and analytics.

Infinite Monkeys acquired by Appy Pie in 2020.

== See also ==
- WYSISYG editor
- Mobile app
- Mobile operating system
