= Roger Sanders =

American doctor

Roger Cobban Sanders (born June 17, 1936) is an American doctor specializing in ultrasound and radiology. Originally from the United Kingdom, he obtained a degree in physiology at Oxford University, from the Oxford Clinical Medical School. In 1970 Sanders traveled to the United States to begin a one-year teaching position at Johns Hopkins University in Baltimore, Maryland. During this time the University was presented a bistable ultrasound system, at the time the only one in Maryland, which Sanders was asked to oversee and use. Eventually he became professor of Radiology, Urology, Obstetric, and Gynecology, as well as director of Ultrasound at the University. He helped develop the department within the University, and it has grown into one of the foremost radiology institutions in the United States, having been named the "Cream of the Crop" by Medical Imaging Magazine in April 2007.

In 1990, Sanders left to form his own practice in Baltimore, The Ultrasound Institute of Baltimore and to work part time at the university of Maryland. Currently he lives i San Diego and works part-time at New Mexico Sonographics telereporting gynecological ultrasound studies. Sanders has written nine books on Ultrasound & Sonography, including "Clinical Sonography: A Practical Guide", which is now in its fifth edition, and over 150 peer-reviewed articles. He is generally recognized as one of the pioneers of the use of Ultrasound in relation to Obstetrics and Gynecology, and has been recognized for his work with the Biparietal diameter among other work in the field. He is a fellow of several different Societies in the field of Ultrasound, including the Society of Radiology in Ultrasound, the American College of Radiology, and the American Institute of Ultrasound in Medicine (the AIUM), the latter awarding him the Presidential Award in 1984, and the Joseph H. Holmes Pioneer Award in 2001.
