= Kansai International Academy =

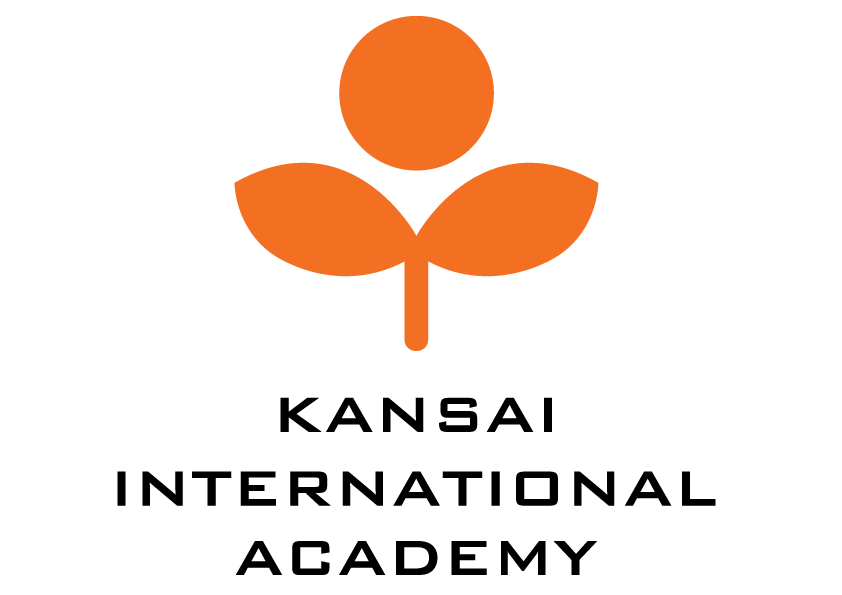

Location
- 4-1-31 Shinzaikeminami-cho Nada-ku; Kobe, Hyogo, 〒657-0864; Japan
- Coordinates: 34°42′17″N 135°14′13″E

Information
- Type: Private/co-educational
- Founded: 2001
- Director: Kumiko Nakamura
- Campus Director: Hiroko Takagi
- Years offered: pre-K to grade 9
- Enrollment: Approx. 500
- Campuses: 15
- Colour: Orange
- Website: kansai-intlschool.jp

Kansai International Academy is a private group of international schools pre-K through grade 9 in Japan, they are Kansai International School and Sakura International School.

== History ==
The school was founded in 2001 as a kindergarten but as of 2015, KIA became an International Baccalaureate Organization (IBO) Primary Years Program (PYP) school. As of 2016, it is the only school in the world offering the PYP in Japanese in Japan. KIA also became an IB Diploma Programme (DP) school in 2020. The students study the core subjects areas (language, mathematics, social studies, and sciences) in both English and Japanese as well as having extra curricular classes. In 2016, the Kobe campus opened its doors to the first junior high school class.

== Campuses ==
There are a total of 13 campuses in the Kansai region and Kanto region. 4 in Osaka (Higashi-Osaka, Hirakata, Tennoji Nini, Tennoji Lucas), 1 in Kyoto, 4 in Hyogo (Kobe, Ashiya, Akashi, Himeji) 1 in Kanagawa (Yokohama Aoba), and 6 in Tokyo (Yokohama, Bunkyo, Chiyoda, Azabu, Nihonbashi, and Setagaya).

== Early Learning Center (ELC) ==
ELC has a curriculum inspired by various pedagogical approaches such as Montessori education and Reggio Emilia approach. ELC classes are for children aged from 1 to 3.

== Kindergarten ==
The Kindergarten program at KIA is available to students aged 3–6 years old at 11 campuses in the Kansai and Kanto areas. The curriculum focuses on developing students’ personal and social skills as well as developing foundational numeracy and literacy skills. The students spend the majority of the day speaking English. At the Ashiya, Kobe and Higashiosaka campuses, all students have an hour of Japanese class each day, whereas at other campuses Japanese is offered as an after school elective class.

== Elementary ==
KIA Elementary is housed at the Kobe campus and spans from grades 1–6. The school year follows the Japanese school year, beginning in April and ending in March of the following year. In April 2015, the elementary program was the world's first school authorized to deliver the International Baccalaureate Primary Years Program in a dual-language English & Japanese curriculum. As a dual-language school, the elementary curriculum is fully bilingual, with students engaging in lessons in both English and Japanese together. Additional subjects such as music, gym, and karate are provided by specialist teachers, and the after-school program provides opportunities for additional studies in French, Chinese, calligraphy, and various test-prep courses.
