= Clore =

Clore is a surname. Notable people with the surname include:

- Charles Clore (1904–1979), British financier, retail and property magnate and philanthropist
- G. Marius Clore (born 1955), British/American molecular biophysicist
- Joanna Clore, character in the British sitcom Green Wing, played by Pippa Haywood
- Walter Clore (1911–2003), pioneer in wine growing and agricultural research in Washington State

== See also ==
- Clore Gallery at the Tate Britain art gallery in London, which houses work by J. M. W. Turner
- Clore Garden at the Weizmann Institute of Science, a university and research institute in Rehovot, Israel
- Charles Clore Park, beachfront public park in southwestern Tel Aviv, Israel
- Clore Leadership Programme, British programme of professional training and personal development
- Clore Tikva Primary School, Jewish voluntary aided primary school in Barkingside, London, England
- Claw
- Clor
