= Aiglon College =

Independent day and boarding school in Chesières-Villars, Vaud, Switzerland

Location
- Chesières-Villars, Vaud; Switzerland; 46.3°N 7.05°E

Information
- Type: Independent school, day and boarding
- Motto: "The balanced development of mind, body and spirit."
- Established: 1949
- Founder: John C. Corlette
- Chairman of Governors: Elisabeth van de Grampel
- Headmaster: Nicola Sparrow
- Gender: Co-educational
- Age: 9 to 18
- Enrollment: ~400
- Houses: 8 boarding houses
- Colours: Blue and red
- Alumni: Old Aiglonians
- Website: aiglon.ch

Aiglon College is a private co-educational boarding school in the canton of Vaud, Switzerland. Founded in 1949 by former Gordonstoun School teacher John C. Corlette, it is in the alpine village of Chesieres, close to the ski resort of Villars-sur-Ollon, 58 kilometers from Lausanne.

The school prepares its students for IGCSE exams and the IB Diploma, and is also known for its outdoor education and winter sports. All students are required to take part in expeditions. These include hiking, camping, mountain biking, kayaking, rock climbing, ski mountaineering, and other outdoor challenges.

== History ==
=== Early history ===
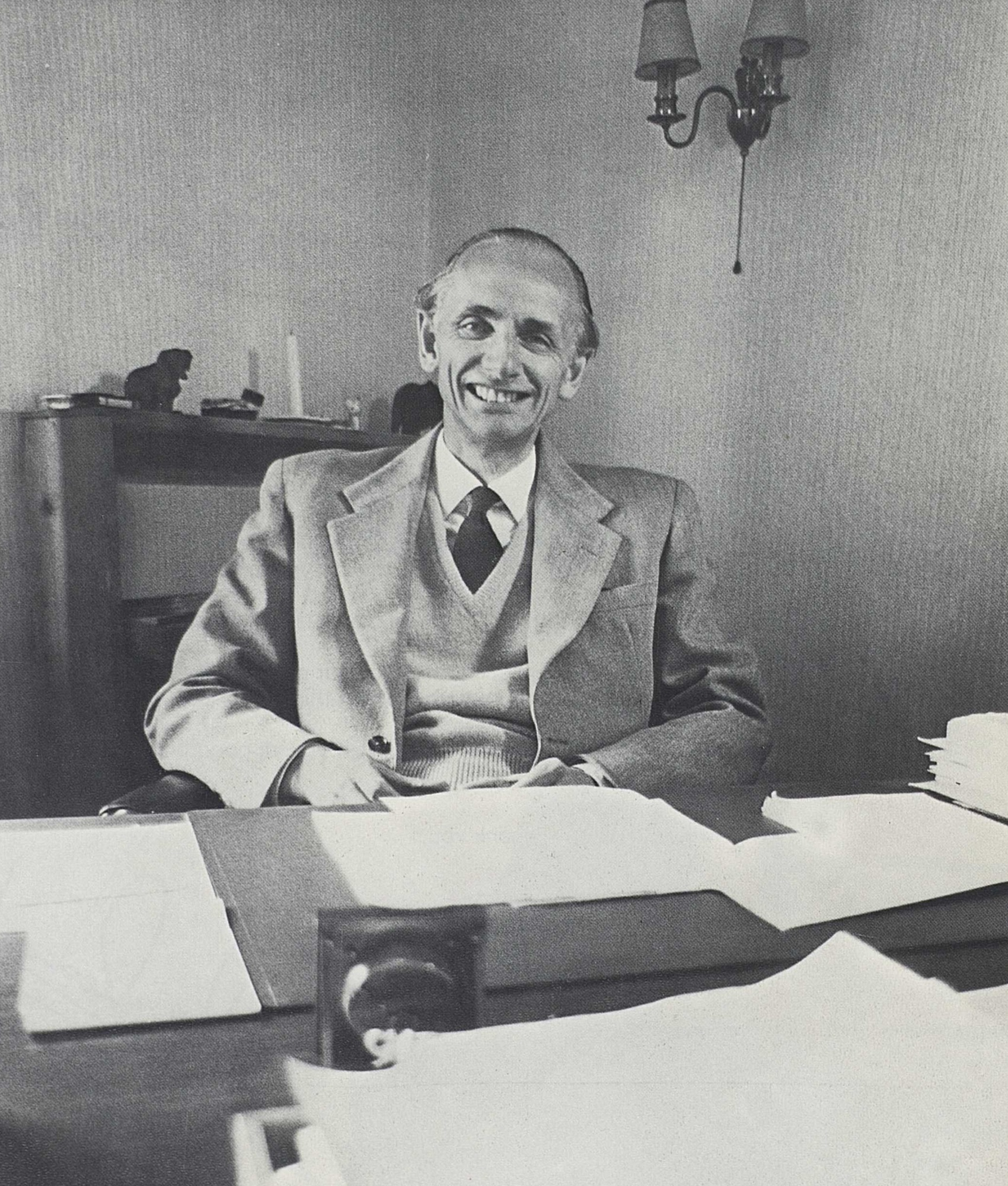
John Corlette

John Corlette opened the school in 1949, with six pupils. A former teacher at Gordonstoun, Corlette had sympathised with the theories of its founder, Kurt Hahn, and began to think about opening a school of his own.

Corlette suffered from ill health as a child and was never physically robust. This spurred a personal philosophy emphasizing stamina and toughness upon which the principles of Aiglon were founded. Corlette's decision to open a school in Switzerland was likely inspired by his own experience: he left Stowe at 16 to finish his education at Alpine College, having been sent there for the benefit of his health.

Following a financially precarious beginning, during which it rented various chalets, the school acquired its first permanent building with the purchase of the Hotel Beau-Site in 1955. Though founded as a school on the British model, by 1957 half the student body were American nationals – British parents at this time were put off by a combination of high fees and a weak pound.

In the late 1950s, another idea borrowed from Gordonstoun, the 'rank system', was implemented. This ranked boys according to merit, academic or otherwise, with extra privileges awarded to the higher ranked.

Though founded as a boys' school, Aiglon had occasionally admitted girls under exceptional circumstances; a female student, Marsi Paribatra, was enrolled in 1949. In 1968 the school became co-educational and 22 girls arrived that September.

=== Modern history ===
By the 1970s Aiglon had drawn some criticism for its long hours, with the working day running from 7:00 a.m. to 8:45 p.m. for the youngest children, and up to 11:00 p.m. for the oldest; the school maintained this was necessary to "develop the whole child" and set this against long vacation times, which lasted up to 11 weeks in the summer.

American author Allen Kurzweil recalled the eccentricities he encountered when he was sent to Aiglon in 1971.

Early morning were given over to fresh-air callisthenics, cold showers, and meditation. Afternoons were reserved for skiing and hiking. A retired opera singer with ill-fitting dentures taught elocution.

— Allen Kurzweil, The New Yorker, 2014

In line with the aims of its founder, school culture "placed a premium on stoic self-reliance" and injuries were a fact of life. During the academic year Kurzweil attended, one student lost the tips of two toes to frostbite, another almost died after falling into a crevasse, and a girl was permanently disfigured on the local slalom course after taking a bamboo gate too closely.

In 1972, Corlette stepped down as Executive Headmaster and took on the new title of Director and Founder. The school continued to grow, and during the 1983 academic year numbers reached approximately 250 pupils, made up of 142 nationalities.

Aiglon has long been among the world's ten most expensive boarding schools; as of 2022, annual fees were $135,000 (US). Yet, a 1995 Newsweek profile noted that high fees did not "buy luxury" at Aiglon, and student dormitories were surprisingly modest. Such "unpretentious surroundings" were said to be popular with wealthy parents who did not want their children to be living in too much comfort.

== Campus ==
Aiglon's campus consists of approximately 40 different buildings and chalets spread across approximately 60,000 m^{2}. The school has eight senior boarding houses and two junior houses. The village campus is a combination of existing chalets and renovated hotels joined with purpose-built buildings.

== Administration and organization ==
Aiglon College Junior School caters to boys and girls in years 5 to 8 (US grades 4–7). The Senior School caters to students in years 9 to 13 (US Grades 8–12). Students are prepared for GCSE and IGCSE examinations at the end of year 11 (Grade 10) and for the International Baccalaureate in the final two years. Throughout the school, the curriculum is taught in English, with the exception of languages and literature.

The school is run by a volunteer board of directors, which oversees the school's strategic direction and continued alignment with its founding principles. The school's senior management team responsible for its day-to-day management is called the School Council and is led by the Head of School.

In 2019 Nicola Sparrow became the first woman to lead the school.

== Notable alumni ==
- Shaun Agar, 6th Earl of Normanton (1946–2019), British cavalry officer, professional powerboat racer, impresario and entrepreneur
- David A. Anderson OC (Hon.), Canadian Member of Parliament, Queen's Privy Council (Ret), Olympian (silver medal, rowing, 1960)
- Abhishek Bachchan, Indian actor, co-owner Chennaiyin F.C., member of the Bachchan family
- Marcus de la Poer Beresford, 7th Baron Decies, Irish solicitor, Chairman A&L Goodbody.
- Martha "Sissy" Biggers, American television personality
- Alfonso de Orléans-Borbón, Duke of Galliera, Spanish racing driver, founder of Racing Engineering
- Eric J. Boswell, United States Assistant Secretary of State for Diplomatic Security and Director of the Office of Foreign Missions
- Enrico Marone Cinzano, Italian artist and furniture designer
- Sir Coles John Jeremy Child (1944–2022), British actor
- Alastair Crooke CMG, British diplomat, founder and director of the Conflicts Forum
- Andrés Duany, American architect and author
- Annabel Fay, New Zealand pop singer, daughter of Sir Michael Fay
- Roger C. Field, British inventor; inventor of the Foldaxe folding electric guitar.
- Ben Freeth, MBE, Zimbabwean farmer and human rights activist.
- Michel Gill, American actor
- Faris Glubb (1939–2004), British-Jordanian journalist and political activist
- Sheherazade Goldsmith, British journalist, environmentalist and jeweller
- Barry Golson, American author, former editor TV Guide and Playboy
- François Grosjean, French psycho-linguist, academic and author
- Patricia Gucci, British businesswoman and author, daughter of Aldo Gucci
- Laura Harring, Countess von Bismarck-Schönhausen, Mexican-American actress, first Hispanic woman to be crowned Miss USA
- Anthony Hickox, British film director, producer and screenwriter
- Sir David Hoare, 9th Baronet, British banker (Hoares)
- Ken Howard (1939–2024), English songwriter, lyricist, director and philanthropist. Co-founder Sophisticated Games.
- Bruce P. Jackson, American political strategist, founder and president of the Project on Transitional Democracies.
- Geoffrey James, Canadian photographer and journalist
- Terence Kearley, 3rd Viscount Devonport, British architect
- Shaygan Kheradpir, American technology executive, former CTO of Verizon, former CEO of Juniper Networks
- Simon Kidston, British classic car dealer, commentator and car collector
- Karl Kirchwey, American poet
- Bill Koch, American Olympian (silver medal, cross-country skiing, 1976)
- Allen Kurzweil, American novelist, journalist and editor
- Leka, Crown Prince of Albania (1939–2011)
- Andrew Leslie, CMM MSC MSM CD, Canadian Member of Parliament, Canadian Forces Lieutenant-General, Chief of the Land Staff (Ret)
- Lukas Lundin, Canadian businessman, Chairman Lundin Mining, Denison Mines, Lucara Diamond, NGEx Resources, Lundin Gold etc.
- Richard Marcus, American actor
- Alan Merrill (1951–2020), American composer and recording artist
- Henry Milles-Lade, 5th Earl Sondes (1940–1996), British businessman (agriculture), Chairman Gillingham FC
- Hamid Moghadam, American philanthropist and businessman, chairman and CEO Prologis
- Megan Moulton-Levy, Jamaican-American professional tennis player
- Princess Marsi Paribatra of Thailand (1931–2013), artist, art historian and author
- Brendan Parsons, 7th Earl of Rosse, Irish diplomat (United Nations), owner Birr Castle, sponsor of the Irish Manuscripts Commission
- Cecilia Peck, American film producer, director, actress
- Edoardo Ponti, Italian director/writer
- Roger Sanders, British-American radiologist and author, pioneer of ultrasound technology
- Susan Schwab, American politician
- Rohan Sippy, Indian film producer and director
- Paul Stewart, Scottish racing driver
- Princess Tatiana of Greece and Denmark
- James Thackara, British-American novelist
- Mike Weatherley (1957-2021), British politician
- Dean Young, American cartoonist (Blondie)
