= Anavryta Experimental Lyceum =

School in Athens, Greece

- Greek: Πρότυπο Λύκειο Αναβρύτων

Information
- Other names: Anavryta Model Gymnasium; (Greek: Πρότυπο Γυμνάσιο Αναβρύτων)
- Established: 1940; 86 years ago

The Anavryta Model Lyceum (Greek: Πρότυπο Λύκειο Αναβρύτων), colloquially referred to simply as Anavryta, is a model, co-educational, public lyceum (students aged 16–18), located in the northern suburb of Maroussi in Athens, Greece. The same complex houses the Anavryta Model Gymnasium (Greek: Πρότυπο Γυμνάσιο Αναβρύτων; students aged 13–15) as well. It was established in 1940, shortly before the beginning of the World War II, as the Anavryta Classical Lyceum.

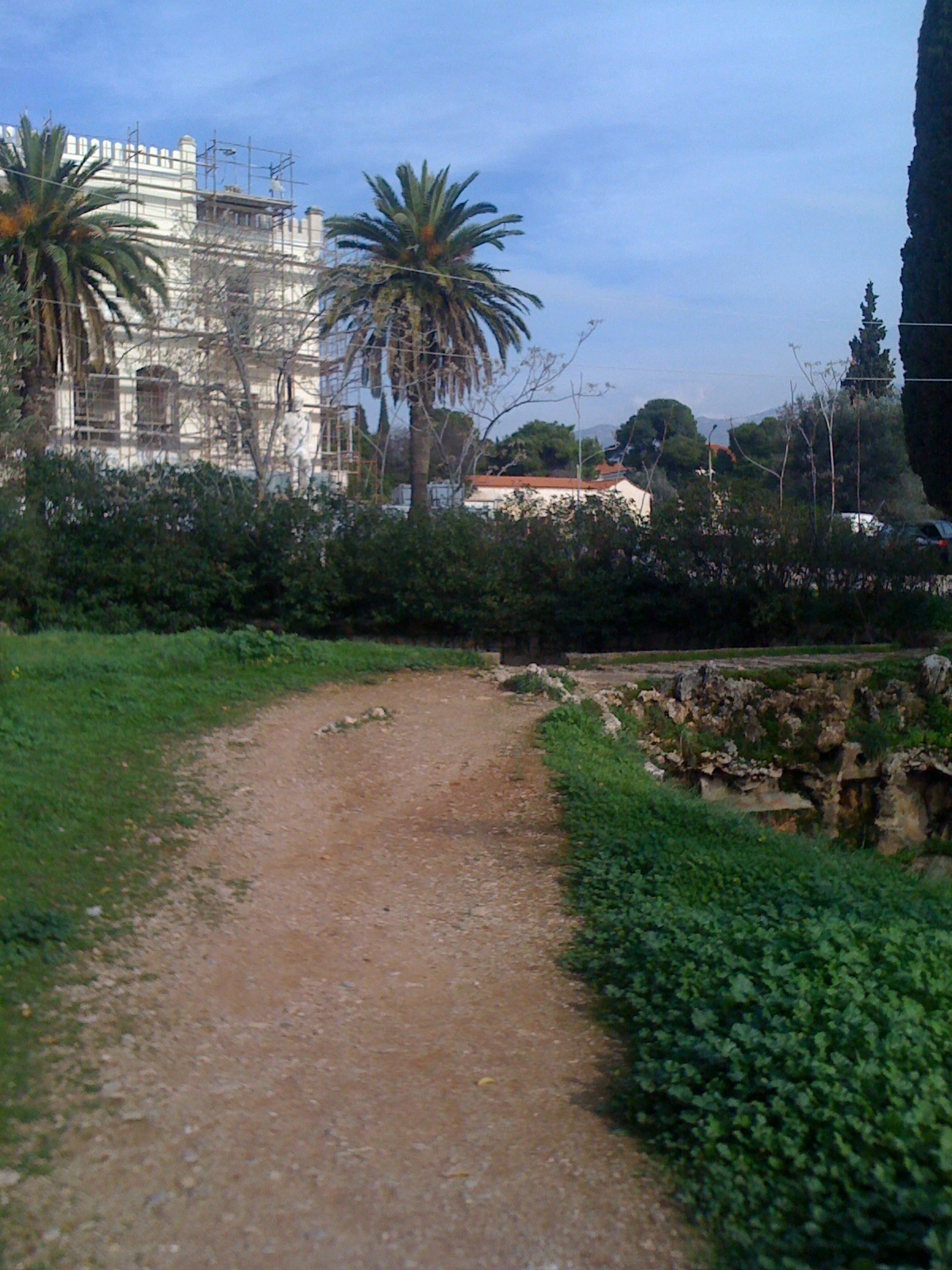
Syngros' Mansion is very close to the school (which would be just behind the building in the centre of the picture)

== History ==
The former Anavryta Classical Lyceum was an elite Greek lyceum (originally a boys-only boarding school) that was established in 1940, shortly before Greece's entry into World War II, in order to provide education to the members of the Greek royal family and notable Athenian families. It was reestablished after the war in 1949 by King Paul of Greece, his wife Queen Frederica and Jocelin Winthrop Young, who became the school's first headmaster and personal tutor to the royal couples' son Crown Prince Constantine who was amongst the school's first pupils. In 1957, Grand Duchess Elena Vladimirovna of Russia, widow of Prince Nicholas of Greece and Denmark, died in Greece, having bequeathed her personal library to the Anavryta Lyceum.

In 1971, the school was named a Lykeion Aristouhon which only admitted students who had distinguished themselves in other schools. After several educational reforms in Greece, the school lost its elitist character in 1976, but continued to have higher admissions standards until the end of the 1980s.

The Anavryta Classical Lyceum was originally based on the educational principles of Kurt Hahn, and modelled on Hahn’s own creations: the Schule Schloss Salem and Gordonstoun. The effort to create an elite high school in Athens inspired by Hahn’s principles had originated from King George II of Greece following the tradition of the Greek royal family attending Hahn schools. The effort was supported by the Greek academic society mainly because of the strong relationship of Hahn’s theories with ancient Greek philosophy. The main goal of the lyceum was to focus on the pursuit of the Hahnian ideals and the study of Greek classics.

The fate of the lyceum was closely tied with the Greek royal family, but the only king of Greece who actually graduated from the lyceum was Constantine II, in the class of 1958. The abolition of the monarchy in 1974, following a seven-year military junta, removed that association.

Under circumstances that followed in the next years and especially in the 1980s it was increasingly difficult for a public school to maintain an elitist approach in Greece. Anavryta lost its exclusive character, but remained a school with a solid reputation for academic excellence. Eventually at the end of 1991-1992 the school was prohibited from setting absolutely any kind of admission standards and requirements. Thus the lyceum completely lost its original characteristics.

The Anavryta experiment ended mainly because of the hostility that the democratic Greek governments have shown to what was considered to be the reminder of the previous regime and the complete transformation of Greek society in the decades that followed. Nevertheless, the importance of the lyceum and its educational role cannot be underestimated. The impressive alumni of the Classical lyceum shows distinguished members since generations of spiritual leaders, academics, spokesmen, businessmen, and other prominent members of the Greek society had graduated from the Classical lyceum in the decades following 1940.

The Anavryta experiment did not end, however, because the merit-based approach was restored in 2013, when the Greek Government made it mandatory for students to pass written examinations. The students who performed best in this exam were selected to attend the school. The first examination in 2013 had nearly 250 students competing for a place.

== Buildings and facilities ==
The complex is located in the Syngros forest. The building of the lyceum, though old, has a computers classroom, a Physics laboratory, a Chemistry and Biology laboratory, and a theatre. Outside the lyceum stands the billionaire Andreas Syngros' mansion (which is currently under repair), a theatre, the gymnasium, and many courts, used by both the gymnasium and the lyceum. The lyceum students have expressed their disapproval of the building, as it is old and needs repairing. In 2001-02 the gymnasium was repaired and this year (2008–09) the Sygros mansion is being repaired, something that implies that the lyceum is to be repaired too.

== Students ==
The complex (the lyceum and the gymnasium put-together) has a number of 630 students approximately. The school now gets 3/4 of its students from graduates of the gymnasium, and the other 1/4 is selected with written examinations before the beginning of the school year. The school belongs to a group of schools, in which the Ministry of National Education chooses the teachers according to special standards, such as Doctorates, long-term experience in teaching and published papers or books.

== Lessons ==
Most of the subjects are taught in Greek. There are some differences that the school has from other public lyceums in Greece. Students are free to choose from a variety of programmes ("subject groups of interest"), most of which carry out an excursion to another E.U. country. Students from abroad also visit the school. English is taught in levels ranging from 3 to 4, 4 being CPE level and 3 being CAE level.
