= Stiftung Louisenlund =

Private day and boarding school in Schleswig-Holstein, Germany

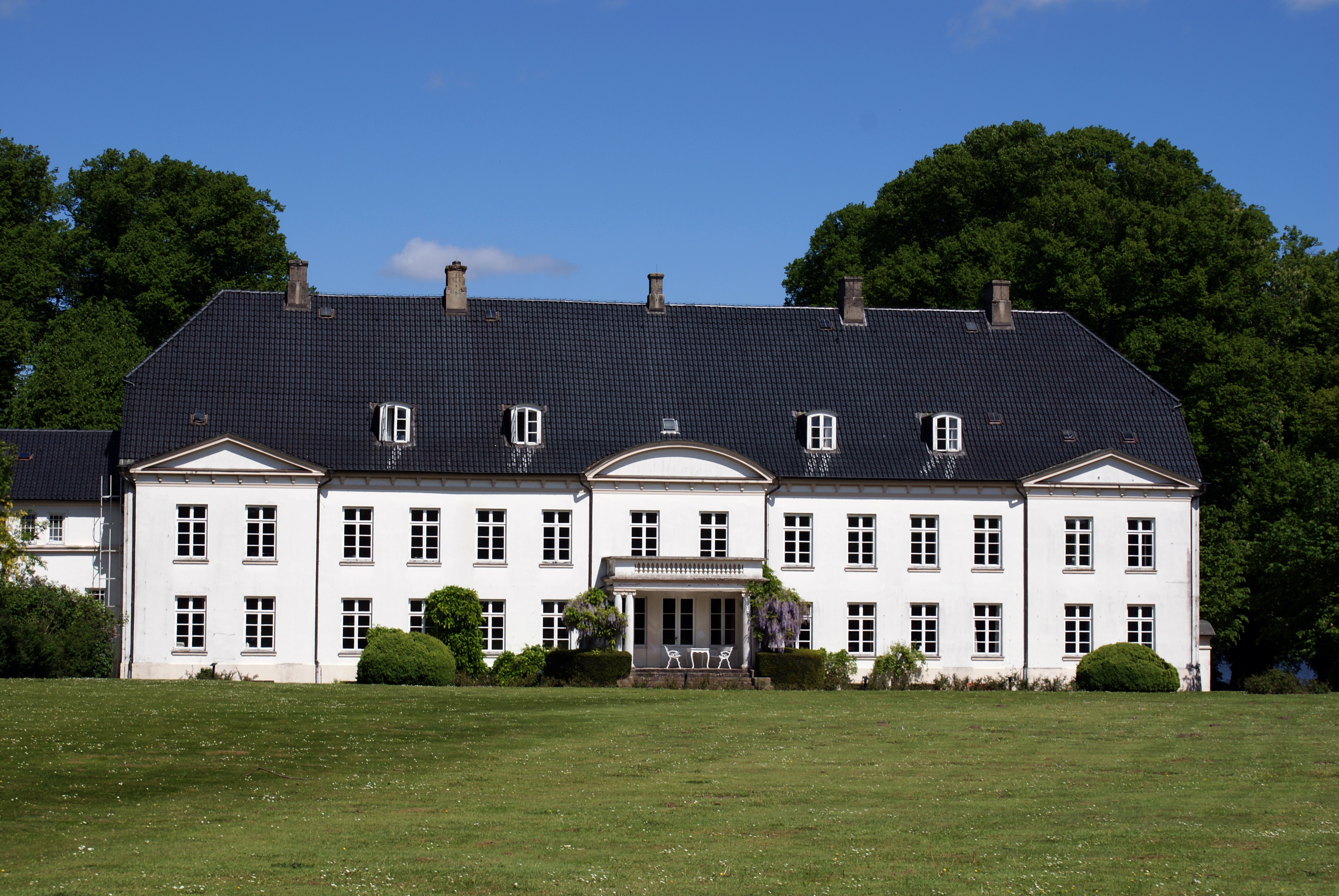
- Louisenlund manor

Location
- Güby, Schleswig-Holstein; Germany; 54°29′35″N 9°41′06″E

Information
- Type: Private day and boarding school
- Established: 1 March 1949
- Head teacher: Peter Rösner
- Staff: c. 220
- Enrollment: c. 540
- Campus size: 246 hectares (37 buildings)
- Affiliations: IB World School, Round Square
- Website: louisenlund.de

Stiftung Louisenlund is a private school for boys and girls in Güby, Schleswig-Holstein, Germany. In addition to the German Abitur, the school offers the International Baccalaureate Middle Years and Diploma Programmes.

== History ==
The school's main building is in Louisenlund Palace, which was built by Hermann von Motz between 1772 and 1776 for Prince Charles of Hesse-Kassel as a gift for his wife, Princess Louise of Denmark, the daughter of King Frederick V of Denmark. In 1790, Charles, an active Freemason, had a "Freemasons' Tower" built in the palace grounds, where meetings were held and alchemical experiments were said to have been conducted by, among others, the Count of Saint Germain.

Louisenlund later became part of the property owned by the dukes of Schleswig-Holstein-Sonderburg-Glücksburg, who remodeled the castle to its present state. An English traveler, Horace Marryat, wrote in 1860, "Louisenlund is a charming residence in summer time, with its dark beech woods, in spring a carpet of lilies, herb-paris, hepaticas; and the bright blue waters of its deep fiordes, waters which could reveal sad tales".

Advised by Kurt Hahn, in 1949 Wilhelm Friedrich, Duke of Schleswig-Holstein decided to build a boarding school on the grounds and established the Louisenlund Foundation. A foundation set up to administer the Stiftung Louisenlund, a member of the Round Square Conference of Schools. The present chairwoman is Wilhelm Friedrich's granddaughter, Ingeborg, Princess of Schleswig-Holstein-Sonderburg-Glücksburg (born 1956). In 2024, the Foundation helped establish a sister school in Rwanda, the Ntare Louisenlund School, at the invitation of the Rwandan government. Operating as an International Baccalaureate (IB) World School with a strong focus on STEM, the co-educational boarding school admits a majority of its students on merit-based government scholarships, awarded for top results in the Rwandan national examinations at the end of primary school.
