= Athenian School =

Private secondary school in Danville, California

Coordinates: 37.8354°N 121.9498°W

- 2100 Mount Diablo Scenic Blvd. Danville, California; United States

Information
- Type: Private, college-preparatory, independent, day, and boarding
- Established: 1965
- Head of school: Jay Roberts
- Grades: 6-12
- Enrollment: 528
- Nickname: Owls
- Website: www.athenian.org

The Athenian School is a co-educational, college preparatory boarding and day school located in Danville, California. Students in grades 6-12 attend classes on a 75-acre campus in Contra Costa County. The school was founded by Dyke Brown in 1965.

As of 2026, the school has an enrollment of 527 students in the middle and high school. Approximately 60 students and 18 teachers live on campus full-time. The student to teacher ratio is 8:1 and the average class size is 15. According to Niche, Athenian is ranked 147th on the 2020 list of Best Private High Schools in America and the number one school in Contra Costa County. Athenian is also ranked as the 40th best boarding school in the United States.

Athenian holds an average SAT score of 1430 (out of 1600) and an average ACT score of 33.

In 2024, 137 students took AP Exams, 70% students scoring 4 or 5, 94% students scoring 3 and above.

== History ==
Dyke Brown founded the school following his tenure as Vice President of the Ford Foundation. His work in youth development and his children's education influenced the school's developmental.

Athenian is a founding member of Round Square, an international organization of schools whose philosophy is influenced by the German educator Kurt Hahn. As of 2021, there are approximately 200 Round Square member schools worldwide.

In 1962, Brown left the Ford Foundation to begin to raise money for the school he had in mind. Inspired by the Oxford system of individual colleges sharing common resources, his original plan was a series of four campuses sharing a library, science classrooms, athletic facilities, a performing-arts complex, and other facilities. He found 80+ acres of land in what was then rural Contra Costa county, a portion of what was then the Blackhawk Ranch, bordering on Mount Diablo State Park.

Construction began in 1963, and the founding head, W. Robert Usellis, began recruiting the pioneer classes in the fall of 1964. Brown's vision was startling at the time: he planned for both integration and coeducation. During the 1960s, the school was among a minority of private institutions to practice coeducation and racial integration. The school collaborated with programs such as A Better Chance to recruit a diverse student body. The norm for boarding schools at the time was single-sex; a coeducational boarding program was unusual. In September 1965, the school opened with approximately sixty students, in ninth and tenth grades. In 1968, the founding class graduated, with a full enrollment of about 120 students, of whom only about six were day students.

In the 1970s, Athenian weathered local, national, and international changes. The surrounding area was transformed from cattle ranches to upscale developments. Athenian's neighbor, Blackhawk Ranch, was sold to land developer Ken Behring, and by 1979 2,500 upscale homes were built. The population boom in the area meant that there was an increased demand for day student places at the school.

Nationally, at least two forces were at work. First, the stagflation of the 1970s meant that parents had less discretionary income, thus weakening the pool of prospective boarding students. Other demographic changes, such as the increase in divorce, affected the pool of prospective boarding students.

In 1979, there was sufficient interest in the surrounding community for Athenian to open a day-school-only middle school, serving students in grades 6–8. Most of them continued on to finish high school at Athenian.

== Athletics ==
Athenian is one of ten schools in the Bay Counties League - East. The school colors are navy, white, and orange; the sports teams wear orange and black. The full list of sports offered includes wrestling, soccer, volleyball, tennis, dance, golf, swimming, track & field, cross country, basketball, baseball, badminton, women's lacrosse and a variety of other non-team athletics, including hiking, ultimate frisbee, fencing, yoga, outdoor adventure, and weight training. In 2024, Athenian boys basketball team won its first CIF State championship.

== Athenian Wilderness Experience (AWE) ==
Athenian students in their junior year spend twenty six days backpacking in either the Sierra Nevada during the summer, or Death Valley during the spring semester. The course is designed to promote personal growth, develop a sense of community, and foster environmental stewardship amongst Athenian students.

On the homecoming day, AWE participants take part in a tradition known as "Run In", during which students run from a location that is 8 miles away from the school back to the campus.

== March Term ==
March Term courses are two-week immersive experiences. These typically include international and domestic travel focused on service work, cultural immersion, and independent inquiry in fields such as environmental conservation, social justice, and history.
