= Abbotsholme School =

Location
- Rocester, Derbyshire, ST14 5BS; England; 52°56′40″N 1°49′32″W

Information
- Type: Private day and boarding school
- Motto: Glad Day Love and Duty
- Religious affiliation: Christian
- Established: 1889
- Founder: Cecil Reddie
- Department for Education URN: 113003 Tables
- Principal: Charlotte Molloy
- Gender: Coeducational
- Age: 2 to 18
- Enrolment: 290~
- Houses: Wainwright Palmer
- Colour: Light Blue. Navy.
- Alumni: Old Abbotsholmians
- Website: http://www.abbotsholme.co.uk/

Abbotsholme School is a co-educational private boarding and day school. It was announced in June 2026 that the school would be closing on 22 June 2026 following the acquisition by Syd Phillimore of neighbouring Eaton Hall Shooting Range and Jamie Buchanan. School children and Parents were informed the school would close before the end of term and that £750,000 of deposits would not be returned. The school is situated on a 140-acre campus on the banks of the River Dove in Derbyshire, England near the county border and the village of Rocester in Staffordshire. It is a member of the Society of Heads (formerly Society of Headmasters & Headmistresses of Independent Schools) and is a founding member of the Round Square conference of schools.

== History ==
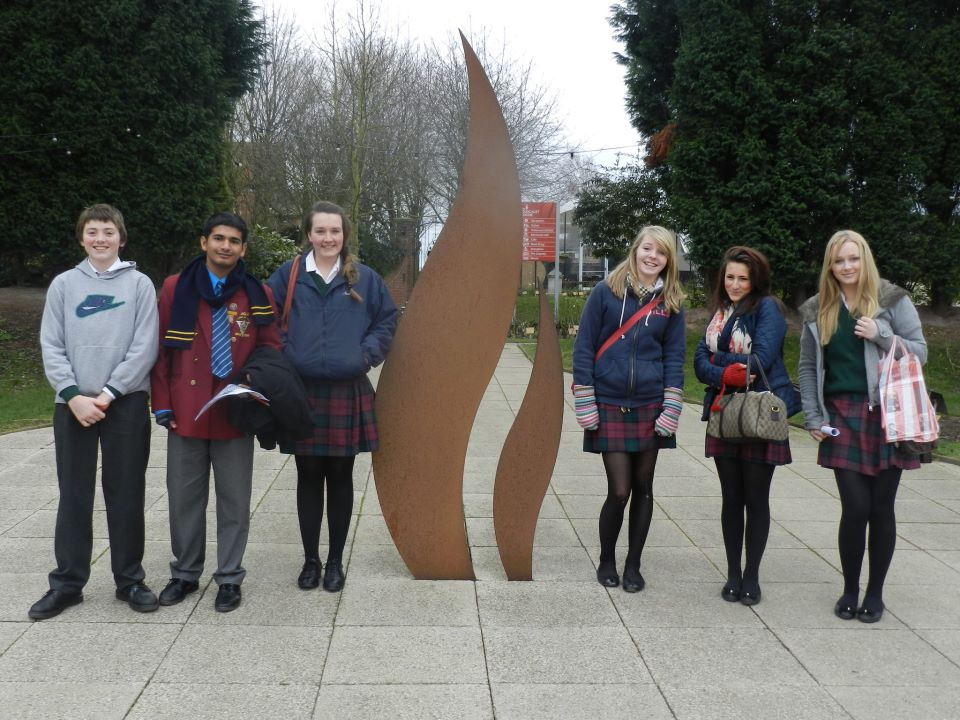
Exchange student and classmates at Abbotsholme School in 2012

Abbotsholme was founded by the Scottish academic and educationalist Cecil Reddie as an experiment in his progressive educational philosophies and theories. The school, then known "The New School", opened in 1889 to boys aged 10 to 19. From the very beginning, it departed from the structure of the traditional public school in favour of a less rigid environment and more liberal education. "Eton collars" were discarded in favour of a more comfortable and practical uniform, and English, French and German were taught in place of Classics (Latin and Greek). The fine arts were introduced as core subjects, considered unusual at that time, since music was mostly taught at cathedral schools and art at specialist art institutes. Practical skills such as animal husbandry and carpentry were integrated into the curriculum.

In 2017 the school was bought by the Chinese company Achieve Education Ltd, owned by Tong Zhou, who sits on the Achieve Advisory Board. The directors of the school are now those of Achieve Education and are chaired by Mike Farmer, a former head of Kilgraston School.

== Abbotsholme Arts Society ==
Gordon Clark, director of music at the school from the 1950s, founded the Abbotsholme Arts Society in 1968. The first concert, on 24 September, featured oboist Léon Goossens and the organisers have continued to book front-rank professionals and promising newcomers in classical music and jazz - including Alfred Brendel, Paul Tortelier, Yehudi Menuhin, John Dankworth and Cleo Laine, Evelyn Glennie and Vladimir Ashkenazy. Along with concerts there are also films, lectures and visual arts events.

Performances are mostly held in the school's chapel, though some are held at outside venues. Clark pioneered the idea of subscription concerts. Since 1968 there have been over 1,000 concerts: 2022-23 was the 55th season. Clark also founded the Lichfield Festival in 1981. He retired from teaching in 1984, and died suddenly in New York in August 1989, after which the Gordon Clark Memorial Trust Fund was established. Subsequent artistic directors of the Arts Society were Paul Spicer, Meurig Bowen (from 2001), Richard Hawley (previously orchestral manager of the City of Birmingham Symphony Orchestra) and Neil Millensted.

== Notable alumni ==
- Roger Altounyan, physician and pharmacologist who pioneered the use of sodium cromoglycate as a preventative for asthma
- Samuel Phillips Bedson, Professor of Bacteriology, University of London
- Alan Dower Blumlein, Electronics engineer and inventor
- Peter Crossley-Holland, Ethnomusicologist and composer
- Robin Gandy, Mathematician
- Edward James Martin Koppel, British-born American broadcast journalist
- Mervyn Jones, novelist, journalist and biographer
- Alfred Angas Scott (1875-1923), motorcycle designer, inventor and founder of The Scott Motorcycle Company
- Ian Shapiro, political scientist
- Olaf Stapledon (1886-1950), novelist and philosopher; author of Last and First Men, Star Maker, and other works of speculative fiction.
- Lytton Strachey, British writer and critic
- Alan Muir Wood, Civil engineer
- Peter Gautrey, British soldier and diplomat
