= Kurt Hahn =

German educator (1886–1974)

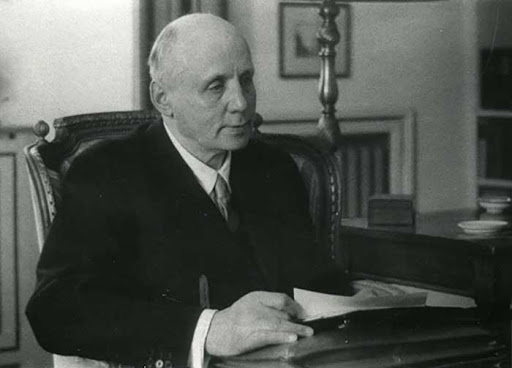
- Born: Kurt Matthias Robert Martin Hahn; 5 June 1886; Berlin, Germany
- Died: 14 December 1974 (aged 88); Heiligenberg, West Germany
- Education: Oxford University, Heidelberg University, Freiburg University, Göttingen University
- Occupation: Educator
- Notable work: Stiftung Louisenlund, Schule Schloss Salem, Gordonstoun, Outward Bound, Duke of Edinburgh's Award, Atlantic College and the United World Colleges
- Awards: Order of the British Empire

Kurt Matthias Robert Martin Hahn (5 June 1886 – 14 December 1974) was a German educator. He was decisive in founding Stiftung Louisenlund, Schule Schloss Salem, Gordonstoun, Outward Bound, the Duke of Edinburgh's Award, and the first of the United World Colleges, Atlantic College.

== Life ==
=== Early life ===
Kurt Matthias Robert Martin Hahn was born on 5 June 1886 in Berlin to Jewish parents. He attended school in the city, then universities at Oxford, Heidelberg, Freiburg and Göttingen.

During World War I, Hahn worked in the German Department for Foreign Affairs, analyzing British newspapers and advising the German Foreign Office. He had been private secretary to Prince Max von Baden, the last Imperial Chancellor of Germany, and in 1919 was part of the German delegation to the Paris Peace Conference, where, as secretary and speechwriter for the German minister of Foreign Affairs, Graf Brockdorff-Rantzau, he witnessed the creation of the Treaty of Versailles.

In 1920 Hahn and Prince Max founded Schule Schloss Salem, a private boarding school in Baden-Württemberg in south-western Germany, where Hahn served as headmaster until 1933 and Adolf Hitler's rise to power. Hahn was raised Jewish, and began his fierce criticism of the Nazi regime after the Potempa murder of 1932, when Stormtroopers attacked and killed a young communist in the presence of his mother. The Stormtroopers were originally sentenced to death, but when they were given amnesty and celebrated by the Nazis, Hahn spoke out against Hitler publicly. He asked the students, faculty, and alumni of the Salem school to "choose between Salem and Hitler". As a result, he was imprisoned for five days, from 11 to 16 March 1933.

After an appeal by the British Prime Minister, Ramsay MacDonald, Hahn was released and in July 1933 he was forced to leave Germany and moved to the United Kingdom.

=== United Kingdom ===
Hahn settled in Scotland, where he founded Gordonstoun on similar principles to the school in Salem. Later Hahn converted to Christianity, became a communicant member of the Church of England in 1945, and preached in the Church of Scotland.

Hahn was also involved in the foundation of the Outward Bound organisation with Lawrence Holt, Atlantic College in Wales and the wider United World College movement, and the Duke of Edinburgh's Award. An international organisation of schools aligned with Hahn's educational philosophy was initially to be called The Hahn Schools but is today known as Round Square.

=== Return to Germany ===
After World War II, Hahn divided his time between Britain and Germany. He founded or inspired the founding of several new boarding schools based on the principles of Salem and Gordonstoun: Anavryta, Greece (1949); Louisenlund, Germany (1949); Battisborough, England (1955); Rannoch School, Scotland (1959); Box Hill School, England (1959); International School Ibadan, Nigeria (1963); and The Athenian School, USA (1965).

He resigned from the headship of Gordonstoun on health grounds and returned to Hermannsberg (Heiligenberg), near Salem in 1953. He died there on 14 December 1974, aged 88 and was buried in Salem's Stefansfeld cemetery.

== Philosophy ==
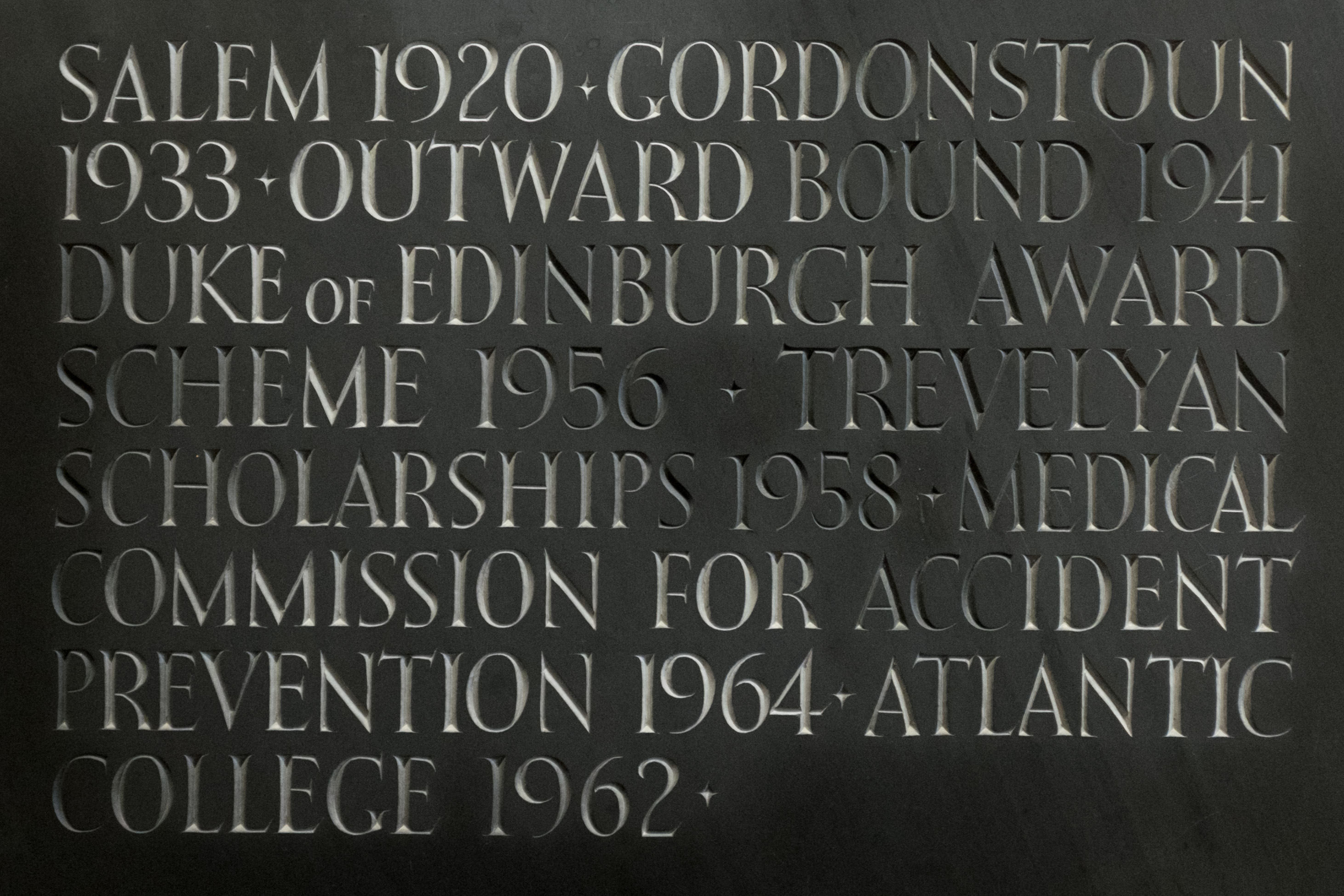
Initiatives Kurt Hahn was "decisive in founding", listed on a commemorative plaque at Atlantic College, Wales

Hahn's educational philosophy was based on respect for adolescents, whom he believed to possess an innate decency and moral sense, but who were, he believed, corrupted by society as they aged. He believed that education could prevent this corruption, if students were given opportunities for personal leadership and to see the results of their own actions. This is one reason for the focus on outdoor adventure in his philosophy. Hahn relied here on Bernhard Zimmermann, the former Director of the Göttingen University Physical Education Department, who had to leave Germany in 1938 as he did not want to divorce his Jewish wife.

Hahn's educational thinking was crystallised by World War I, which he viewed as proof of the corruption of society and a promise of later doom if people, Europeans particularly, could not be taught differently. At the Schule Schloss Salem, in addition to acting as headmaster, he taught history, politics, ancient Greek, Shakespeare, and Schiller. He was deeply influenced by Plato's thought. Gordonstoun is based less on Eton than on Salem. Hahn's prefects are called colour bearers, and traditionally they are promoted according to Hahn's values: concern and compassion for others, the willingness to accept responsibility, and concern and tenacity in pursuit of the truth. Punishment of any kind is viewed as a last resort. According to the German educational Michael Knoll, "education for democracy" was at the core of Hahn's educational philosophy.

Hahn also emphasised what he called "Samaritan service", having students give service to others. He formulated this as focusing on finding Christian purpose in life. His former pupil, Golo Mann, later described him as a "Christian gentleman." Hahn's ideas were also adopted – through the efforts of Alec Peterson, who previously worked under Hahn at the newly founded Atlantic College in the 1960s – by the International Baccalaureate program and thus secularised.

== Six Declines of Modern Youth ==
During his lifetime, Hahn summarised his beliefs about the younger generation at the time into six key points, describing them as the Six Declines of Modern Youth:

1. Decline of Fitness due to modern methods of locomotion;
2. Decline of Initiative and Enterprise due to the widespread disease of spectatoritis (i.e. "excessive indulgence in forms of amusement in which one is a passive spectator rather than an active participant");
3. Decline of Memory and Imagination due to the confused restlessness of modern life;
4. Decline of Skill and Care due to the weakened tradition of craftsmanship;
5. Decline of Self-discipline due to the ever-present availability of stimulants and tranquillisers;
6. Decline of Compassion due to the unseemly haste with which modern life is conducted or, as William Temple called it, "spiritual death".

Hahn also proposed four solutions to these problems, all of which manifested themselves in a variety of ways at Salem, Gordonstoun, Atlantic College, and with Outward Bound:

1. Fitness Training (e.g., to compete with oneself in physical fitness; in so doing, train the discipline and determination of the mind through the body);
2. Expeditions (e.g., via sea or land, to engage in long, challenging endurance tasks);
3. Projects (e.g., involving crafts and manual skills);
4. Rescue Service (e.g., surf lifesaving, fire fighting, first aid).

== The Seven Laws of Salem ==
Hahn applied these seven laws to Salem School, Gordonstoun School, community programs for building physical fitness and social spirit, the worldwide Outward Bound movement and Atlantic College.

1. Give the children opportunities for self-discovery.
  Every boy and girl has grande passion, often hidden and unrealised to the end of life. The educator cannot hope and may not try to find it out by psychoanalytical methods. It can and will be revealed by the child coming into close touch with a number of different activities. When a child has come "into his own," you will often hear a shout of joy, or be thrilled by some other manifestation of primitive happiness.
2. Make the children meet with triumph and defeat.
  It is possible to wait on a child's inclinations and gifts and to arrange carefully for an unbroken series of successes. You may make him happy in this way – I doubt it – but you certainly disqualify him for the battle of life. Salem believes you ought to discover the child's weakness as well as his strength. Allow him to engage in enterprises in which he is likely to fail, and do not hush up his failure. Teach him to overcome defeat.
3. Give the children the opportunity of self-effacement in the common cause.
  Even the youngsters ought to undertake tasks which are of definite importance for the community. Tell them from the start: "You are a crew, not passengers. Let the responsible boys and girls shoulder duties big enough, when negligently performed, to wreck the State."
4. Provide periods of silence.
  Follow the great precedent of the Quakers. Unless the present-day generation acquires early habits of quiet and reflection, it will be speedily and prematurely used up by the nerve-exhausting and distracting civilisation of today.
5. Train the imagination.
  You must call it into action, otherwise it becomes atrophied like a muscle not in use. The power to resist the pressing stimulus of the hour and the moment cannot be acquired in later life; it often depends on the ability to visualise what you plan and hope and fear for the future. Self-indulgence is in many cases due to lack of vision.
6. Make games (i.e., competition) important but not predominant.
  Athletics do not suffer by being put in their place. In fact you restore the dignity of the usurper by dethroning him.
7. Free the sons of the wealthy and powerful from the enervating sense of privilege.
  Let them share the experiences of an enthralling school life with sons and daughters of those who have to struggle for their existence. No school can build up a tradition of self-discipline and vigorous but joyous endeavour unless at least 30 percent of the children come from homes where life is not only simple but even hard.

== Personality ==
In 1934, through his lectures in London to the New Education Fellowship, Hahn met the educationalist T. C. Worsley and persuaded him to spend a summer term at the newly founded Gordonstoun in the capacity of consultant. In his memoir Flannelled Fool: A Slice of a Life in the Thirties, Worsley records his impressions of Hahn's penetrating character analysis, and his energy and commitment in the cause of human development, but as time went on he became critical of Hahn's "despotic, overpowering personality":

He revealed himself as having a fierce temper, a strong hand with the cane, and a temperament which hated being crossed. Especially damaging to my very English view, was his dislike of being defeated at any game. Hahn was an avid tennis player. But was it an easily forgiveable weakness that his opponents had to be chosen for being his inferiors or else, if their form was unknown, instructed not to let themselves win?

Hahn's behaviour came to seem to Worsley "so ineffably, so Germanically silly" that he was unable to share the clear adulation of the teaching staff:

We were going through the classrooms when, in one, he suddenly stopped, gripped my arm, raised his nostrils in the air, and then, in his marked German accent, he solemnly pronounced:

'Somevon has been talking dirt in this room. I can smell it.'

Hahn's views on Shakespeare led to an open disagreement:

He had what I have since learned to be a common German belief that Shakespeare was better in German than in English. I refused to allow this. I argued that the German translation might indeed be very good, but that the English original must be better. No, he assured me, the German was better; and as I didn't know German and he did know English, he must be right. We grew absurdly heated.

== Expeditionary Learning Schools ==
A further iteration of Hahn's ideas led to the formation of Expeditionary learning schools, which launched in 1993 with 10 demonstration schools in five US cities. In the fall of 2007, The Kurt Hahn Expeditionary Learning School opened in Brooklyn, New York.

== In popular culture ==
In the television series The Crown, Hahn is played by German actor Burghart Klaußner.
