= Peace One Day =

Nonprofit organization

- Founded: September 1999; 27 years ago
- Type: NGO, NPO
- Purpose: World Peace Day
- Location: United Kingdom
- Key people: Jeremy Gilley (founder)
- Website: peaceoneday.org

Peace One Day is a non-profit organisation whose objective is to institutionalise the International Day of Peace. It was founded in 1999 by British documentary filmmaker and actor Jeremy Gilley.

== History ==
In 1999, Jeremy Gilley desired there should be one single day when all countries vowed not to wage war: a worldwide ceasefire and day of non-violence. He established Peace One Day. The United Nations had already declared the third Tuesday of September the International Day of Peace, Peace One Day aimed to resolve the confusion on which calendar day it fell, and on 7 September 2001, the United Nations General Assembly unanimously adopted a resolution formally establishing the UN International Day of Peace an annual Peace Day of global ceasefire and non-violence on 21 September.

The former UK ambassador to the United Nations, Jeremy Greenstock, credited Peace One Day's campaign with playing a central role in the new resolutions processes and commented that "the need for such an enhanced approach was originally brought to our attention by a United Kingdom-based non-governmental organisation, Peace One Day".

== Campaigns ==
=== Peace Day in Afghanistan ===
In 2007, Jeremy Gilley and Peace One Day Ambassador Jude Law travelled to Jalalabad and Kabul to meet with representatives from the United Nations, the Afghan government, and other organisations. They initiated a campaign alongside WHO, UNICEF, and the Ministry of Public Health, which resulted in providing 1.4 million children with the monovalent P3 polio vaccine in southern Afghanistan and selected areas in eastern Afghanistan.

In 2008 there was a 70 per cent drop in violent incidents on Peace Day in Afghanistan following pledges by President Hamid Karzai and UN forces for a day of non-violence, and by 2010 the campaign had resulted in the immunisation against polio of 4.5 million children in areas hitherto unreachable due to conflict.

=== One Day One Goal ===
In 2008, Peace One Day launched the One Day One Goal initiative – aiming to host football matches in all member states of the United Nations on the International Day of Peace. The campaign quickly garnered attention, gaining support from figures such as David Beckham, Gary Lineker, and Victor Wanyama.

The success of their One Day One Goal prompted similar campaigns, such as Try for Peace – supported by figures such as Sir Clive Woodward and Maggie Alphonsi.

=== Try For Peace ===
Peace One Day launched a campaign that saw thousands of people playing all different forms of rugby in countries across the globe in the spirit of peace and reconciliation on 21 September. Supporters included Sir Clive Woodward (2003 Rugby World Cup winning Head Coach and 2012 Team GB Director of Sport) and Maggie Alphonsi (former flanker for Saracens W.R.F.C. and England). Highlights of the campaign included matches in Uganda, Kenya and Rwanda.

=== Set For Peace ===
This campaign saw DJs such as Idris Elba, Paul van Dyk, David Morales, Capital FM's Andi Durrant and thousands of others around the world play sets for peace to bring people together on 21 September. Notable Set for Peace events took place in the DRC, Japan, Spain and The Maldives.

=== One Day One Dance ===
One Day One Dance has seen thousands of people all over the world dancing on or around Peace Day, 21 September. From flash mobs in Lithuania and Cayman Islands, to school performances in Russia and Kenya, amateurs and professionals came together to stand for peace, with hundreds of dances taking place every year around world in the name of peace. The campaign encompasses all forms of dance at every level and has seen activation by organisations as diverse as Hong Kong Ballet and Zumba.

=== Coca-Cola ===
In 2009, Coca-Cola for the first time in its history launched a special-edition charity can on behalf of the non-profit organisation, Peace One Day.

=== Adidas & Puma ===
In 2009, Peace One Day led an initiative that brought together Adidas and Puma for the first time in decades on Peace Day 21 September. The sportswear companies symbolically ended their feud with a handshake and a football match on the day.

=== Peace Day Burger ===
For Peace Day 2012, Peace One Day coordinated action between Burger King, Denny's, Wayback, Krystal, Giraffas to create a single burger from five brands on Peace Day. The pop-up shop distributed 1,500 Peace Day Burgers to raise money for the Peace One Day.

=== Innocent Drinks ===
In 2012, Innocent Drinks sponsored Peace One Day's Global Truce 2012 initiative.

=== Peace Day in The Great Lakes ===
In 2013, Peace One Day launched a three-year campaign in African Great Lakes to promote the International Day of Peace, and to manifest community action. The project raised awareness of Peace Day in Rwanda, Uganda, Kenya, and the Democratic Republic of the Congo.

=== Make Love Not War, Unilever ===
In 2014, Unilever partnered with Peace One Day to launch the campaign "Make Love Not War" with their new product "Axe Peace".

=== Partnerships for Peace Coalition ===
In 2018, Peace One Day teamed up with Alliance for Peacebuilding to establish a network of organisations committed to peace, promoting Goal 17 of the Sustainable Development Goals.

=== Cyber Non-violence ===
In 2019, Peace One Day launched a new campaign focussed on the reduction of cyber violence, seeking to decrease online hate speech, racism, bullying and ridicule on Peace Day 21 September. The campaign utilises the hashtags #CyberNonViolence #OnlineNonViolence #PeaceDay21".

=== Make Tea Time Peace Time ===
In 2020, Peace One Day partnered with Lipton Ice Tea for the Peace One Day Live Global Digital Experience on Peace Day 21 September. Alongside the broadcast, Lipton and Peace One Day launched a campaign called 'Make Tea Time Peace Time'. To share the message, Lipton and Peace One Day took over iconic clock towers and landmarks around the world, including Australia, Malaysia, UAE, France, Belgium, Germany, the Netherlands, the UK, Mexico, Guatemala and Brazil.

Radio presenter and host Roman Kemp, supported the unveiling of the light installation at King's Cross St Pancras.

The call to action, "Tea Time. Peace Time", illuminated buildings and billboards crossing six time zones, in countdown to support Peace One Day reaching a potential audience of more than 4 billion people in just 24 hours.

=== The City of Melbourne Digital Peace Dove ===
In 2020, Peace One Day collaborated with the City of Melbourne to launch the Digital Peace Dove, a celebration of #PeaceDay 21 September and United Nations Global Goal 16 for Peace and Justice.

== Concerts ==
=== Peace Day Brixton 2003 ===
As part of their continuing plan to raise awareness of Peace Day they have arranged numerous concerts with the support of celebrities and musicians including Dave Stewart, Annie Lennox, Angelina Jolie, Joseph Fiennes, Sir Richard Branson, Nadirah X, Mudbone Cooper and the late Mo Mowlam. The first concert was held in 2002 at the Brixton Academy in London, and it was so successful that a second concert was held there again in 2003.

=== Peace Day Royal Albert Hall 2007 ===
In 2007, Peace One Day organised a third concert at the Royal Albert Hall in London, headlining Annie Lennox with Yusuf Islam, Corinne Bailey Rae, James Morrison, Kate Nash, and Marc Almond. The concert also included specially filmed pieces from Jude Law, David Beckham, and Lord David Puttnam. A second concert was held at the Royal Albert Hall in 2008, and it was broadcast in 93 countries.

=== Peace Day Le Grand Rex 2009 ===
In 2009 the Peace One Day 10th Anniversary Concert was held in Paris at Le Grand Rex, and this concert included performances by Lenny Kravitz, Kasabian, and Keziah Jones.

=== Peace Day O2 Arena 2011 ===
The 2011 concert at the O2 Arena announced a new Peace One Day initiative Global Truce 2012, Razorlight and Eliza Doolittle and also Cat Stevens headlined. On 21 June 2012 a Peace One Day concert at Derry, in the spirit of the Olympic Truce marked the start of the London 2012 Festival and was also a three-month countdown to Global Truce 2012, some of the musicians that performed were Pixie Lott, Newton Faulkner and Imelda May.

=== Peace Day "Global Truce" 2012 ===
The Peace One Day Celebration annual concert on Peace Day 21 September 2012, the day of Global Truce was held at Wembley Arena in London, with musicians Elton John, James Morrison and 2Cellos, introductions were made by Jude Law, Lily Cole and other special guests. The results of the Global Truce 2012 were announced.

=== Peace Day The Hague 2013 ===
Peace One Day brought its 2013 celebration to The Hague to mark the first hundred years of the Peace Palace. This historic concert formed part of the 24-hour Global Broadcast on Peace Day Saturday 21 September 2013. The show contained performances from renowned international artists including Paul van Dyk, Natasha Bedingfield, Carlinhos Brown, The Feeling, Miguel Bosé and Jahméne Douglas.

The 24-hour Global Broadcast included a series of interviews with some of the world's leading actors, talking about peace and the theme for Peace Day: "Who will you make peace with?" Each interview included a speech chosen and performed by the actor, relating to peace. Actors who took part included: Dominic Cooper, Eddie Izzard, Forest Whitaker, Gillian Anderson, Gael García Bernal, Michelle Rodriguez, Richard E. Grant, Michael Caine and Jude Law.

=== Peace Day Goma 2014 ===
In 2014, Peace One Day made history by taking over Goma Airport in the Democratic Republic of the Congo to hold a major concert, produced by Jude Law and Jeremy Gilley, headlined by five-time Grammy Award-nominated recording artist Akon with regional artists Lexxus Legal, Detty Darba and Sango’A, and Congolese traditional drummers and dancers. In an historic first, the airport hosted this major event that united more than 50,000 people, celebrating the hope for peace on Peace Day, 21 September.

=== Peace Day Kigali 2015 ===
In 2015, Peace One Day held a celebration in Rwanda on Peace Day 21 September, produced by Jude Law and Jeremy Gilley. On the day they were joined by the African Children's Choir, Knowless, Innoss'B, Urban Boys, KREST CREW, Jabba Junior, as well as artists who contributed to One, the #PeaceDay Anthem by Coke Studio Africa: Zwai Bala, Maurice Kirya, Ice Prince, Alikiba, Wangechi and Dama do Bling.

=== Peace Day Live Broadcast 2016 ===
On Peace Day 21 September 2016, Peace One Day hosted 17 live broadcasts on their Facebook page. Produced by Jude Law and Jeremy Gilley, and hosted by Ahmad Fawzi, including contributions from Maher Nasser and Melissa Fleming. In 2016 it is estimated that 2.2 billion people were exposed to the Peace Day message, 940 million were fully aware of the day, resulting in around 16 million behaving more peacefully (McKinsey & Co).

=== Peace Day iHeartRadio Music Festival 2018 ===
In 2018, Peace One Day teamed up with 23andMe and iHeartMedia, to raise awareness of Peace Day 21 September at the iHeartRadio Music Festival, T-Mobile Arena, Las Vegas. Performers included Mariah Carey, Carrie Underwood, Kygo, Logic, Sam Smith, 5SOS, Belly, as well as Nick Jonas, Troye Sivan, Dinah Jane and more, who lent their voices to an original Peace Day piece – written by American singer-songwriter, poet and record producer Mike Posner – urging others to make peace and put their differences aside on Peace Day.

=== Peace One Day 20 Year Celebration ===
In 2019, Jeremy Gilley and Jude Law produced the Peace One Day 20th Anniversary Celebration at the Shakespeare's Globe Theatre, London. With music from Sting, Emeli Sandé, Jack Savoretti, Basement Jaxx, Will Young and Citizens of the World Choir, and dramatic performances from Jude Law, Sir Mark Rylance and Emily Watson.

A report by Digitalis, Social 360 and Signal-AI measured the following results: Over 2.2 billion people potentially exposed to the Peace Day message in 24 hours. Users from 116 countries visited the Peace One Day website on Peace Day. #PeaceDay circulated by 19 million Twitter users at midday, representing an estimated 13% of entire active Twitter users. At its height #Peaceday was tweeted 20x per minute.

=== Peace One Day Live Global Digital Experience 2020 ===
On Peace Day 21 September 2020, Jeremy Gilley and Jude Law produced the Peace One Day Live Global Digital Experience, sponsored by Avon, Lipton and Microsoft. It was 12 hours of online broadcast, featuring speakers, actors, musicians and live action from around the world. With music from, Yusuf/Cat Stevens, Annie Lennox, Emeli Sandé, Jack Savoretti, Basement Jaxx and Jesse Royal. With readings from Jude Law, Dia Mirza, Sir Mark Rylance, Emily Watson, Bella Ramsey, Forest Whitaker and Zoe Kravitz.

A report by Digitalis, Social 360 and Signal-AI measured the following results: Media statistics show that Peace One Day received 2.1 times more coverage compared to 2019. Articles mentioning Peace One Day could have been read 9 billion times in total. This is 4.5 times higher than last year's figure. The biggest spike in coverage was during the day of the event, with 2,658 articles published worldwide. The Peace One Day website received 6,751 unique users from 141 Countries this is up from 1,300 unique users from 116 countries across the globe in 2019. Peace One Day founder was mentioned and/or quoted in 287 articles, 17.9 times more than 2019 (16 articles).

=== Anti-Racism Live Global Digital Experience, 21 March 2021, the International Day for the Elimination of Racial Discrimination ===
Peace One Day in association with the Office of the United Nations High Commissioner for Human Rights have produced the Anti-Racism Live Global Digital Experience on 21 March 2021, on the International Day for the Elimination of Racial Discrimination. Produced and Directed by Jeremy Gilley. The event featured speakers, actors, musicians and live interviews from around the world. With music from, Youssou N’dour, Mica Paris, Jack Savoretti, Zwai Bala, Emmanuel Jal, Izzy Bizu, Jesse Royal, Madame Gandhi, Popcaan. With readings from, Monique Coleman, Hakeem Kae-Kazim and Nathalie Emmanuel.

A report by Digitalis, Social 360 and Signal-AI measured the following results: The Anti-Racism Live Global Digital Experience on Twitter saw fantastic engagement with a total of 310,566 views. The International Day for the Elimination of Racial Discrimination was mentioned in 6,302 articles from 14 to 28 March 2021 – volume of coverage is 10.9 times bigger compared to the coverage received last year during the same time period. On 21 March 2021, there were 2,566 articles mentioning the International Day for the Elimination of Racial Discrimination – 2,106 of these were neutral and 460 were positive. The hashtag #FightRacismsaw the largest engagement on Twitter, appearing in 65,736 tweets followed by #Standup4humanrights (15,377 tweets) and #GlobalGoals (13,571 tweets) (data for the date range 14–28 March 2021).

=== Climate Action Live Global Digital Experience, 21 June 2021 ===
Peace One Day are producing Climate Action Live on 21 June 2021.

== Filmmaking ==
=== Domestic Violence Awareness ===
Since 2019, Peace One Day Productions have been making films for Avon, telling stories of gender-based violence survivors. These films are directed and produced by Jeremy Gilley.

== Awards ==
• Africa Peace Award – Africa regional body of the United Religions Initiative (URI) 2015 • Lennon-Ono Grant for Peace in Reyjkavik 2014 • Champion of Peace Award at the Sahara Balkan Peace Festival – 4 October 2013 • IVCA Fellowship – 19 October 2011 • Carnegie-Wateler Peace Prize 2010 in The Hague – 1 December 2010 • Cinema for Peace 2009 – Most Inspirational Movie of the Year (The Day After Peace) • Geneva Cinema Vérité – Cinema Vérité Award (The Day After Peace) • Zimbabwe International Film Festival – Best Documentary Award (The Day After Peace) • Britain's Best Award 2008 (Campaigner of the Year) • IVCA Clarion Award Winner 2008 – Champion Award • James Hammerstein Award 2006

== Impact Profile ==
Impact Profile is a social media platform created by Chelsea Apps, for individuals who wish to measure and showcase their own positive social contribution, to create a legacy of peace and sustainability for future generations, to inspire other people globally to achieve a positive social impact and help realise the UN's Global Goals.

Impact Profile was launched at the Oxford Union, Oxford University, UK on Sunday 14 October 2018, by founder Jeremy Gilley and Peace One Day Ambassador Jude Law, along with the President of the Oxford Union, Stephen Horvath. Notable attendants included Professor Kalypso Nicolaidis and Oxford's Lord Mayor Cook.

== See also ==
- List of anti-war organizations
- List of peace activists
