= Glenadrienne =

- Location within Gauteng Location within South Africa
- Coordinates: 26°5′34″S 28°1′51″E
- Country: South Africa
- Province: Gauteng
- Municipality: City of Johannesburg
- Main Place: Sandton

Area
  - Total: 0.30 km^{2} (0.12 sq mi)

Population (2011)
  - Total: 469
  - Density: 1,600/km^{2} (4,000/sq mi)

Racial makeup (2011)
  - Black African: 26.4%
  - Coloured: 2.8%
  - Indian/Asian: 2.8%
  - White: 66.4%
  - Other: 1.7%

First languages (2011)
  - English: 65.1%
  - Afrikaans: 8.5%
  - Northern Sotho: 5.3%
  - Zulu: 4.5%
  - Other: 16.6%
- Time zone: UTC+2 (SAST)
- Postal code (street): 2196

Glenadrienne is a suburb of Johannesburg, South Africa. It is located in Region B of the City of Johannesburg Metropolitan Municipality. This residential neighborhood lies south of Lyme Park, southwest of Littlefillan, north of Riepen Park and east of Randburg.
