= Lisa Schultz =

American new media and arts entrepreneur

Lisa Schultz (born 1965) is an American new media and arts entrepreneur and founder of the non-profit organization, The Peace Project, as well as TheWhole9.com, an international social networking site for artists and other creatives, and The Whole 9 Gallery, an art gallery located in Culver City, California.

== Career ==
Following over a decade working in the advertising industry, Schultz founded Out Of Bounds, an experiential marketing company in 1999. In 2007 Schultz founded TheWhole9.com, a social networking site for artists. Immediately after, she opened an art gallery, The Whole 9 Gallery.

In 2010, galvanized by the work of peace activist Jeremy Gilley and photojournalist Pep Bonet who shot a series of photographs showing Sierra Leone's amputee soccer players reclaiming their lives after Sierra Leone's Civil War, The Peace Project, powered by the social networking site TheWhole9.com, was launched. Sierra Leone was identified as the starting point for their work which has since expanded to include disaster relief and community building work in the Philippines in the wake of Typhoon Haiyan.

== Humanitarian Work ==
Operation Rise, Sierra Leone The Peace Project's inaugural endeavor was in Sierra Leone; Operation Rise provided crutches to people, many of whom, due to the loss of limbs through amputation during the civil war as well as disabilities, had little personal mobility.

On September 11, World Peace Day 2011, The Peace Project distributed 10,000 pairs of crutches to amputees, polio survivors and women and children across the entire country of Sierra Leone.

According to Mahimbo Mdoe, the country representative for UNICEF which supported The Peace Project on this effort, a pair of crutches can change someone's life "For these people, it will mean they are able to move around," he said, adding that it will allow men and women to hold jobs, while children will be able to get to and from school. "To the person who gets a pair, it will be everything.
