= The Bala Brothers =

South African music group

- Genres: Choirs; Opera
- Years active: 2006–present
- Label: Bala Brothers Production
- Members: Zwai Bala - Born 15 February 1975; Loyiso Bala - Born 22 September 1979; Phelo Bala - Born 24 March 1991
- Website: balabrothers.com

The Bala Brothers are a vocal trio from the Kwa Nobuhle Township outside Port Elizabeth in the Eastern Cape. The group consists of brothers Zwai Bala, Loyiso Bala, and Phelo Bala. The brothers first gained prominence when Zwai Bala joined the Drakensberg Boys' Choir School in 1988, becoming the first black member of the previously segregated group six years before the end of apartheid.

== Family life ==
The brothers were born into a musical family. The brother's parents first met singing in church choirs, and their grandfather was a choral composer.

== Individual Careers ==
=== Zwai ===
Zwai Bala, the eldest of the brothers, was born on 15 February 1975. In 1988, at age 13, Zwai made history by becoming the first black member of the then-segregated Drakensberg Boys' Choir School. In 1995, after his time in Choir School, Zwai joined Kwaito group TKZee. At the 53rd Annual Grammy Awards in 2011, Zwai also was nominated for the Grammy for Best Traditional World Music Album in the World Music Field for his production work on Soweto Gospel Choir's Grace. Zwai also performed with TKZee at the 2010 World Cup in South Africa.

=== Loyiso ===
Loyiso Bala was born on 22 September 1979. Some years later, as Zwai did in 1988, Loyiso also joined the Drakensberg Boys' Choir School. In 2013, Loyiso was appointed UNAids National Goodwill Ambassador. In 2015, Loyiso won his first South African Music Awards since 2010, his third SAMA since his first in 1999 when he won the award for Best Faith Album for his release Power Love Sound.

In 2019, Bala visited Israel to film Israel Unveiled, a six-part documentary series exploring the country's history, culture, and contemporary developments. The series examined themes such as Judeo-Christian heritage, technological innovation, and the local start-up sector, and also featured segments on Israeli music, cuisine, and urban life in Tel Aviv.

=== Phelo ===
Phelo, the youngest of the three brothers, was born on 24 March 1991. He followed in his brothers' footsteps and also attended the Drakensberg Boys' Choir School. In 2011, he joined multi-award-winning gospel ensemble "Joyous Celebration" being with the group until 2015. He also released his self-titled debut solo album in 2011. In 2014, Phelo confirmed his calling as a sangoma, a high spiritual honour in indigenous South African culture.

== Collective Rise to Prominence ==
In 2006, the Bala Brothers came out with their first collective release, B3, on 28 September 2006, on Sony BMG Entertainment Africa. While the brothers continued to work on solo projects individually, they also continued to tour as a group. After Sony BMG dissolved, the brothers released another LP, Live at Emperors Palace, on 7 May 2013, through their own label, Bala Brothers Production. Later that year, the Bala Brothers performed at the Cape Town Stadium in a memorial service Nelson Mandela, after his death in December 2013.

=== Warner Classics ===
On 3 March 2015, Warner Classics, the classical division of Warner Music Group released the Bala Brothers US Debut, the self-titled Bala Brothers (Live). The album was recorded live at the Lyric Theatre in Johannesburg. By 12 March, the brothers' new album had reached 8th on Billboard's World Music Charts.

=== PBS Special ===
In the fall of 2014, the Bala Brothers signed a deal with PBS to air a live performance of their forthcoming album with Warner. The broadcast aired in beginning in March 2015, and the brothers also released a DVD of the performance with Warner.

== Discography ==
=== Albums ===
- B3
- Live at Emperors Palace
- Bala Brothers (Live)
