= Stanley Tshabalala =

South African soccer player and coach (1949–2024)

Personal information
- Date of birth: 15 March 1949
- Place of birth: Orlando East, Soweto, South Africa
- Date of death: 11 July 2024 (aged 75)
- Place of death: Centurion, South Africa

Senior career*
Years	Team	Apps	(Gls)
1968–1969	Orlando Preston Brothers		
1969–1970	Kaizer XI		
1970	Kaizer Chiefs		
- Pimville United Brothers
- African Wanderers
1974–1976	Vaal Professional		
1976–1977	Orlando Pirates		

Managerial career
- 1974: African Wanderers (player coach)
- 1978: Orlando Pirates
- Blackpool
- 1986–1988: Mamelodi Sundowns
- 1989: Mamelodi Sundowns
- 1992: South Africa
- Moroka Swallows
- 1994–1996: Amazulu
- * Club domestic league appearances and goals

Stanley "Screamer" Tshabalala (15 March 1949 – 11 July 2024) was a South African soccer player, coach and administrator.

Tshabalala was the first coach of South Africa national team after readmission to FIFA. He was the father of music icon Tokollo 'Magesh' Tshabalala.

== Playing career ==
Tshabalala began his playing career as a 19-year-old at Orlando Preston Brothers before moving to Kaizer XI in 1969 after the return of Kaizer Motaung.

Tshabalala was a founding member of Kaizer Chiefs in 1970. He later played for Pimville United Brothers, African Wanderers (as a player coach), Vaal Professional and in 1976 joined Orlando Pirates where a leg fracture would end his playing career in 1977.

== Managerial career ==
=== Orlando Pirates ===
In 1978 Tshabalala was appointed Orlando Pirates head coach and won his maiden title at the 1978 Champion of Champions.

=== Mamelodi Sundowns ===
While the manager of Blackpool, Tshabalala was approached by Mamelodi Sundowns owner Zola Mahobe and took over as head coach of the club in 1986. Tshabalala was credited with developing the shoe, shine, and piano playing style at the club which gained him the nickname Mr. Shoe, Shine and Piano. He won the 1986 Mainstay Cup in a 1–0 win over Jomo Cosmos to lift his first title at Sundowns. In 1987 he finished third in the league and three points behind eventual winners Jomo Cosmos. In 1988 he won the BP Top Eight Cup and Ohlsson's Challenge Cup against cross-town rivals Arcadia. He left Sundowns in 1988 with 54 wins, 29 draws, and 25 losses.

His second stint at the club came just 18-months later with Tshabalala winning the club's first treble losing only two matches in the league and managing to win the BP Top 8 and the JPS Knockout Cup.

=== South Africa ===
Tshabalala was the first coach of the South Africa national team after readmission to FIFA. He won the first game on 7 July 1992 after nearly two decades in international isolation, beating Cameroon 1–0 at Kings Park in Durban.

== Outside coaching ==
Tshabalala was the technical director of Kaizer Chiefs from 1996 to 2001.

He later joined rivals Orlando Pirates as technical director, a position he kept until his death in 2024.

== Personal life and death ==
Tshabalala was the father of kwaito musician Tokollo 'Magesh' Tshabalala of TKZee fame.

In March 2024 Tshabalala suffered a gunshot wound after a burglary at his Centurion residence. On 11 July 2024, he succumbed to complications from his injuries, at the age of 75.

== Honours ==
Orlando Pirates

- Champion of Champions: 1978

Mamelodi Sundowns

- Mainstay Cup: 1986
- BP Top Eight Cup: 1988, 1990
- Ohlsson's Challenge Cup: 1988
- NSL Castle League: 1990
- JPS Knockout Cup: 1990
