= St Stithians College =

Location
- 40 Peter Place, Lyme Park, Sandton; Johannesburg, Gauteng; South Africa; 26°04′58″S 28°01′05″E

Information
- School type: Private & boarding
- Motto: One and All
- Religious affiliation: Methodist Church
- Established: 28 January 1953; 73 years ago
- Founders: Albert Collins; Gilbert Tucker; William Mountstephens
- Locale: Suburban
- School number: +27 (011) 577-6000
- Headmaster: Boys' College: David du Toit; Girls' College: Dr Sally James
- Exam board: IEB
- Staff: 450 full-time
- Grades: Junior Prep: RRR-2; Boys' Prep: 3-7; Girls' Prep: 3-7; Boys' College: 8-12; Girls' College: 8-12
- Age: 3 to 18
- Enrollment: 742 boys & 530 girls
- Schedule: 08:00 - 15:00
- Campus: Urban campus
- Colours: Blue; Navy; Red; White
- Song: "The College Song"
- Nickname: Saints, The White, College
- Rivals: St John's College, Johannesburg; St David's Marist, Inanda; St Benedict's College, Bedfordview; St. Alban's College
- Yearbook: The Stythian
- School fees: R137,020 (boarding); R186,615 (annual tuition)
- Affiliations: Round Square; G30 Schools; ISASA
- Alumni: Old Stithians
- Website: www.stithian.com

St Stithians College (colloquially known as Saints) is a private Methodist school situated in the suburb of Lyme Park in the border of Sandton and Randburg in the Gauteng province of South Africa. Founded in 1953 by Albert Collins, William Mountstephens and Gilbert Tucker, it has consistently ranked amongst the top performing independent schools in South Africa. It follows a co-ordinate educational model within a village of schools consisting of boys' and girls' colleges, boys' and girls' preparatory schools, and a junior preparatory. It is built on a 100 hectare estate, one of the largest school campuses in the country.

The college is organized into six schools on its main campus in Johannesburg and maintains facilities at the Kamoka Bush School near Modimolle and the virtual St Stithians Online School. As a Methodist school, it has ties to Kearsney College, Epworth High School, Penryn College and Kingswood College.

The Boys' and the Girls' Colleges are members of the Round Square Conference of Schools and G30 Schools Conference.

St Stithians College is also the host of the annual Saints Sports Festival, the largest and longest continuous school sports festival in the world. The 2017 edition witnessed over 1,400 participants in 8 fields of sport, 200 fixtures and over 50,000 spectators.

== History ==
=== The Boys' College ===
The idea of setting up a Methodist school in Johannesburg came to Gilbert Tucker, who wanted to base it on the pattern of his old school, Kingswood College in Grahamstown. The Methodist accountant did not have the money, so he turned to people who would be interested in financing the school.

He met two Cornishmen, both born in 1859, Albert Collins and William Mountstephens, who were Methodists and promising new businessmen who had started to make a name for themselves in their new country.

Collins, who never married, died first. This led to the creation of the trust for building the Methodist school Tucker had dreamt of. The trust was formally opened in April 1941 and, at Mountstephens' suggestion, was named after Collins' birthplace, Stithians, a village in Cornwall. The trustees were D.F. Corlett, C.H. Leake, J.B. Webb and G.K. Tucker.

The trust purchased a piece of land, which was part of the farm Driefontein (one of the "fonteins" can be found on the grounds) for £8713 in 1943, but nothing further was achieved until after the War. At first it was thought that building costs might drop. The trustees waited until it became obvious that prices would not drop, and the decision to build was made in 1951.

Mountstephens lived to see the land purchased, but not the school built. His widow would take an active interest in the school until her death. The school was to have been a secondary school only, and at first, the debate on co-education was open. Circumstances were to make decisions for the trustees: the area was new and remote; its people wanted a boys' school and a preparatory school as well as a secondary school.

The first classes began on 28 January 1953, with Grades 1 and 2, and 8 and 9. On 3 February 1953 there was a formal opening ceremony. W.G.A. (Wally) Mears, formerly of Rondebosch Boys' High School, was the first headmaster, and taught English, Latin, History and Geography to the high school classes, with E.M. Harris teaching Maths, Science and Scripture, and Minnaar teaching Afrikaans. In the second year (1954), classes in the school ran from Grade 1 to Grade 10, and in 1956 the first group wrote the matriculation examination. As the school grew, Wally Mears, the headmaster, did less teaching, and became more of an administrator. The school's hall is named for him.

=== The Girls' College ===
St Stithians Girls' College was opened in 1995 to form the coordinate module with the Boys' College. The founding headmistress was Anne Van Zyl. The initial opening classes were grade 0-3, which was to expand rapidly to include all the grades up to and including grade 11 with the first grade 12 class being inducted in 1997. The Girls' College was originally named the St Stithians Girls' Collegiate, which would subsequently be changed when expanded. During 1994 the first classes would be held on the boys' side of the rugby field' using already available infrastructure. As a part of the co-ordination module girls' and boys' school often have mixed classes in Drama, English, isiZulu, Afrikaans, Art and Computer Science. In 1996, the collegiate moved across the field to newly developed complete school. The college facilities were further developed to include a large library, several computer rooms, a 'tuck shop', a gymnasium, and a lecture theatre used for assemblies and individual class plays. The first matriculents of the college sat their exams in 1997.

In 1999 the founding houses of the Girls' College were chosen. They were all named after towns in Cornwall, linking the college to its forebearers. The girls picked a name out of a hat to randomly divide the grades into the four houses. The names of the houses are Cambourne, Kenwyn, Stratton and Trewen respectively. These individual houses compete in various cultural and sporting house competitions as well as part take in different philanthropic endeavours. The uniform has changed over the years, with initially the girls wearing white floral dresses - which the girls' prep still uses as a summer uniform - to a blue and red checked skirt and white blouse. The first top was a white golf shirt but this was changed to a white blouse in 2008.

== House system ==
St Stithians College has a house system. Each house competes against each other in interhouse events to win the Harris Cup (Boys' College) at the end of the year. St Stithian's Boys' College has 10 houses, St Stithians Girls' College has 6, formerly 4.

== Academics ==
The colleges write the Independent Examinations Board exams.

IEB results	1999	2000	2001	2002	2003	2004	2005	2006	2007	2008	2009	2010	2011	2012	2013
Number of candidates	200						239	217	240	232	236	229	239	242	251
Number of failures	10	12	5	7			0	0	16						
University endorsement (%)	98	96	97	97			94	95	90						
A aggregates (%)	50						33	32	26						
A-B-C aggregates (%)	87														
Subject distinctions	239	251	306	352	323		366	321	348	312	328	393	385	511	394
Subject distinctions (%)										18.5	18.7	22.5	21.1	25.3	19.1
Number in top 50			7	2	7		3	1	5						
Bachelor's degree										209	216	205	217	232	245
Bachelor's degree (%)										90.1	91.5	89.5	90.8	95.9	97.6
Diploma, higher certificate										22	20	24	21	9	6
Diploma, higher certificate (%)										9.5	8.5	10.5	8.8	3.7	2.4
Did not qualify										1	0	0	1	1	0
Did not qualify (%)										0.4	0.0	0.0	0.4	0.4	0.0
Total all levels										1687	1753	1747	1822	2017	2068

== Sports ==
=== St Stithians Boys' College ===
The sports played at the school are:

- Athletics
- Basketball
- Canoeing
- Chess
- Cricket
- Cross country
- Cycling
- Golf
- Hockey
- Mountain biking
- Rowing
- Rugby
- Rugby sevens
- Soccer
- Squash
- Swimming
- Table tennis
- Tennis
- Volleyball
- Water polo

=== St Stithians Girls' College ===
The sports played at the school are:

- Athletics
- Basketball
- Chess
- Cross country
- Cycling
- Diving
- Equestrian
- Hockey
- Mountain biking
- Netball
- Rowing
- Soccer
- Squash
- Swimming
- Table tennis
- Tennis
- Volleyball
- Water polo

== 2026 incident ==
In August 2026, St Stithians College received national media attention following the deaths of Grade 11 pupil Cameron Waldeck-Cooks (17) and former pupil Ethan Coetzee (19), whose bodies were found at a holiday home near Sabie, Mpumalanga, on 3 August. The South African Police Service (SAPS) initially opened an inquest into the deaths before updating the investigation to a murder case following preliminary post-mortem examinations which indicated that Waldeck-Cooks died from strangulation and suffocation.

On 17 October, reports stated that Cameron's family alleged police had returned two cellphones before downloading their data. Her family's attorney said material subsequently found on Cameron's phone was "extremely disturbing" and supported the family's concerns about gender-based violence. These allegations, however, had not been independently corroborated, and the investigation remains ongoing as of 19 October 2026.

== Notable alumni from Boys' & Girls' College ==
=== Cricket ===
- Roy Pienaar (class of 1978), South African professional cricketer
- David Rundle (class of 1983), South African cricketer
- Alastair Storie (class of c1983), English and Scottish professional cricketer
- David Terbrugge (class of 1994), South African cricketer
- Grant Elliott (class of 1997), New Zealand cricketer
- Michael Lumb (class of 1998), England cricketer
- Enoch Nkwe (class of 2001), South African first-class cricketer
- Yassar Cook (class of 2011), South African first-class cricketer
- Kagiso Rabada (class of 2013), South African cricketer
- Ryan Rickelton (class of 2014), South African first-class cricketer.
- Marques Ackerman (class of 2014), South African first-class cricketer
- Neil Brand (Class of 2014), South African professional cricketer
- Ricardo Vasconcelos (class of 2015), South African first-class cricketer
- Harry Tector (class of 2017), Irish professional cricketer
- Kwena Maphaka (class of 2024), South African professional cricketer

=== Golf ===
- Haydn Porteous (class of 2010), South African professional golfer

=== Rugby ===
- Lance Sherrell (class of 1984), Springbok rugby player
- Brent Russell (class of 1996), Springbok rugby player
- Dave Wessels (class of 2000), South African-Australian head coach
- Jono Ross (class of 2008), Blue Bulls/Sale Sharks rugby player
- Innocent Radebe (class of 2013), South African rugby player
- Asenathi Ntlabakanye (class of 2017), Lions and Springbok rugby player
- TJ Maguranyanga (class of 2020), current NFL and former professional rugby playe

=== Rowing ===
- Holly Norton (class of 2011), British rower

=== Swimming ===
- Jean Basson (class of 2005), South African professional swimmer

=== Tennis ===
- Kevin Anderson (class of 2004), South African professional tennis player

=== Water polo ===
- Lwazi Madi (class of 2013), South African professional water polo
- Shakira January (class of 2020), South African professional water polo
- Jordan Wedderburn (class of 2020), South African professional water polo

=== Other sports ===
- Connor Beauchamp (class of 2015), South African field hockey
- Micaela Bouter (class of 2013), South African professional diver

=== Politics ===
- Ian Shapiro (class of 1968), political scientist
- James Lorimer M.P. (class of 1979), shadow minister for the Democratic Alliance
- Nigel Roberts (political scientist) - academic at Victoria University of Wellington in New Zealand

=== Theatre, film, broadcasting and acting ===
- Gavin Hood (class of 1981), filmmaker, screenwriter, producer, and actor

=== Music ===
- Dave Matthews (class of 1985), lead singer of the Dave Matthews Band
- Zwai Bala (class of 1994), member of TKZee
- Kabelo Mabalane (class of 1995), member of TKZee
- Tokollo 'Magesh' Tshabalala (class of 1995), member of TKZee
- Kyle Watson (class of 2006), South African DJ and record producer

== See also ==
- List of boarding schools
