= The Peace Project =

The Peace Project is a non-profit organization based in Culver City that was founded in 2010 by marketing and new media entrepreneur Lisa Schultz. The Peace Project's mission is to promote peace in its most tangible form: helping people in need. The Peace Project's initiatives include education, personal mobility, housing, vocational skills training and micro-lending.

== History ==
The Peace Project, powered by the social networking site TheWhole9.com, was launched in 2010. Sierra Leone was identified as the starting point for their work which has since expanded to include disaster relief and community building work in the Philippines in the wake of Typhoon Haiyan.

Immediately after launching, artists from around the world were mobilized to submit their art to The Peace Project's 1st Annual Call for Artists via TheWhole9.com. Since then, artists from around the world have submitted peace-related art which results in an annual art exhibit that travels throughout the United States. The Call for Artists and traveling exhibits have helped to provide funding for The Peace Project's work including Operation Rise.

== Projects ==
=== Operation Rise, Sierra Leone ===
Operation Rise was Peace Project's inaugural endeavor which was carried out on September 11, 2011 in Sierra Leone. The group provided 10,000 pairs of crutches to people, many of whom, due to the loss of limbs through amputation during the civil war as well as disabilities, had little personal mobility. Beneficiaries of the group's undertaking also include amputees, polio survivors and women and children. According to Mahimbo Mdoe, the country representative for UNICEF which supported The Peace Project, a pair of crutches can change someone's life:

"For these people, it will mean they are able to move around," he said, adding that it will allow men and women to hold jobs, while children will be able to get to and from school. "To the person who gets a pair, it will be everything."

=== Family to Family, Philippines ===
The Peace Project sought a way to assist people in the Philippines who have been left homeless after Typhoon Haiyan devastated many parts of the country on November 8, 2013. Working with a team of architects and engineers, the group designed a small house that can be built with roughly $500 in building materials and can be built within a day. Utilizing this design and a unique model whereby for a donation of $500, individuals or organizations can select a family and sponsor the building of their house, and with the support of local tradesmen and community volunteers, The Peace Project completed their first community of forty houses in Bantayan Island on November 8, 2014 which coincides with the anniversary of Typhoon Haiyan.
