= T. J. Maguranyanga =

Zimbabwean athlete (born 2002)

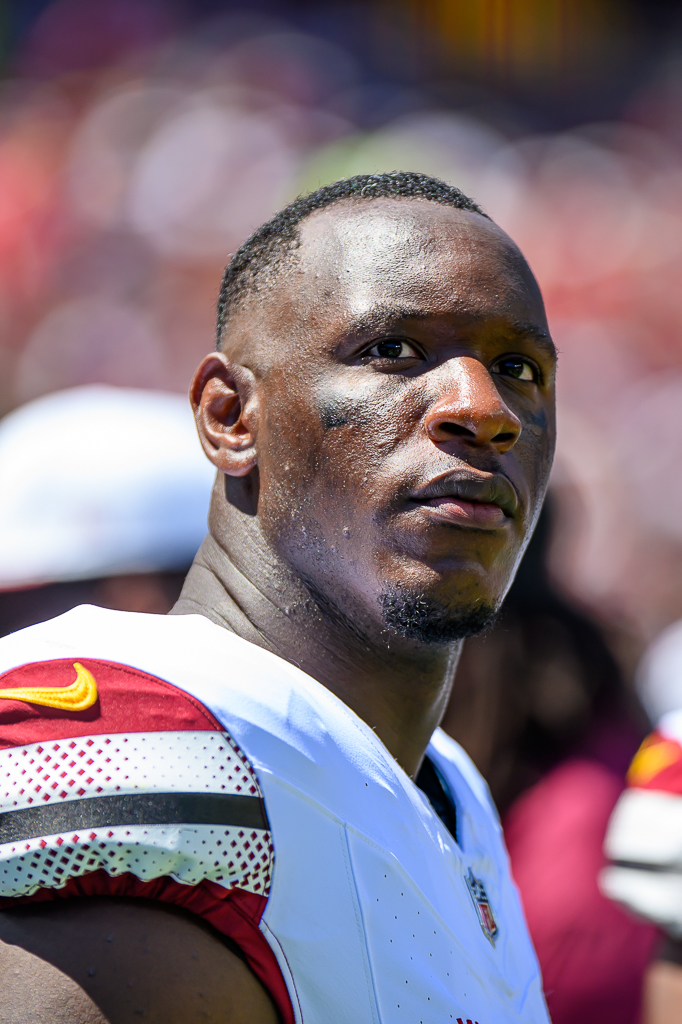
- Maguranyanga with the Washington Commanders in 2025

No. 59 – Washington Commanders
- Position: Defensive end
- Roster status: International

Personal information
- Born: 22 December 2002 (age 23); Harare, Zimbabwe
- Listed height: 6 ft 4 in (1.93 m)
- Listed weight: 222 lb (101 kg)

Career information
- High school: St Stithians College (Johannesburg, South Africa)
- NFL draft: 2025: undrafted

Career history
- Washington Commanders (2025–present)

Career NFL statistics as of 2025
- Tackles: 1
- Stats at Pro Football Reference

Other information

Rugby union career
- Position: Wing
Senior career
Years	Team	Apps	(Points)
2020–2021	Golden Lions	0	(0)
2021–2024	Clermont Auvergne	1	(0)

Thabani Jehiel Maguranyanga (born 22 December 2002) is a Zimbabwean professional athlete. Maguranyanga played rugby union as a wing for ASM Clermont Auvergne in the French Top 14 league and American football as a defensive end as part of the International Player Pathway program for the Washington Commanders of the National Football League (NFL).

== Early life and rugby union career ==
Maguranyanga was born on 22 December 2002 in Harare, Zimbabwe. He attended St Stithians College in Johannesburg, South Africa. Maguranyanga represented Zimbabwe at the Under-13 Craven Week in 2015. He went on to represent the Golden Lions at national youth competitions, playing in the Under-16 Grant Khomo Week in 2018 and Under-18 Craven Week in 2019. In 2019 he represented Zimbabwe Under-18 Sevens side at the Capricorn Group International Junior Sevens Tournament in Windhoek, Namibia. He was selected as a team captain in 2020.

== American football ==
Maguranyanga joined the National Football League (NFL)'s International Player Pathway (IPP) program in December 2024, signing with the Washington Commanders on April 3, 2025. He was waived on August 26, and signed with their practice squad the following day. Maguranyanga signed a reserve/futures contract with the Commanders on January 5, 2026, and remained under IPP eligibility.

On August 30, 2026, Maguranyanga was waived/injured and placed on injured reserve the next day after clearing waivers. He was released by Washington with an injury settlement on September 4. On October 7, 2026, the Commanders re-signed him to their practice squad.
