= Zwai Bala =

South African musician (born 1975)

- Born: Mzwandile Bala; 15 February 1975 (age 51); Uitenhage, Eastern Cape, South Africa
- Genres: Kwaito, Gospel
- Occupations: Rapper, singer, actor
- Years active: 1997–present
- Member of: The Bala Brothers; TKZee

Mzwandile Bala (known by his stage name Zwai Bala; born 15 February 1975) is a South African kwaito and gospel musician.

== Education ==
Bala studied at the Drakensberg Boys' Choir School, near Winterton, KwaZulu-Natal, and matriculated at St Stithians College in 1994. He then pursued an online Master's Certificate in Orchestration for Film and Television at Berklee College of Music in Boston. He came to public attention in 1997 as a member of the kwaito group TKZee.

== Career ==
When he was 11 years old, he entered The Shell Road to Fame talent show and reached the semi-finals. Together with school friends Kabelo Mabalane and Tokollo 'Magesh' Tshabalala, he formed kwaito group TKZee. TKZee released their singles "Take It Eezy", holiday hit "Phalafala" and their top-selling "Shibobo", which featured South Africa national football team player Benni McCarthy. Later, Bala began a solo musical career.

As a music director and producer, Bala has worked on musicals featuring Ali Campbell of UB40, produced Grace from the two-time Grammy award-winning Soweto Gospel Choir, and has been the featured soloist at the Classical FM–Lexus Soiree at the Sandton Intercontinental.

He was a celebrity contestant on the first season of the SABC 2 reality competition Strictly Come Dancing in 2006, partnered with professional ballroom dancer Kego Motshabi. The pair finished third.

== Songs ==
Bala's recorded music include:

- Ndize
- Umlilo-Masibase
- All I Do
- Black 'N Proud
- Ndiredi
- Moody's Mood For Love
- Nozamile
- Vuk'uzenzele
- Play That Music
- Kuyasa
- Ikhaya
- Bash'abafana
- Tino Tino
- Folkfanse-My Heritage
- Hand Prints
- Circle of Life
- Solo
- Soccer
- Gux Duo
- Niceland-Guguletu
- Everyone Can Drum
- Noble Peace
- Noyana

== Television ==
His television appearances include:

- All You Need Is Love – Season 2 – Host
- Clash of the Choirs South Africa – Season 1 – Choir Master
- Clash of the Choirs South Africa – Season 3 – Guest Judge
- Popstars – Season 2, 3 and 4 – Judge
- Pump Up The Volume – Season 1 – Judge
- Red Cake – Not the Cooking Show – Season 1 – Houseband leader

== Awards ==
In 2002 he received a South African Music Award (SAMA) for his single "Lifted" and in 2019 he, along with fellow TKZee members Kabelo Mabalane and Tokollo Tshabalala, received a SAMA award for Lifetime Achievement.
