= Kabelo Mabalane =

South African singer (born 1976)

Kabelo
- Born: Kabelo Mabalane; 15 December 1976 (age 49)
- Origin: Johannesburg, Gauteng, South Africa
- Genres: Kwaito, hip hop
- Occupations: Rapper, actor, CEO, pastor
- Years active: 1996–present
- Spouses: Gail Nkoane Mabalane (m. 2013)
- Children: 2
- Label: Faith Records
- Website: Official website

Kabelo Mabalane (born 15 December 1976), known by his stage names Bouga 2 Shoes or Bouga Luv, is a South African kwaito musician, songwriter and actor. He is a member of the kwaito trio TKZee. He has opened shows for world famous musicians such as Jay-Z, 50 Cent, Ja Rule and Rihanna. He co-owned Faith Records, a South African independent music company. He was also a judge on SA's Got Talent for two seasons in 2014.

== Music career ==
In 2000 Kabelo released his debut studio album Everybody Watching, which included the hit singles "Pantsula For Life" and "Amasheleni". The album went platinum within weeks of its release, selling 100 000 copies. He soon made a followed up release with his second studio album titled Rebel With A Cause which included the hit singles "It's My House" and "Ayeye". The album proved to be another huge success, reaching double platinum status, selling 130 000 copies.

Kabelo won best kwaito album South African Music Award in 2003 for his second studio album, Rebel with a Cause. He followed up with his third studio album And the beat goes on selling 150 000 copies triple platinum with the hit singles Zonke, Reverse Yomhlaba & Zibuzwala Kimi. He won the 2004 Kora Award for Best Southern Africa Male Artist.

In 2005, Kabelo signed a deal with Reebok to produce a sneaker called Bouga Luv.

He has run the Comrades Marathon on three occasions from 2006 to 2008. In 2008 he finished just under the 10-hour mark. He also featured on the August 2008 cover of Runner's World magazine.

Along with his TKZEE bandmates (Tokollo 'Magesh' Tshabalala and Zwai Bala), Kabelo performed at 2010 FIFA World Cup Opening Ceremony.

Throughout high school, Kabelo was very active in sports. In 2005 he started to prepare for the Comrades Marathon, a 93 km race. Since 2006, to date, he has entered and completed five of the races. In 2008 the South African Sports Confederation Olympics Committee (SASCOC) chose him as an Olympic Ambassador.

In April 2010 Kabelo was named as the presenter of a new multi-sport and lifestyle talk-show on South Africa's SABC2 channel that airs on Fridays at 21:30.

At the 30th SAB Sports Journalist of the Year Awards, on 6 September 2010, Kabelo received the Best Newcomer Overall and Best Newcomer Television Presenter awards.

== Personal life ==
Kabelo attended the prestigious boys' school St. Stithian's College in Randburg, Johannesburg, along with future TKZee bandmates, Zwai Bala and Tokollo Tshabalala.

He married South African actress, Gail Nkoane, in a private ceremony on 9 February 2013. The couple have two children together; a daughter, Zoe Leano Mabalane, born on 28 March 2015, and a son named Khumo born on 31 Jan 2018.

== Discography ==
=== Solo albums ===
- 2001: Everybody Watching
- 2002: Rebel With A Cause
- 2003: And the Beat Goes On
- 2004: Bouga Luv Album
- 2006: Exodus
- 2007: I'm A King
- 2011: Immortal - Vol. 1
- 2012: Immortal - Vol. 2
- 2015: Immortal - Vol 3
- 2026: For King & Country

=== Albums with TKZee ===
- 1996: Take It Eazy
- 1997: Phalafala
- 1998: Shibobo
- 1998: Halloween
- 1999: Guz 2001 (TKZee family)
- 2001: Trinity
- 2005: Guz hits
- 2009: Coming Home
