= Penryn College (South Africa) =

Penryn

Location
- Mbombela, Mpumalanga; South Africa
- Coordinates: 25°24′31″S 30°58′32″E

Information
- Type: Preparatory & College
- Motto: One and All
- Religious affiliation: Methodist Church
- Established: 1991; 35 years ago
- Sister school: St Stithians College
- Headmaster: Mr Michael Eisen
- Head teacher: IEB
- Grades: 0000–12
- Gender: Boys & Girls
- Age: 3 to 18
- Enrollment: 1,500 pupils
- Language: English
- Schedule: 07:30 - 15:00
- Houses: Goshawk; Harrier; Kite; Kestrel
- Colours: Blue; Red; White
- Rival: Uplands College
- Newspaper: Penryn Post
- Website: http://www.penryn.co.za/

Penryn is a co-educational, English-medium private school situated in Nelspruit, Mpumalanga, South Africa. It is also a global member of Round Square. Penryn was officially started in 1991 in a Methodist church in Plaston, Mpumalanga, with 13 pupils and 2 teachers, as a sister school to St Stithians College in Randburg, Johannesburg. Two years later, the college moved to its own campus on Boschrand Ridge, where it was officially opened by Enos Mabuza.

== Name ==
Penryn is named after Penryn, Cornwall. The name Penryn means "Top of the Hill" in the Cornish language. The college is indeed situated on top of a hill. This is often used as a metaphor by Penryn when it refers to itself as the light on the hill. A reference to it seeing itself as being a light of hope on the hill.

== Sports ==
Sports played at Penryn College include:

- Athletics
- Basketball
- Cricket
- Hockey
- Rugby
- Soccer
- Swimming
- Tennis
- Netball
- Chess
- Falconry

== See also ==
- Independent Schools Association of Southern Africa
