= Tokollo 'Magesh' Tshabalala =

South African musician (1976-2022)

Tokollo
- Also known as: Magesh
- Born: Tokollo Tshabalala; 14 October 1976; Johannesburg, South Africa
- Died: 15 August 2022 (aged 45) Johannesburg, South Africa
- Genre: Kwaito
- Occupations: Musician; Singer; Songwriter
- Instrument: Vocals
- Years active: 1996–2022
- Labels: BMG, TKZee Recordz

Tokollo "Magesh" Tshabalala (14 October 1976 – 15 August 2022) was a South African musician and a founding member of the iconic kwaito group TKZee. Renowned for his charismatic stage presence and lyrical prowess, he played a pivotal role in popularizing kwaito music during the late 1990s and early 2000s also known as the greatest kwaito lyricist of all time. He was the son of soccer legend Stanley "Screamer" Tshabalala.

== Early life and career ==
Tokollo Tshabalala was born on 14 October 1976 in Johannesburg, South Africa, into a prominent footballing family. His father, Stanley "Screamer" Tshabalala, was a legendary footballer and coach, known for his contributions to South African football. Despite his family's sporting legacy, Tokollo chose a career in music. Screamer later revealed he never wanted his son to be a music singer, instead hoped that he would follow him into soccer.

In the mid-1990s, Magesh formed the group TKZee with schoolmates Kabelo Mabalane and Zwai Bala at St Stithians College in Sandton, Johannesburg. TKZee's debut album, Take It Eezy, was released in 1996. The trio quickly gained popularity with their debut single Phalafala in 1997, which became a massive hit. Their subsequent releases, including Shibobo (1998), a collaboration with then-Bafana Bafana striker Benni McCarthy, solidified their status in the South African music scene. Later in 1998, they released their first full album, Halloween, which became a huge hit with smash singles Dlala Mapansula, " Mambotjie & We Love This Place. The album was certified Platinum by the Recording Industry of South Africa (RISA), with over 200 000 copies sold and four South African Music Awards (SAMA) for Best Kwaito Album, Best Duo/Group, Best Single and Best Kwaito Single. They released more albums, Guz 2001, Trinity, Guz Hits and Coming Home.

=== Solo career ===
He launched his solo career at the turn of the millennium after the initial success of TKZee. In 2000, he released his debut album Ndabezitha, which featured the hit Indlovu Iyangena and established him as a serious force in the kwaito scene beyond the group. Two years later, in 2002, he returned with Gusheshe, under Columbia and Electromode, a project that carried his signature lyrical style and energy. That same year, he teamed up with fellow kwaito giants Kabelo and Mandoza on the collaborative album All In One, which produced the single It’s All Right, a track that captured the era’s sound of township youth culture.

By 2004, he released Waarheid (Is’kathi), also released Sgubh' Sam with Zwai Bala, Khala Kahle and in 2006 he came back with The Longest Time. He was the co-owner of Heist Entertainment His consistency was further evident in 2014 with the release of The Hit Man, which became his last major solo project.

== Accident and legal battle ==
In October 2007, Tshabalala appeared in a magistrate’s court in Gaborone, Botswana, where he pleaded not guilty to two counts of causing death by dangerous driving, the equivalent of culpable homicide in South Africa. The charges stemmed from a head-on collision in the Mogoditshane village on 17 March 2001, in which businesswoman Maria Josephine Monyatsi and passenger Tumelo Desmond Monaisa were killed.

The trial began in late February 2008, during which defence counsel Collin Garvey pointed to contradictions in state witnesses’ testimony. One witness fainted during cross-examination, while another gave conflicting evidence about the circumstances of the crash. The defence also argued that the police investigation was flawed, noting that an investigating officer had omitted mention of a minibus involved in the collision. The prosecution maintained that multiple witnesses had identified Tshabalala as the driver.

On 3 March 2008, Magistrate Lot Moroka acquitted Tshabalala. While the court accepted evidence that placed him behind the wheel, it found insufficient proof of dangerous driving and criticised lapses in the police investigation.

Although he was acquitted, friends later recalled that the experience left a deep emotional mark on him. At his 2022 memorial service, colleagues and close friends described the seven years he spent awaiting trial as “a very stressful time” and said that Tshabalala “went through it like a soldier.” Music associate Mncedisi Mpofu remembered the accident occurring on Tshabalala’s 21st birthday, noting that those close to him were unsure if he would survive. He added that, despite his acquittal, Tshabalala “could never shake it off.” Another friend, Zisuliwe Maisela, reflected that their friendship “was never the same after the Botswana tragedy,” and that even after the acquittal, Tshabalala struggled to fully move on.

== Death ==
Tokollo Tshabalala died on 15 August 2022 at the age of 45. According to a statement from his family, he died from an epileptic seizure at his home in Johannesburg.

== Discography ==
=== With TKZee ===
- Take It Eezy (1996, TKZee Rekordz)
- Halloween (1998, BMG Africa)
- Shibobo (with Benni McCarthy) (1998, BMG Records Africa)
- Guz 2001 (as TKZee Family) (1999, BMG Records Africa / TKZee Rekordz)
- Trinity (1999, BMG Africa / Hola)
- Coming Home (2009, Sony Music South Africa)

=== Singles and EPs ===
- Palafala (1997, BMG Records Africa)
- Halloween (12" promo sampler) (1998, BMG Africa)
- Shibobo (with Benni McCarthy) (1998, BMG Records Africa)
- Izinja Zam (Ina Di Jungle) (as TKZee Family) (2000, TKZee Rekordz)

=== Compilation albums ===
- Guz Hits (2005, BMG Africa)

=== Video releases ===
- Guz Hits – The Video Collection (2009, TKZee Rekordz, DVD)

=== Miscellaneous (Collaborations) ===
- With Pitbull and Dario G – Game On (2010, Sony Music)
- With Brenda Fassie – Sum' Bulala / Dlala Mapantsula (7" jukebox single, date unknown)
- Take It Eezy (1996)
- Shibobo (1998)
- Power of 10 (2000)
- Soweto South Africa - SOSA (2004)

=== Solo Work ===
- Ndabezitha (2000, Electromode)
- Gusheshe (2002, Columbia / Electromode)
- All In One (2002, CSR Records)
- Waarheid (Is'kathi) (2004, Electromode)
- The Longest Time (2006, Universal Music South Africa)
- Heist (2012, Universal Music South Africa)
- Ndabezitha & Waarheid (Is'kathi) (2×CD, Electromode, date unknown)

=== Singles and EPs ===
- It's All Right (I See You) (feat. Kabelo & Mandoza) (2002, Electromode)
- Indlovu Iyangena (12" maxi-single, Primedia Record Company, date unknown)

=== Compilation albums ===
- The Early Years (Electromode, date unknown)
