= Swish (hip-hop producer) =

American rapper

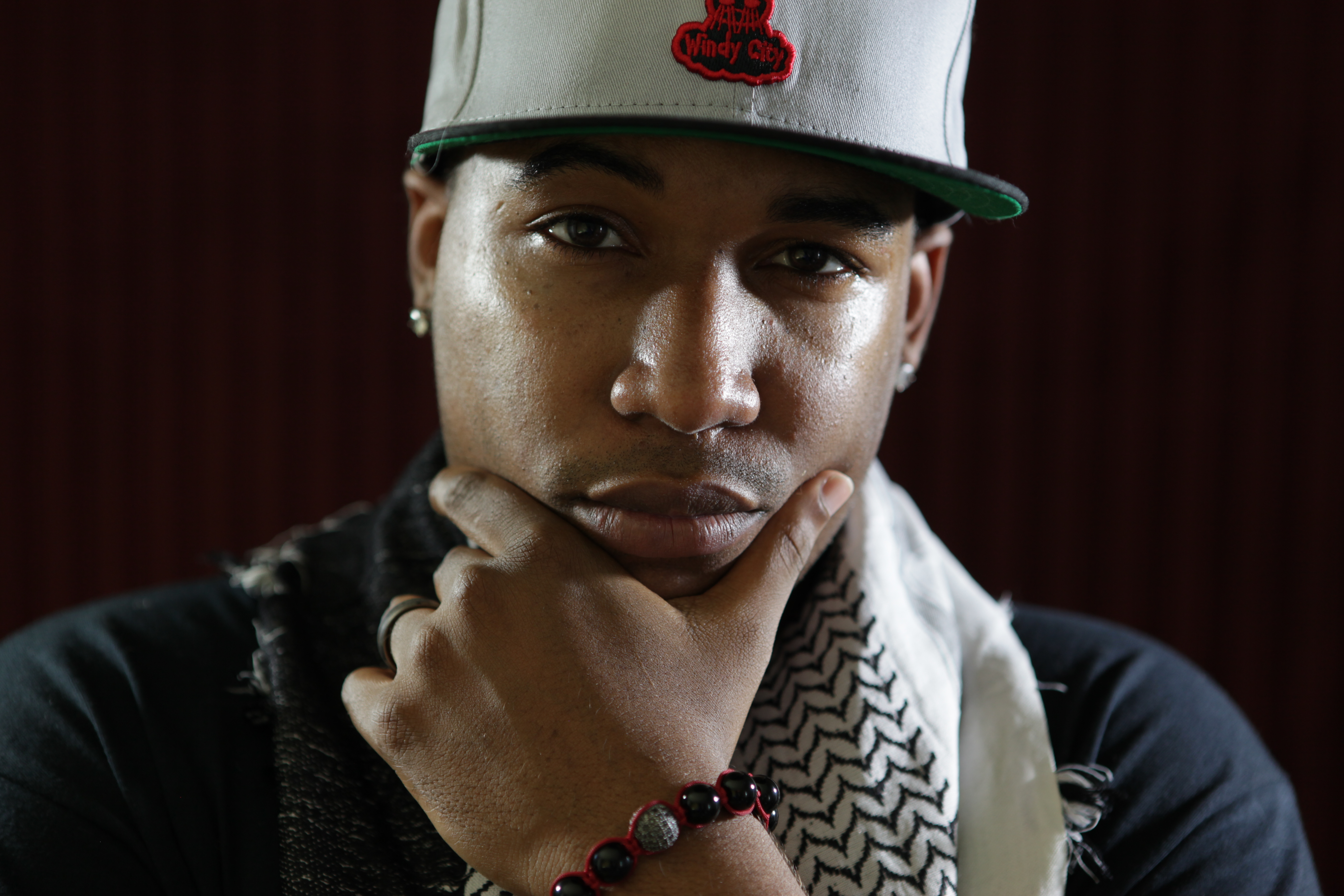
- Whitfield in April 2012

Background information
- Born: Jonathan Whitfield
- Origin: Clinton, Mississippi, United States
- Genres: Hip hop
- Occupation: Singer-songwriter
- Instruments: Vocals, keyboards, sampler, percussion, synthesizer
- Years active: 2008–present

Jonathan Whitfield (born May 10) known by his stage name Swish, is an American hip hop producer/rapper from Mississippi. He is a solo artist and is also a member of hip hop duo Mr & Mrs in which he is the main producer and co-writes/performs songs with his wife Nadirah X.

== Early life ==
Swish grew up in Clinton, Mississippi where he lived with his parents. He was primarily an athlete. His father, an established pianist, introduced him to multiple genres of music including blues, jazz, gospel, and classical, with a few of his favorites being Donny Hathaway and Rachmaninoff. This would all ultimately have an influence on his production style. As a teenager, Swish participated in multiple cyphers to hone his skills as a rapper.

In high school, Swish played basketball for his high school team that was ranked third in the state (Mississippi). A popular student gave him the nickname Swisha after a game. When he pursued hip hop full-time, he shortened it to Swish.

Swish attended the University of Southern Mississippi where he initially majored in Athletic training. He later changed his major to and graduated with a B.S. degree in software engineering. While in college, Swish was chosen to participate in a free throw competition in which the winner of the competition would receive free tuition. Swish won the competition and purchased music equipment that would start his production career. He would later sell his music equipment to be able to afford his move from Mississippi to Los Angeles.

== Music career ==
=== 2006–2010 ===
Upon graduating from college in 2006, Swish self-produced his entire first mixtape entitled Voice of the Crooked, Vol. 1. Songs from the mixtape can still be found on YouTube. This mixtape gained traction in the southeastern part of the US. After his first mixtape, Swish started working on and submitting demos to various record labels. After submitting demos, Swish never heard back from any of the record labels that he submitted to. Figuring that his home state of Mississippi couldn't support his musical ambitions, he moved to Los Angeles.

Upon moving to Los Angeles, Swish met female Jamaican rapper Nadirah X. She introduced him to Dave Stewart of the Eurythmics, whom was managing Nadirah X, and Glen Ballard who is a native Mississippian. Swish began working with them and with Mick Jagger. Afterwards, Swish worked with various artists in the L.A. area including Nadirah X and Bishop Lamont as well as performances around the country with Nadirah.

In 2009, Swish worked with Greek Superstar, Anna Vissi. With a summer tour approaching, Vissi asked Swish to produce a tour intro for her summer tour entitled, Apagorevmeno Summer Tour. Swish produced her tour intro to which, Nadirah X lent vocal support and it was filmed. The video support began each show of Vissi's summer tour. Swish has said that Vissi described his sound as "big" and "ambitious".

In 2010, Swish released his first EP, Invincible. The album was recorded in Glen Ballard's studio. The EP featured guitar from Joanne Shaw Taylor and Mike Bradford as well as violin from Ann Marie Calhoun.

In a 2013 interview, Swish stated that his favorite producers all-time were Just Blaze, Kanye West, DJ Premier, Swizz Beatz, and Organized Noize. In this same interview, Swish stated that he grew up on Outkast, Jay-Z, Nas, and Notorious B.I.G. and that this music molded his musical taste as a kid.

=== 2010: Mr and Mrs ===
"With its driving beats, hard-hitting, heartfelt, intelligent lyrics, rousing instrumentation, and propulsive samples, Mr. & Mrs. conveys the artists' busting-at-the-seams impatience with a system, a music industry, a society that stands in the way of genuine self-expression, innovation, originality and soul.."

— Huffington Post

Swish and Nadirah X wed in 2010. Shortly after their marriage, Nadirah began traveling around the world working with Tim Kring for the Conspiracy Of Good web series. The main part of the web series was filmed in London, where Swish and Nadirah performed at various venues. At the end event of Conspiracy For Good, Swish performed alongside Dave Stewart, Ann Marie-Calhoun, and Nadirah X. After London, Swish and Nadirah flew to Jamaica, and received an email from Dave Stewart asking them to start a duo. Swish and Nadirah agreed, and after Stewart named them "Mr & Mrs. Swish" they began working on production for the project, and the two wrote the songs together. After sending demo versions of songs back to Stewart, they decided to go ahead with the project. In 2011, the duo came back to Los Angeles and began working on music for the Mr & Mrs album.

"As Mister + Misses, their sound is epically elegant hip hop that is richly layered with instrumentation that recalls both the classical influences of Swish's father and the sounds of Nadirah's native Jamaica."

— LA Weekly

=== 2012: Mr and Mrs EP release ===
In 2012, Swish released an EP with Nadirah X under the Mr & Mrs name, as a free download. The EP received positive reviews in The Huffington Post and LA Weekly, which praised his production style and their lyrical ability. In a YouTube interview by the blog "At Street Level", their music and production was described as 'unique.' Dave Stewart is quoted as saying, "It's refreshing seeing a married couple working intensely together rapping about stuff that directly relates to them and their situation: one so many other couples can relate to," Stewart said. "I liken their spirit to Ashford and Simpsons when they sang 'solid, solid as a rock.'" Because of the success of the EP, Swish and Nadirah X have met with various record labels.

In 2012, Swish was featured on Bishop Lamont's mixtape, The Layover, twice. Swish can be heard on one track called "Trail Mix" and a second track entitled, "I Swear", featuring Royce da 5'9". Swish previously worked with Bishop on a track entitled "It's Over" featuring Rapper Big Pooh.
