= Littlefillan =

- Location within Gauteng Location within South Africa
- Coordinates: 26.086°S 28.044°E
- Country: South Africa
- Province: Gauteng
- Municipality: City of Johannesburg
- Time zone: UTC+2 (SAST)
- Postal code (street): 2196
- PO box: 2057

Littlefillan is a suburb of Johannesburg, South Africa. The tiny suburb in Sandton is separated between Morningside and Parkmore. It is located in Region E of the City of Johannesburg Metropolitan Municipality.

== History ==
Originally the land was a farm called Gilfillan's little farm name after its owner N.H. Gilfillan.
