= Disability in Sierra Leone =

According to the World Health Organization, an estimated 15% of the world's population experience some form of disability or impairment. The proportion of disabled people is much higher in Sierra Leone, a West African country which had emerged from a decade-long civil war back in 2002 where the trademark of the rebel groups was to hack off the limbs of civilians.

It is estimated that there are about 450,000 disabled people in Sierra Leone, although this number may be an under-representation. Common disability issues include blindness, deafness, war wounded including amputees, and polio.

== Socioeconomics ==
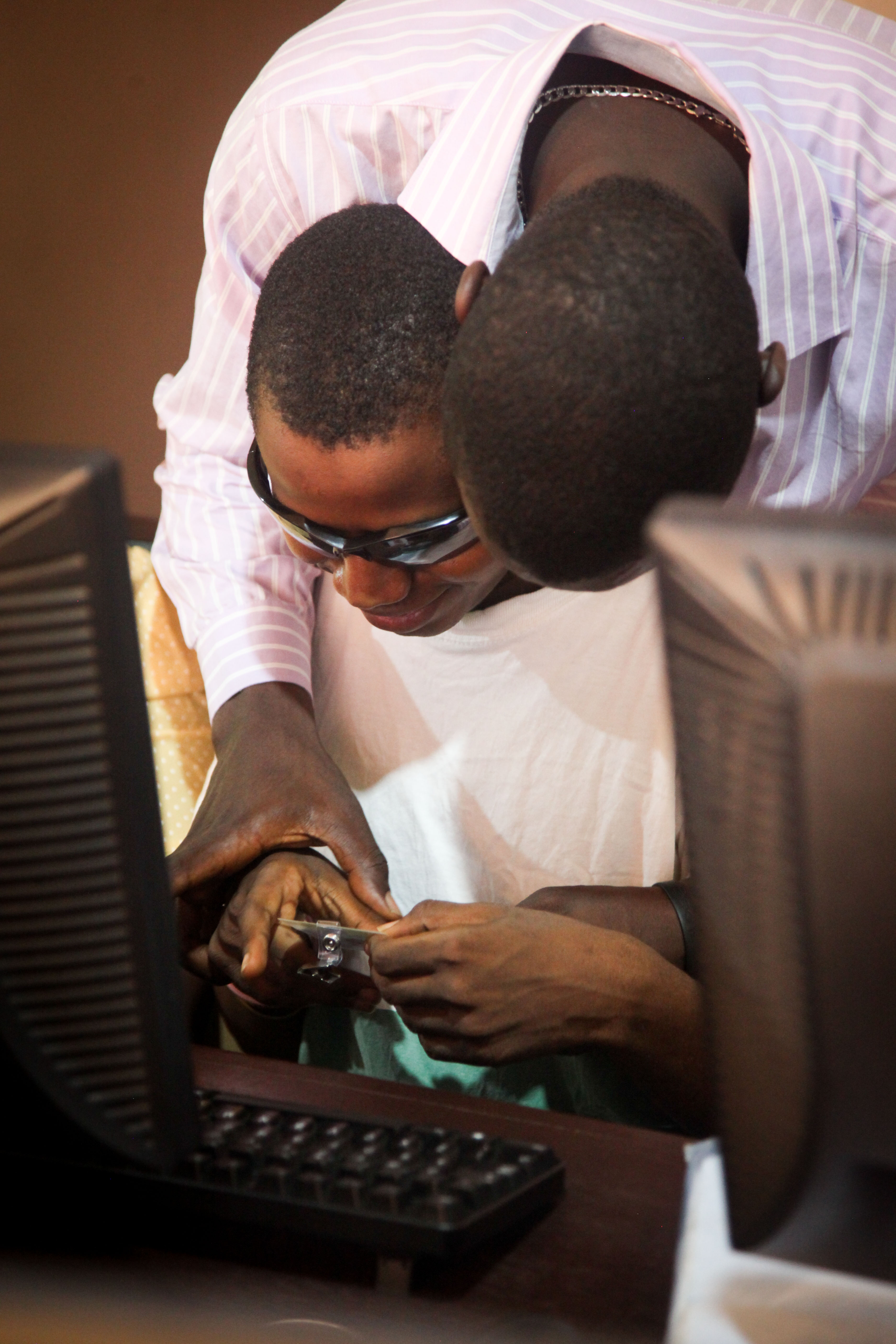
Dorothy Springer Trust (DST) volunteer, Nelson, supports visually impaired student, Osman, during a lesson.

In a 2009 study of disability in Sierra Leone, one third of the disabled people surveyed were employed while twice as many disabled people (16.4%) had no access to healthcare as compared to non-disabled people (7.1%). In addition, according to the United Nations Development Programme, only 35% of Sierra Leone's population above 15 years of age is educated and the statistic is even lower for citizens with disabilities. Poor people are also more at risk of acquiring a disability due to a lack of access to sanitation as well as a safe living and working environment.

== Mental health ==
Mental healthcare in Sierra Leone is almost non-existent. Many individuals try to cure themselves with the help of traditional healers. During the Civil War (1991–2002), many soldiers took part in atrocities and many children were forced to fight. This left them traumatised, with an estimated 400,000 people (by 2009) being mentally ill. Thousands of former child soldiers have fallen into substance abuse as they try to blunt their memories.

== Government policy ==
The government of Sierra Leone does not provide any assistance to disabled citizens. In 2010, Bentry Kalanga, the senior programme manager of Africa for SOS Children's Villages, an international charity organization, said; "Disability has not been regarded as a major development issue up to now and it must be highlighted more."

In its 2011 report, the Human Rights Commission of Sierra Leone noted approvingly the passage in that year of the Persons with Disabilities Act 2011, which "would address the human rights concerns of Persons With Disability," but added "that this Act has not been popularized and not much has been done to implement it, particularly the establishment of the National Commission for Persons with Disability."
