= Drakensberg Boys' Choir School =

Drakensberg Boys Choir School

Location
- Drakensberg; South Africa, KwaZulu-Natal; 29°01′20″S 29°26′08″E

Information
- School type: Private
- Religious affiliation: Christian
- Established: 1967
- Founder: John Tungay
- Status: Open
- Grades: 4-9
- Gender: Male
- Website: dbchoir.com/web/

Drakensberg Boys Choir School is a choir school located near Winterton, KwaZulu-Natal, South Africa, at the foot of the Central Drakensberg mountain range. Performing in a variety of genres such as jazz, pop and African music, the choir is based in South Africa but also tours internationally.

== Organisation ==
The school was established in 1967 by John Tungay with assistance from his family. Typically, enrollment is about 120 boys, all aged 9 to 15. The school admitted its first black student in 1988, six years before the end of Apartheid. It has an extensive campus, including a 600-seat auditorium constructed in 1995, and holds weekly concerts for the local population. The Choir has toured internationally.

== Concert tours ==
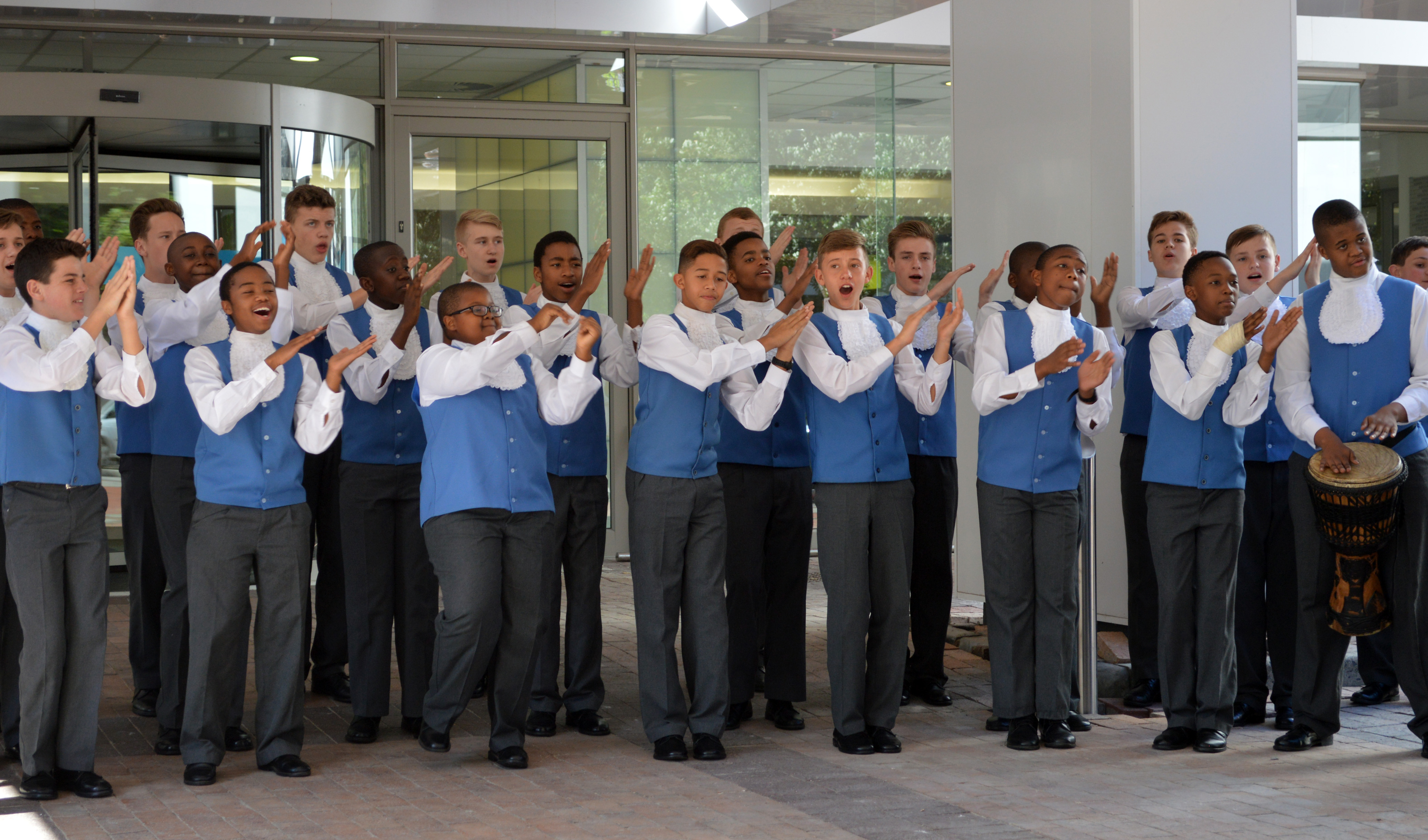
The Drakensberg Boys' Choir performing at the Media24 Centre in Cape Town in 2015.

The choir has presented concerts in the United States and across Europe and, by Papal request, at the Vatican City. They have also performed with South Korean artist Lee Moon-se. Every year, boys from the choir embark on an international tour. Recent locations for tours have included the United Kingdom, the United States, and Japan. While on tour, they often collaborate with other local youth choirs. In 1973 and 1975 the choir attended the Zimriya, the world choir festival, in Israel. On both occasions it was voted the best choir there. Other destinations in the 1970's included the UK, Holland, Belgium, and the Seychelles islands.

== Notable alumni ==
The Bala Brothers, the South African vocal trio, attended Drakensberg Boys Choir School in the 1980s and 90s. In 1988, six years before the end of Apartheid, the oldest brother, Zwai, was the first black student admitted to the school.

Jean-Philip Grobler, an indie electronic synthpop artist, sang in the Drakensberg Boys' Choir before moving to Brooklyn, NY to make music as St. Lucia.

Ralph Schmidt went on to become the director of the Mzansi Youth Choir, which appeared in America's Got Talent.

Swazi musician Manana won a Grammy Award for contributions to Burna Boy's album Twice as Tall.
