= Nadirah X =

Jamaican musician

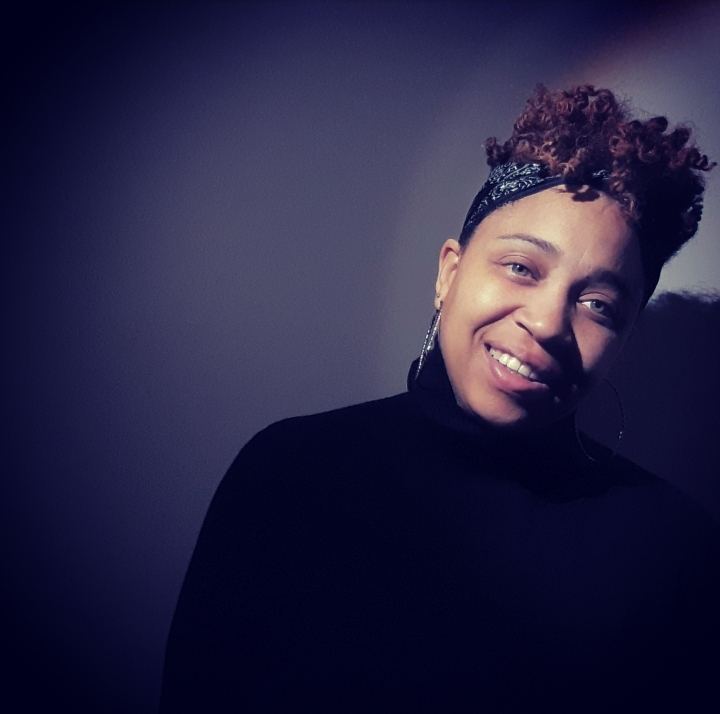

Background information
- Birth name: Nadirah Sabreen Seid
- Origin: St. Andrew, Jamaica
- Genres: Hip hop, poetry
- Occupation(s): Poet, writer, producer, performer
- Years active: 2000–present
- Labels: Weapons of Mass Entertainment, AMSUNA

Nadirah X, also known as Nadz (born Nadirah Sabreen Seid) is a Jamaican rap/hip hop artist and poet.

== Career ==
In 2002, Nadirah won the Irie FM / CME Big Break competition which led to a performance at Island Village where she met Brian Jobson and Dave Stewart from the Eurythmics. Impressed, Stewart signed her to his Europe-based label. She began touring Europe as the third member of DUP. Featured on the tours were Joanne Shaw Taylor, Candy Dulfer and Jimmy Cliff, with whom Nadirah wrote and recorded "Positive Mind" for his album Fantastic Plastic People. Later that year Nadirah won Best New Female Artist in Jamaica.

In 2003, Nadirah was commissioned by Coca-Cola to do a jingle for their Real Campaign in the Caribbean. At the same time, her track "I Hate This" was a part of the Lara Croft Tomb Raider: The Cradle of Life movie soundtrack. She also sang on and co-wrote the "Peace One Day" theme song with Dave Stewart, Camar, Mudbone and Jimmy Cliff.

In 2004, Nadirah appeared on the soundtrack for the film Alfie, singing the title track with Joss Stone and Rolling Stones lead man Mick Jagger.

In 2006, Nadirah recorded an album with Mudbone called FreshMud. The album was released in Europe and received good reviews, which led them to open for Pink on her European tour before headlining a club tour of their own.

Nadirah and Dave wrote and performed "Go Green (Greenpeace Anthem)" featuring recording artists such as Annie Lennox, Sarah McLachlan, Natalie Imbruglia, Imogen Heap and Bonnie Raitt. It was released on April 17, 2007. In May of that year, Nadirah travelled to Beijing, China to perform on the final night of the four-day Midi Rock Music Festival.

In 2008, Nadirah appeared on and co-wrote Annie Lennox's song "Womankind", which was featured in the 2008 film The Women.

Nadirah began writing and recording with Greek singer Anna Vissi in 2009 for Anna's English album with production from Patrick Leonard, Dave Stewart and Glenn Ballard.

Nadirah starred in Tim Kring and Nokia's Conspiracy For Good campaign. The pilot culminated with 4 weeks of live events and gameplay in London. As a result, Conspiracy For Good succeeded in building/stocking 5 libraries in Africa, funding 50 scholarships, and generating over 10,000 books for Zambian libraries through WeGiveBooks.org. On February 22, 2011, the Conspiracy For Good was nominated for an International Digital Emmy Award.

Later that year, Nadirah was invited to Brazil to perform at the Back to Black Festival.

In 2011, Nadirah's debut solo album Ink was released through Magic Records/Universal Poland. The album was executive produced by Dave Stewart. Later that year, Nadirah was asked to perform for Haakon, Crown Prince of Norway, Professor Pekka Himanen, John Hope Bryant and Bishop Desmond Tutu at the Global Dignity Concert in Finland. Nadirah wrote the Dignity Day theme song with Dave Stewart.

In 2012, Nadirah and Jon Fields released an EP under the name Mr. and Mrs. as a free download. The album received positive reviews in The Huffington Post and LA Weekly, which praised his production style and their lyrical ability.

Nadirah supported Jamaican singer Italee on a European tour in 2017.

Nadirah has just released a book of poetry, Never From Nowhere.

== Personal life ==
Nadirah grew up in an Islamic home in Jamaica. One of her older brothers, Melvin Jr., was a DJ in the early 1990s and introduced her to the music of artists such as Queen Latifah, Will Smith and A Tribe Called Quest. She was drawn to writing rap flows and poetry.

== Discography ==
- "Nobody's Coming" feat Olaf Blackwood Released January 22, 2022
- "I Hate This (M-Phatic Mix)" (Lara Croft: Tomb Raider: The Cradle of Life Sdtk) on Hollywood Records
- Alfie soundtrack "Wicked Time" with Joss Stone and Mick Jagger
- "Womankind" with Annie Lennox (Annie Lennox's album Songs of Mass Destruction and the movie The Women)
- Ink the EP
- "Go Green" single featuring Annie Lennox, Imogen Heap, Sarah McLachlan, and Natalie Imbruglia
- Fresh Mud album Mudbone featuring Nadirah X
- "Ordinary Girl" from ABC's Lincoln Heights
- Ink album
- UK FLUE Compilation - "Fight for Music" featuring J.Sol
- "Testimony" for Conspiracy For Good
- "The World Is Yours" with Jimmy Cliff from Fantastic Plastic People
- "Dignity" for Global Dignity Day
- Peace One Day theme song with Jimmy Cliff, Mudbone Cooper, Dave Stewart

=== Ink ===
==== Track listing and credits ====
Executive producer: Dave Stewart

1. "Testimony" - written by Nadirah X and Glen Ballard. Produced by Glen Ballard.
2. "Here It Comes" - written by Nadirah X, Ned Douglas, Dave Stewart and Annie Lennox. Produced by Dave Stewart and Ned Douglas
3. "Under the Rainbow" - written by Nadirah X and Glen Ballard. Produced by Glen Ballard.
4. "Blood on our Hands" - written by Nadirah X, Ned Douglas Produced by Ned Douglas
5. "Judas Blood" (featuring Swish) - written by Nadirah X and Jonathan 'Swish' Whitfield. Produced by Swish
6. "Finger on the Trigger" - written by Nadirah X, Ned Douglas Produced by Ned Douglas
7. "Good Day" (featuring Carina Round) - written by Nadirah X, Ned Douglas Produced by Ned Douglas
8. "Tuff Lyfe" - written by Nadirah X and Michael Bradford. Produced by Michael Bradford
9. "Ink" - written by Nadirah X
10. "These Times" (featuring Amy Keys) - written by Nadirah X and Glen Ballard. Produced by Glen Ballard.
11. "Ordinary Girl" - written by Nadirah X, Ned Douglas Produced by Ned Douglas
12. "Negativity" - written by Nadirah X, Ned Douglas Produced by Ned Douglas
13. "I Hate This" (Weapons Mix) - written by Nadirah X and Dave Stewart. Produced by Dave Stewart and Ned Douglas
14. "Reqless" (featuring DNA) - written by Nadirah X, Derrick 'DNA' Ashong and Michael Bradford. Produced by Michael Bradford
