= Shibobo =

Single by TKZee featuring Benni McCarthy

from the album Shibobo
- Released: 1998
- Recorded: 1998
- Genre: Kwaito

TKZee singles chronology
"Phalafala" (1997)	"Shibobo" (1998)	"Dlala Mapansula" (1999)

Benni McCarthy singles chronology
"Shibobo" (1998)

Music video
- "Shibobo" on YouTube

"Shibobo" is a successful 1998 South African single by South African kwaito music group TKZee and features South African football player Benni McCarthy. It is also the title song from TKZee's second album Shibobo.

The song released in the run-up to the 1998 FIFA World Cup in France samples greatly on "The Final Countdown" by Europe and features the vocals of Benni McCarthy. He also appears in the football-themed music video for the song.

Sales of the single topped the 100,000 mark in just over a month in South Africa, making "Shibobo" the fastest and biggest selling CD single by TKZee or any other South African recording artist. The song was also a hit in other African music charts.

The song enjoyed a comeback in a re-release in 2010-2011.

== Track list ==
1. Shibobo
2. Guz
3. Serenade
4. Guz (Instrumental)
5. Shibobo (With Crowd) Final Countdown
6. Serenade met Gwyza
7. Guz Luv (instrumental)
8. Shibobo (Stadium mix)

== Charts ==
Weekly chart performance
Chart (2026)	Peak position
South Africa Airplay (TOSAC)	18
