= Lyme Park, Gauteng =

Lyme Park
- Location within Gauteng Location within South Africa Location within Africa
- Coordinates: 26.083°S 28.013°E
- Country: South Africa
- Province: Gauteng
- Municipality: City of Johannesburg
- Main Place: Sandton

Area
  - Total: 1.34 km^{2} (0.52 sq mi)

Population (2011)
  - Total: 1,365
  - Density: 1,020/km^{2} (2,640/sq mi)

Racial makeup (2011)
  - Black African: 39.4%
  - Coloured: 2.1%
  - Indian/Asian: 4.7%
  - White: 53.3%
  - Other: 0.4%

First languages (2011)
  - English: 68.4%
  - Afrikaans: 9.0%
  - Zulu: 4.7%
  - Northern Sotho: 2.8%
  - Other: 15.1%
- Time zone: UTC+2 (SAST)

Lyme Park is a suburb of Johannesburg, South Africa. It is located in Region B of the City of Johannesburg Metropolitan Municipality.

== Education ==
Lyme Park houses a co-ordinate education to St Stithians College as a private English speaking school.
