= Riepen Park =

- Location within Gauteng Location within South Africa
- Coordinates: 26.110°S 28.030°E
- Country: South Africa
- Province: Gauteng
- Municipality: City of Johannesburg

Area
  - Total: 3.81 km^{2} (1.47 sq mi)

Population (2011)
  - Total: 957
  - Density: 251/km^{2} (651/sq mi)

Racial makeup (2011)
  - Black African: 64.2%
  - Coloured: 13.9%
  - Indian/Asian: 6.7%
  - White: 13.9%
  - Other: 1.3%

First languages (2011)
  - English: 31.1%
  - Zulu: 19.6%
  - Afrikaans: 12.1%
  - Xhosa: 5.2%
  - Other: 31.9%
- Time zone: UTC+2 (SAST)

Riepen Park is a suburb of Johannesburg, South Africa. It is located in Region F of the City of Johannesburg Metropolitan Municipality. The street postal code is 2196.
