= Giraffas =

Brazilian fast-food restaurant chain

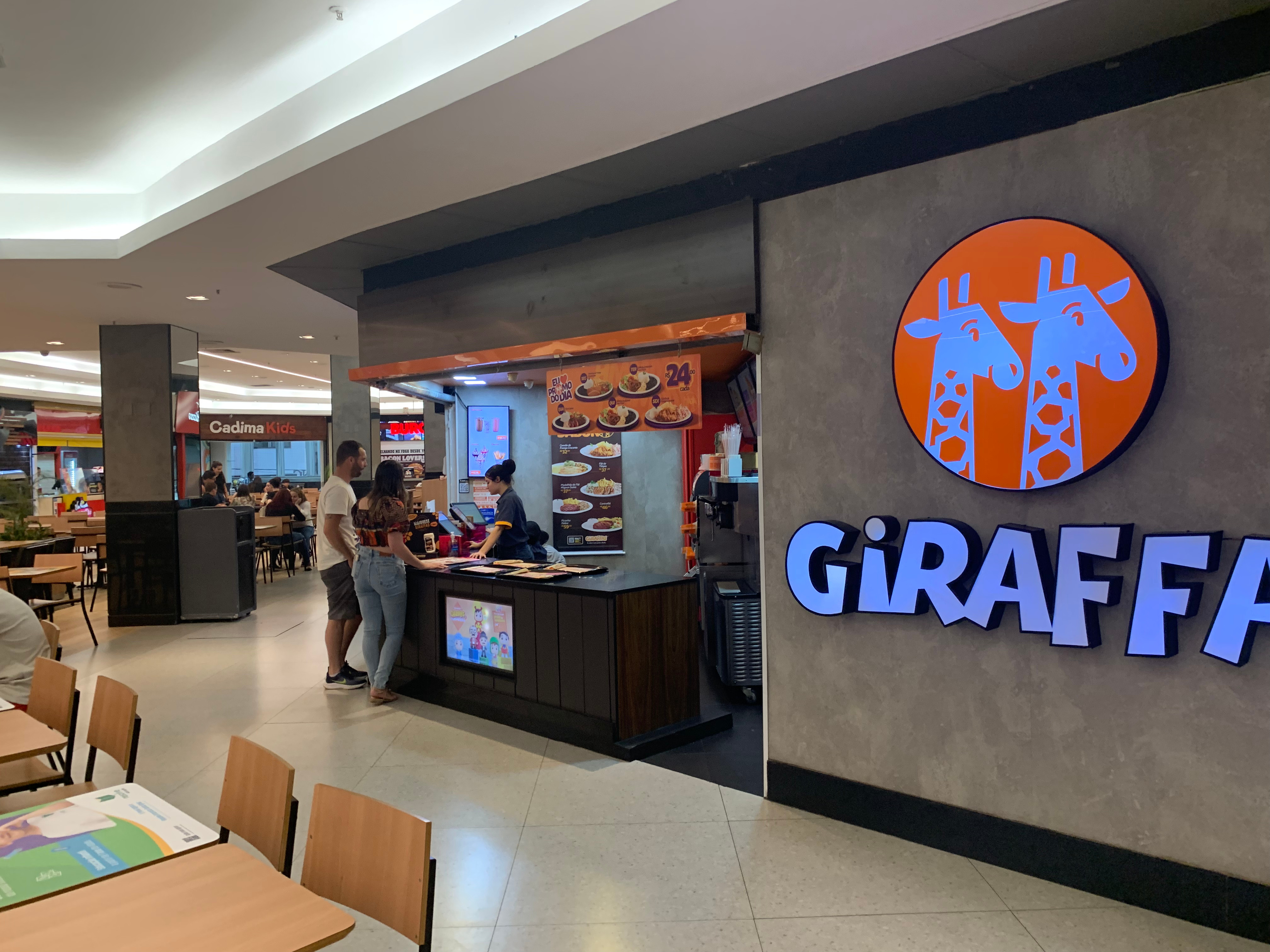
- Giraffas in Nova Friburgo, in Cadima Shopping.
- Trade name: Giraffas
- Type: Private
- Industry: Restaurants
- Founded: April 1981; 45 years ago
- Founder: Mauro Lacerda, Muniz Neto
- Headquarters: Lago Sul, DF, Brazil
- Number of locations: 400+ stores in Brazil, 10 stores in the United States and 1 store in Paraguay
- Area served: Brazil, United States, Paraguay
- Key people: Carlos Guerra
- Products: Fast food, including: Brazilian food · sandwiches
- Website: www.giraffas.com.br

Giraffas (Portuguese pronunciation: [ʒiˈɾafɐs]) is a Brazilian fast-food chain founded in April 1981 by two friends, Mauro Lacerda and Muniz Neto. Its first store is located in Lago Sul, in the Federal District. In 1991, the chain began franchising, and it has since expanded across Brazil. It has also opened in Paraguay and in Miami in the United States.

== History ==
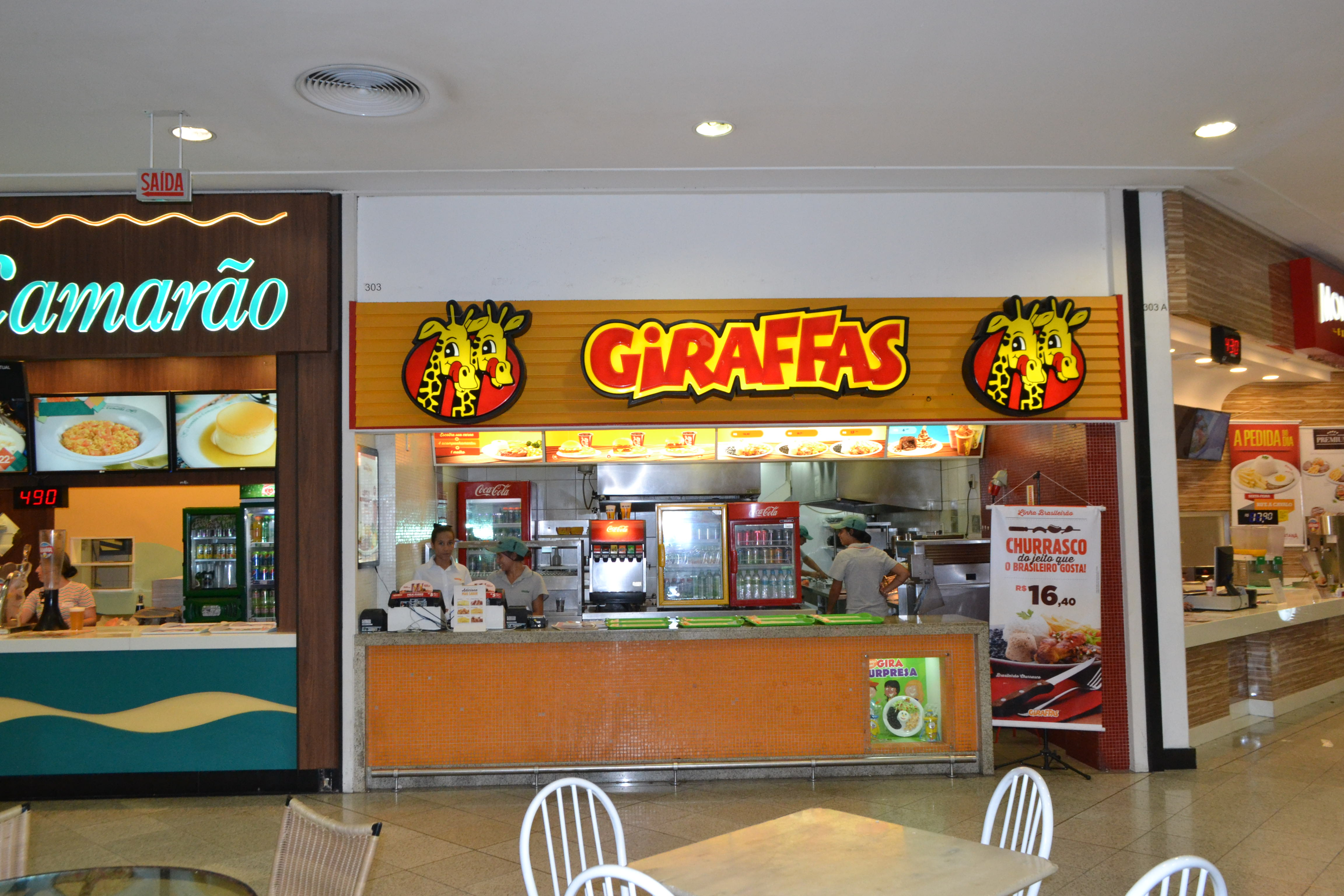
A Giraffas in a shopping mall

The company experienced difficulties after the implementation of the Real Plan. With the fall in inflation, earnings decreased and the model used by the partners proved to be unviable soon, as the company went into receivership. In 1996, due to financial crisis, the chain was sold to three friends of the owners: Felipe Barreto, Luciana Morais e Luciana Vasconcelos. The trio, completely inexperienced in the business, invested in the franchise system to grow and in 1998 undid the ten unique shops in possession of the company inherited from the former administration.

In 2002, the chain had the highest growth proportional in the national segment, and in 2003 the chain achieved 21% growth, opening the first stores in the states of Espírito Santo and Paraná. In 2004 and 2005, the company's main focus was the diversification of products, including a Giraffas ice cream kiosk. In 2005 was opened the first store in the town of Barreiras, in Bahia.

In 2006, the chain celebrated 25 years with a festival of local rock bands in Brasília, called Giraffestival. At the same time the company reached the milestone of 200 stores throughout Brazil and inaugurated the first stores in Pará and Mato Grosso. In 2006 was also launched the Trio RBD, a special offer with gifts from the Mexican band RBD. In 2007, the first Tocantins location was opened.

Giraffas opened its first international store in Miami, United States. Giraffas plans to open five stores in the country by 2011 and fifty stores in ten years. In addition to this store in the United States that premiered in 2010, Giraffas invested in a new international store in Ciudad del Este, Paraguay, which debuted in 2011. In Brazil the chain is now compared with other major fast-food chains like McDonald's and Burger King.

== See also ==
- List of hamburger restaurants
