= Ahmad Fawzi =

Egyptian press director

Ahmad Fawzi is an Egyptian-born media spokesperson, who, for six months in July 2017, worked as Communication Adviser and Chief Spokesperson for the High Commissioner for Refugees. In 2015–2016 he served as interim Director of the United Nations Information Service in Geneva.

He has held senior positions in the United Nations and global media outlets around the world. Since 1992, he has managed crisis communications and served as the interface between the UN and the global media in conflict areas and during highly charged political negotiations. His work involves communicating the broad range of UN activities to the global media and public and, in countries in and emerging from conflict, including Afghanistan, Libya, Iraq and Timor Leste, promoting free, independent and pluralistic media.

== United Nations ==
Fawzi has worked for three UN Secretaries-General: Boutros Boutros-Ghali, Kofi Annan and Ban Ki-moon, and served as spokesperson and communication chief for leading peace negotiators including Kofi Annan, Lakhdar Brahimi, Jan Eliasson, Ian Martin and Sergio Vieira de Mello. He first joined the Organization as Deputy Spokesperson for Secretary-General Boutros Boutros-Ghali, and was later appointed by Secretary-General Kofi Annan as director of the UN's information office in London (1997–2003). He served as chief of the Department of Public Information's News and Media Division, managing the UN's multilingual daily news and media products from 2003 to 2010.

== Peacekeeping, peacebuilding and political missions ==
Fawzi has had numerous UN assignments in countries in and emerging from conflict, and during high-level peace and nation-building negotiations, including in Afghanistan, Iraq, Timor Leste and throughout the Middle East.

During 2012, he was communication advisor and spokesperson for to two successive envoys working to end the conflict in Syria: former UN Secretary-General Kofi Annan, and later senior diplomat Lakhdar Brahimi, as part of the Joint United Nations and League of Arab States mission.

During the international efforts to resolve the conflict in Darfur, Sudan, Fawzi was spokesperson for the United Nations-African Union mediation team, headed by Jan Eliasson, that brought the parties together in Sirte, Libya, for face-to-face talks in 2007.

When Secretary-General Annan went to Baghdad in 1998 in a last-ditch effort to convince Iraqi President Saddam Hussein to open his palaces to UN weapons inspectors and avert a military strike, Fawzi was sent in advance to manage the intense media spotlight on the ground, and during the visit worked with the Spokesperson for the Secretary-General at the time, Fred Eckhard.
