= Wayback Burgers =

American fast casual restaurant chain

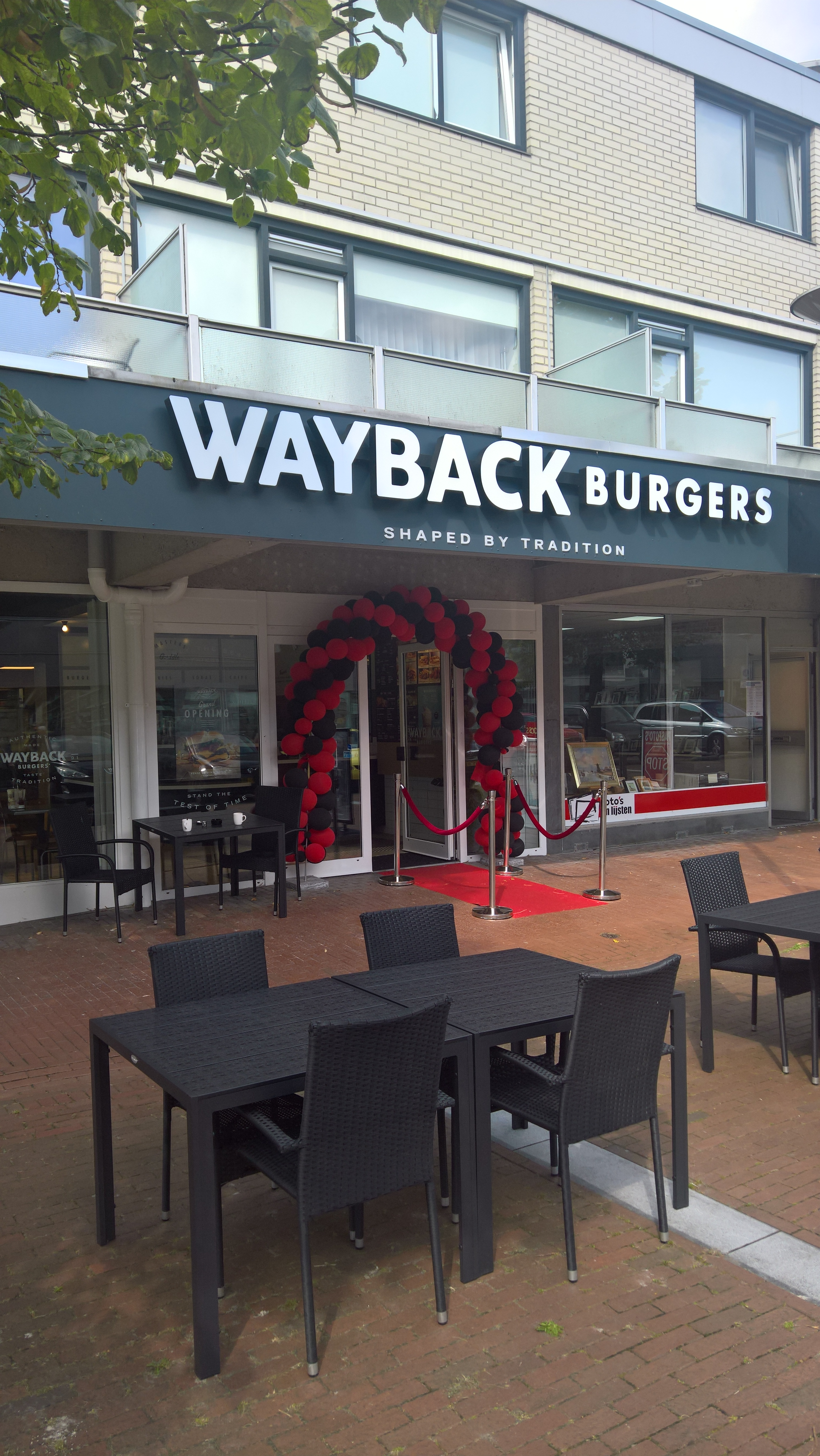
- Wayback Burgers, Winschoten, Netherlands
- Formerly: Jake's Hamburgers (1991-2010); Jake's Wayback Burgers (2010-2014)
- Company type: Private
- Industry: Fast Casual Restaurant
- Founded: 1991; 34 years ago (as Jake's Hamburgers); Newark, Delaware, U.S.
- Headquarters: Cheshire, Connecticut, U.S.
- Number of locations: 185
- Area served: United States; Dominican Repúblic; Canada; Brunei; United Arab Emirates; South Africa; Japan
- Key people: John Eucalitto (CEO); Patrick Conlin (President)
- Products: Burgers; chicken; fries; shakes
- Revenue: US$ 116.1 million (2020)
- Website: waybackburgers.com

Wayback Burgers, previously known as Jake's Wayback Burgers, is an American fast casual restaurant chain based in Cheshire, Connecticut. Wayback serves typical hamburger restaurant foods such as hamburgers, hot dogs, chicken sandwiches, milkshakes and salads, and a variety of regional selections. Created in Newark, Delaware, Wayback began expansion in the late 2000s; in 2013, it was announced that the chain was expanding internationally to an additional 28 countries, with locations in the Middle East and North Africa slated to open in early 2014. The second international agreement signed is with Argentina.

As of October 2016, 133 locations were in operation worldwide.

== History ==
The first Wayback Burgers location was opened in 1991 in Delaware under the name Jake's Hamburgers. Several more locations were opened, leading to the beginning of franchising in the early 2000s where the name was changed to Jake's Wayback Burgers in 2010. To date, the chain has expanded to 95 locations, with an additional 75 currently in development. They are spread throughout the United States, ranging from New England, New York, Florida, Texas, Ohio, and California. Wayback is similar to other 'better burger' brands such as Five Guys, Shake Shack, and Fuddruckers.

The first location in the state of Ohio was opened in Wadsworth in June 2011.

The first location in the state of Indiana was opened in Evansville in March 2012.

The 50th location was opened in Brooklyn, New York City in July 2012.

The first location in the state of New Hampshire was opened in Salem in August 2012.

The first location in the state of South Carolina was opened in Spartanburg in January 2013.

In August 2013, the first location in the state of Texas was opened in Waxahachie and the first location in the state of Minnesota was opened in Woodbury.

The first location in the state of Colorado was opened in Colorado Springs in November 2013.

During the summer of 2014, the chain announced the drop of "Jake's" from the title to deter confusion with a smaller competitor in the southern United States. Many locations will keep existing signage with the name "Jake's" on storefronts, but all new franchises will be known as "Wayback Burgers".

The first location in the state of Georgia was opened in Savannah in January 2015.

As part of a publicity stunt, Wayback offered milkshakes made with protein powder derived from crickets in June 2015 as part of a limited-time offer. As a bug-free alternative during the same promotional period, Wayback also offered a beef flavored shake that was garnished with a Slim Jim.

The first location in the state of Illinois was opened in Naperville in May 2016.

In 2016, Wayback Burgers investigated the possibility of an initial public offering but did not proceed further.

=== International expansion ===
The first location outside the United States was opened in Palermo, Buenos Aires, in Argentina in February 2015.

Nine months later, the first location in Saudi Arabia was opened in Al Khobar in November 2015 on the other side of the planet. This was the second location to open outside the United States.

The first location in the Southeast Asian country of Brunei was opened in the Setia Kenangan area in Kiulap in May 2016, making this the third location outside the United States.

In Europe, Wayback Burgers opened its first location in the city of Breda in the Netherlands, on December 1, 2018.

In Japan, Wayback Burgers opened its first location in Omotesando, Japan, on March 22, 2022. The company has plans to open 60 more locations in Japan over the next 20 years.
