= Maher Nasser =

Palestinian UN official

Director of the Outreach Division, Department of Global Communications, United Nations
- Incumbent
- Assumed office February 2011
- Secretary-General: Ban Ki-moon
- Preceded by: Eric Falt

Personal details
- Born: 19 October 1962 (age 63) al-Bireh, West Bank (now Palestine)

Maher Nasser is the Director of the Outreach Division in the United Nations Department of Global Communications. He was named Assistant Secretary General of the UN in March 2025. He oversees varied communication initiatives and campaigns along with a number of partners, and supervises the library and bookshop. He also serves as Chairman of the Publications Board. He plays a key role in promoting the role of the UN in the world.

== Early life and education ==
Nasser has a degree from Birzeit University in the West Bank, and a postgraduate degree in business administration from the University of Cambridge, in the United Kingdom. He is married with three children.

== Career ==
Nasser held different positions in two non-governmental organizations in Jerusalem before he joined the UN, gathering political support and money for the cause of Palestine and peace in the Middle East.

In October 1991, Nasser was a key leader at the Madrid Conference of 1991 and several sessions of subsequent bilateral negotiations in Washington, D.C., as head of the Palestinian negotiating team. His role has been pivotal in the initial and successful phases of the Middle East peace process.

From April to August 2012 and from August 2014 to February 2015, he was Acting Head of the Department of Public Information, at which times the Department excelled in its performance and was highly praised by the Secretary General and partners alike.

One of the longest serving veterans of the United Nations System; for more than 36 years, he has held various positions in Gaza, Jerusalem, Amman, Cairo, Vienna and New York City. Prior to his current post, Nasser was the Director of the United Nations Information Service (UNIS) in Vienna from July 2008. Prior to that, he served as Director of the United Nations Information Centre (UNIC) in Cairo, Egypt from January 2006, leading a number of campaign with the Egyptian leadership at delicate political times.

Nasser was the Chief of the New York Liaison Office for UNRWA before joining the Department of Public Information at the UN. He also held different posts within UNRWA in Vienna and Amman. He managed to raise large amounts of funding to help Palestinian refugees. He has also worked in the area of public information at the United Nations Drug Control Programme in Vienna (now UNODC), combating the drugs trade through policies and support to governments.

In 2024, United Nations Secretary-General António Guterres designated Nasser as Commissioner-General for the organization’s participation in Expo 2025 in Osaka.

== Publications ==
UN Chronicle: "It's never too late to start running"
