= TKZee =

South African music group

- Genre: Kwaito
- Years active: 1996–present
- Labels: Hola; Colossal
- Members: Zwai Bala: b. 15 February 1975; Tokollo 'Magesh' Tshabalala: 14 October 1976–15 August 2022 (aged 45); Kabelo Mabalane: b. 15 December 1976

TKZee is a South African kwaito music group formed in the 1990s by three school friends, Tokollo 'Magesh' Tshabalala, Kabelo Mabalane, and Zwai Bala. The group shot to prominence in late 1997 and early 1998 with their chart-topping singles "Palafala" and "Shibobo", respectively.

== History ==
Their 1996 debut EP, titled Take It Easy, did not sell well. In December 1997 the group released their second EP "Phalafala", sampling Joni Mitchell's "Big Yellow Taxi". The song became a hit, with the CD single selling over 100,000 units. The group's next big release was in the run-up to the 1998 FIFA World Cup. In collaboration with then Bafana Bafana and Ajax striker Benni McCarthy, the group produced their third EP, Shibobo, in June 1998. The song, which contained samples of Europe's "The Final Countdown", featured McCarthy rapping on some of the lyrics, and was an instant success. Sales topped the 100 000 mark in just over a month, a feat which made Shibobo the fastest and biggest selling CD single by a South African recording artist in history. They quickly became household names not just in South Africa but across the continent.

In 1998, they released their first full album, Halloween, which became a huge hit with smash singles "Dlala Mapansula", "Mambotjie" and "We Love This Place". The album was certified Platinum by the Recording industry of South Africa (RISA), with over 200 000 copies sold and four South African Music Awards (SAMA) for Best Kwaito Album, Best Duo/Group, Best Single and Best Kwaito Single. In 1999 they produced Guz 2001, a compilation album by TKZee Family, consisting of the original TKZee members alongside other names on their record label TKZ Wrekords, including Gwyza, Loyiso, 2 Shot, Dr Mageu, Kutlwano Masote and Moses Taiwa Molelekwa. The compilation was a commercial success as it sold over 150 000 copies.

In 2008, after an eight-year hiatus, the group reunited, touring around the country and around the world in countries like Denmark. The following year Tkzee released their third album titled Coming Home with the singles "Sdudla" and "Dikakapa". They performed their hit single "Shibobo" at the opening ceremony of the 2010 FIFA World Cup at Soccer City (FNB stadium) in Johannesburg.

On 15 August 2022, Tokollo Tshabalala died. According to a press statement released by his family, the musician died from an epileptic seizure which resulted from a severe brain injury he had sustained in a 2001 car accident. He was 45.

== Discography ==
=== Singles ===
- "Take It Easy" (1996)
- "Phalafala" (1997)
- "Masimbela" (1997)
- "Shibobo" (1998)
- "Dlala Mapansula" (1998)
- "Mambotjie/We Love This Place" (1999)
- "Fiasco" (1999)
- "Fella Kae" (1999)
- "Izinja Zam" (2000)
- "Ibola lethu" (2002)
- "S'dudla" (2009)
- "Dikakapa" (2010)
- “Viva La Pantsula” (2010)

=== Albums/EPs ===
- 1996: Take It Easy
- 1997: Phalafala
- 1998: Shibobo
- 1998: Halloween
- 1999: Guz 2001 (TKZee Family)
- 2001: Trinity
- 2004: Guz Hits
- 2009: Coming Home

== Awards and nominations ==
Year	Award	Category	Results	Ref.
1999	5th SAMA	Best Kwaito Album	Won	
1999	5th SAMA	Best Duo/Group	Won	
1999	5th SAMA	Best Single	Won	
1999	5th SAMA	Best Kwaito Single	Won	
2019	25th SAMA	Lifetime Achievement Award	Won	
