= Pretoria =

Executive capital of South Africa

Pretoria Pitori (SeTswana/SePedi/SeSotho) iPitoli (Zulu) ePitoli (Swati)
- Capital city (executive branch)
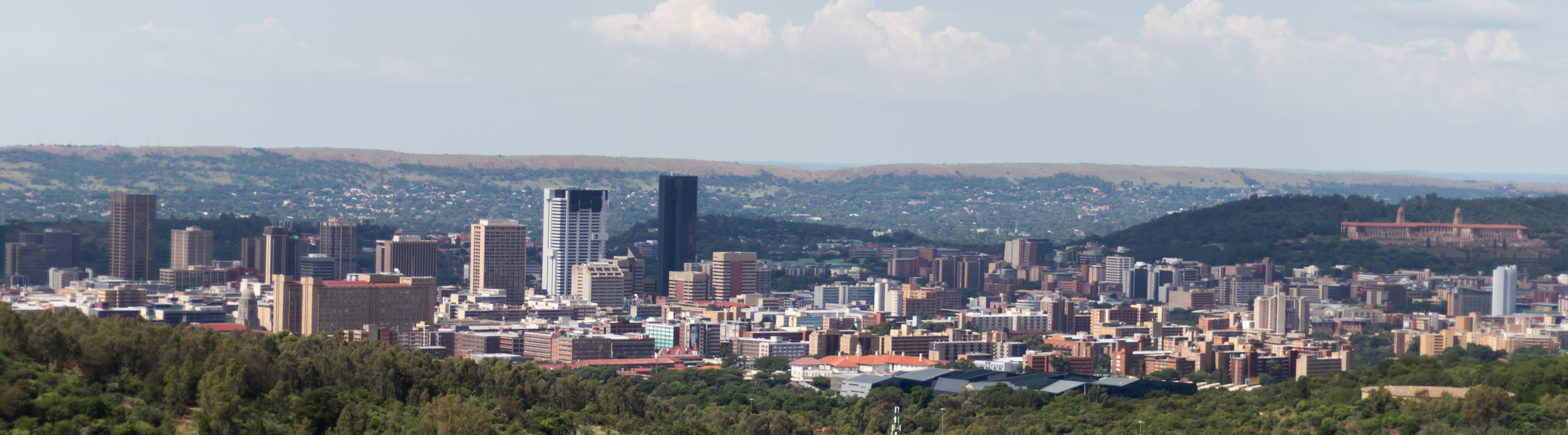
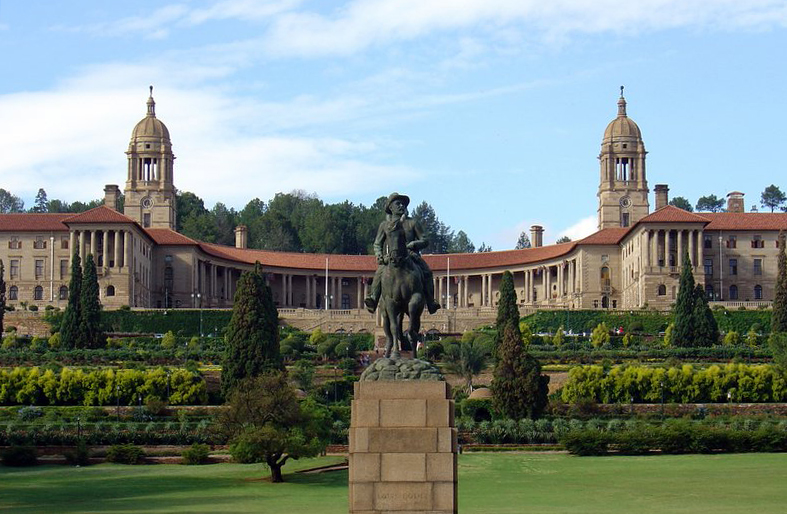
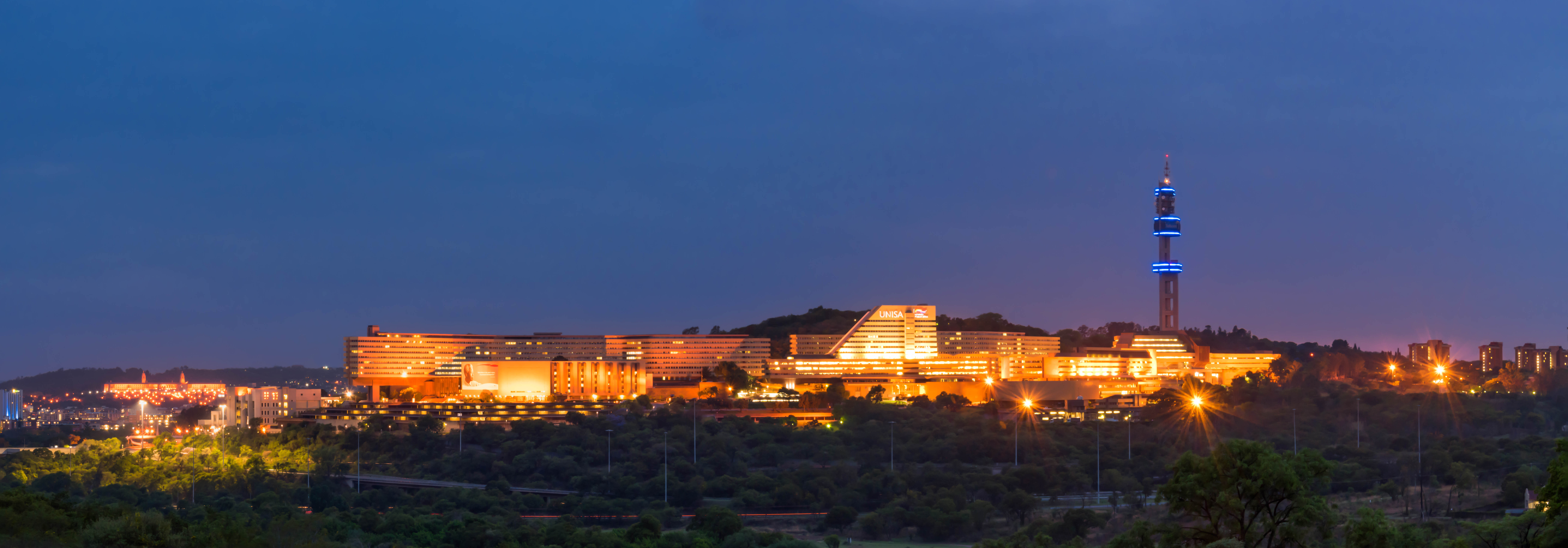
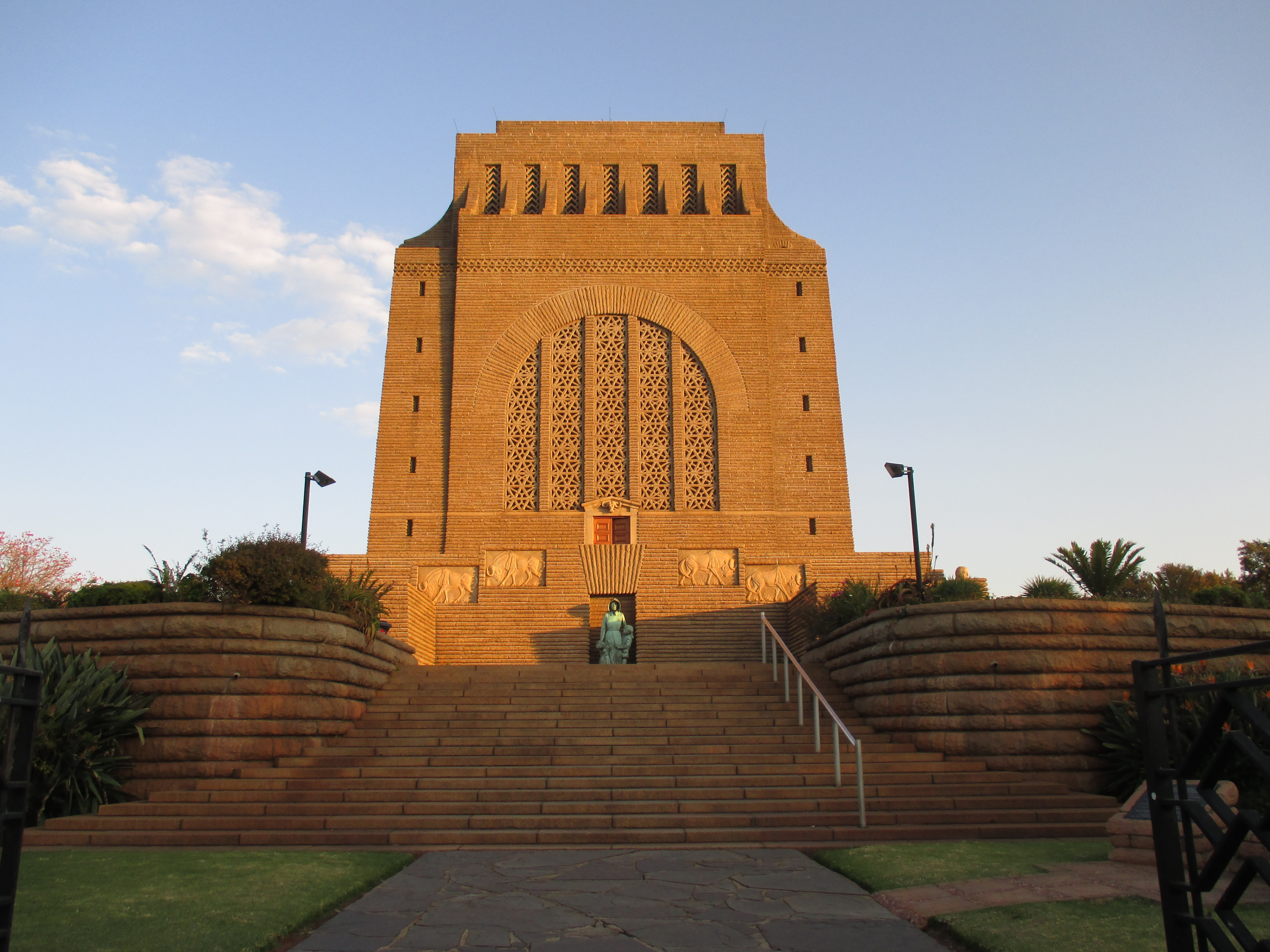
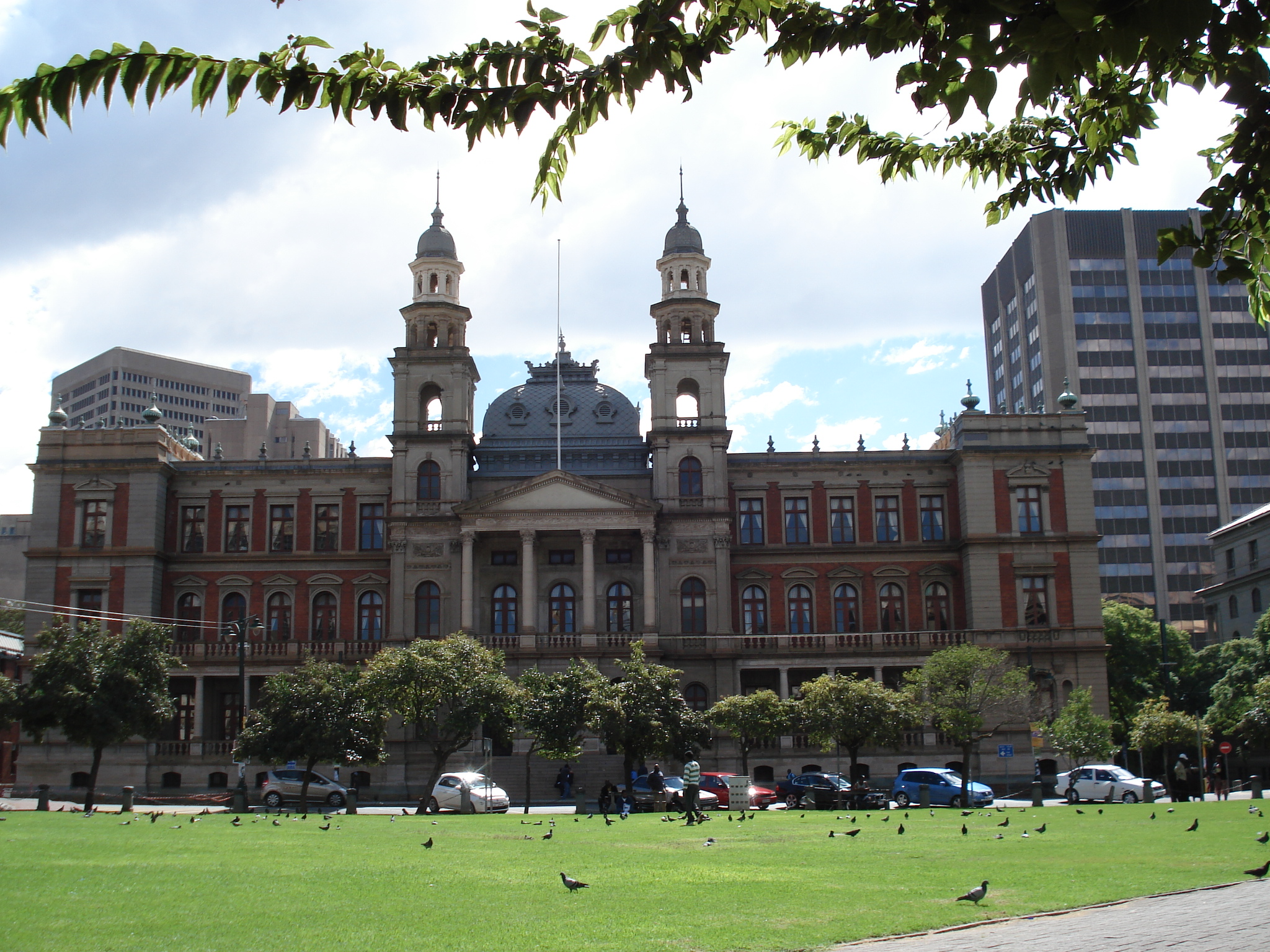
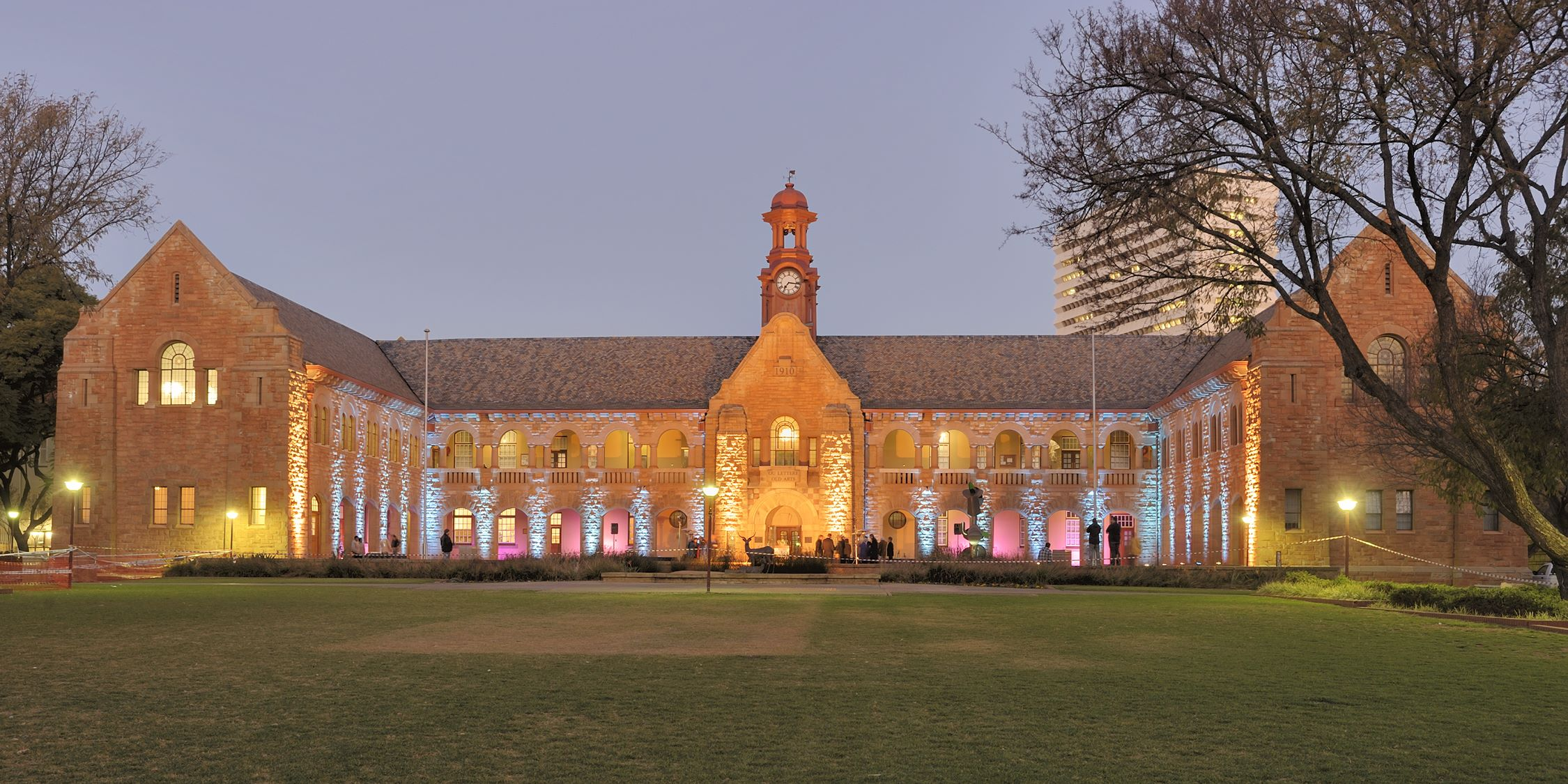
- Top: View of Pretoria from the Voortrekker Monument; Second row: Union Buildings; Third row: UNISA Muckleneuk campus; Fourth row (Left to Right): Voortrekker Monument and Palace of Justice; Bottom: Old Arts Building, University of Pretoria.

- Flag Coat of arms
- Nicknames: Jacaranda City, 012, Pirara, PTA
- Motto: Præstantia Prævaleat Prætoria ("May Pretoria be pre-eminent in excellence")
- Location in South Africa Pretoria (South Africa) Pretoria (Africa)
- Coordinates: 25°44′46″S 28°11′17″E
- Country: South Africa
- Province: Gauteng
- Municipality: City of Tshwane
- Established: 18 November 1855
- Founder: Marthinus Wessel Pretorius
- Named for: Andries Pretorius

Government
  - Type: Metropolitan municipality
  - Executive Mayor: Nasiphi Moya (ActionSA)

Area
  - Capital city (executive branch): 687.54 km^{2} (265.46 sq mi)
  - Metro: 6,297.83 km^{2} (2,431.61 sq mi)
- Elevation: 1,339 m (4,393 ft)

Population (2011)
  - Capital city (executive branch): 741,651
  - Estimate (2026): 3,296,921
  - Rank: 34th in Africa; 4th in South Africa
  - Density: 1,078.7/km^{2} (2,793.8/sq mi)
  - Urban: 1,836,166
  - Metro: 3,015,000
  - Metro density: 478.7/km^{2} (1,240/sq mi)
- Demonym: Pretorian

Racial makeup (2011)
  - White: 52.45%
  - Black: 41.95%
  - Coloured: 2.50%
  - Indian/Asian: 1.93%
  - Other: 1.17%

First languages (2011)
  - Afrikaans: 47.67%
  - English: 16.38%
  - Sepedi: 8.02%
  - Tswana: 5.44%
- Time zone: UTC+2 (SAST)
- Area code: 012
- GDP: US$75.6 billion
- GDP per capita: US$23,108
- HDI: ▲0.75 High (2012)
- Website: www.tshwane.gov.za

Pretoria (/prɪˈtɔːriə, pri-/ prih-TOR-ee-ə, pree-; Afrikaans: [prəˈtʉəria]) is the executive capital of South Africa, serving as the seat of the executive branch of government, and as the host to all foreign embassies to the country.

Pretoria straddles the Apies River and extends westward into the foothills of the Magaliesberg mountains. It has a reputation as an academic city and centre of research, being home to the Tshwane University of Technology (TUT), the University of Pretoria (UP), the University of South Africa (UNISA), the Council for Scientific and Industrial Research (CSIR), and the Human Sciences Research Council. It also hosts the National Research Foundation and the South African Bureau of Standards. Pretoria was one of the host cities of the 2010 FIFA World Cup.

As the administrative capital of the country, Pretoria hosts the headquarters of all national government departments and agencies. The city is also a major global diplomatic hub; it is home to 134 foreign embassies and high commissions, representing the second-largest concentration of diplomatic missions in the world, surpassed only by Washington, D.C.

Pretoria is the central part of the City of Tshwane Metropolitan Municipality which was formed by the amalgamation of several former local authorities, including Bronkhorstspruit, Centurion, Cullinan, Hammanskraal and Soshanguve. Some have proposed changing the official name from Pretoria to Tshwane, which has caused some public controversy.

Pretoria is named after the Voortrekker leader Andries Pretorius, and South Africans sometimes call it the "Jacaranda City", because of the thousands of jacaranda trees planted along its streets and in its parks and gardens.

== History ==
Pretoria was founded in 1855 by Marthinus Pretorius, a leader of the Voortrekkers, who named it after his father Andries Pretorius and chose a spot on the banks of the Apies rivier (Afrikaans for "Monkeys river") to be the new capital of the South African Republic (Dutch: Zuid Afrikaansche Republiek; ZAR). The elder Pretorius had become a national hero of the Voortrekkers after his victory over Dingane and the Zulus in the Battle of Blood River in 1838. The elder Pretorius also negotiated the Sand River Convention (1852), in which the United Kingdom acknowledged the independence of the Transvaal. It became the capital of the South African Republic on 1 May 1860.

The founding of Pretoria as the capital of the South African Republic can be seen as marking the end of the Boers' settlement movements of the Great Trek.

=== Boer Wars ===
During the First Boer War, the city was besieged by Republican forces in December 1880 and March 1881. The peace treaty that ended the war was signed in Pretoria on 3 August 1881 at the Pretoria Convention.

The Second Boer War resulted in the end of the Transvaal Republic and start of British hegemony in South Africa. The city surrendered to British forces under Frederick Roberts on 5 June 1900 and the conflict was ended in Pretoria with the signing of the Peace of Vereeniging on 31 May 1902 at Melrose House.

The Pretoria Forts were built for the defence of the city just prior to the Second Boer War. Though some of these forts are today in ruins, a number of them have been preserved as national monuments.

=== Union of South Africa ===
The Boer Republics of the ZAR and the Orange River Colony were united with the Cape Colony and Natal Colony in 1910 to become the Union of South Africa. Pretoria then became the administrative capital of the whole of South Africa, with Cape Town serving as the legislative capital and Bloemfontein as the judicial capital. Between 1910 and 1994, the city was also the capital of the province of Transvaal. (As the capital of the ZAR, Pretoria had superseded Potchefstroom in that role.) On 14 October 1931, Pretoria achieved official city status. When South Africa became a republic in 1961, Pretoria remained its administrative capital.

== Geography ==
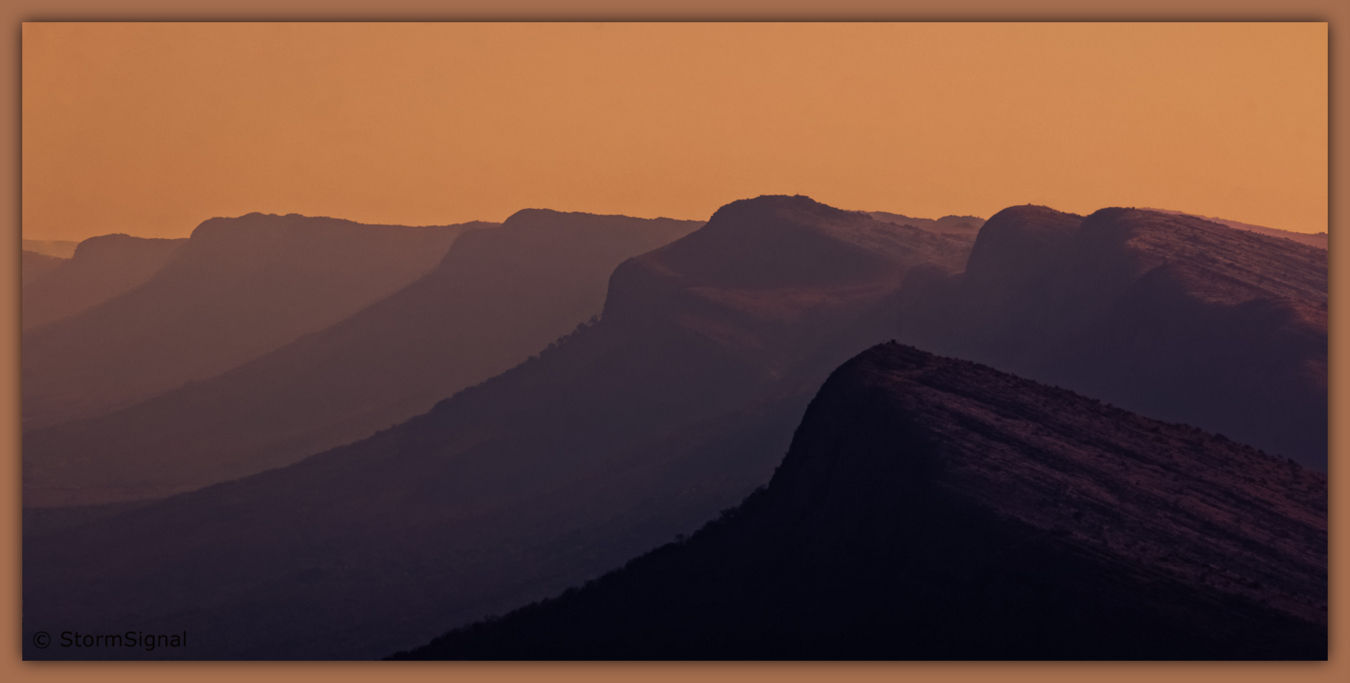
Magaliesberg mountain range

Pretoria is situated approximately 56 km (35 mi) north-northeast of Johannesburg in the northeast of South Africa, in a transitional belt between the plateau of the Highveld to the south and the lower-lying Bushveld to the north. It lies at an altitude of about 1,339 m (4,393 ft) above sea level, in a warm, sheltered, fertile valley, surrounded by the hills of the Magaliesberg range.

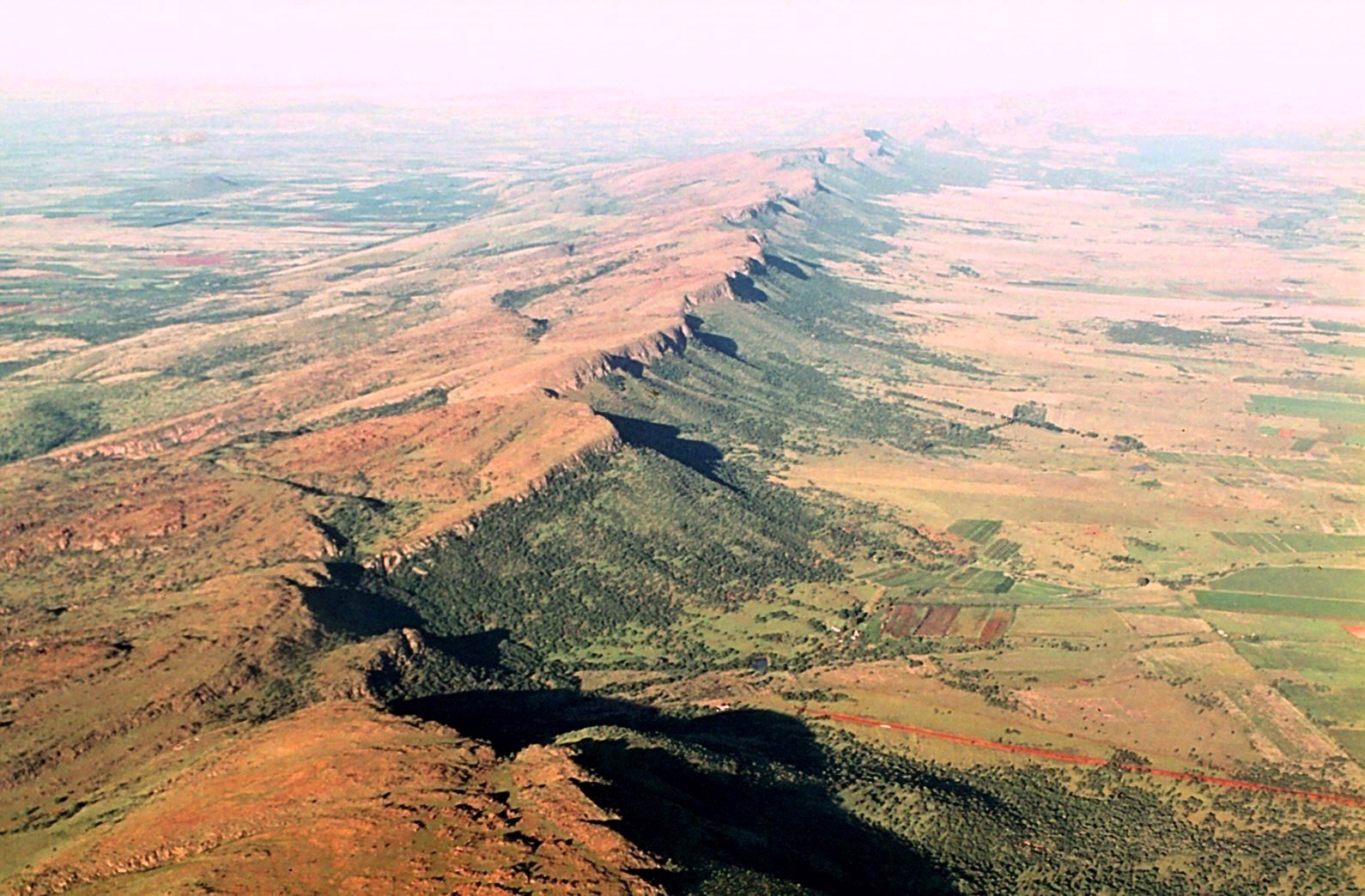
The city is surrounded by the Magaliesberg range.

=== Climate ===
Pretoria has a monsoon-influenced humid subtropical climate (Köppen: Cwa) with long hot, rainy summers, and short, dry and mild winters. The city experiences the typical winters of South Africa, with cold, clear nights and mild to moderately warm days. Although the average lows during winter are mild, it can get cold due to the clear skies, with night time low temperatures in recent years in the range of 2 to −5 °C (36 to 23 °F).

The average annual temperature is 18.7 °C (65.7 °F). This is rather high, considering the city's relatively high altitude of about 1,339 metres (4,393 feet), and is due mainly to its sheltered valley position, which acts as a heat trap and cuts it off from cool southerly and south-easterly air masses for much of the year.

Rain is chiefly concentrated in the summer months, with drought conditions prevailing over the winter months, when frosts may be sharp. Snowfall is an extremely rare event; snowflakes were spotted in 1959, 1968 and 2012 in the city, but the city has never experienced an accumulation in its history.

During a nationwide heat wave in November 2011, Pretoria experienced temperatures that reached 39 °C (102 °F), unusual for that time of the year. Similar record-breaking extreme heat events also occurred in January 2013, when Pretoria experienced temperatures exceeding 37 °C (99 °F) on several days. The year 2014 was one of the wettest on record for the city. A total of 914 mm (36 in) fell up to the end of December, with 220 mm (9 in) recorded in this month alone. In 2015, Pretoria saw its worst drought since 1982; the month of November 2015 saw new records broken for high temperatures, with 43 °C (109 °F) recorded on 11 November after three weeks of temperatures between 35 °C (95 °F) and 43 °C (109 °F). Pretoria reached a new record high of 42.7 °C (108.9 °F) on 7 January 2016.

Climate data for Pretoria, elevation 1,308 m (4,291 ft), (1991–2020 normals, extremes 1951–1990)
Month	Jan	Feb	Mar	Apr	May	Jun	Jul	Aug	Sep	Oct	Nov	Dec	Year
Record high °C (°F)	36.2 (97.2)	36.3 (97.3)	35.0 (95.0)	32.5 (90.5)	30.3 (86.5)	26.0 (78.8)	26.0 (78.8)	30.0 (86.0)	34.0 (93.2)	36.0 (96.8)	35.7 (96.3)	36.0 (96.8)	36.3 (97.3)
Mean daily maximum °C (°F)	29.0 (84.2)	29.1 (84.4)	27.7 (81.9)	25.0 (77.0)	22.7 (72.9)	20.7 (69.3)	20.5 (68.9)	23.6 (74.5)	27.2 (81.0)	28.6 (83.5)	28.7 (83.7)	28.8 (83.8)	26.0 (78.8)
Daily mean °C (°F)	23.2 (73.8)	23.2 (73.8)	21.8 (71.2)	18.7 (65.7)	15.2 (59.4)	12.2 (54.0)	11.9 (53.4)	15.4 (59.7)	19.7 (67.5)	21.4 (70.5)	22.1 (71.8)	22.7 (72.9)	19.0 (66.1)
Mean daily minimum °C (°F)	18.0 (64.4)	17.9 (64.2)	16.5 (61.7)	13.0 (55.4)	8.0 (46.4)	5.0 (41.0)	4.6 (40.3)	8.0 (46.4)	12.0 (53.6)	15.0 (59.0)	16.5 (61.7)	17.3 (63.1)	12.3 (54.1)
Record low °C (°F)	7.5 (45.5)	10.4 (50.7)	5.5 (41.9)	3.3 (37.9)	−1.5 (29.3)	−4.5 (23.9)	−4.5 (23.9)	−4.0 (24.8)	−0.5 (31.1)	3.0 (37.4)	6.6 (43.9)	6.5 (43.7)	−4.5 (23.9)
Average precipitation mm (inches)	118.5 (4.67)	109.5 (4.31)	81.4 (3.20)	32.5 (1.28)	15.4 (0.61)	5.8 (0.23)	0.6 (0.02)	4.2 (0.17)	17.1 (0.67)	63.9 (2.52)	98.0 (3.86)	115.2 (4.54)	662.1 (26.08)
Average precipitation days (≥ 1.0 mm)	10.2	8.3	6.8	4.0	1.7	1.1	0.2	0.7	1.8	6.2	9.2	10.6	60.8
Average relative humidity (%)	62	63	63	63	56	54	50	45	44	52	59	61	56
Mean monthly sunshine hours	260.8	235.3	253.9	245.8	282.6	270.8	289.1	295.5	284.3	275.2	253.6	271.9	3,218.8
Source 1: NOAA (sun and humidity 1961−1990) Deutscher Wetterdienst (extremes)Starlings Roost Weather
Source 2: South African Weather Service

== Demographics ==
Historical population
Year	Pop.	±%
1946	244,496	—
1950	275,331	+12.6%
1956	354,403	+28.7%
1961	432,973	+22.2%
1966	502,443	+16.0%
1971	576,319	+14.7%
1976	635,932	+10.3%
1981	701,672	+10.3%
1986	790,661	+12.7%
1991	935,107	+18.3%
1996	955,025	+2.1%
2000	1,083,586	+13.5%
2004	1,276,546	+17.8%
2008	1,524,762	+19.4%
2011	1,742,006	+14.2%
2016	2,175,904	+24.9%
2018	2,472,000	+13.6%
2022	2,813,810	+13.8%

Population density in and around Pretoria <1 /km² 1–3 /km² 3–10 /km² 10–30 /km² 30–100 /km² 100–300 /km² 300–1000 /km² 1000–3000 /km² >3000 /km²

Geographical distribution of home languages in Pretoria Afrikaans English Ndebele Zulu Northern Sotho Tswana Tsonga None dominant

Depending on the extent of the area understood to constitute "Pretoria", the population ranges from 700,000 to 2.95 million. The main languages spoken in Pretoria are Sepedi, Setswana, Xitsonga, Tshivenda, Afrikaans, and English. The city of Pretoria has the largest white population in Africa. Since its founding, it has been a major Afrikaner population centre, and there are roughly 1 million Afrikaners living in or around the city.

First languages spoken in Pretoria (2011)
Rank	Language	Population	Percentage
1	Afrikaans	331,700	47.7%
2	English	113,957	16.4%
3	Sepedi	55,814	8.0%
4	Setswana	37,884	5.4%
5	isiZulu	25,827	3.7%
6	Sesotho	24,605	3.5%
7	Xitsonga	18,016	2.6%
8	Tshivenda	17,299	2.5%
9	isiXhosa	16,106	2.3%
10	isiNdebele	13,545	2.0%
11	siSwati	5,637	0.8%
12	Sign Language	1,346	0.2%
—	Other languages	34,115	4.9%
—	Not applicable	45,800	—
Total		741,651	100%

=== Ethnic groups ===
Even since the end of Apartheid, Pretoria itself has had a white majority, albeit with an ever-increasing black middle-class. However, in the townships of Mamelodi, Soshanguve and Atteridgeville black people make up close to all of the population. The largest white ethnic group are known as the Afrikaners and the largest black ethnic group are the Bapedi.

The lower estimate for the population of Pretoria includes largely former white-designated areas, and there is therefore a white majority. However, including the geographically separate townships increases Pretoria's population beyond a million and makes whites a minority.

Pretoria's Indians were ordered to move from Pretoria to Laudium on 6 June 1958.

Ethnic group	2001 (Main Place)		2011 (Main Place)		2022 (Metro Area)	
Ethnic group	Population	%	Population	%	Population	%
Black African	128,791	24.5%	311,149	42.0%	3,343,199	82.8%
White	314,678	67.7%	389,022	52.5%	541,114	13.4%
Coloured	32,727	6.2%	18,514	2.5%	72,007	1.8%
Indian or Asian	8,238	1.6%	14,298	1.9%	69,097	1.7%
Other	–	–	8,667	1.2%	12,487	0.3%
Total	525,387	100%	741,651	100%	4,037,904	100%

== Cityscape ==
Pretoria is known as the "Jacaranda City" due to the approximately 60,000-70,000 Jacarandas that line its streets. Purple is a colour often associated with the city and is often included on local council logos and services such as the A Re Yeng rapid bus system and the logo of the local Jacaranda FM radio station.

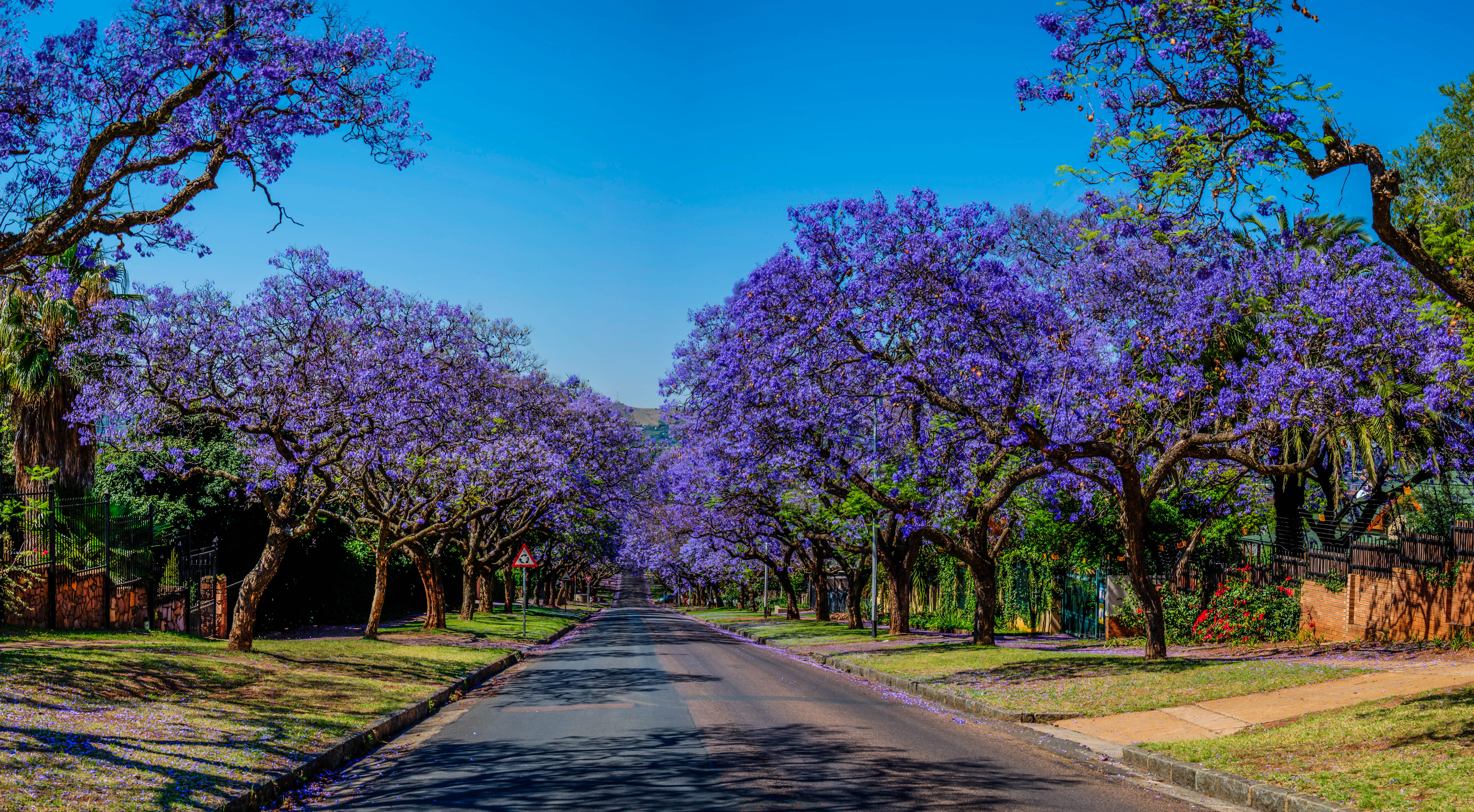
Jacaranda Trees which line the streets of Pretoria

=== Architecture ===
Media related to Buildings in Pretoria at Wikimedia Commons

Pretoria has over the years had very diverse cultural influences and this is reflected in the architectural styles that can be found in the city. It ranges from 19th century Dutch, German and British colonial architecture to modern, postmodern, neomodern, and art deco architecture styles with a mix of a uniquely South African style.

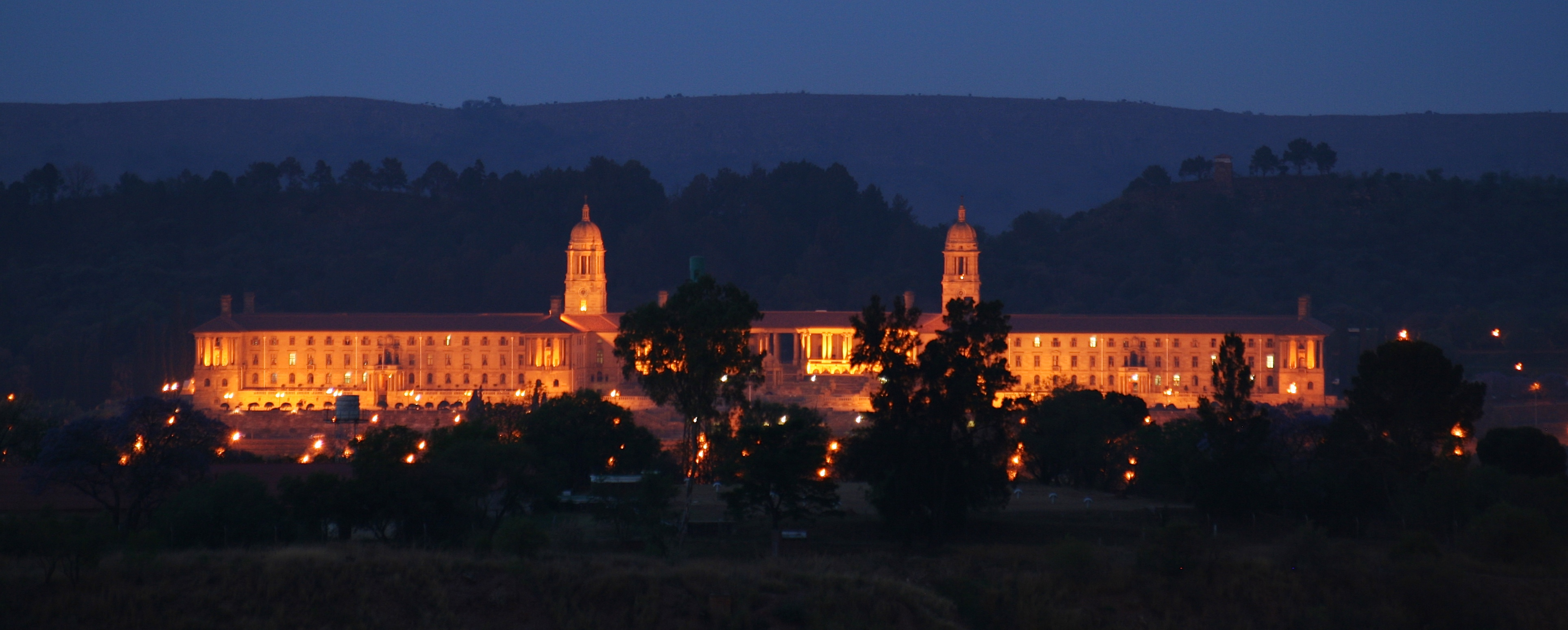
Pretoria's Union Buildings at night

Some of the notable structures in Pretoria include the late 19th century Palace of Justice, the early 20th century Union Buildings, the post-war Voortrekker Monument, the diverse buildings dotting the main campuses of both the University of Pretoria and the University of South Africa, traditional Cape Dutch style Mahlamba Ndlopfu (the President's House), the Neo-Byzantine Old Synagogue, the more modern Reserve Bank of South Africa (office skyscraper) and the Telkom Lukasrand Tower. Other well-known structures and buildings include the Loftus Versfeld Stadium, The South African State Theatre and the Oliver Tambo building which is the Headquarters of the Department of International Relations and Cooperation.

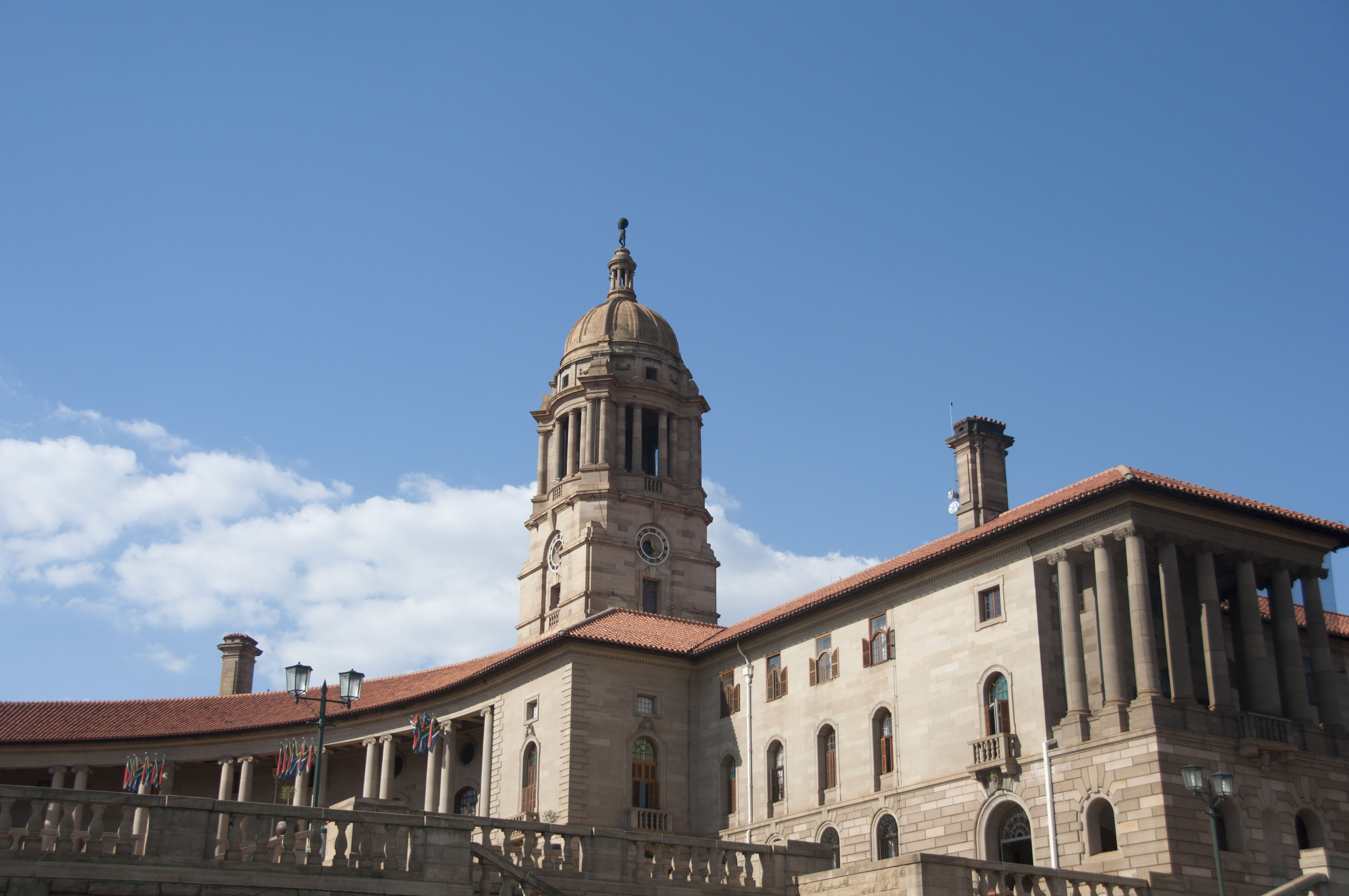
The Eastern Wing of the Union Buildings

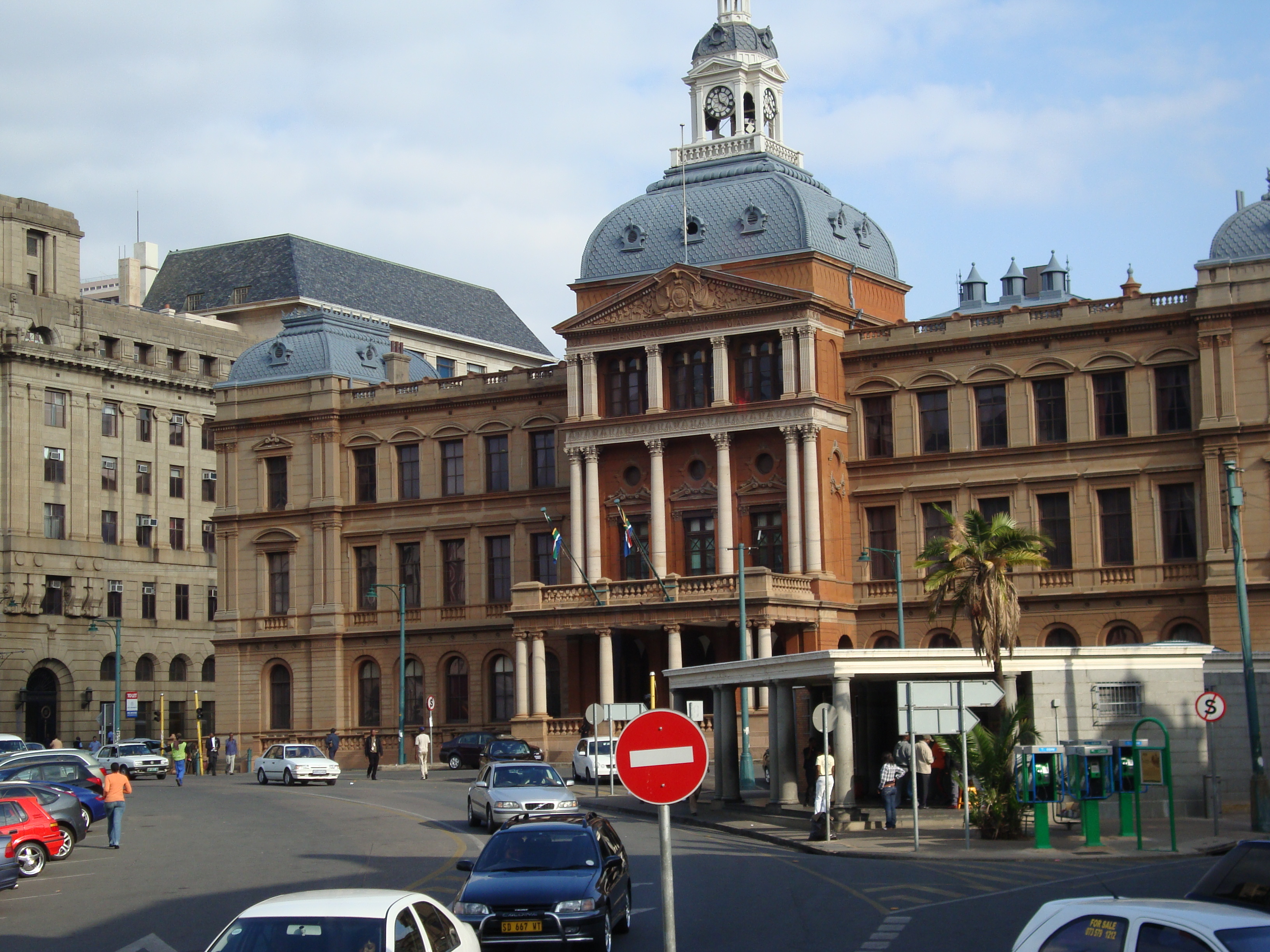
Old Council Chambers, or Ou Raadsaal

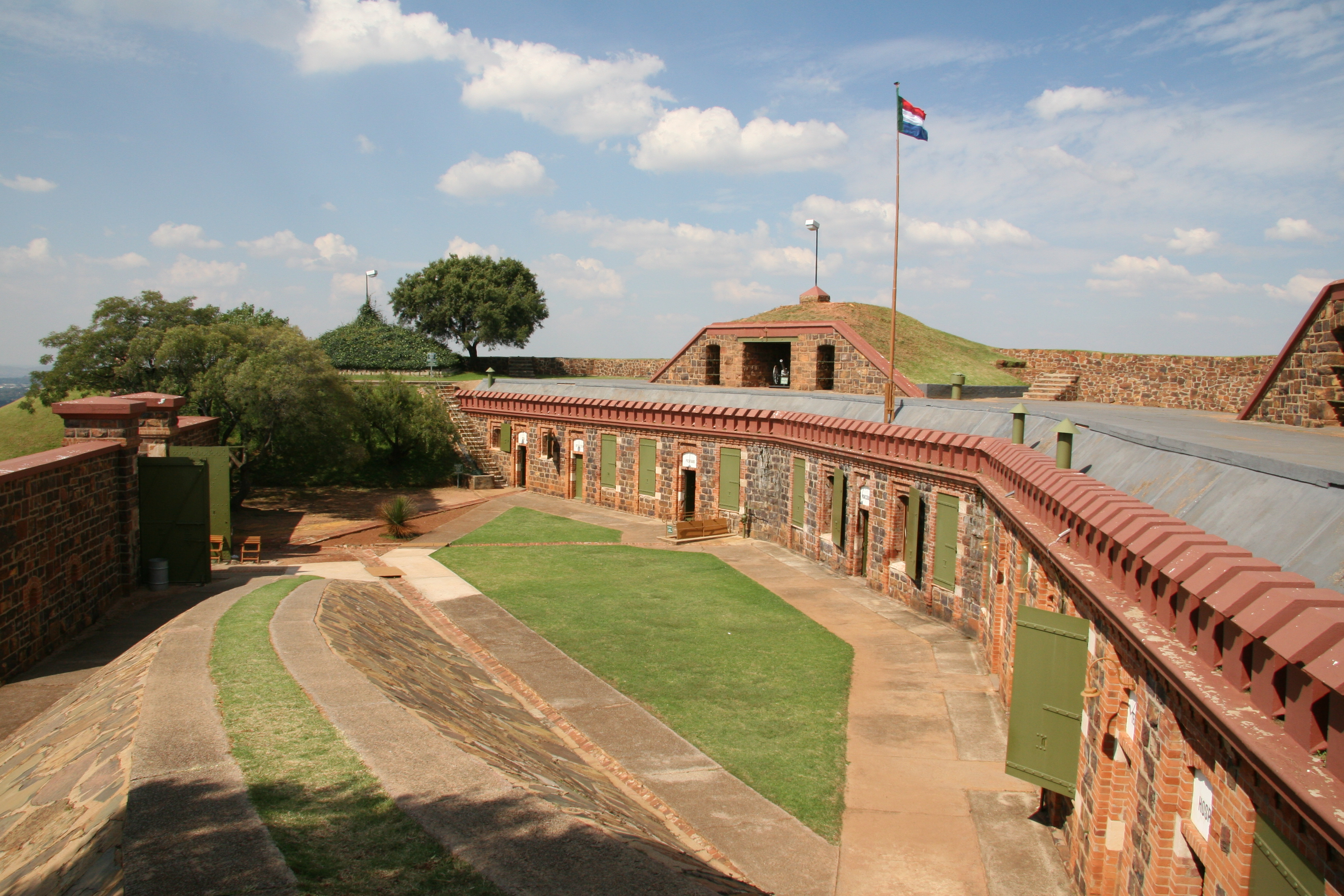
Fort Klapperkop

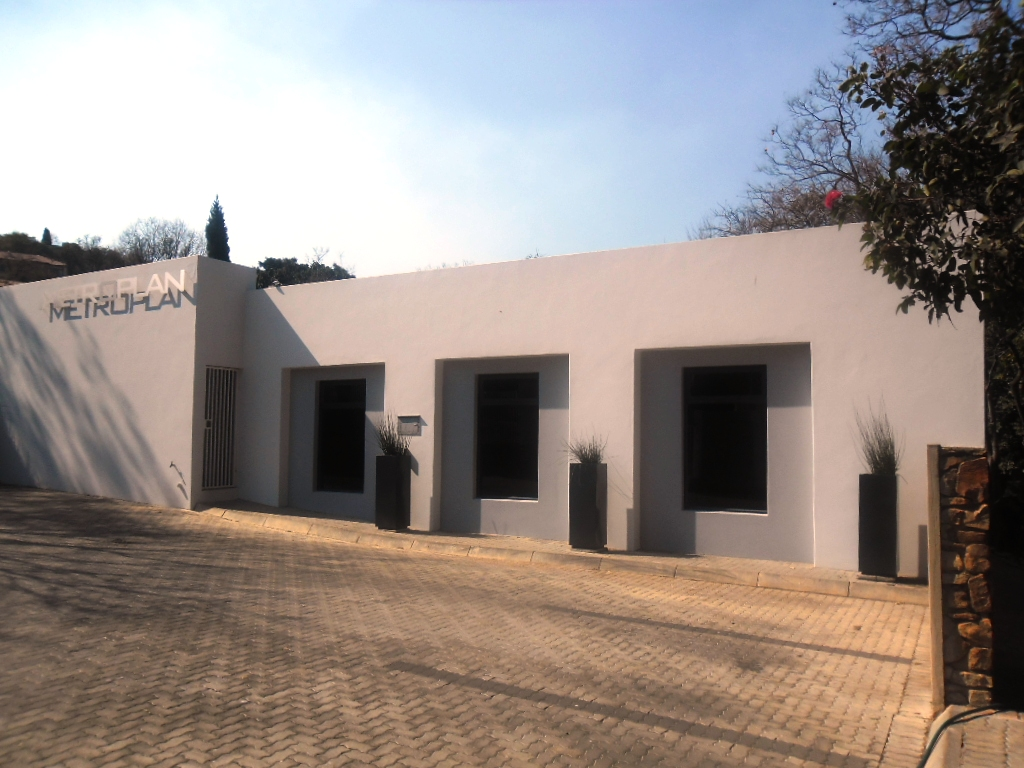
Neomodern architecture in Pretoria

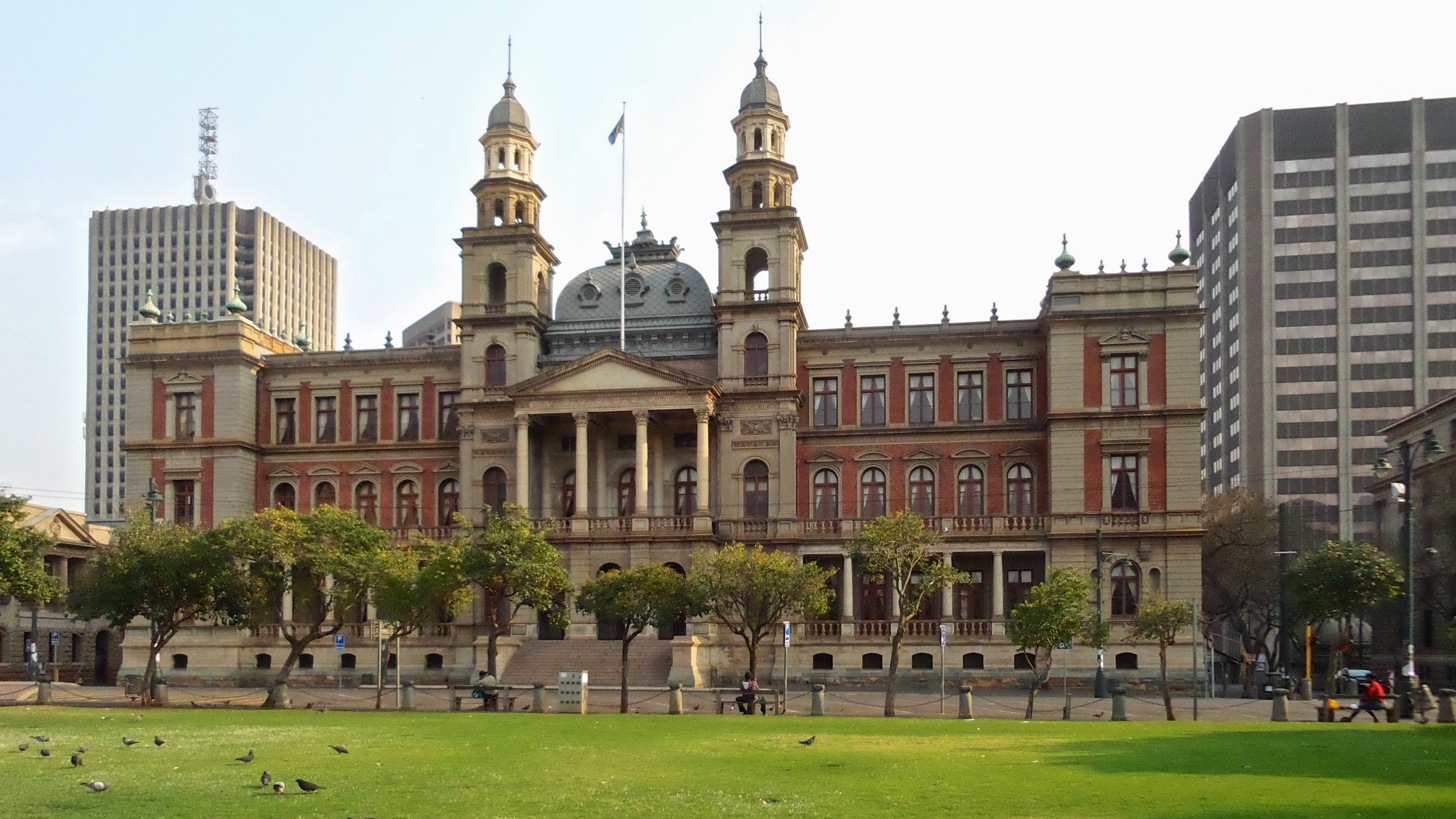
The Palace of Justice

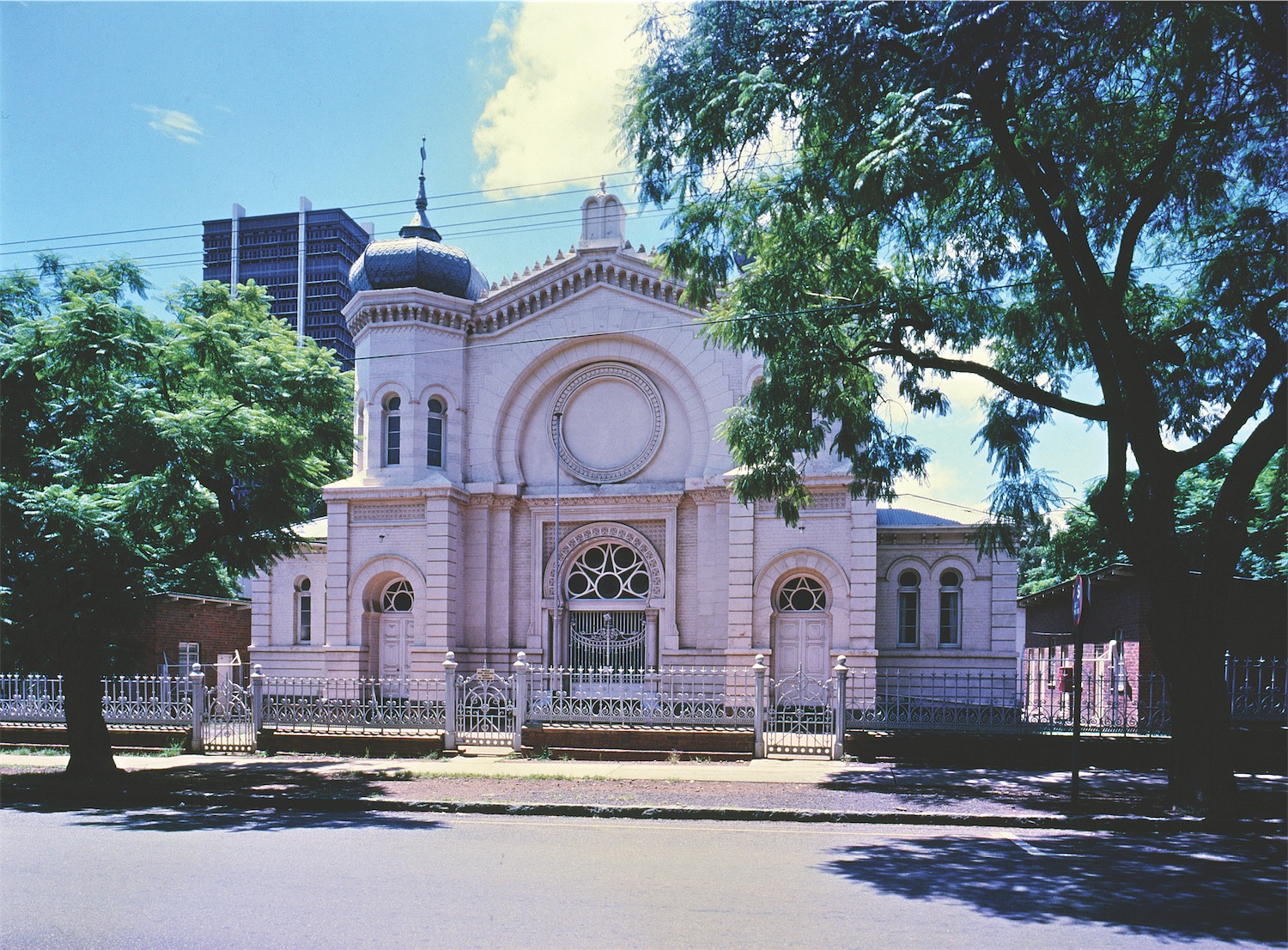
The Old Synagogue

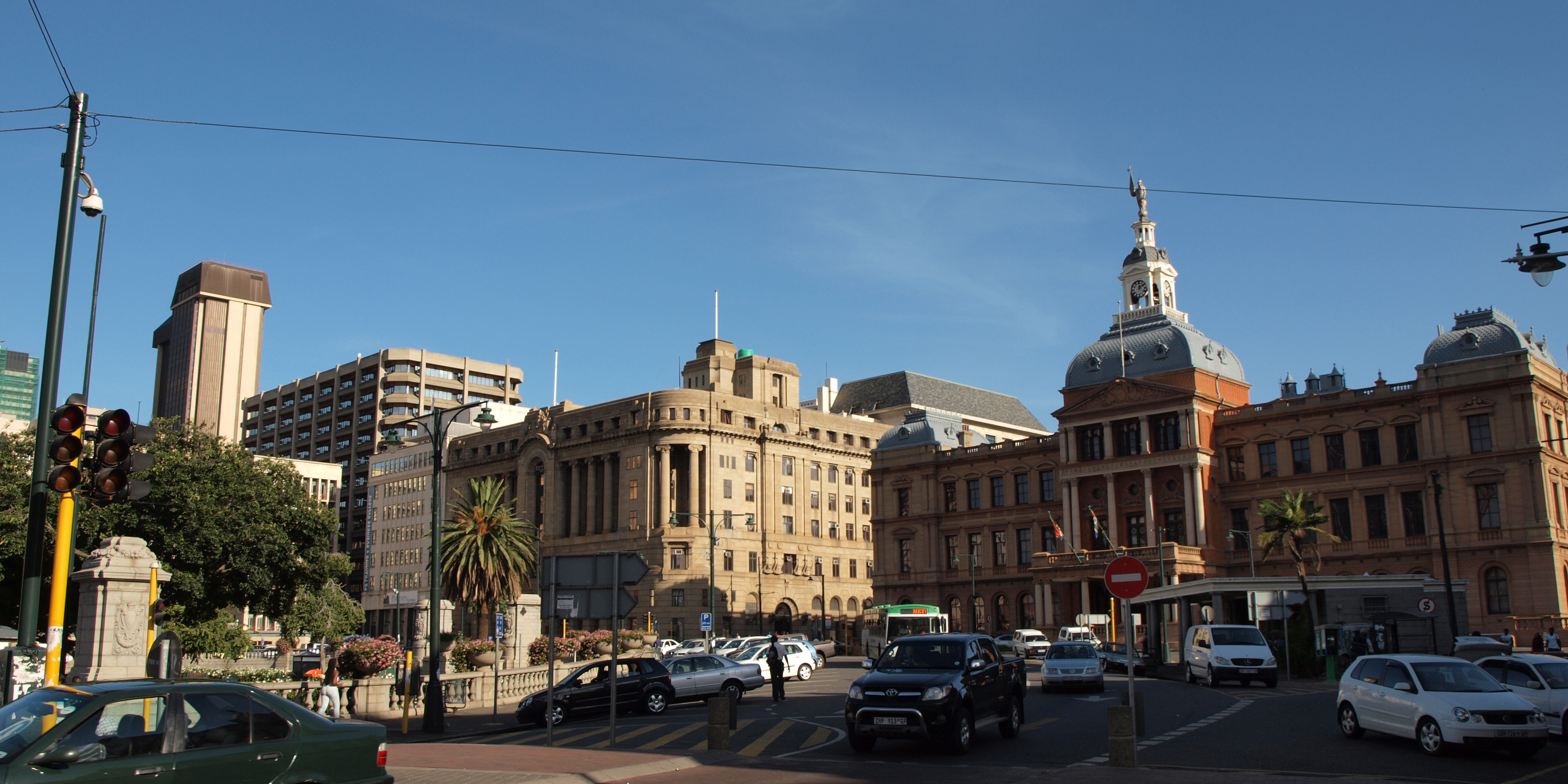
Church Square

=== Central business district ===
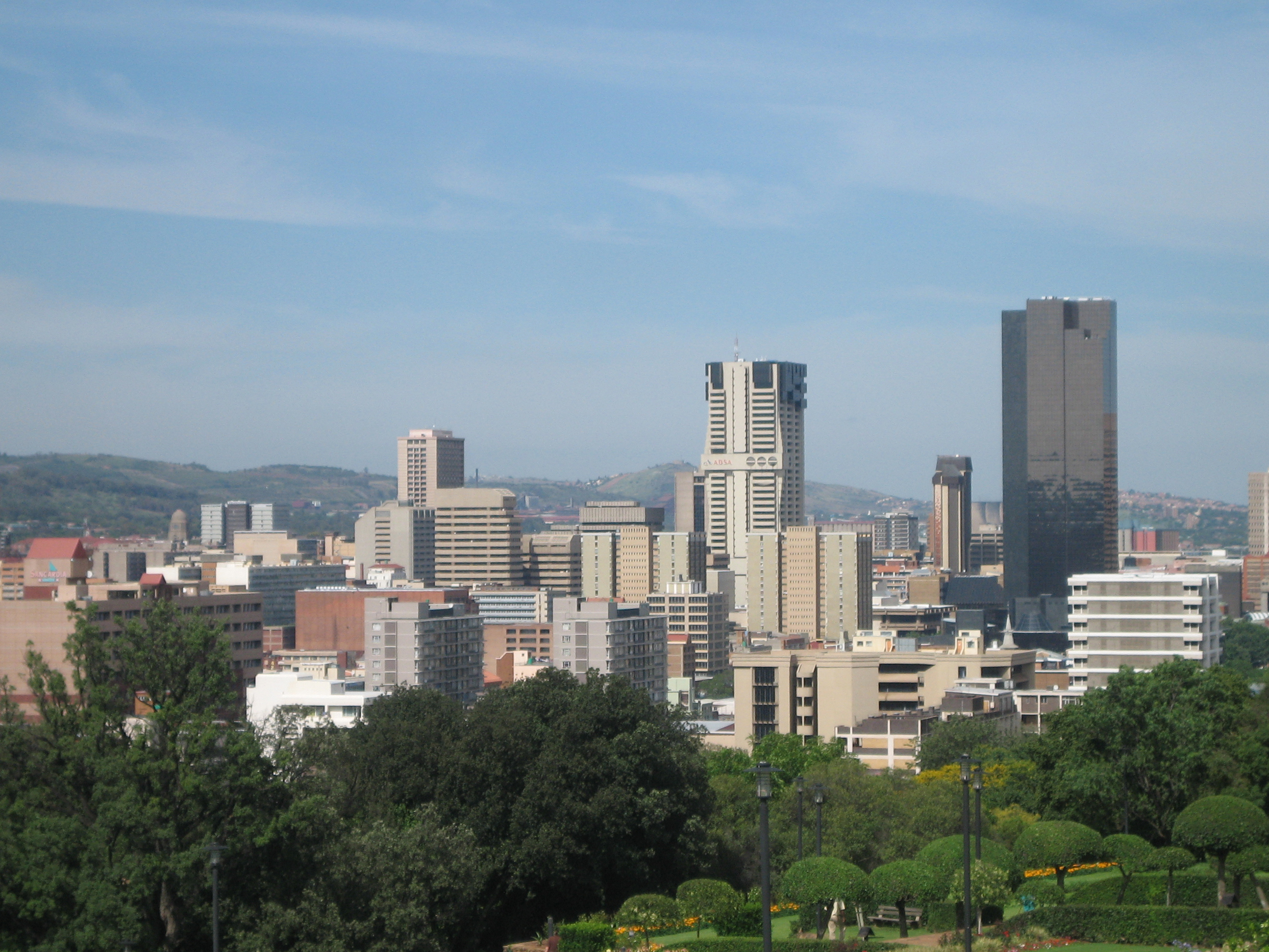
The central business district

Despite the many corporate offices, small businesses, shops, and government departments that are situated in Pretoria's sprawling suburbs, its central business district still retains its status as the traditional centre of government and commerce. Many banks, businesses, large corporations, shops, shopping centres, and other businesses are situated in the city centre which is towered by several large skyscrapers, the tallest of which is the Poyntons Building (110 m or 360 ft tall), the ABSA Building (132 m or 433 ft tall) and the Reserve Bank of South Africa building (150 m or 490 ft tall).

The area contains a large number of historical buildings, monuments, and museums that include the Pretoria City Hall, National Library of South Africa, Pretorius Square, Church Square (along with its many historical buildings and statues), and the Ou Raadsaal. There is also the Transvaal Museum (the country's leading natural history museum, which although it has changed venues a number of times, has been around since 1892), the National Zoological Gardens of South Africa (or more colloquially known as the Pretoria Zoo), Melrose House Museum in Jacob Maré Street, the Pretoria Art Museum and the African Window Cultural History Museum.

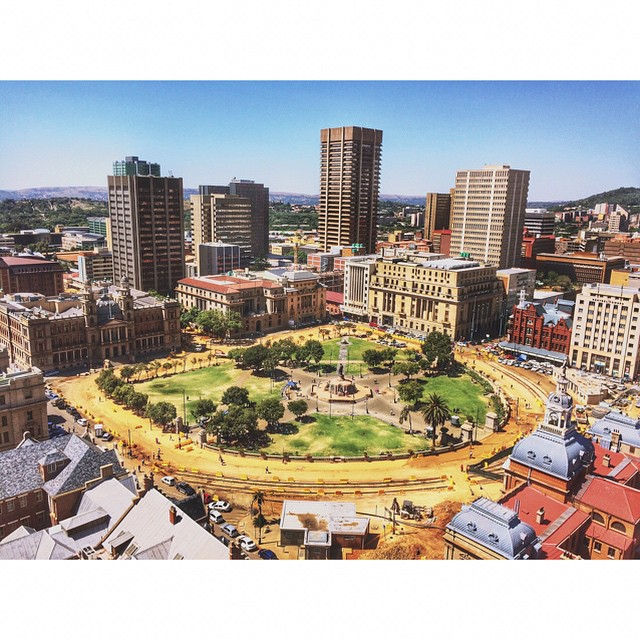
Church Square, Pretoria

Several national government departments also have their head offices in the central business district, including the Department of Health, Basic Education, Transport, Higher Education and Training, Sport and Recreation, Justice and Constitutional Development, Public Service and Administration, Water and Environmental Affairs and the National Treasury. The district also has a high number of residential buildings which house people who primarily work in the district.

=== Parks and gardens ===
Pretoria is home to the National Zoological Gardens of South Africa, as well as the Pretoria National Botanical Garden. There are also a number of smaller parks and gardens located throughout the city, including the Austin Roberts Bird Sanctuary, Pretorius Square gardens, the Pretoria Rosarium, Church Square, Pretoria Showgrounds, Springbok Park, Freedom Park, Jan Cilliers Park and Burgers Park, the oldest park in the city and now a national monument. In the suburbs there are also several parks that are notable: Rietondale Park, "Die Proefplaas" in the Queenswood suburb, Magnolia Dell Park, Nelson Mandela Park and Mandela Park Peace Garden and Belgrave Square Park.

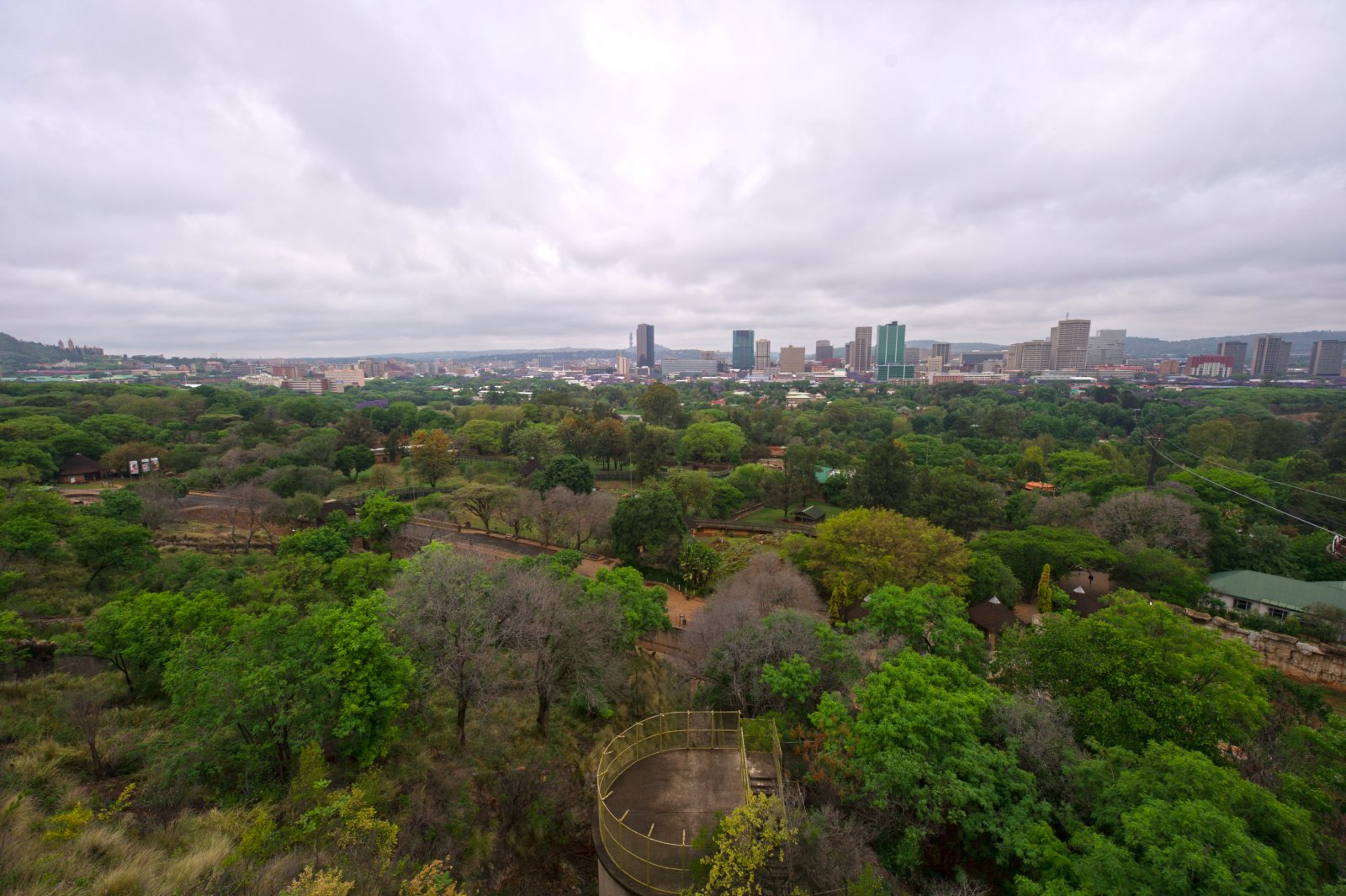
View of Pretoria from the Pretoria Zoo

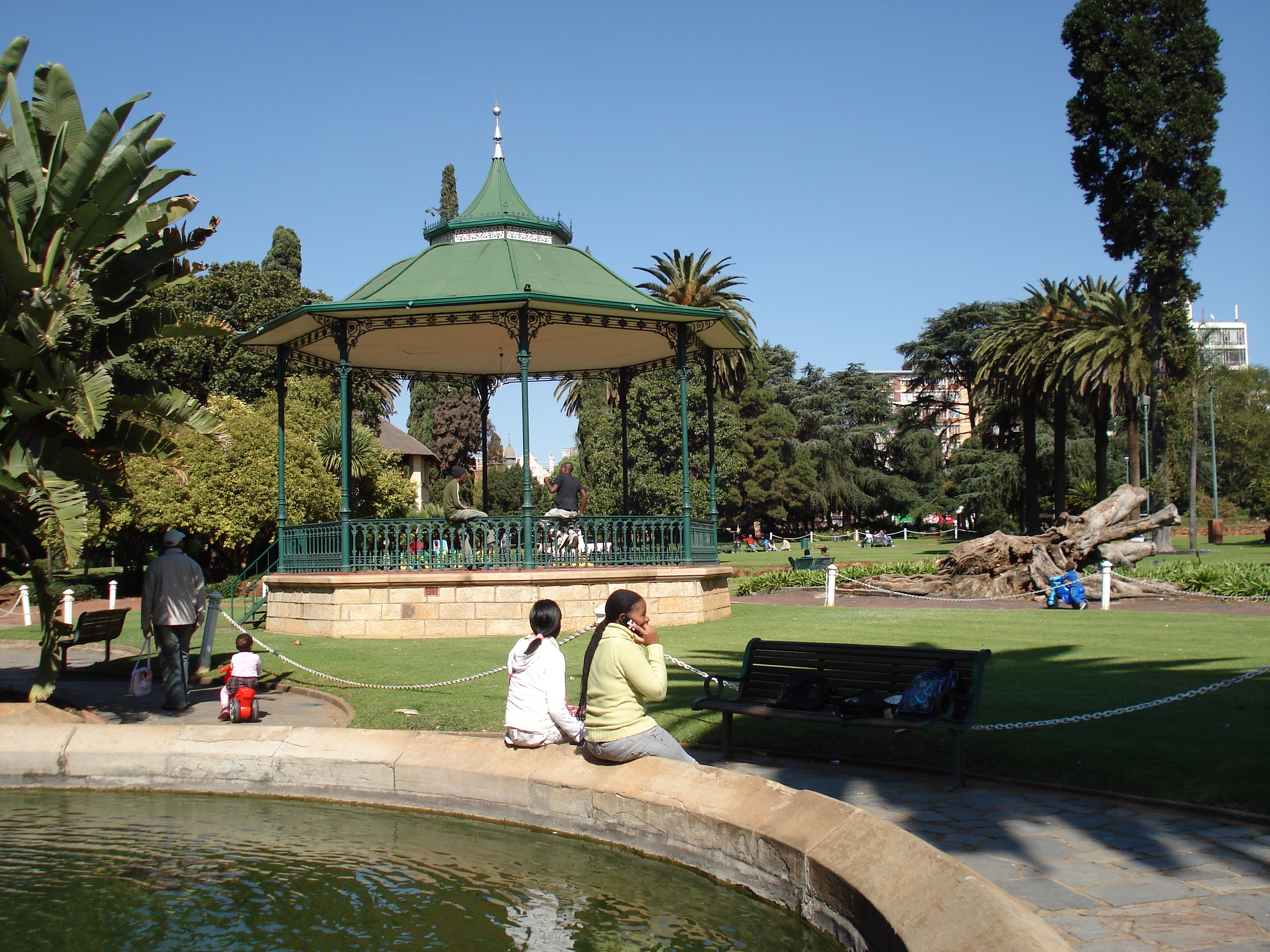
Burgers Park

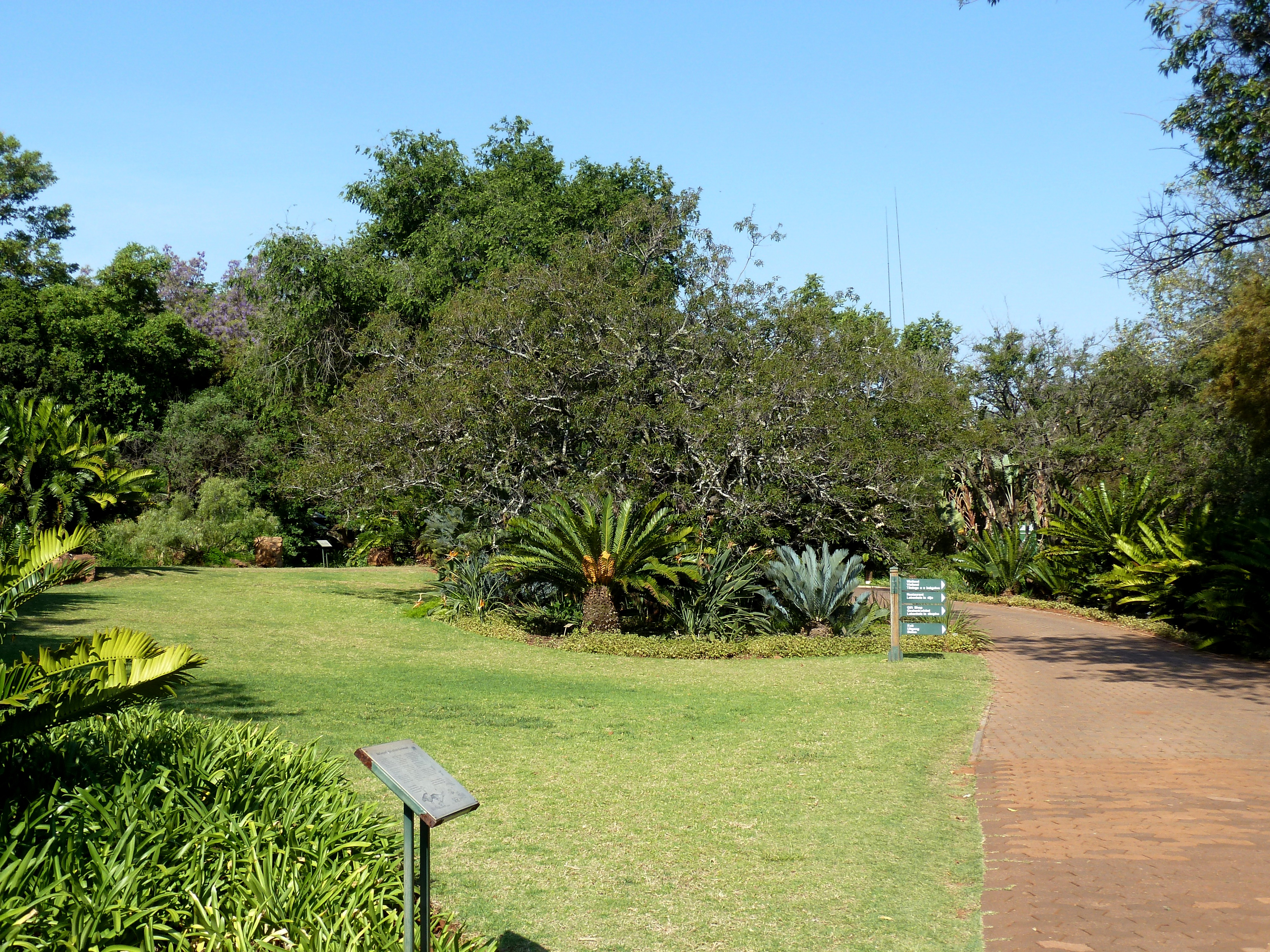
Pretoria National Botanical Gardens

==== Jacaranda city ====
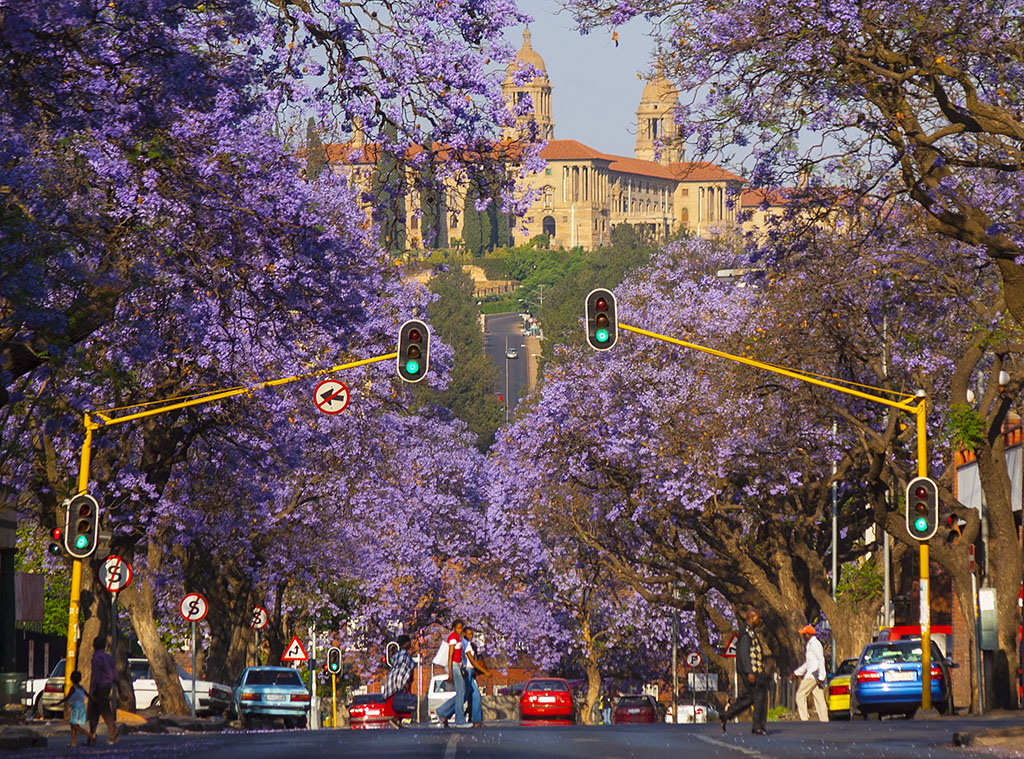
A street lined with jacarandas in Pretoria, with the Union Buildings atop Meintjieskop in the background

Pretoria's nickname "the Jacaranda City" comes from the around 70,000 jacaranda trees that grow in Pretoria and decorate the city each October with their purple blossoms. The first two trees were planted in 1888 in the garden of local gardener, J.D. Cilliers, at Myrtle Lodge on Celliers Street in Sunnyside. He obtained the seedlings from a Cape Town nurseryman who had harvested them in Rio de Janeiro, Brazil. The two trees still stand on the grounds of the Sunnyside Primary School.

The jacaranda comes from tropical South America and belongs to the family Bignoniaceae. There are around fifty species of jacaranda, but the one found most often in the warmer areas of Southern Africa is Jacaranda mimosifolia.

At the end of the 19th century, the flower and tree grower James Clark imported jacaranda seedlings from Australia and began growing them on a large scale. In November 1906, he donated two hundred small saplings to the Pretoria City Council, which planted them on Koch Street (today Bosman Street). The city engineer Walton Jameson, soon known as "Jacaranda Jim", launched a programme to plant jacaranda trees throughout Pretoria, and by 1971 there would already be 55,000 of them in the city.

Most jacarandas in Pretoria are lilac in colour, but there are also white ones planted on Herbert Baker Street in Groenkloof.

The Jacaranda Carnival is an old tradition that was held from 1939 to 1964. After a hiatus of over twenty years, it resumed in 1985. Festivities include a colourful march and the crowning of the Jacaranda Queen.

== Transportation ==
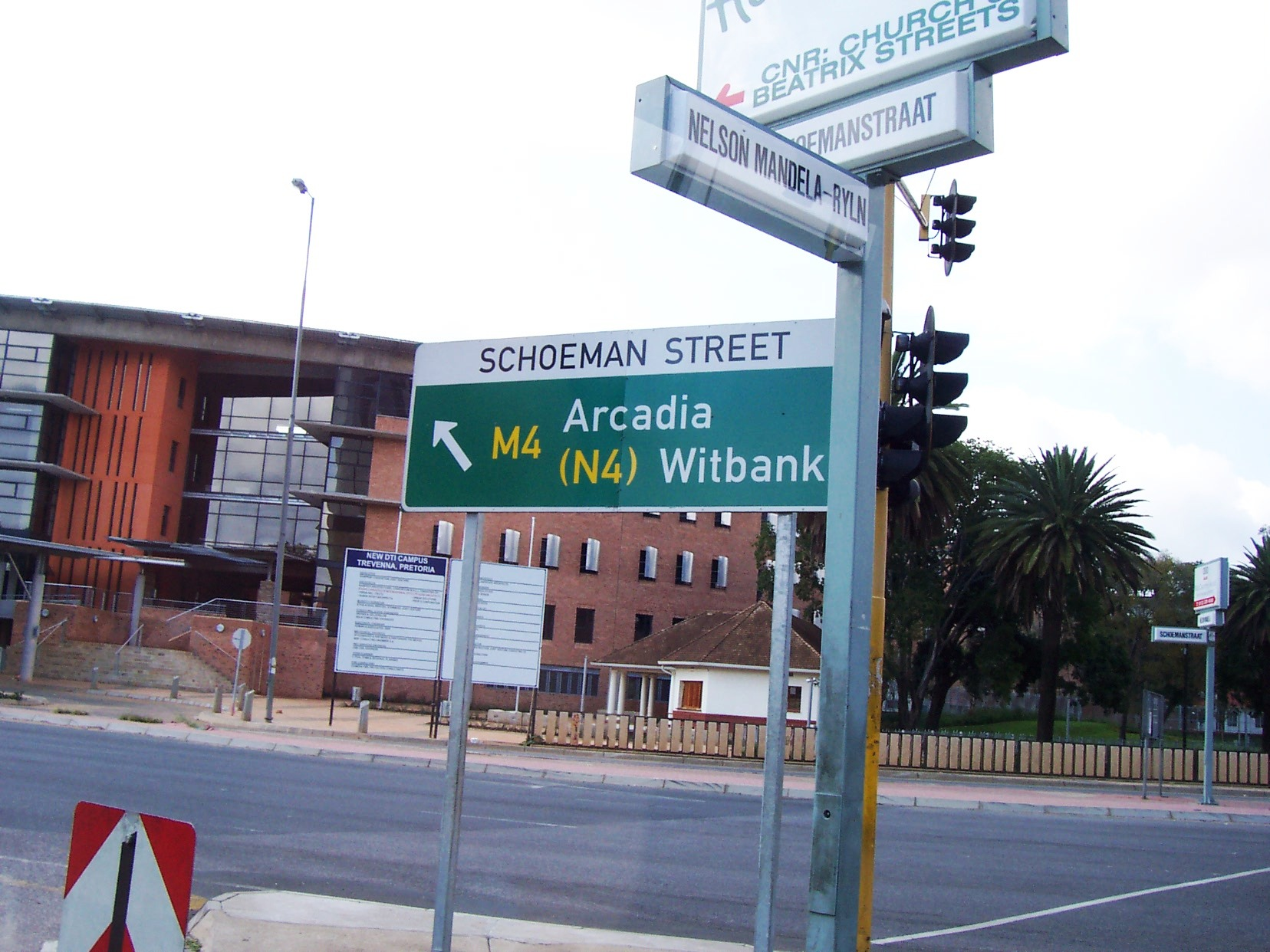
Street signs in Pretoria

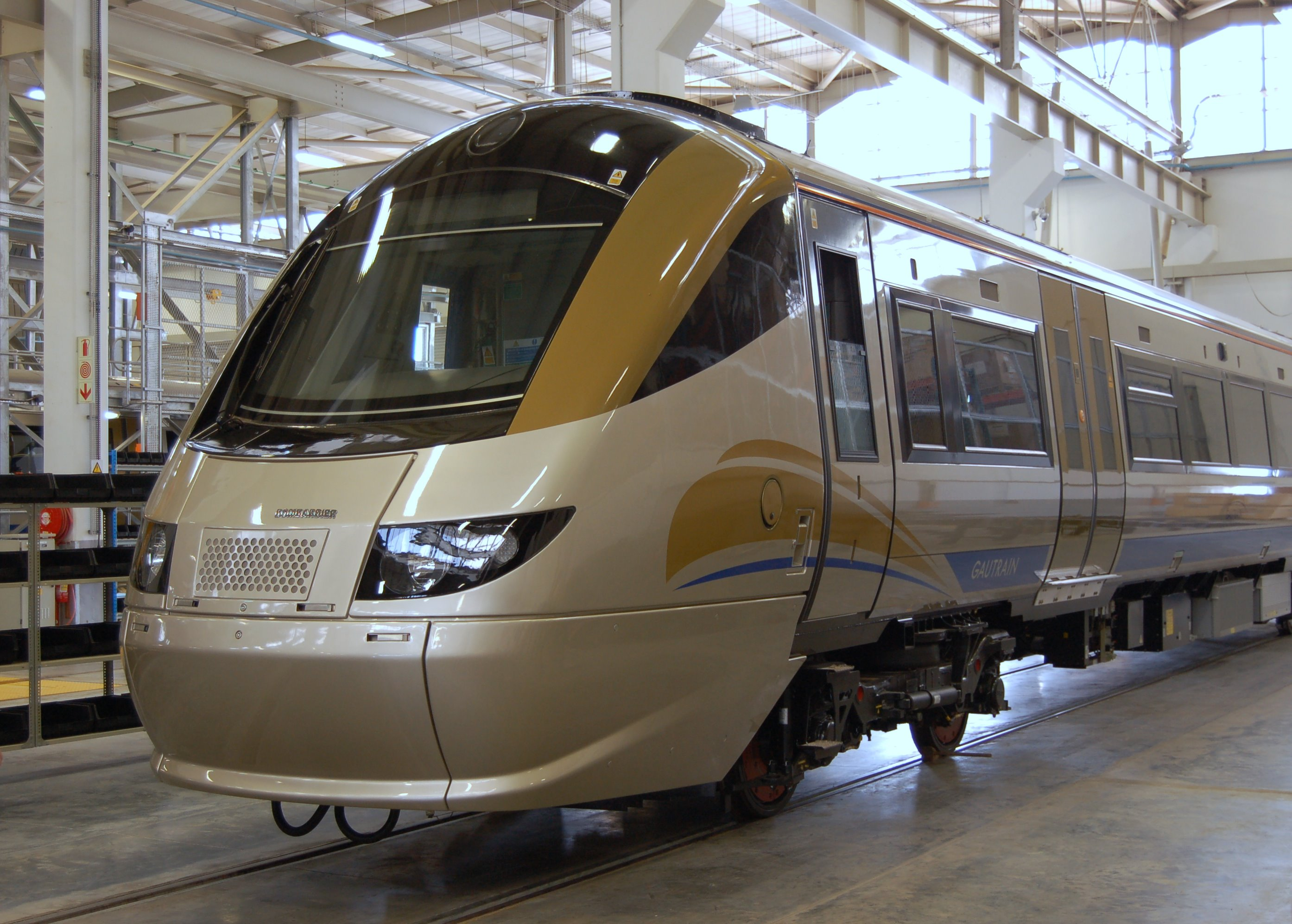
Gautrain

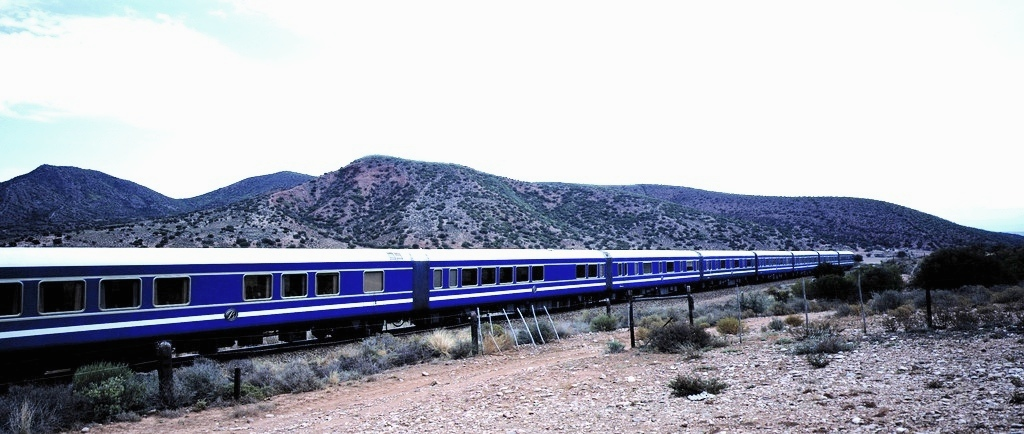
The Blue Train

=== Railway ===
Commuter rail services around Pretoria are operated by Metrorail. The routes, originating from the city centre, extend south to Germiston and Johannesburg, west to Atteridgeville, northwest to Ga-Rankuwa, north to Soshanguve and east to Mamelodi. Via the Pretoria–Maputo railway it is possible to access the port of Maputo, in the east.

The Gautrain high-speed railway line runs from the eastern suburb of Hatfield to Pretoria Station and then southwards to Centurion, Midrand, Marlboro, Sandton, Rhodesfield, OR Tambo International Airport, Rosebank and Johannesburg.

Pretoria Station is a departure point for the Blue Train luxury train. Rovos Rail, a luxury mainline train safari service operates from the colonial-style railway station at Capital Park. The South African Friends of the Rail have recently moved their vintage train trip operations from the Capital Park station to the Hercules station.

=== Buses ===
Various bus companies exist in Pretoria, of which PUTCO is one of the oldest and most recognised. Tshwane municipality provides the remainder of the bus services.

=== Road ===
The N1 is one of the freeways that runs through Pretoria. It enters from the south as the Ben Schoeman Freeway and at the Brakfontein Interchange in Centurion, the Ben Schoeman Freeway becomes the N14 and N1 continues as the intersecting north-easterly freeway (the Pretoria Eastern Bypass), bisecting the large expanse of the eastern suburbs, routing traffic from Johannesburg in the south to Polokwane and the north of the country. The N1 is a toll road north of Pretoria. The R101 is the original N1, and served the same function of connecting Pretoria with Johannesburg and Polokwane before the construction of the highway. It runs through the centre of the city on regular streets rather than the eastern suburbs.

The N4 is also a freeway that runs through Pretoria. It enters the city as a highway from eMalahleni in the east, merging with the N1 at the Proefplaas Interchange just east of the city centre. It begins again north of the city, branching west from the N1 as the Platinum Highway, forming the Pretoria Northern Bypass, and heading to Rustenburg. The N4 runs east–west through this northern part of South Africa, connecting Maputo to Gaborone. The N4 is a toll road. Before the Platinum Highway was built, the N4 continued passed the Proefplaas Interchange to the city centre, where it became a regular road, before again becoming a partially-tolled highway west of the city towards Hartbeespoort. These roads through the city centre are now designated as the M2 (from the Proefplaas Interchange to Arcadia) and the M4 (from Arcadia to Hartbeespoort).

There is a third, original east–west road: the R104, previously named Church Street, also from eMalahleni in the east through Pretoria to Hartbeespoort and Rustenburg in the west. Church Street has been renamed as Stanza Bopape Street from the M16 to Nelson Mandela Drive (M3), Helen Joseph Street from the M3 to Church Square, WF Nkomo Street from Church Square to the R511 (south-east of Hartbeespoort) and Elias Motswaledi Street from the R511 to Pelindaba.

The N14 starts from the R101 just south of the Pretoria CBD, heading south as the Ben Schoeman Freeway. At the Brakfontein interchange in Centurion, the Ben Schoeman Freeway becomes the N1 to Johannesburg, and the N14 continues as the intersecting west-south-westerly highway towards Krugersdorp. The R114 parallels the N14 from Centurion to Muldersdrift.

The R21 provides a second north–south highway, further east. It starts from the Fountains Circle south of the city centre, heading south-east to Monument Park, where it becomes a highway. It crosses the N1 at the Flying Saucer Interchange and runs north–south towards Ekurhuleni (specifically Kempton Park and Boksburg). Importantly, it links Pretoria with the OR Tambo International Airport in Kempton Park.

The R80 highway (Mabopane Highway) is a highway in the north-west of the city. The highway begins in Soshanguve and it terminates just north of the city centre (in Roseville) at an intersection with the M1.

Pretoria is also served by many regional roads. The R55 starts at an interchange with the R80, and runs north–south from Pretoria West to Sandton. The R50 starts from the N1 in the south-east of the city, and heads south-east towards Bapsfontein and Delmas. The R511 runs north–south from Sandton towards Brits and barely by-passes Pretoria to the west. The R514 starts from the M1, north of the city centre, and terminates at the R511 in Hartbeespoort. The R513 crosses Pretoria's northern suburbs from east to west. It links Pretoria to Cullinan and Bronkhorstspruit in the east and Hartbeespoort in the west. The R566 takes origin in Pretoria's northern suburbs, connecting Pretoria to Brits. The R573 (also called Moloto Road) starts from the R513 just east of the town near Kameeldrift and heads north-east to KwaMhlanga and Siyabuswa.

Pretoria is also served internally by metropolitan routes.

=== Airports ===
For scheduled air services, Pretoria is served by Johannesburg's airports: OR Tambo International, 45 km (28 mi) south of central Pretoria; and Lanseria International, 35 km (22 mi) south-west of the city. Wonderboom Airport in the suburb of Annlin in the north of Pretoria primarily services light commercial and private aircraft. However, as from August 2015, scheduled flights from Wonderboom Airport to Cape Town International Airport were made available by SA Airlink. There are two military air bases to the south of the city, Swartkop and Waterkloof.

== Culture ==
=== Media ===
Since Pretoria forms part the Tshwane Metropolitan Municipality, most radio, television and paper media is the same as the rest of the metro area.

==== Radio ====
There are many radio stations in the greater Pretoria region, some of note are:

Jacaranda FM, previously known as Jacaranda 94.2, is a commercial South African radio station, broadcasting in English and Afrikaans, with a footprint that covers Gauteng, Limpopo, Mpumalanga and the North West Province and boasts a listening audience of 3 million people a week, and a digital community of more than 1,6 million people a month. The station's format is mainstream adult contemporary with programming constructed around a playlist of hit music from the 1980s, 1990s and now.

Tuks FM is the radio station of the University of Pretoria and one of South Africa's community broadcasters. It was one of the first community broadcasters in South Africa to be given an FM licence. It is known for contemporary music and is operated by UP's student base.

Radio Pretoria is a community-based radio station in Pretoria, South Africa, whose programmes are aimed at Afrikaners. It broadcasts 24 hours a day in stereo on 104.2 FM in the greater Pretoria area. Various other transmitters (with their own frequencies) in South Africa broadcast the station's content further afield, while the station is also available on Sentech's digital satellite platform.

Impact Radio, is a Christian Community Radio Station based in Pretoria, and broadcasting on 103FM in the Greater Tshwane Area.

==== Television ====
Pretoria is serviced by eTV, SABC, MNET, and SuperSport.

==== Paper ====
The city is serviced by a variety of printed publications namely;

Pretoria News is a daily newspaper established in Pretoria in 1898. It publishes a daily edition from Monday to Friday and a Weekend edition on Saturday and Sunday. It is an independent newspaper in the English language that serves the city and its direct environs. It is available online via the Independent online website.

Beeld is an Afrikaans-language daily newspaper that was launched on 16 September 1974. Beeld is distributed in four provinces of South Africa: Gauteng, Mpumalanga, Limpopo, North West. Die Beeld (English: The Image) was an Afrikaans-language Sunday newspaper in the late 1960s.

=== Pretoria Creole ===
SePitori is the urban lingua franca of Pretoria and the Tshwane metropolitan area in South Africa. It is a combination of Tswana and Northern Sotho (Pedi), with influences from Tsotsitaal and other black South African languages. It is a creole language that developed in the city during the years of Apartheid.

=== Museums ===
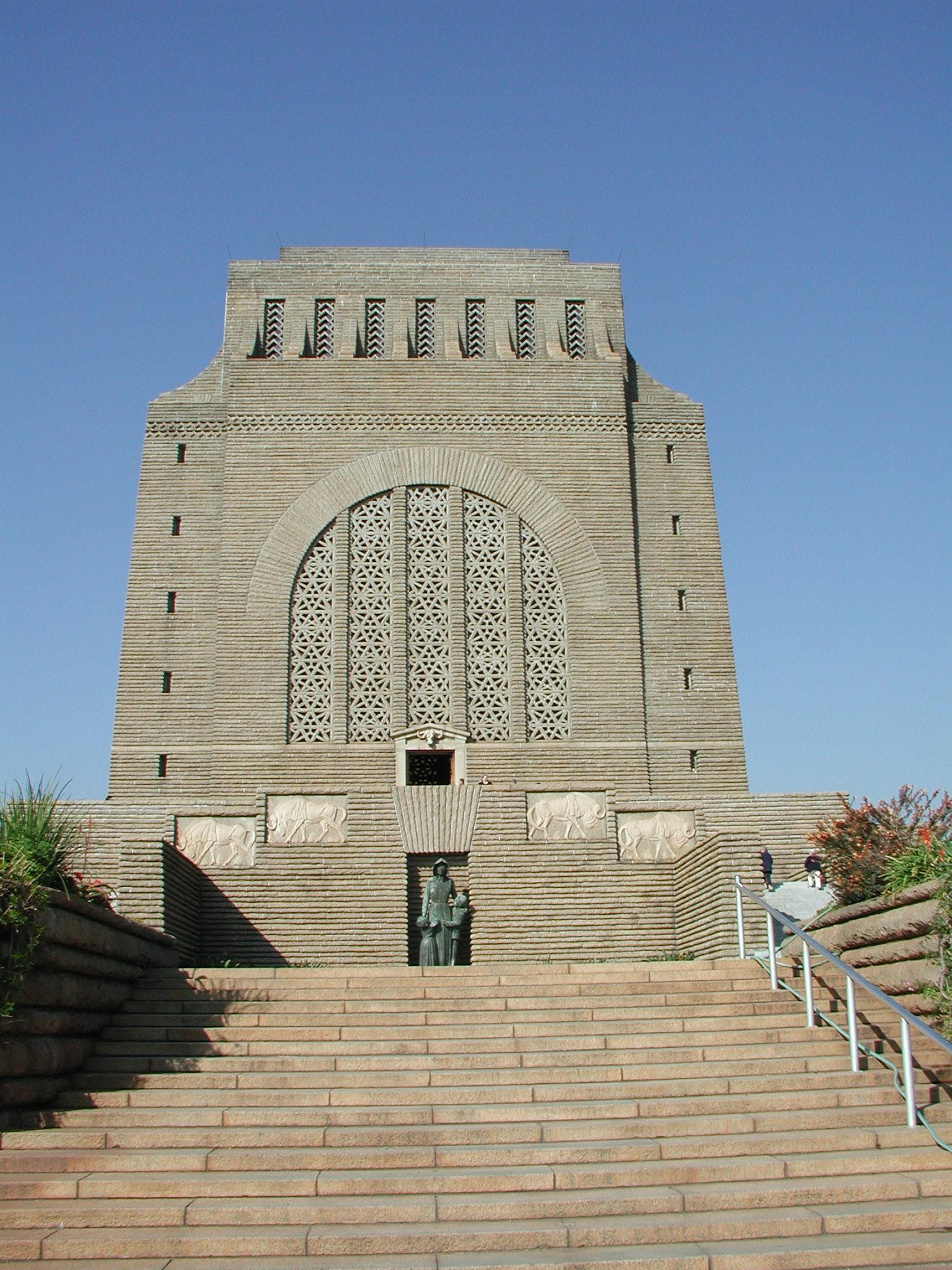
The Voortrekker Monument

- Ditsong National Museum of Cultural History, a.k.a. African Window
- Ditsong National Museum of Natural History
- Freedom Park
- Hapo Museum
- Kruger House (residence of the president of the ZAR, Paul Kruger)
- Mapungubwe Museum
- Melrose House (the Treaty of Vereeniging which ended the Anglo-Boer War was signed here in 1902)
- National Library of South Africa
- Pioneer Museum
- Pretoria Art Museum
- Pretoria Forts
- South African Air Force Museum
- Transvaal Museum
- Van Tilburg Collection
- Van Wouw Museum
- Voortrekker Monument
- Willem Prinsloo Agricultural Museum
- Sammy Marks House
- SP Engelbrecht Museum (history of the NHK church)
- Smuts House Museum
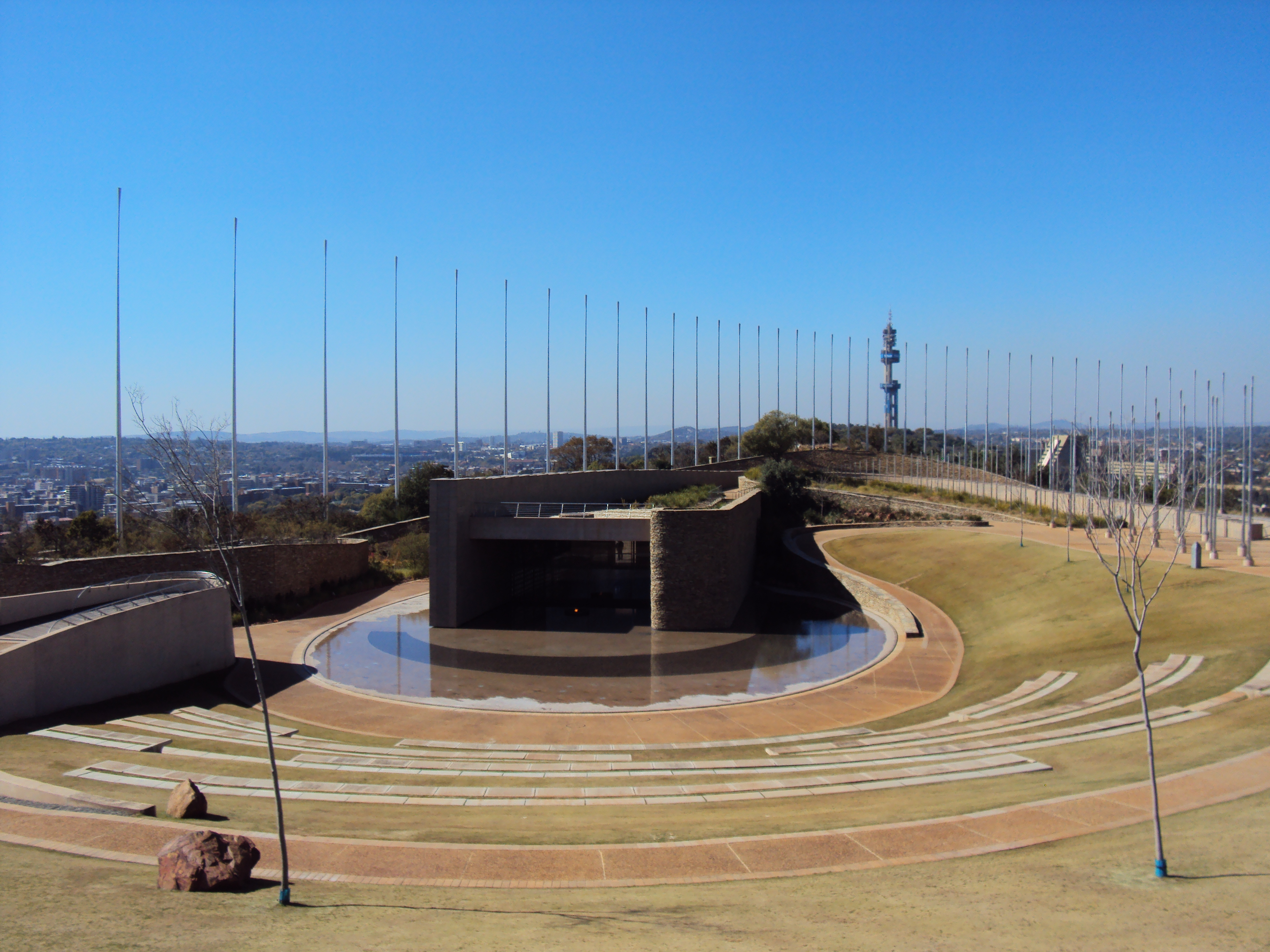
Freedom Park's amphitheatre

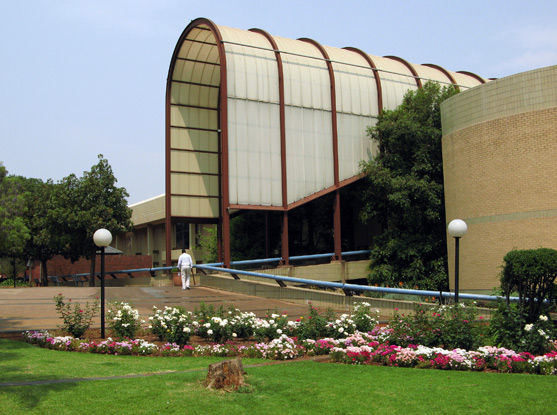
African Window

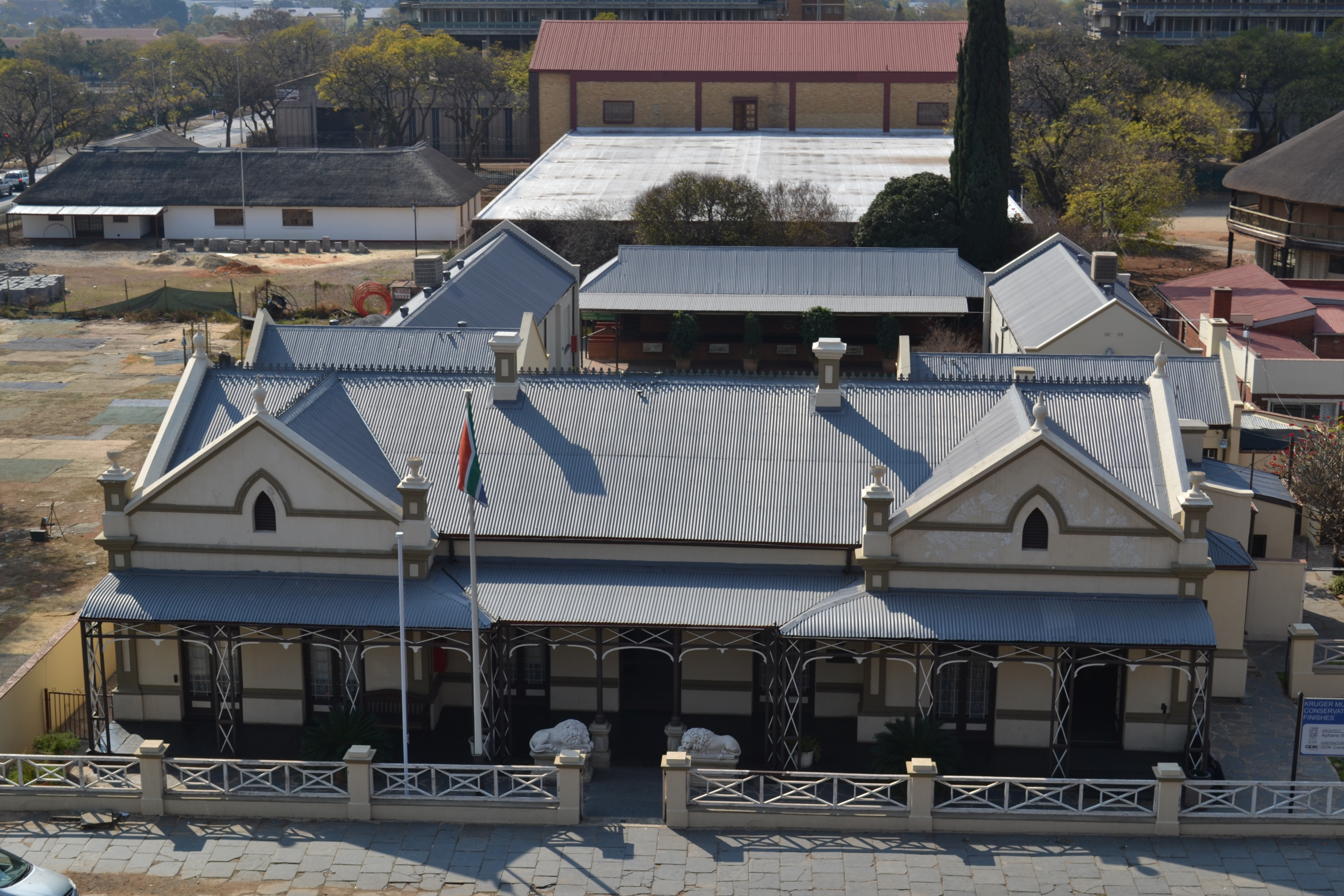
Paul Kruger's House

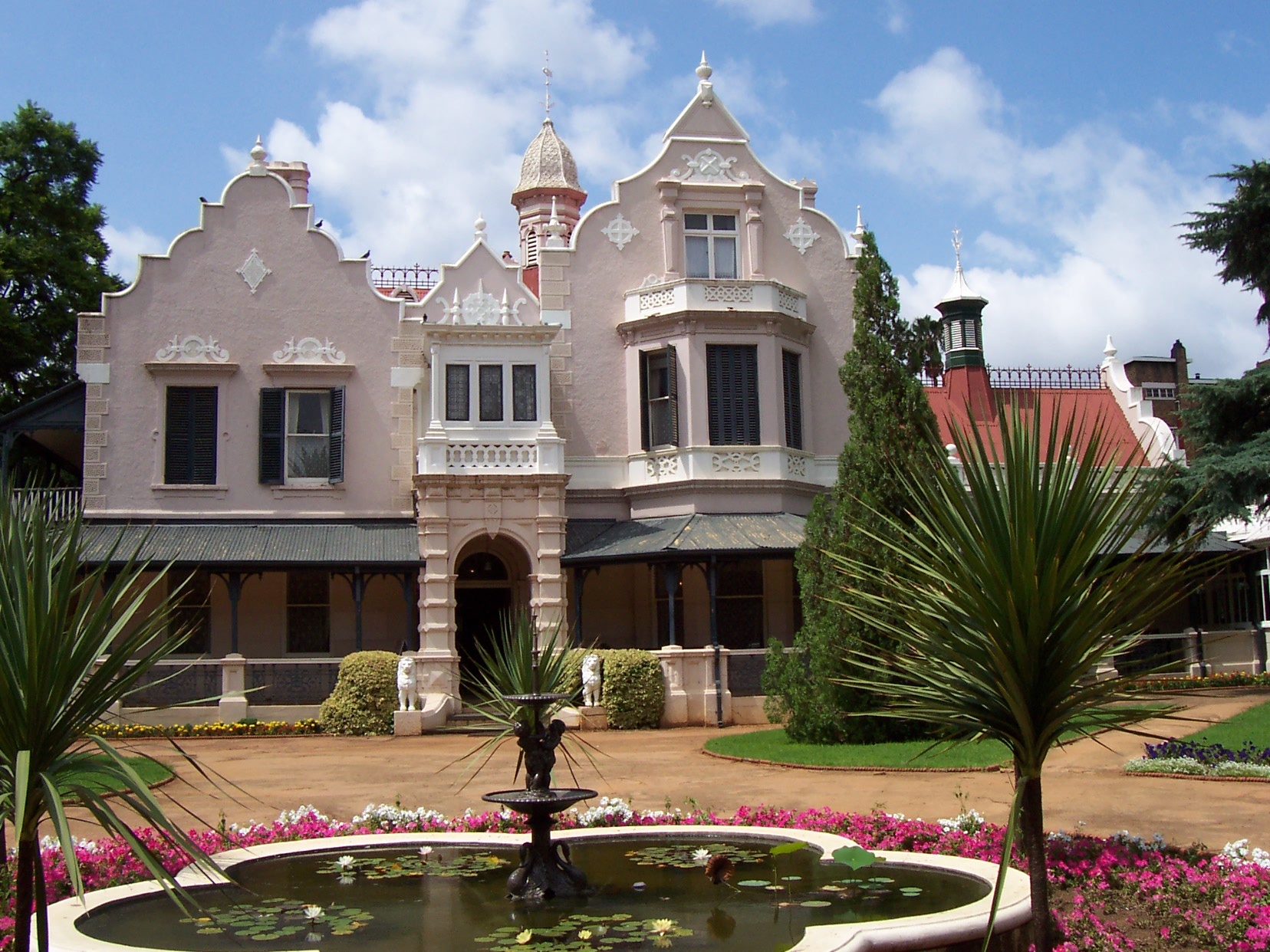
Melrose House
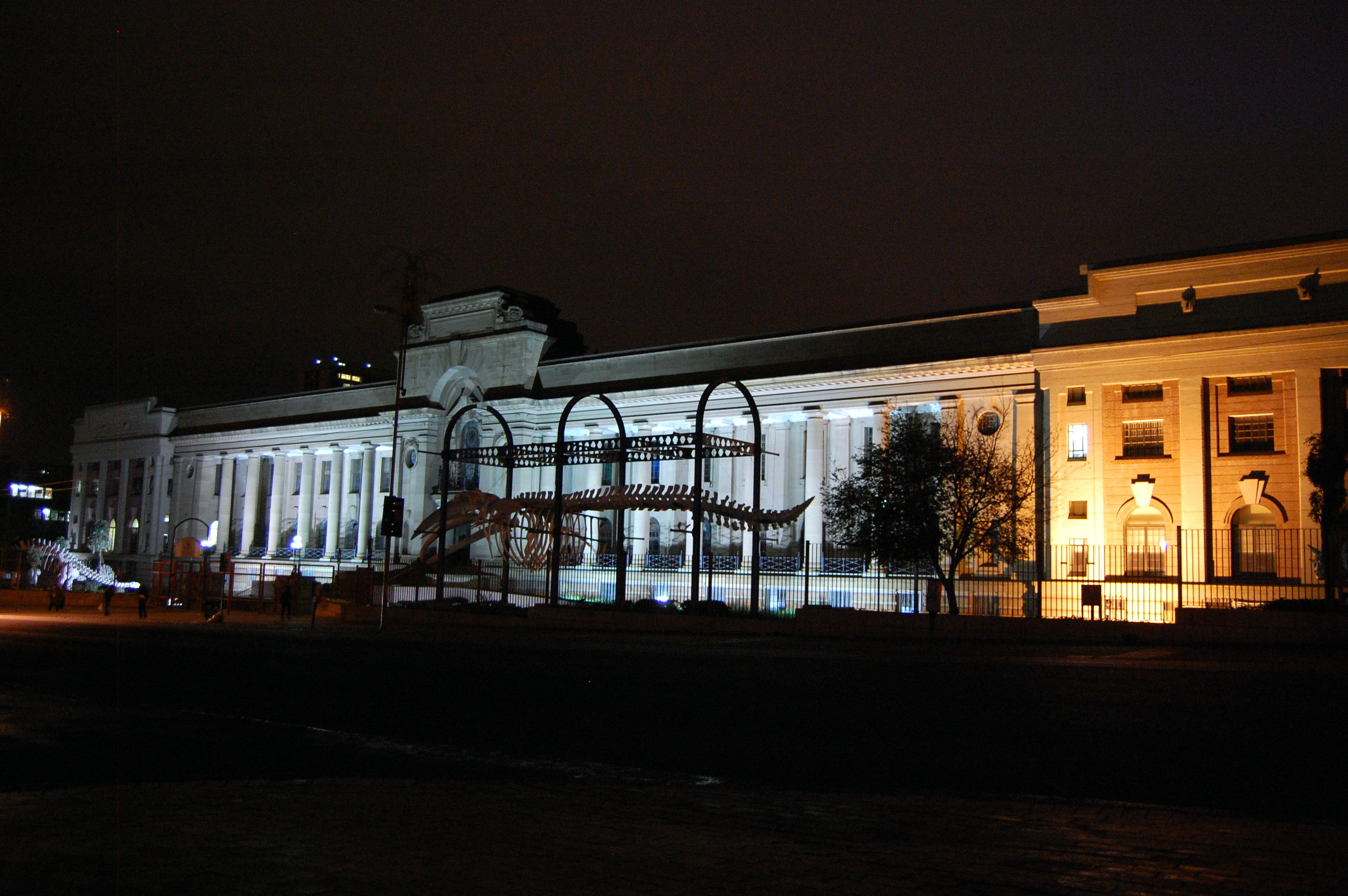
Ditsong National Museum of Natural History

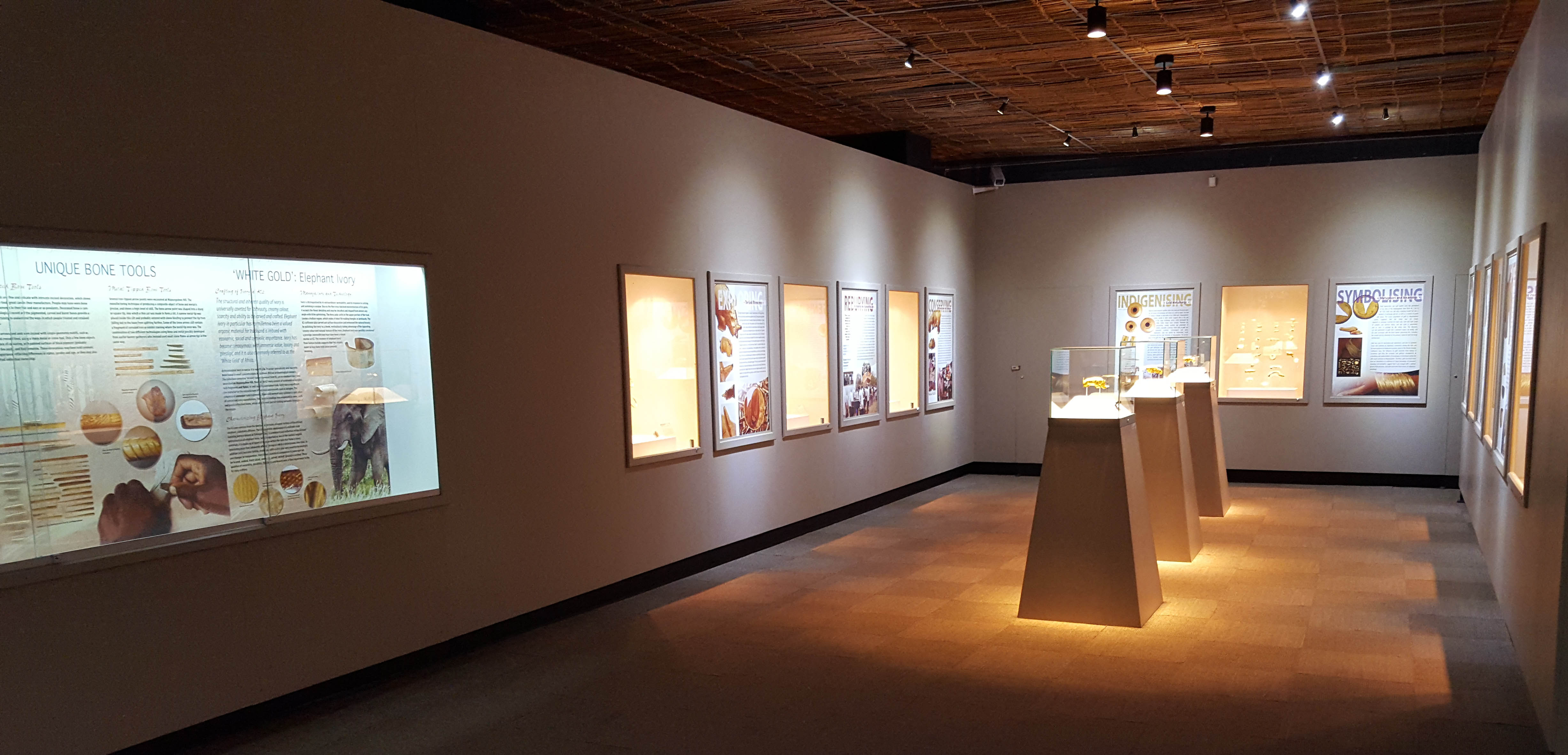
Mapungubwe Collection

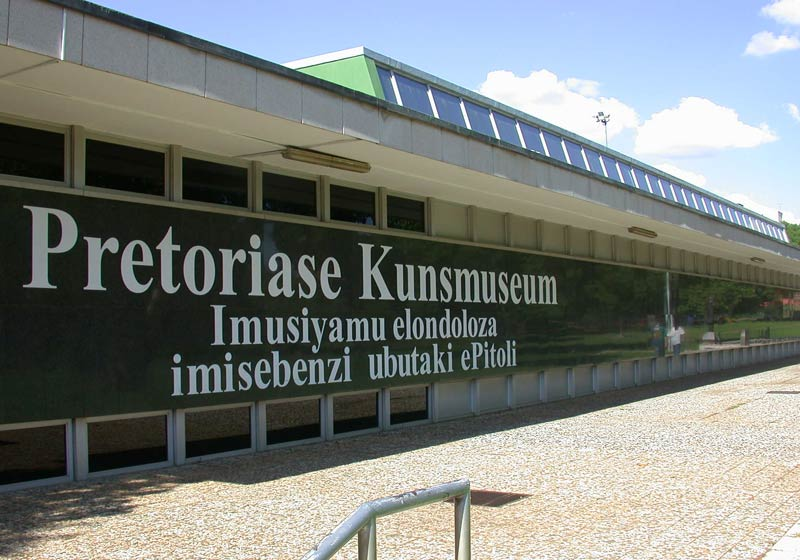
Pretoria Art Museum

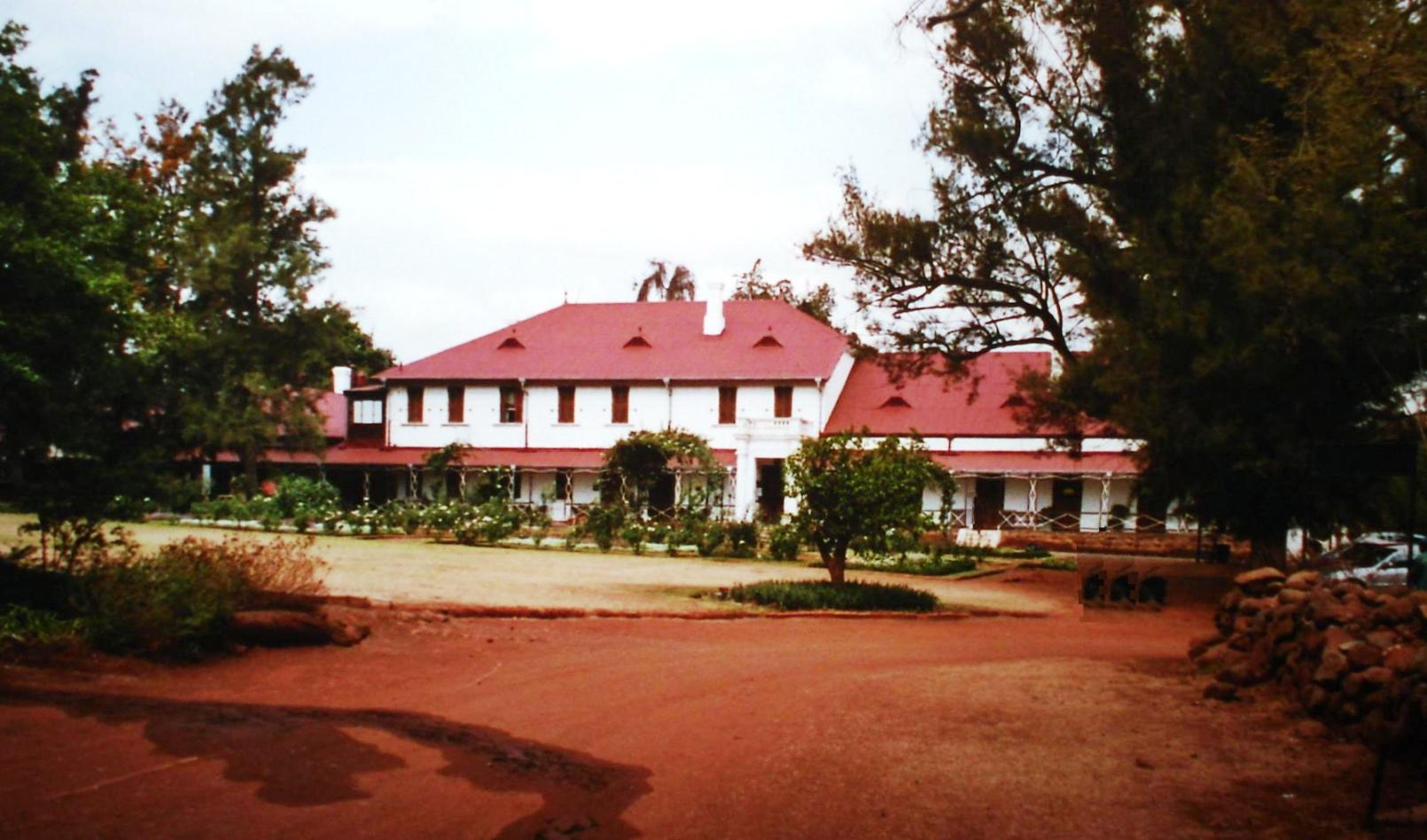
Sammy Marks museum

=== Music ===
A number of popular South African bands and musicians are originally from Pretoria. These include Desmond and the Tutus, Bittereinder, The Black Cat Bones, Seether, popular mostwako rapper JR, Joshua na die Reën and DJ Mujava who was raised in the town of Attridgeville.

The song "Marching to Pretoria" refers to this city. Pretoria was the capital of the South African Republic (a.k.a. Republic of the Transvaal; 1852–1881 and 1884–1902) the principal battleground for the First and Second Boer War, the latter which brought both the Transvaal and the Orange Free State republic under British rule. "Marching to Pretoria" was one of the songs that British soldiers sang as they marched from the Cape Colony, under British Rule since 1814, to the capital of the Southern African Republic (or in Dutch, Zuid-Afrikaansche Republiek). As the song's refrain puts it: "We are marching to Pretoria, Pretoria, Pretoria/We are marching to Pretoria, Pretoria, Hurrah."

The opening line of John Lennon's Beatles song I Am the Walrus, "I am he as you are he as you are me and we are all together", is often believed to be based on the lyric "I'm with you and you're with me and so we are all together" in "Marching to Pretoria". Lennon denied this, insisting his lyrics came from "nothing".

==== Hip-Hop ====
The Hip-hop scene in Pretoria is recognised as one of South Africa's most distinctive, marked by its distinctive use of Spitori- a Lingua franca blending SeTswana, Sepedi, Isizulu, Afrikaans and other languages. The city has produced several influential artists, including Focalistic, 25K, Thato Saul and A-Reece.

==== Bacardi ====
Bacardi is a style of music that originated in Pretoria. Early pioneers in the 2000s, including Elvis "DJ Mujava" Maswanganyi, Gift "DJ Dadaman" Mashaba, and Sammy "DJ Pencil" Moripe, helped define the sound with songs like Mugwanti, Ko Morago, and Miami. Characterised by its raw, percussive beats, repetitive rhythms, and deep basslines. Bacardi became a defining soundtrack of township parties and carwash gatherings. The genre is closely tied to the Spitori culture and Pretoria street life. Contemporary artists who make music within the genre include Focalistic, Karabo "Jelly Babie" Khakhu, Mellow & Sleazy, and DJ Maphorisa, many of whom blend Bacardi with Amapiano. Another distinctive feature of the genre are its dance moves, which are fast-paced, have intense footwork that match the beat. These have gained international exposure through artists such as Tyla who has included them in her performances

==== Amapiano ====
Amapiano has strong roots in Pretoria, where its early producers and DJs experimented with Bacardi rhythms and deep house elements. Emerging in the mid-2010s, amapiano is a hybrid of kwaito, deep house, gqom, jazz, soul, and lounge music characterized by synths and wide, percussive basslines. Amapiano is further defined by its log drum, jazzy piano chords, and smooth tempo. Many of the genre's most influential artists and producers trace their roots to Pretoria. Kabza de Small whilst born in Mpumalanga, relocated to Pretoria and is widely regarged as a pioneer and one of the kings of Amapiano. Vigro Deep, from Atteridgeville in Pretoria, is another leading producer whose early works helped shape the sounds. DJ Maphorisa, one half of the Scorpion Kings duo with Kabza, hails from Soshanguve, Pretoria. Other influential artists include Focalistic and Pabi Cooper.

=== Performing arts and galleries ===
The Pretoria Art Museum is home to a collection of local artworks. After a bequest of 17th century Dutch artworks by Lady Michaelis in 1932 the art collection of Pretoria City Council expanded quickly to include South African works by Henk Pierneef, Pieter Wenning, Frans Oerder, Anton van Wouw and Irma Stern. And according to the museum: "As South African museums in Cape Town and Johannesburg already had good collections of 17th, 18th and 19th century European art, it was decided to focus on compiling a representative collection of South African art" making it somewhat unusual compared to its contemporaries.

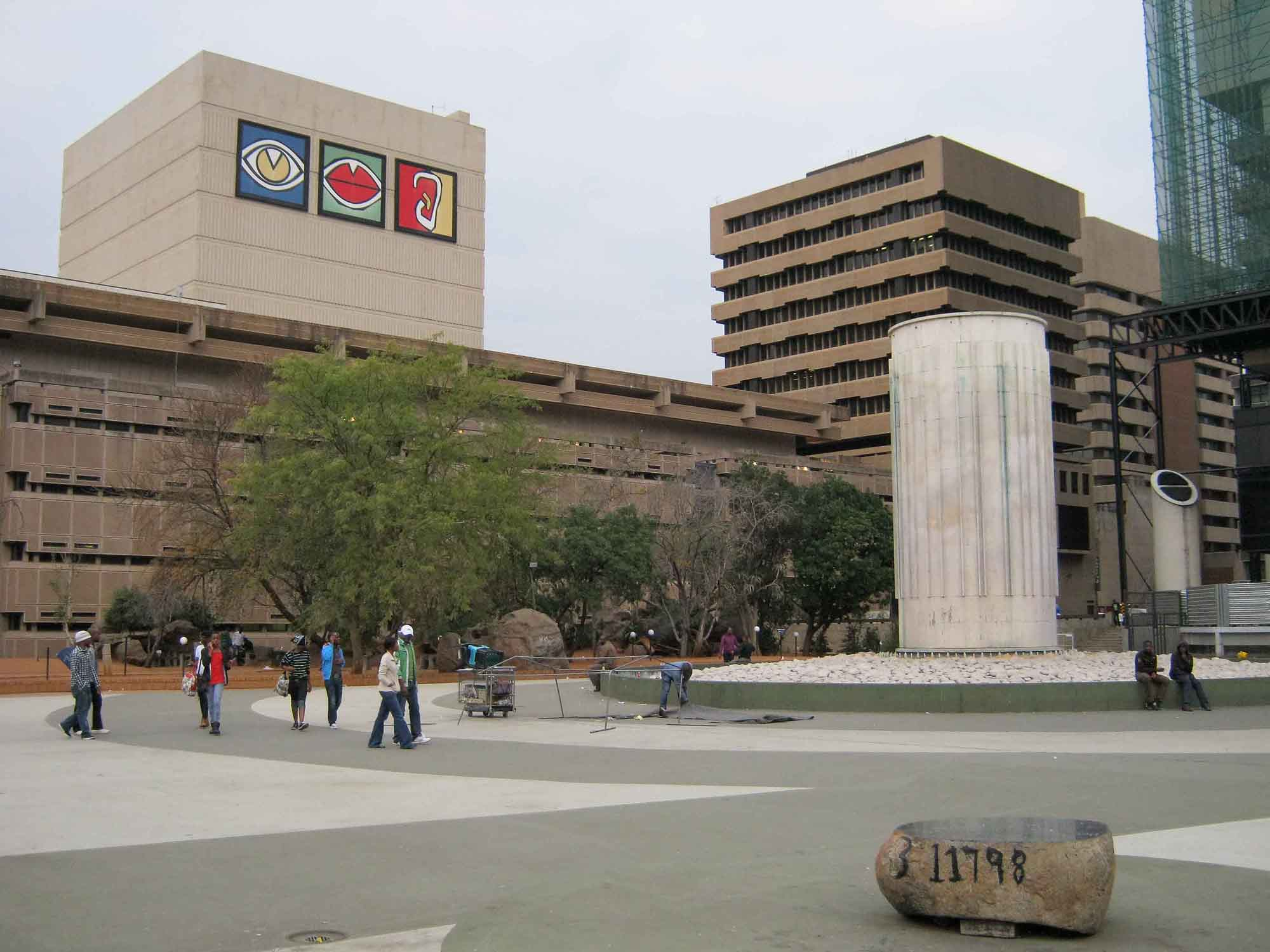
South African State Theatre

Pretoria houses several performing arts venues including: the South African State Theatre which houses the arts of Opera, musicals, plays and comedic performances.

A 9-metre-tall (30 ft) statue of former president Nelson Mandela was unveiled in front of the Union Buildings on 16 December 2013. Since Nelson Mandela's inauguration as South Africa's first majority elected president the Union Buildings have come to represent the new 'Rainbow Nation'. Public art in Pretoria has flourished since the 2010 FIFA World Cup with many areas receiving new public artworks.

=== Sport ===
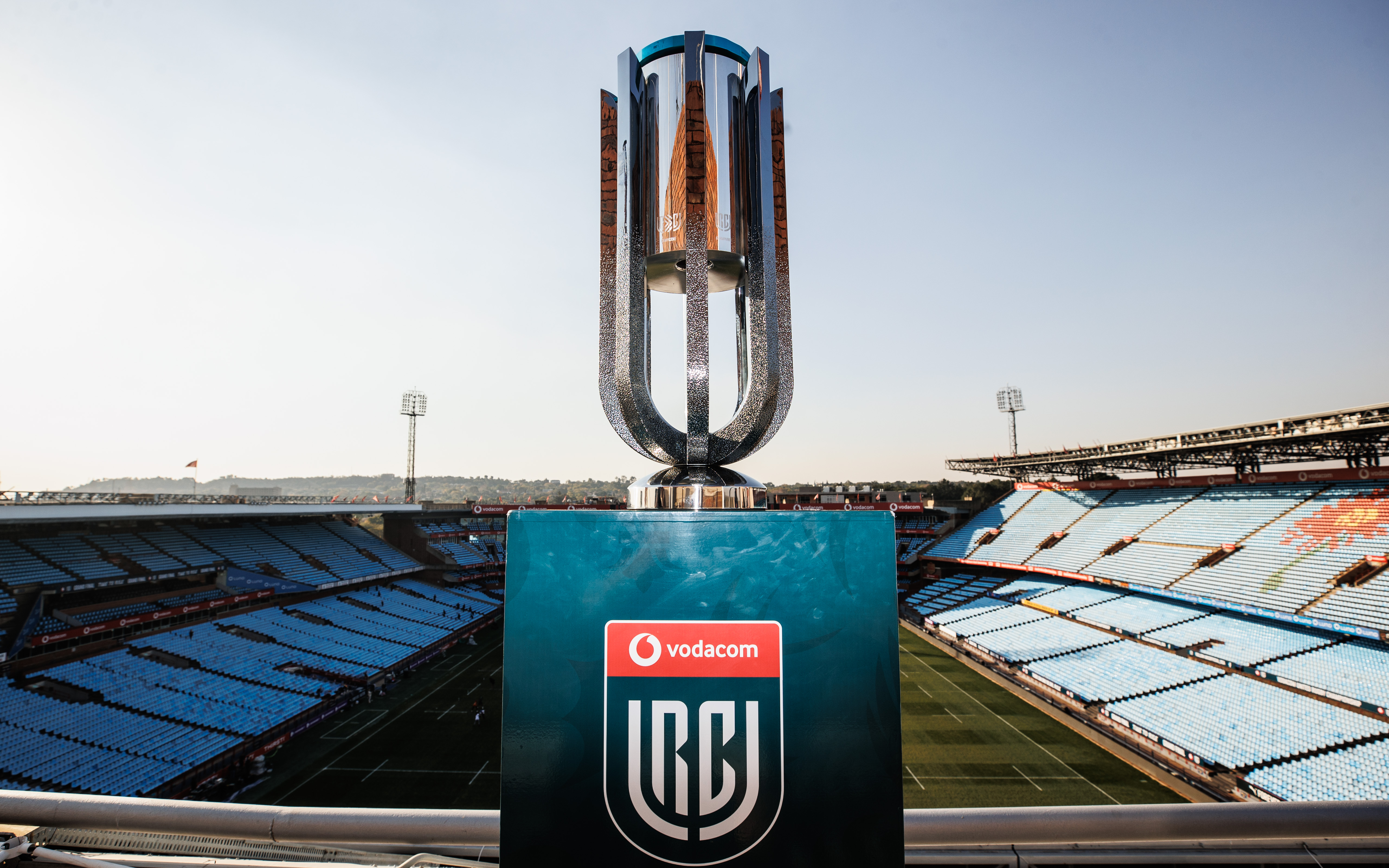
Loftus Versfeld Stadium

One of the most popular sports in Pretoria is rugby union. Loftus Versfeld is home to the Blue Bulls, who compete in the domestic Currie Cup, and also to the Bulls in the international United Rugby Championship competition. The Bulls rugby team, which is operated by the Blue Bulls, won the Super Rugby competition in 2007, 2009 and 2010. Loftus Versfeld also hosts the football side Mamelodi Sundowns.

Pretoria also hosted matches during the 1995 Rugby World Cup. Loftus Versfeld was used for some matches in the 2010 FIFA World Cup.

Association football (soccer) is one of the most popular sports in the city. There are two soccer teams in the city playing in South Africa's top-flight league, the Premiership. They are Mamelodi Sundowns and Supersport United. Supersport United were the 2008–09 PSL Champions. Following the 2011/2012 season the University of Pretoria F.C. gained promotion to the South African Premier Division, the top domestic league, becoming the third Pretoria-based team in the league. After a poor league finish in the 2015/2016 season, University of Pretoria F.C. were relegated to the National First Division, the second-highest football league in South Africa, in the 2016 promotion/relegation play-offs.

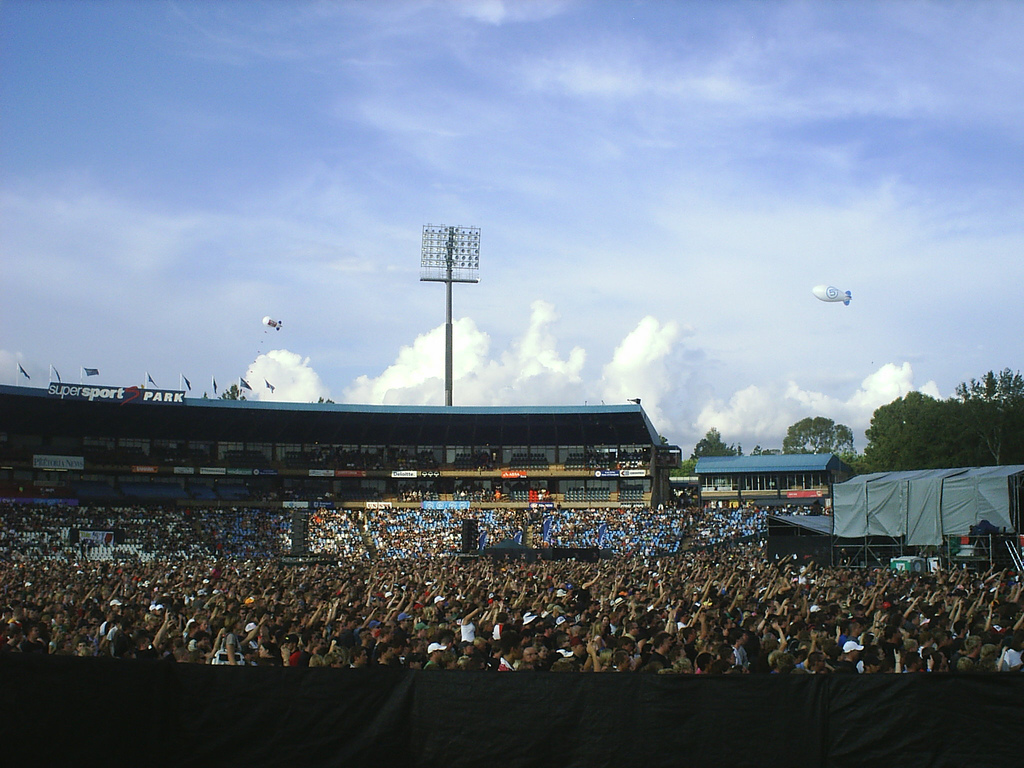
Centurion Park

Cricket is also a popular game in the city. As there is no international cricket stadium in the city, it does not host any top-class cricket tournaments, although the nearby situated Centurion has Supersport Park which is an international cricket stadium and has hosted many important tournaments such as 2003 Cricket World Cup, 2007 ICC World Twenty20, 2009 IPL and 2009 ICC Champions Trophy. The most local franchise team to Pretoria is the Titans, although Northerns occasionally play in the city in South Africa's provincial competitions. Many Pretoria born cricketers have gone on to play for South Africa, including former international captains AB de Villiers Faf du Plessis.

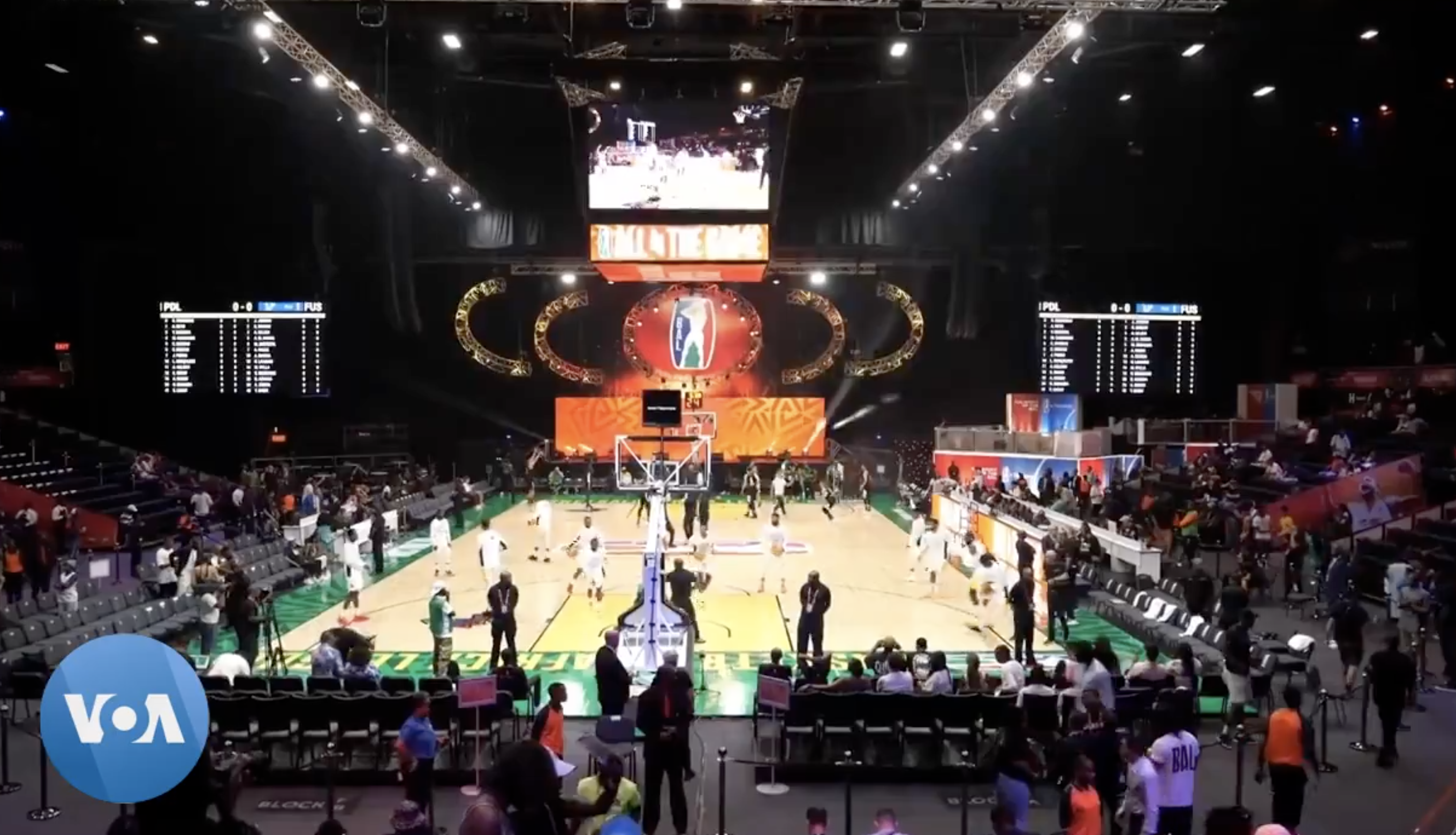
SunBet Arena, Times Square, Menlyn

The Pretoria Transnet Blind Cricket Club is situated in Pretoria and is the biggest Blind Cricket club in South Africa. Their field is at the Transnet Engineering campus on Lynette Street, home of differently disabled cricket. PTBCC has played many successful blind cricket matches with able bodied teams such as the South African Indoor Cricket Team and TuksCricket Junior Academy. Northerns Blind Cricket is the Provincial body that governs PTBCC and Filefelfia Secondary School. The Northern Blind Cricket team won the 40 over National Blind Cricket tournament that was held in Cape Town in April 2014.

The city's SunBet Arena at Time Square hosted the NBA Africa Game 2018.

Some of the oldest and most renowned golf courses in South Africa can be found in Pretoria. Founded in 1894, the Pretoria Golf Club is the oldest in the city and was among the first to admit female members. The 1910-founded Pretoria Country Club, which features a par-72 parkland layout and underwent a renovation by the Gary Player Group in the middle of the 2000s, is another iconic venue. Other noteworthy courses include Silver Lakes Golf & Wildlife Estate, which features a Peter Matkovich designed course as well as wildlife and picturesque surroundings; Wingate Park Country Club (founded in 1947)which is known for its lush surroundings. Professional and amateur competitions are frequently held in Pretoria. The Sunshine Tour and DP World Tour Championship jointly sponsored the Tshwane Open, which took place at the Pretoria Country Club. The Sunshine Ladies Tour also hosts the Ladies Tshwane Open, which is played at courses like Blair Atholl and Zwartkop in Pretoria. Up until the 1990s, Zwartkop Country Club hosted the ICL International, another historic competition. Other golf courses in Pretoria include:

- Services golf club
- Copperleaf Golf and Country Estate
- Waterkloof golf Club
- The Presidential golf course

=== Places of worship ===
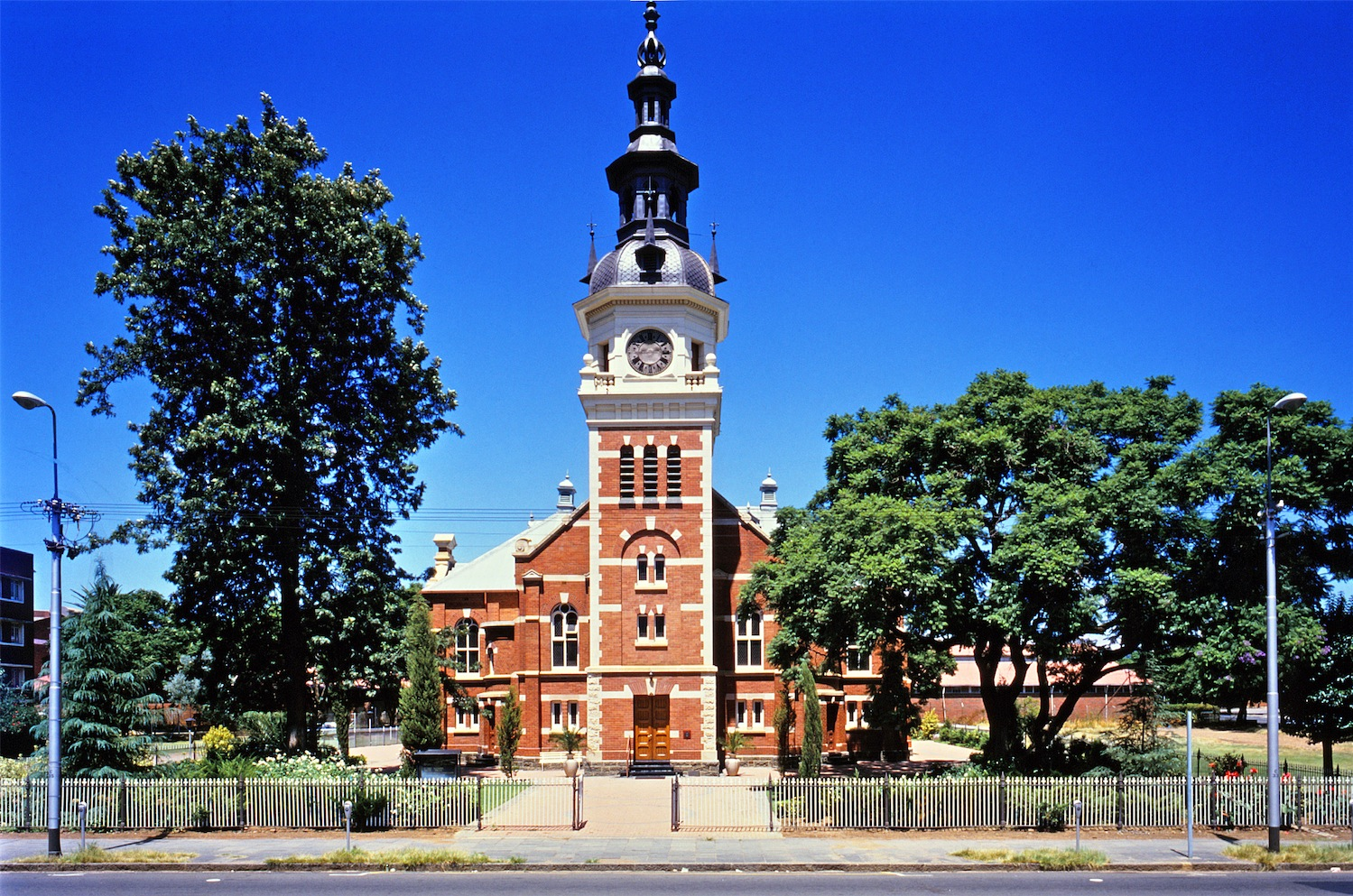
Paul Kruger's Church Building in the City

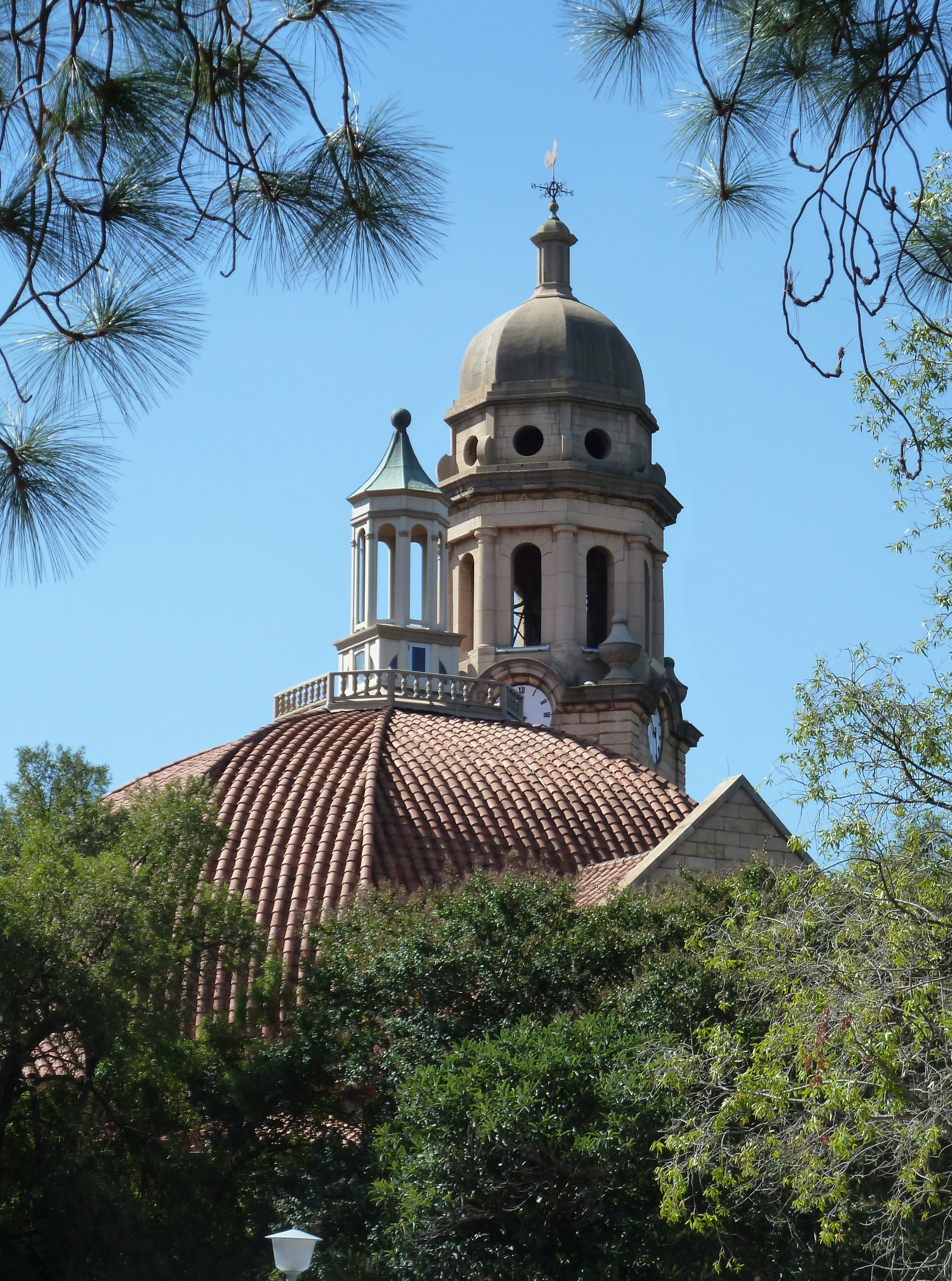
Ooskerk building in Pretoria

Among the places of worship, they are predominantly Christian churches and temples : Zion Christian Church, Apostolic Faith Mission of South Africa, Assemblies of God, Baptist Union of Southern Africa (Baptist World Alliance), Methodist Church of Southern Africa (World Methodist Council), Anglican Church of Southern Africa (Anglican Communion), Presbyterian Church of Africa (World Communion of Reformed Churches), Roman Catholic Archdiocese of Pretoria (Catholic Church). Greek Orthodox Community of Pretoria, Cathedral of the Annunciation of the Theotokos There are also Muslim mosques and Hindu temples.

=== Jewish community ===
Pretoria has a small Jewish community of around 3,000. Jewish citizens have been in Pretoria since its foundation in the 19th century and played an important role in its industrial and economic growth. A Mr. De Vries, the first Jewish inhabitant of Pretoria, was a prominent citizen and prosecutor, a member of the Volksraad and a pioneer of the Afrikaans language. Another famed Jewish Pretorian was Sammy Marks.

Other early Jewish settlers, many of them immigrants from Lithuania, were not as educated as De Vries and often did not speak Dutch, Afrikaans, or English. Many of them spoke only Yiddish and made a living as shopkeepers in the local retail industry. Most Jewish residents stayed neutral in the Second Boer War, though some joined the South African Republic army.

The first congregation was founded between 1890 and 1895, and in 1898 the first synagogue, The Old Synagogue opened on Paul Kruger Street. A second synagogue, known as the Great Synagogue, opened in 1922. Both synagogues are no longer in operation, but a Reformed synagogue, Temple Menorah, opened in the early 1950s.

The Jewish community of Pretoria's golden age was in the early 20th century, when many Jewish sports clubs, charities, and youth groups flourished. After 1948, many Jews left for Cape Town or Johannesburg.

The Old Synagogue on Paul Kruger Street was purchased by the government in 1952 to become the new home of the High Court where prominent opposition figures in the Anti-Apartheid Movement were tried, including Nelson Mandela, Walter Sisulu, and 26 others were prosecuted for treason from 1 August 1958 to 29 March 1961; the Rivonia Trial was held there in 1963–1964.

Two Jewish schools arose in Pretoria, the Miriam Marks School, which was founded in 1905, and the Carmel School, which opened in 1959. Only the second, currently also operating as a synagogue, remains. Pretoria's Reformed congregation shares a rabbi with the Johannesburg one, though the synagogue no longer operates and services take place in worshippers' private homes.

=== Buddhist community ===
A Buddhist centre, the Jang Chup Chopel Rigme Centre ("Centre of Light") was founded in early January 2015 by Duan Pienaar or Gyalten Nyima (his adopted monastic name) in Waverley around Pretoria-Moot. Pienaar is the only Afrikaner ordained in the highly selective Tibetan Tantric Buddhist community in Bylakuppe, in southern India. His instructor Lama Kyabje Choden Rinpoche is the highest tantric master after the Dalai Lama. Pienaar, who studied Buddhist teachers for twenty years, spent two years in India.

=== Coat of arms ===
Pretoria civic coat of arms (1907)

The Pretoria civic arms, designed by Frans Engelenburg, were granted by the College of Arms on 7 February 1907. They were registered with the Transvaal Provincial Administration in March 1953 and at the Bureau of Heraldry in May 1968. The Bureau provided new artwork, in a more modern style, in 1989.

The arms were: Gules, on an mimosa tree eradicated proper within an orle of eight bees volant, Or, an inescutcheon Or and thereon a Roman praetor seated proper. In layman's terms: a red shield displaying an uprooted mimosa tree surrounded by a border of eight golden bees, superimposed on the tree is a golden shield depicting a Roman praetor. The tree represented growth, the bees industry, and the praetor (judge) was an heraldic pun on the name.

The crest was a three-towered golden castle; the supporters were an eland and a kudu; and the motto Praestantia praevaleat Pretoria. The coat of arms have gone out of favour after the City Council amalgamated with its surrounding councils to form the City of Tshwane Metropolitan Municipality.

== Education ==
=== Primary education ===
- Crawford College
- St. Mary's Diocesan School for Girls

=== Secondary education ===
- Afrikaanse Hoër Meisieskool
- Afrikaanse Hoër Seunskool
- Christian Brothers' College
- Clapham High School
- Cornwall Hill College
- Crawford College
- The Glen High School
- Hillview High School
- Hoërskool Akasia
- Hoërskool Die Wilgers
- Hoërskool Garsfontein
- Hoërskool Menlopark
- Hoërskool Montana
- Hoërskool Oos-Moot
- Hoërskool Overkruin
- Hoërskool Waterkloof
- Hoërskool Wonderboom
- Pretoria Boys High School
- Pretoria Chinese School
- Pretoria High School for Girls
- Pretoria North High School
- Pretoria Secondary School
- Pro Arte Alphen Park
- St. Alban's College
- St. Mary's Diocesan School for Girls
- Tshwane Muslim School
- Willowridge High School
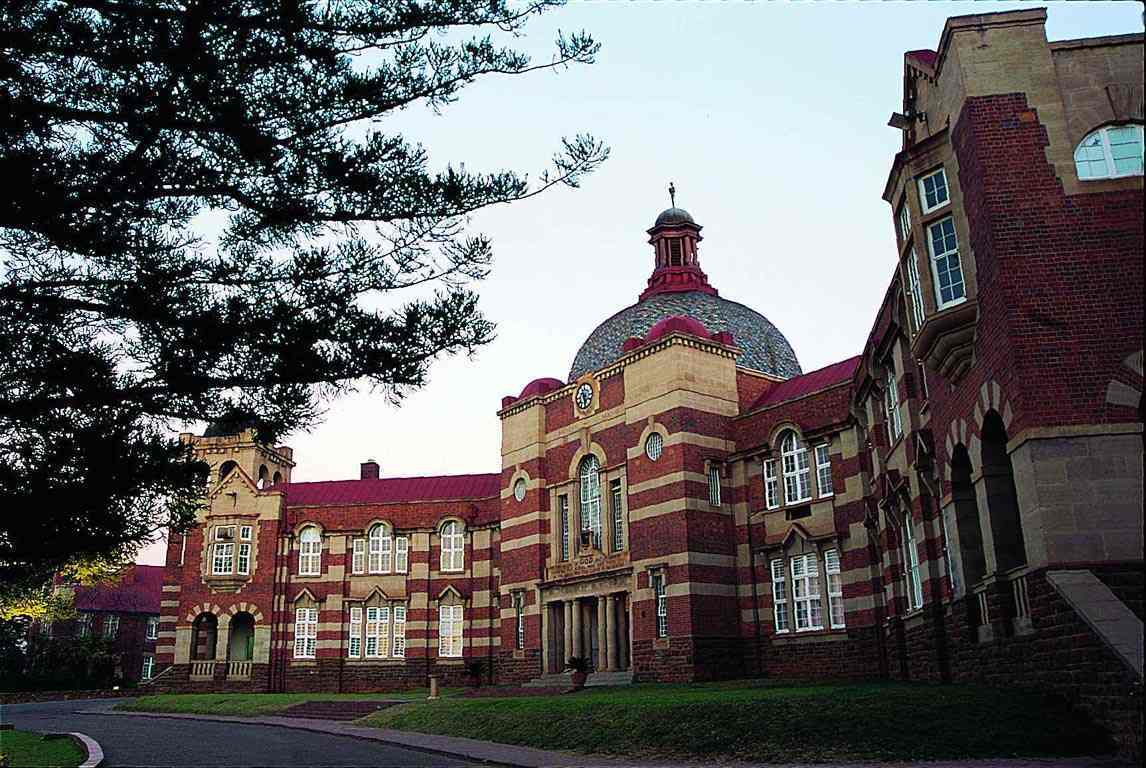
Pretoria Boys High School

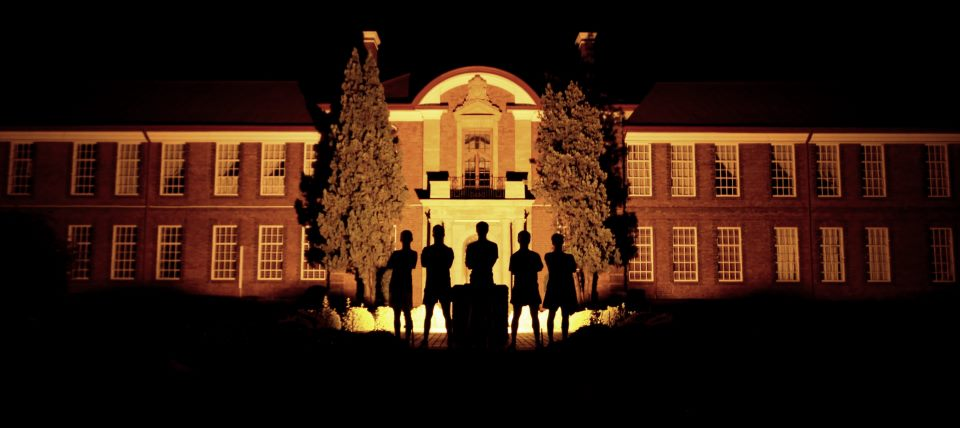
Afrikaanse Hoër Seunskool

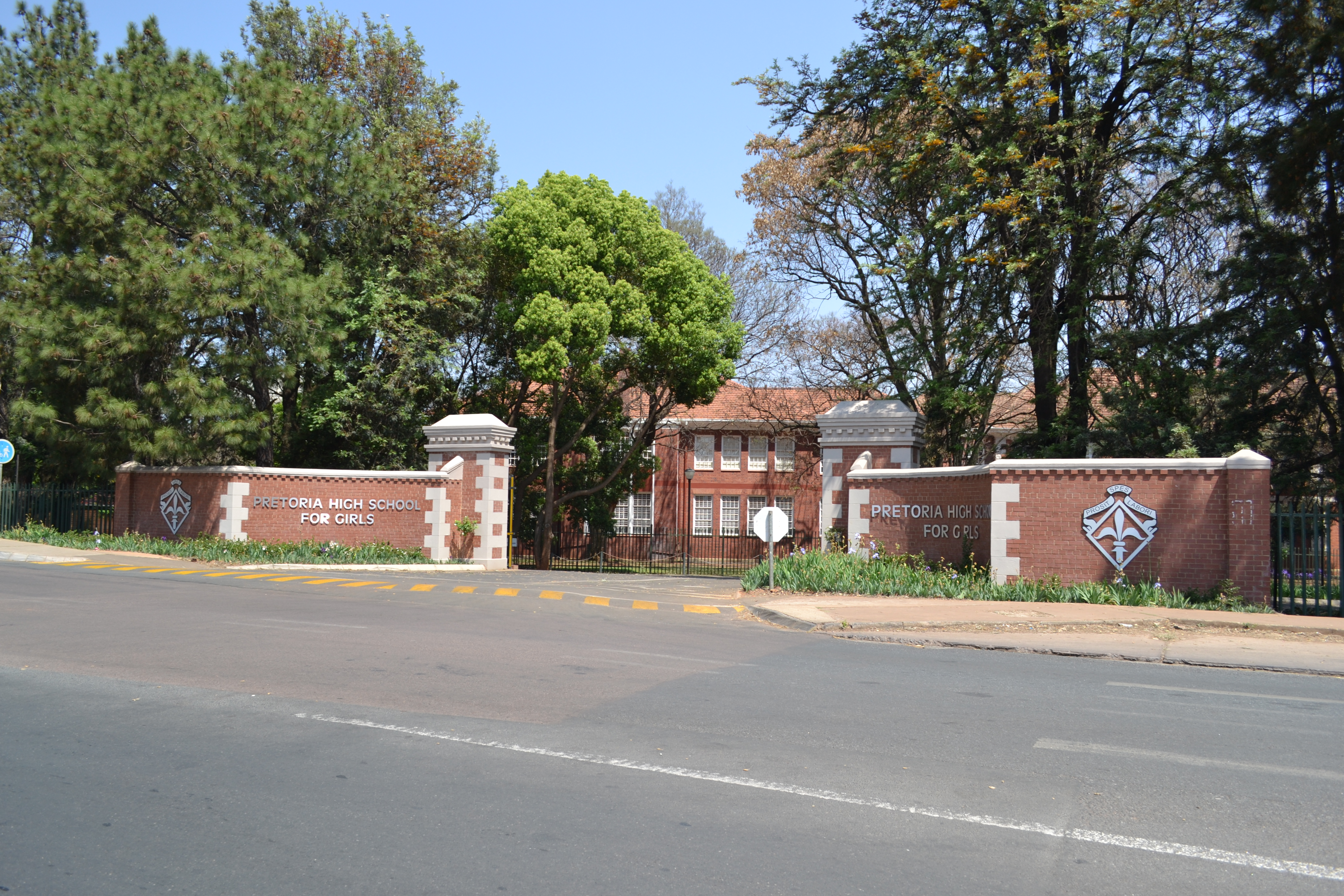
Pretoria High School for Girls

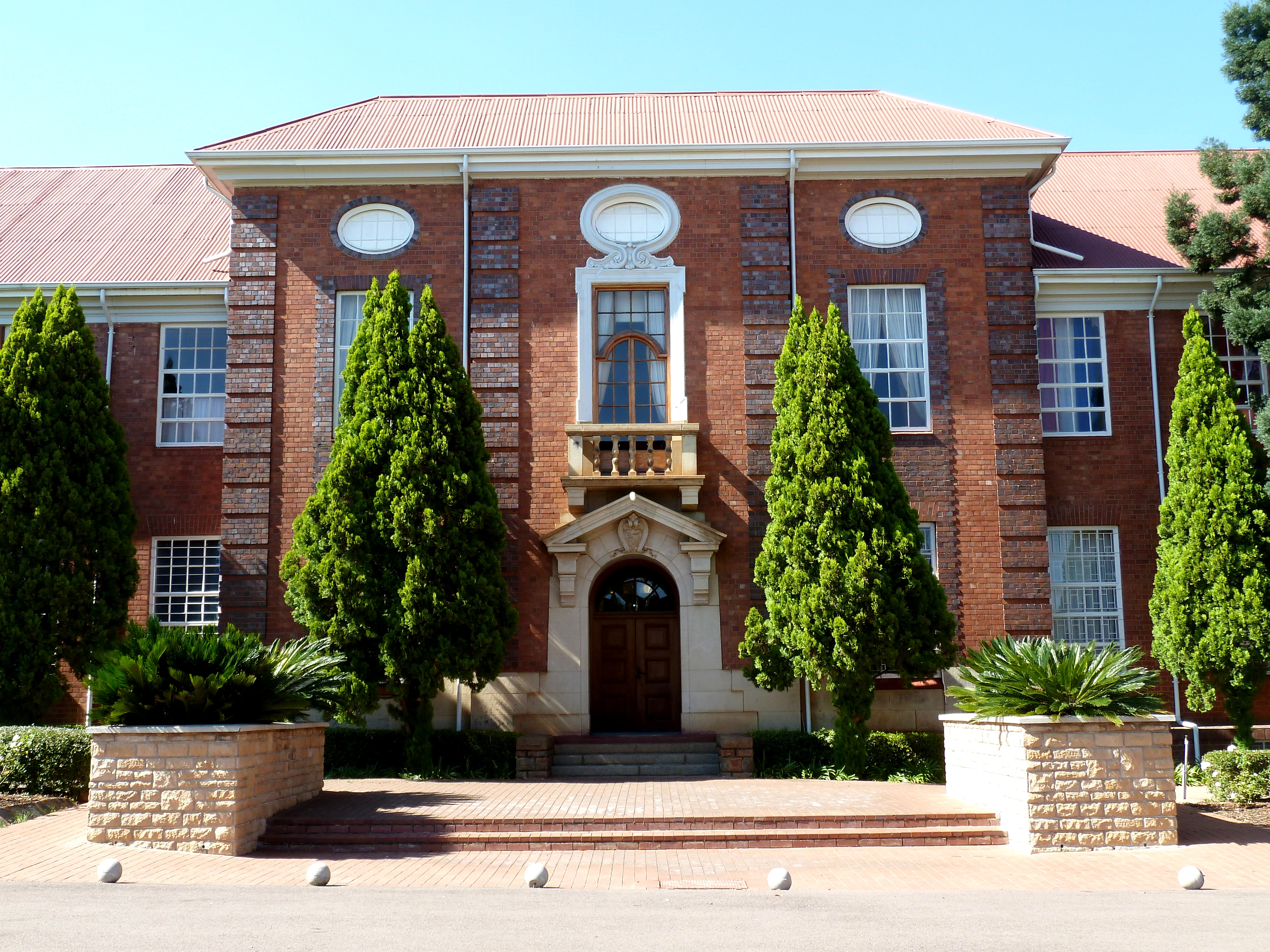
Afrikaanse Hoër Meisieskool

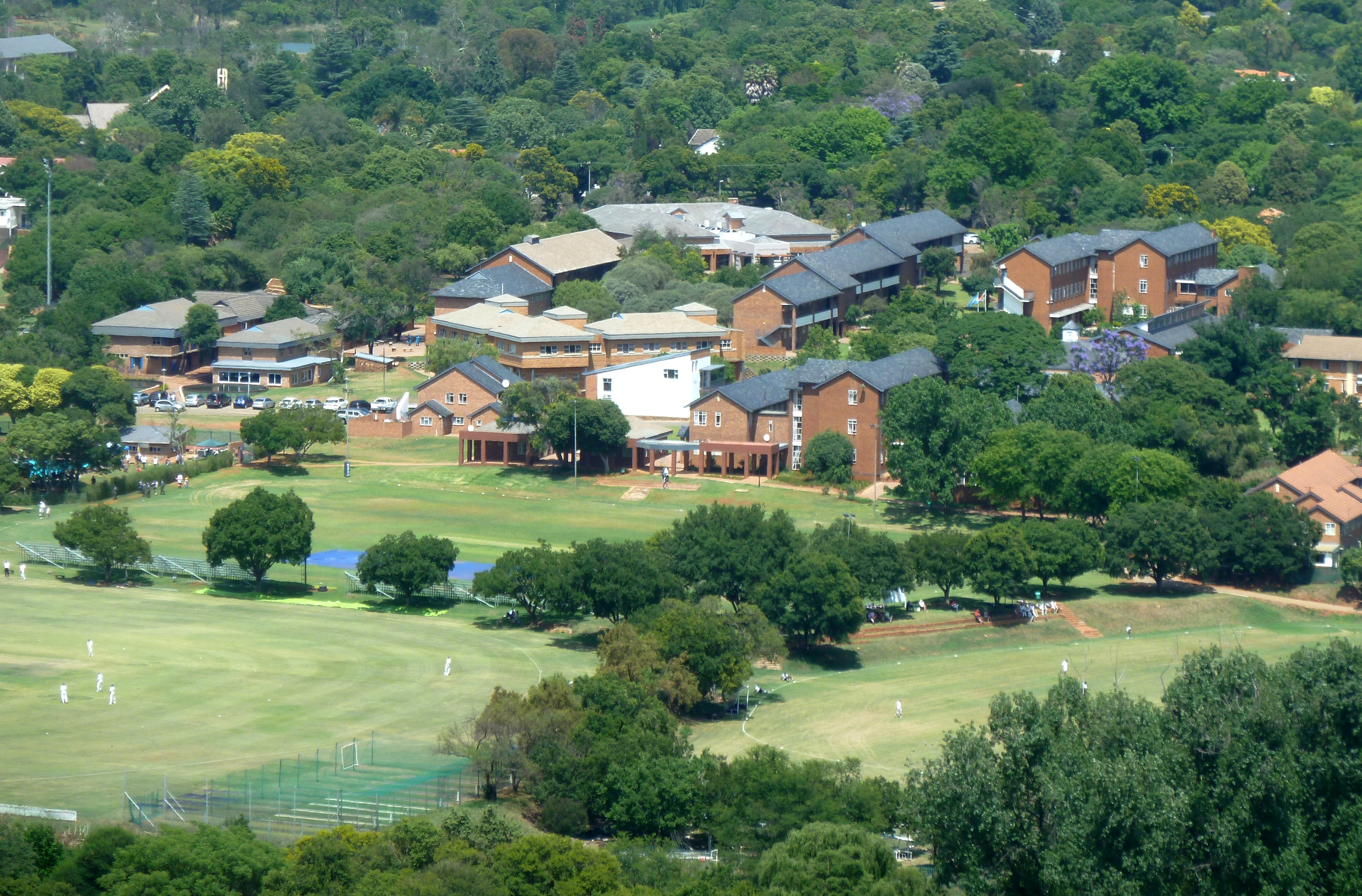
St. Alban's College

=== International schools ===
- École Miriam Makeba (French school)
- Deutsche Schule Pretoria (German school)
- AISJ-Pretoria

=== Tertiary education ===
Pretoria is one of South Africa's leading academic cities and is home to both the largest residential university in South Africa, largest distance education university in South Africa and a research intensive university. The three Universities in the city in order of the year founded are as follows:

==== University of South Africa ====
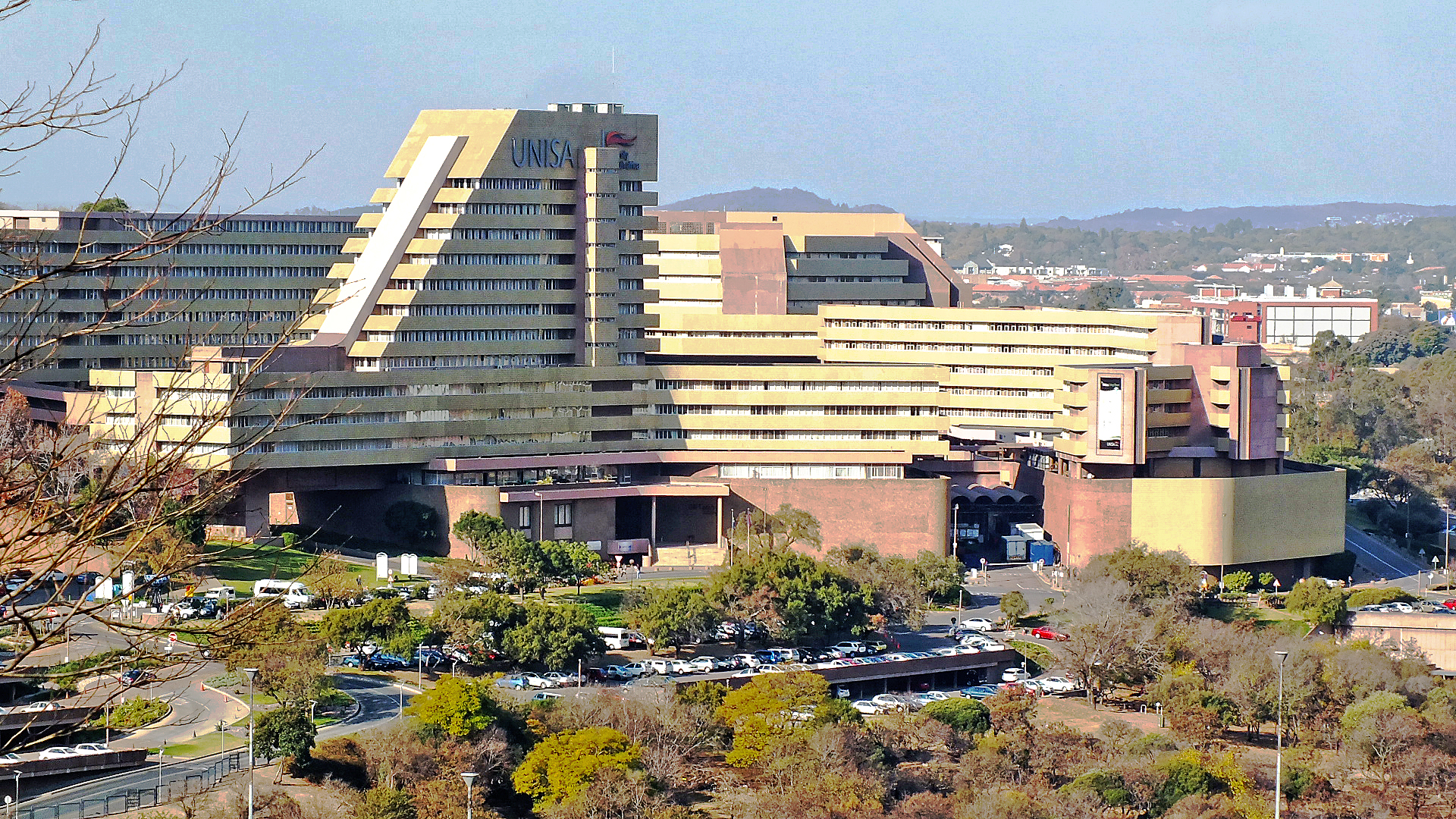
The Muckleneuk Campus of UNISA

The University of South Africa (commonly referred to as Unisa), founded in 1873 as the University of the Cape of Good Hope, is the largest university on the African continent and attracts a third of all higher education students in South Africa. It spent most of its early history as an examining agency for Oxford and Cambridge universities and as an incubator from which most other universities in South Africa are descended. In 1946 it was given a new role as a distance education university and in 2012 it had a student headcount of over 300,000 students, including African and international students in 130 countries worldwide, making it one of the world's mega universities. Unisa is a dedicated open distance education institution and offers both vocational and academic programmes.

==== University of Pretoria ====
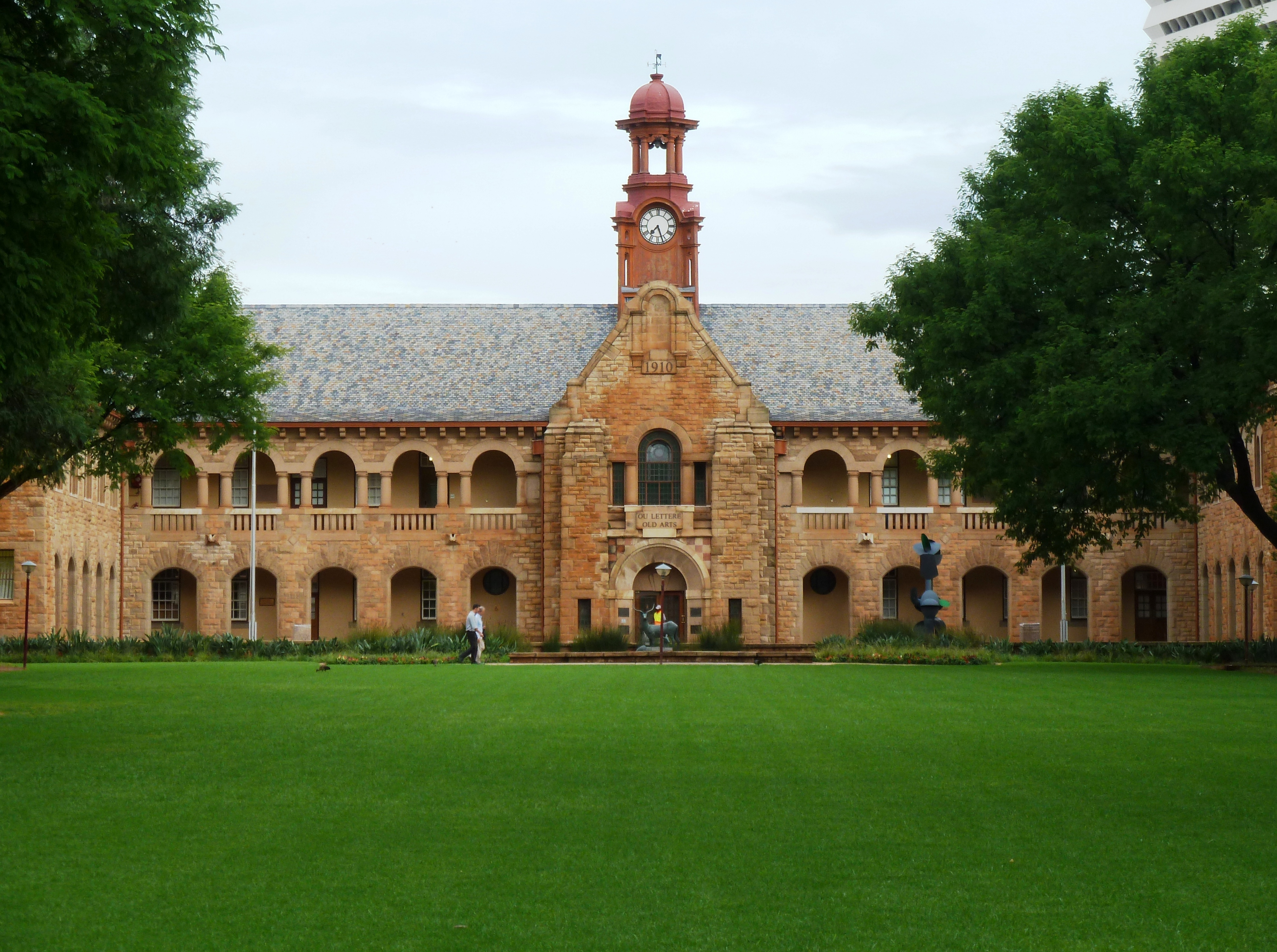
Old Arts Building (Ou Lettere Gebou) of the University of Pretoria

The University of Pretoria (commonly referred to as UP, Tuks, or Tukkies) is a multi campus public research university. The university was established in 1908 as the Pretoria campus of the Johannesburg based Transvaal University College and is the fourth South African institution in continuous operation to be awarded university status. Established in 1920, the University of Pretoria Faculty of Veterinary Science is the second oldest veterinary school in Africa and the only veterinary school in South Africa. In 1949 the university launched the first MBA programme outside of North America. Since 1997, the university has produced more research outputs every year than any other institution of higher learning in South Africa, as measured by the Department of Education's accreditation benchmark.

==== Tshwane University of Technology ====
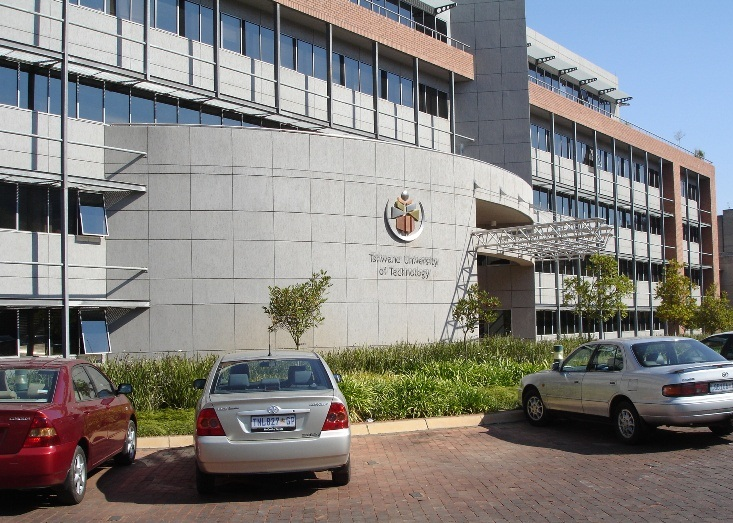
Tshwane University of Technology

The Tshwane University of Technology (commonly referred to as TUT) is a higher education institution, offering vocational oriented diplomas and degrees, and came into being through a merger of Technikon Northern Gauteng, Technikon North-West and Technikon Pretoria. TUT caters for approximately 60,000 students and it has become the largest residential higher education institution in South Africa.

=== CSIR ===
The Council for Scientific and Industrial Research (CSIR) is South Africa's central scientific research and development organisation. It was established by an act of parliament in 1945 and is situated on its own campus in the city. It is the largest research and development organisation in Africa and accounts for about 10% of the entire African R&D budget. It has a staff of approximately 3,000 technical and scientific researchers, often working in multi-disciplinary teams. In 2002, Sibusiso Sibisi was appointed as the president and CEO of the CSIR.

== Military ==
Pretoria has earned a reputation as being the centre of South Africa's Military and is home to several military facilities of the South African National Defence Force:

=== Military headquarters ===
==== Transito Air Force Headquarters ====
This complex is the headquarters to the South African Air Force.

==== The Dequar Road Complex ====
A military complex that houses the following:

- South African Army's Headquarters
- South African Infantry Formation HQ
- A General Support Base
- Support Formation HQ
- Training Formation HQ
- The 102 Field Workshop unit
- The 17 Maintenance Unit
- The S.A.M.S Military Health Department

==== The Sebokeng Complex ====
A military complex located on the corner of Patriot Street and Koraalboom Road that houses the following military headquarters:

- South African Army Armour Formation HQ
- South African Army Artillery Formation HQ
- South African Army Intelligence Corps HQ
- South African Army Air Defence Artillery Formation HQ

=== Military bases ===
==== The Dequar Road Base ====
This base is situated in the suburb of Salvokop and is divided into two parts:

- The Green Magazine (Groen Magazyn) which is the Headquarters to the Transvaalse Staatsartillerie, a reserve artillery regiment of the South African Army
- Magazine Hill which is the regimental Headquarters to the Pretoria Armoured Regiment, a reserve tank regiment of the South African Army

==== Thaba Tshwane ====
Thaba Tshwane is a large military area south-west of the Pretoria Central Business District and North of Air Force Base Swartkop. It is the headquarters of several army units-

- Joint Support Base Garrison that is responsible for the town management of Thaba Tshwane
- The Tshwane Regiment, a reserve motorised infantry regiment of the South African Army
- The 18 Light Regiment, a reserve artillery regiment of the South African Army
- The National Ceremonial Guard and Band

The military base also houses the 1 Military Hospital and the Military Police School. Within Thaba Tshwane, a facility known as "TEK Base" exists which houses its own units:

- The SA Army Engineer Formation
- 2 Parachute Battalion
- 44 Parachute Engineer Regiment
- 1 Military Printing Regiment
- 4 Survey and Map Regiment

==== Joint Support Base Wonderboom ====
The Wonderboom Military Base is located adjacent to the Wonderboom Airport and is the headquarters of the South African Army Signals Formation. It also houses the School of Signals, 1 Signal Regiment, 2 Signal Regiment, 3 Electronic Workshop, 4 Signal Regiment and 5 Signal Regiment.

==== Military colleges ====
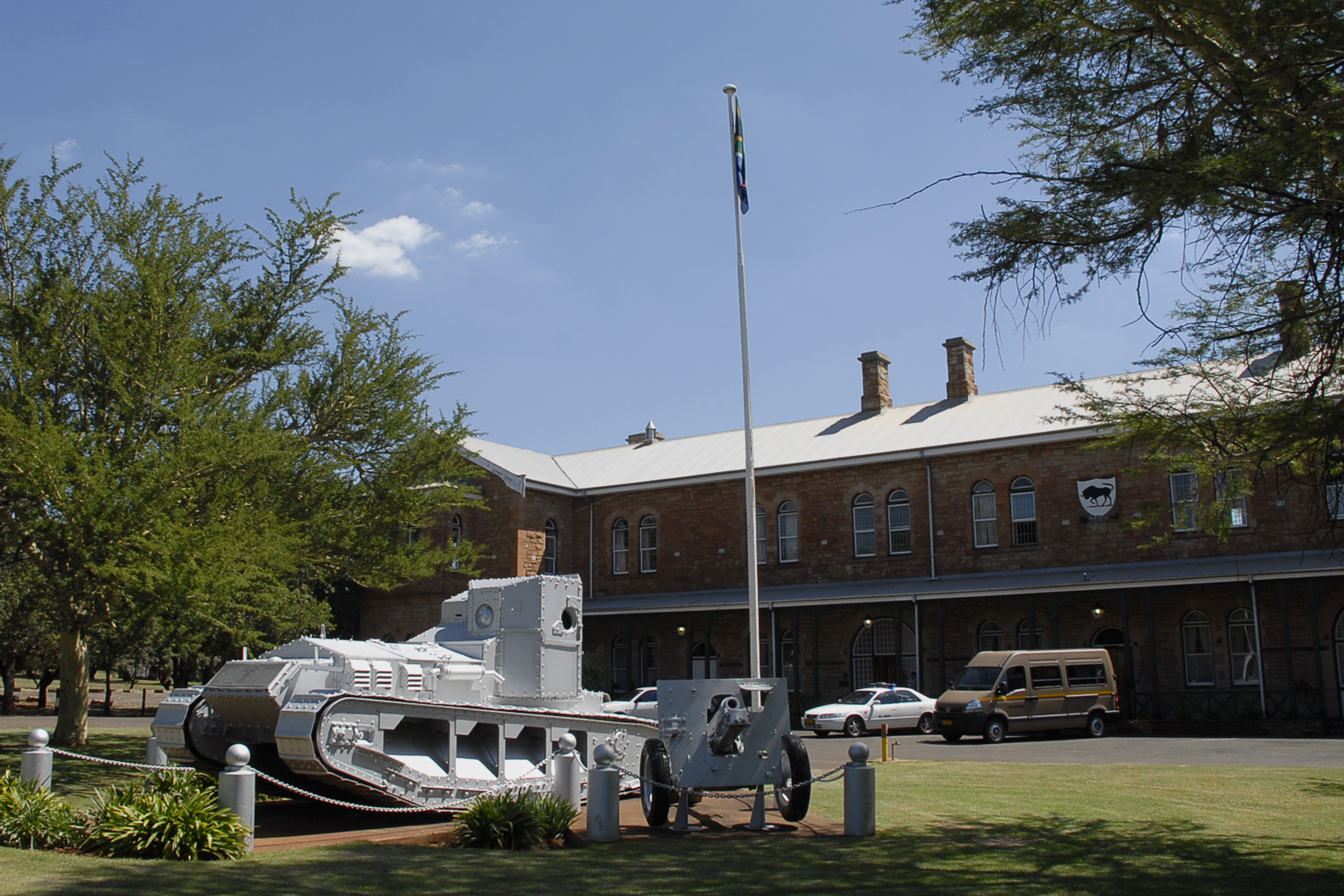
The South African Army College in Pretoria

The South African Air Force College, the South African Military Health Service School for Military Health Training and the South African Army College are situated in the Thaba Tshwane Military Base and are used to train Commissioned and Non-commissioned Officers to perform effectively in combat/command roles in the various branches of the South African National Defence Force. The South African Defence Intelligence College is also located in the Sterrewag Suburb north of Air Force Base Waterkloof.

=== Air force bases ===
While technically not within the city limits of Pretoria, Air Force Base Swartkop and Air Force Base Waterkloof are often used for defence related matters within the city. These may include aerial military transport duties within the city, aerospace monitoring and defence as well as VIP transport to and from the city.

== Proposed change of name ==
On 26 May 2005 the South African Geographical Names Council (SAGNC), which is linked to the Directorate of Heritage in the Department of Arts and Culture, approved changing the name of Pretoria to Tshwane, which is already the name of the Metropolitan Municipality in which Pretoria and a number of surrounding cities are located. Although the name change was approved by the SAGNC, it was not approved by the Minister of Arts and Culture, who at the time requested further research on the matter. Should the Minister approve the name change, the name will be published in the Government Gazette, giving the public opportunity to comment on the matter. The Minister can then refer that public response back to the SAGNC before presenting a recommendation before parliament for a vote. Various public interest groups warned that any name change would be challenged in court, should the minister approve it. The long process involved made a name change less likely.

The Tshwane Metro Council had advertised "Africa's leading capital city" as Tshwane since the SAGNC decision in 2005. This has led to further controversy, however, as the name of the city had not yet been changed, and the council was, at best, acting prematurely. When a complaint was lodged with the Advertising Standards Authority (ASA), it ruled that such advertisements are deliberately misleading and should be withdrawn from all media. Despite the rulings of the ASA, Tshwane Metro Council failed to discontinue their "City of Tshwane" advertisements. As a result, the ASA requested that Tshwane Metro pay for advertisements in which it admits that it has misled the public. After refusing to abide by the ASA's request, the Metro Council was banned from placing any advertisements in the South African media that refer to the capital as Tshwane. The ASA could still place additional sanctions on the Metro Council that would prevent it from placing any advertisements in the South African media, including council notices and employment vacancies.

After the ruling, the Metro Council continued to place Tshwane advertisements, but placed them on council-owned advertising boards and bus stops throughout the municipal area. In August 2007, an internal memo was leaked to the media in which the Tshwane mayor sought advice from the premier of Gauteng on whether the municipality could be called the "City of Tshwane" instead of just "Tshwane". This would increase confusion about the distinction between the city of Pretoria and the municipality of Tshwane.

In early 2010 it was again rumoured that the South African government would make a decision regarding the name; however, a media briefing regarding name changes, which could have been an opportunity to discuss it, was cancelled shortly before taking place. Rumours of the name change provoked outrage from Afrikaner civil rights and political groups. It later emerged that the registration of the municipality as a geographic place had been published in the Government Gazette as it had been too late to withdraw the name from the publication, but it was announced that the name had been withdrawn, pending "further work" by officials. The following week, the registration of "Tshwane" was officially withdrawn in the Government Gazette. The retraction had reportedly been ordered at the behest of the Deputy President of South Africa Kgalema Motlanthe, acting on behalf of President Jacob Zuma, as minister of Arts and Culture Lulu Xingwana had acted contrary to the position of the ANC, which is that Pretoria and the municipality are separate entities, which was subsequently articulated by ANC secretary general Gwede Mantashe.

In March 2010 a group supporting the name change, calling themselves the "Tshwane Royal House Committee", claimed to be descendants of Chief Tshwane and demanded to be made part of the administration of the municipality.

According to comments made by Mayor Kgosientso Ramokgopa in late 2011, the change would occur in 2012. However, there remained considerable uncertainty about the issue. As of 2026, the proposed name change has not occurred.

== International relations ==
=== Twin towns – sister cities ===
Pretoria is twinned with:

- Amman, Jordan
- Baku, Azerbaijan
- Bucharest, Romania
- Bulawayo, Zimbabwe
- Huế, Vietnam
- Kumasi, Ghana
- Kyiv, Ukraine
- Port Louis, Mauritius
- Taipei, Taiwan
- Tehran, Iran
- Washington, D.C., United States

== Notable people ==
- Anel Alexander, actress
- Frances Ames (1920–2002), neurologist, psychiatrist and human rights activist
- Melinda Bam, Miss South Africa 2011
- Johan Barkhuizen, cricketer
- Margaret Becklake (1922–2018), academic and epidemiologist
- Daniel Bekker, athlete
- Deanne Bergsma, dancer
- Conrad Bo, artist
- Roelof Botha, venture capitalist
- Wim Botha, artist
- Robert Broom (1866–1951), palaeontologist
- Rory Byrne, Chief designer at the Benetton and Scuderia Ferrari Formula One teams
- Jan-Henning Campher – Rugby union player
- Sharlto Copley, actor
- Kurt Darren, singer/songwriter
- Enid de Chair, First Lady of New South Wales, art patron, and artist
- Rassie van der Dussen, cricketer
- Damon Galgut, Booker Prize-winning author
- Branden Grace, golfer
- Nigel Green, actor
- George Gristock, Victoria Cross recipient
- Steve Hofmeyr, singer, songwriter and actor
- Bobby van Jaarsveld, South African singer/songwriter
- Glynis Johns (1923–2024), actress
- Gé Korsten, opera tenor and actor
- Anneline Kriel, Miss South Africa 1974 & Miss World 1974
- Paul Kruger (1825–1904), president of the South African Republic
- Michael Levitt (born 1947), Nobel prizewinning biophysicist
- Thomas Madigage, soccer player
- Tony Maggs, Formula 1 driver
- Vusi Mahlasela, singer/songwriter
- Justice Mahomed, former Chief Justice of South Africa, co-authored the constitution of Namibia
- Magnus Malan, Minister of Defence in the cabinet of President P. W. Botha
- DJ Maphorisa, DJ and record producer
- Eugène Marais, lawyer, naturalist, poet and writer
- Sammy Marks, entrepreneur
- Herman Mashaba, the former Mayor of Johannesburg
- Thulasizwe Mbuyane, soccer player
- Karin Melis Mey, athlete
- Marc Milligan, cricketer
- Tim Modise, journalist, TV and radio presenter
- Lucas Moripe, soccer player (Pretoria Callies FC)
- Chris Morris, cricketer
- Asleigh Moolman, cyclist
- Michelle Mosalakae, actress and theatre director
- Es'kia Mphahlele, writer, educator, artist and activist celebrated as the Father of African Humanism
- Helene Muller, athlete
- Elon Musk, entrepreneur and richest person in the world
- Kimbal Musk, entrepreneur
- Franco Naudé, rugby union player
- Sean Nowak, cricketer
- Micki Pistorius, profiler and author
- Oscar Pistorius, athlete and convicted murderer
- Dricus du Plessis, MMA fighter and former UFC champion
- Faf du Plessis, cricketer
- Louis Hendrik Potgieter, member of Dschinghis Khan pop band
- A-Reece, rapper
- Austin Roberts (1883–1948), zoologist
- Austin Stevens (born 1950), herpetologist, wildlife photographer, film maker and author
- Edith Frances Mary Struben, artist
- Grove Venter, cricketer
- Arnold Vosloo, actor
- Casper de Vries, comedian
- Joost van der Westhuizen, rugby union player
- Anton van Wouw, sculptor and artist
- 25k, rapper

== Places of interest ==
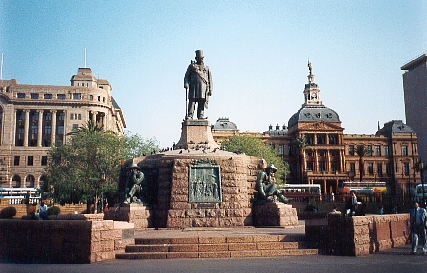
Statue of Paul Kruger on Church Square, Pretoria

- Pretoria National Botanical Garden, a botanical garden containing a massive collection of native flora.
- The National Zoological Gardens of South Africa, the premier zoological gardens of South Africa.
- Church Square, the historical governmental centre of the South African Republic.
- Union Buildings, the executive branch of the South African government.
- Mahlamba Ndlopfu, the official residence of the President of South Africa.
- Marabastad, a historical shopping district for non-whites during Apartheid.
- Menlyn Maine, a green city.
- Menlyn Park, a shopping mall.
- Voortrekker Monument, a historical complex dedicated to the Great Trek.
- Hatfield Square, the main student relaxation district.
- Pretoria railway station, a historical landmark and departure point for metrorail and Gautrain trains.
- Freedom Park, a historical complex dedicated to the end of Apartheid and the fallen soldiers of South Africa after 1994.
- Pretoria Forts, historical bastions designed to protect the city against the British, including a museum on the Boer Wars.
- State Theatre, South Africa, the premier national performing arts complex.
- Government House, Pretoria.
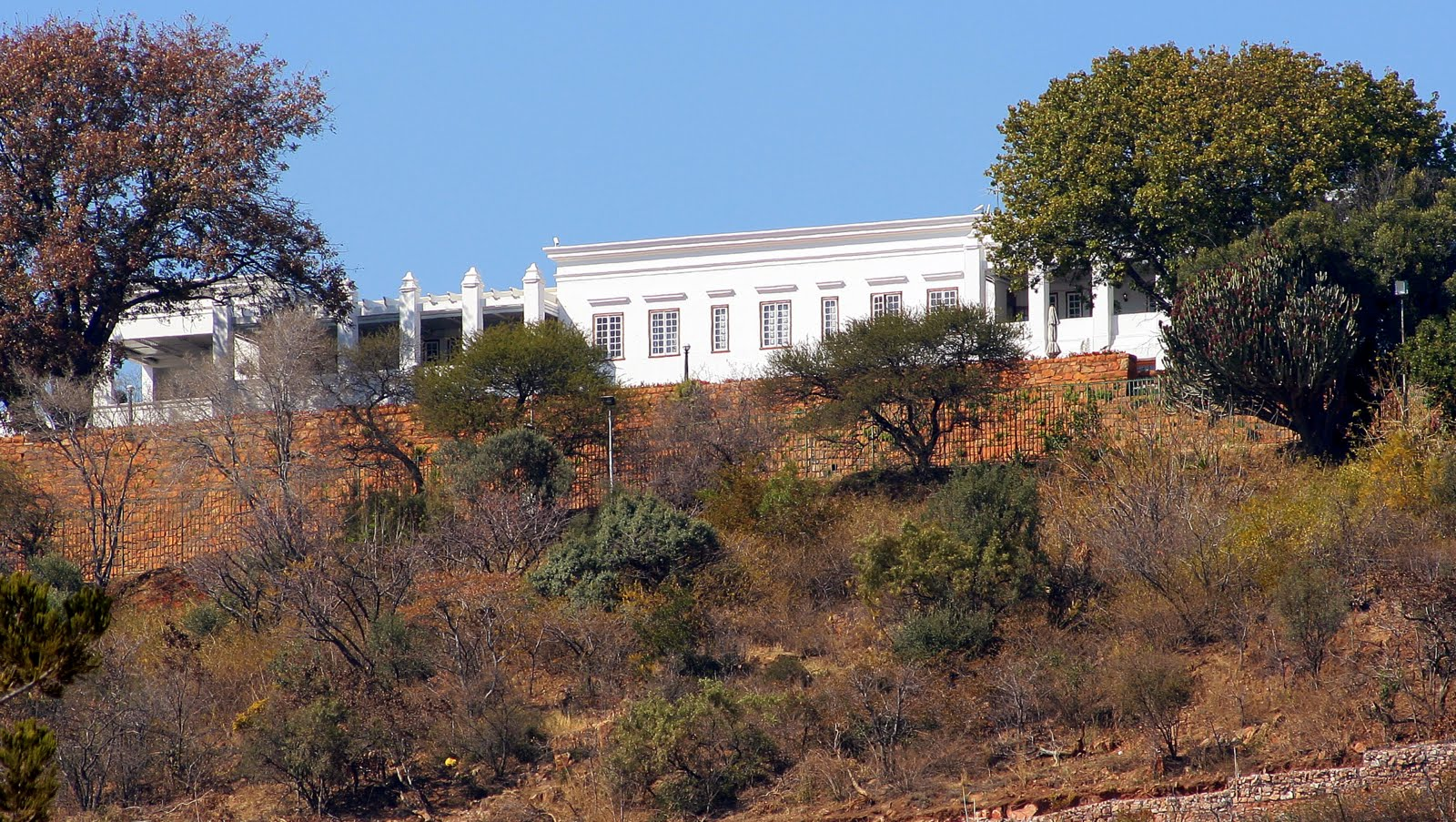
Official Residence of President of South Africa

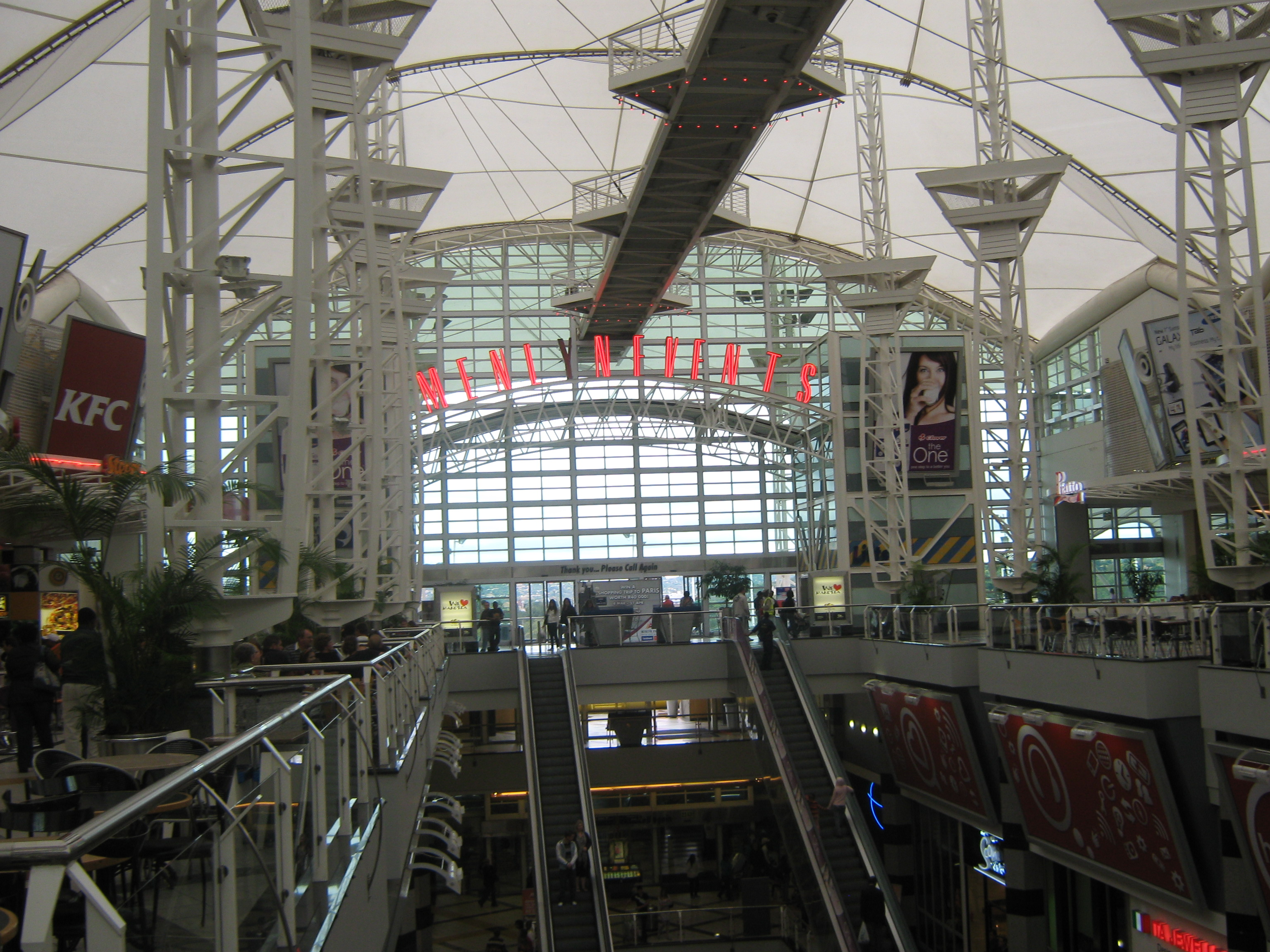
Menlyn Park

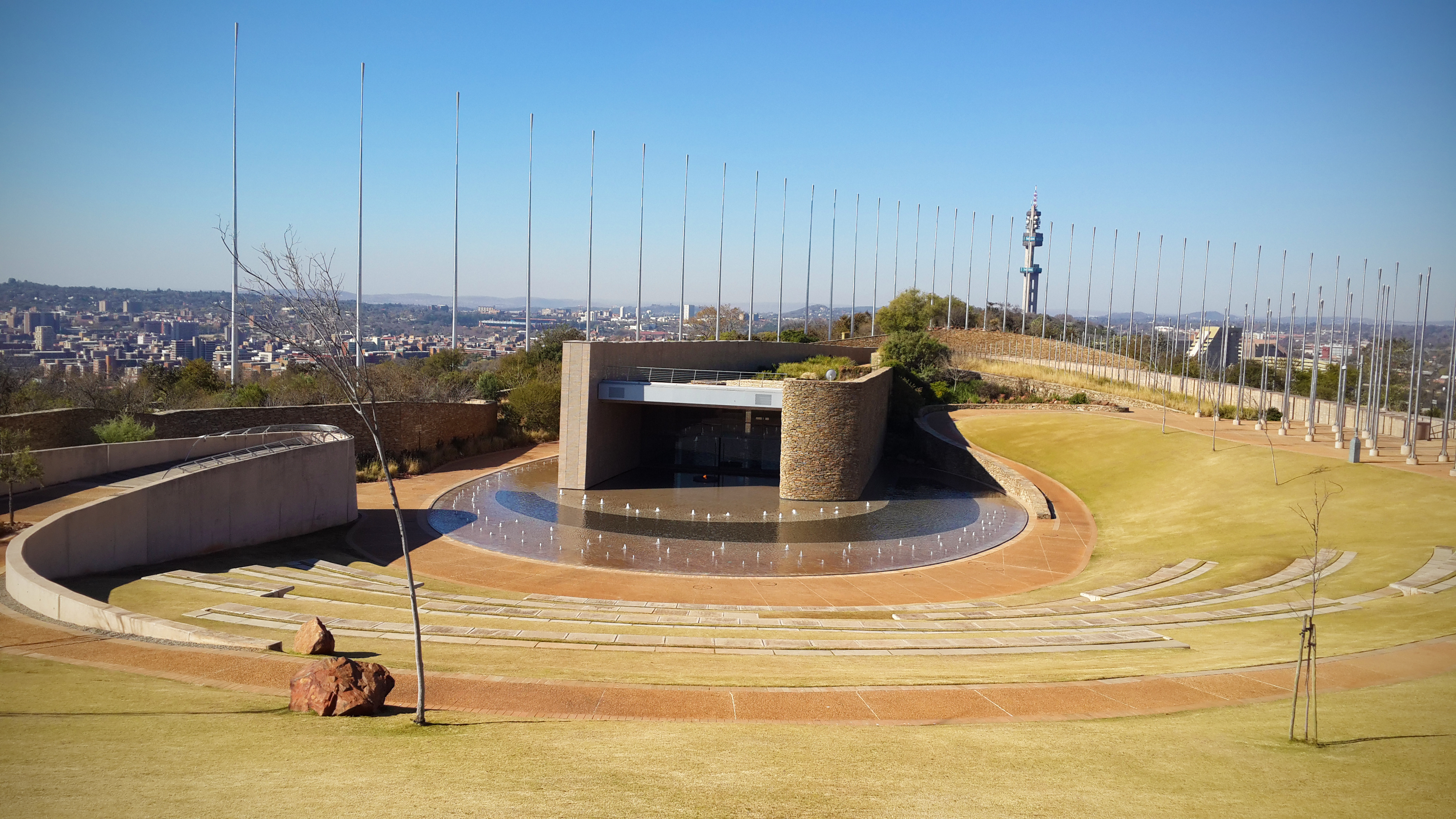
Freedom Park

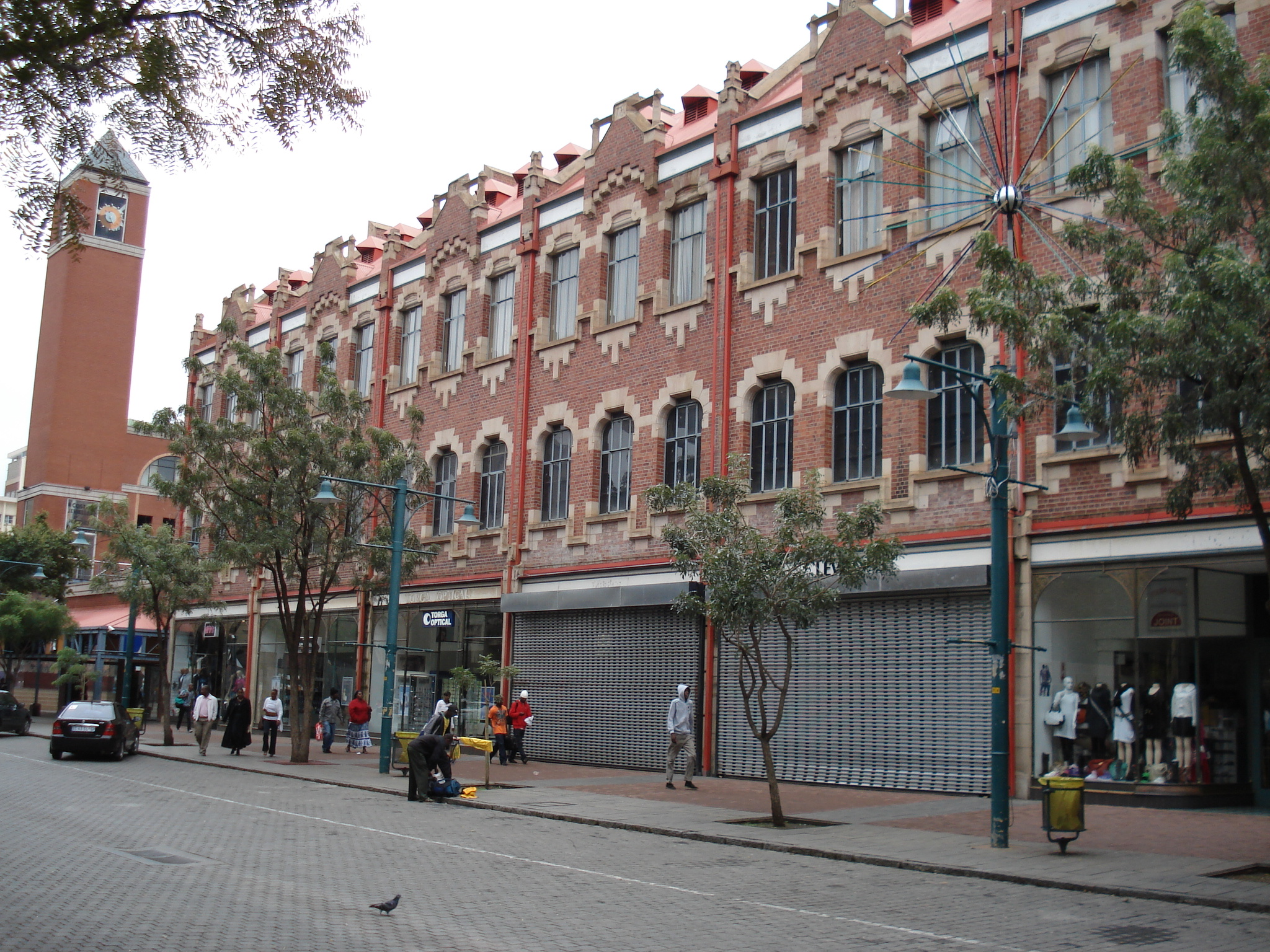
Sammy Marks square

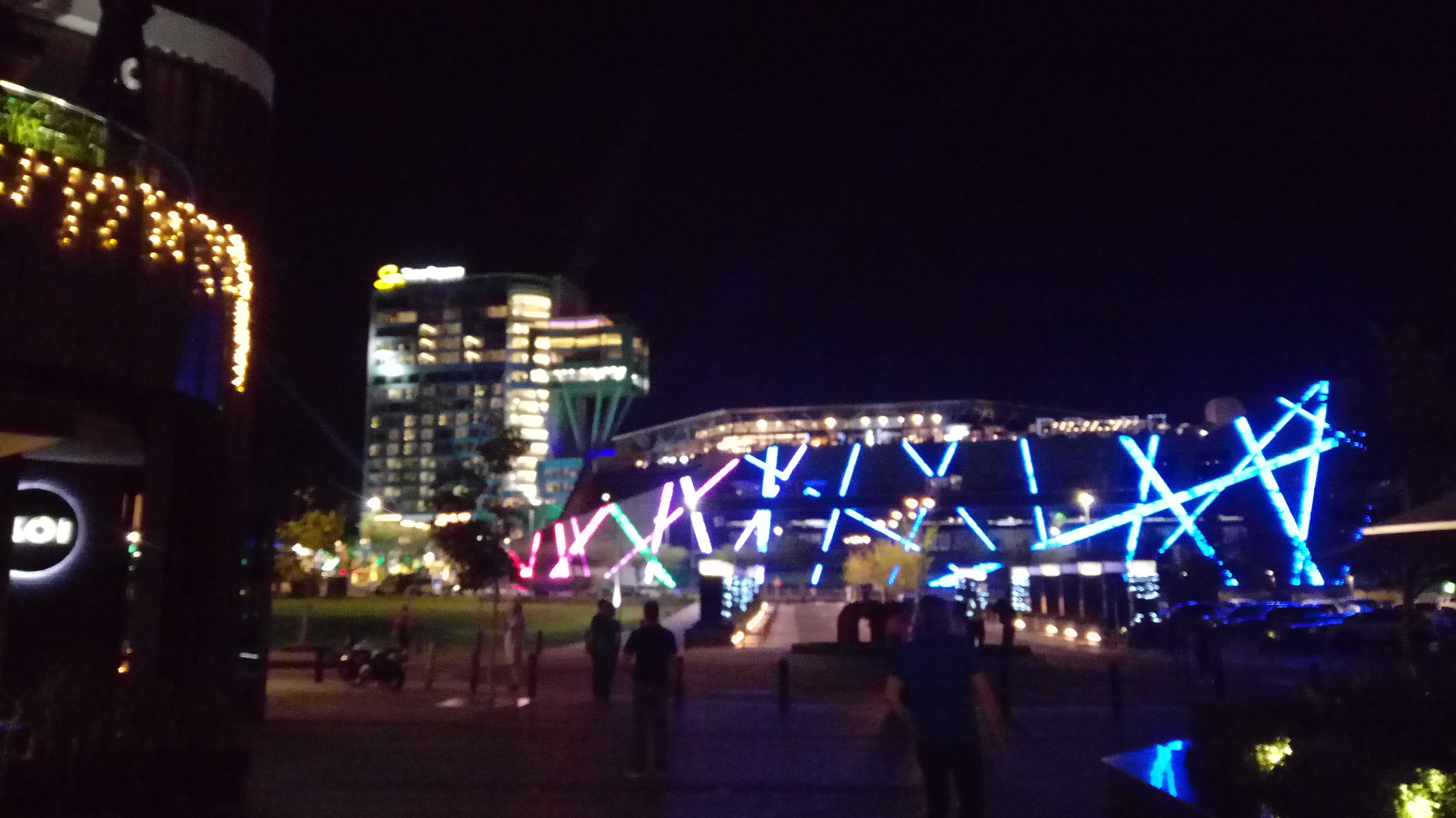
Times Square Casino, Menlyn Maine

=== Nature reserves ===
- Chamberlain Bird Sanctuary
- Faerie Glen Nature Reserve
- Groenkloof Nature Reserve
- Moreletaspruit Nature Reserve
- Rietvlei Nature Reserve
- Roodeplaat Dam Provincial Nature Reserve
- Wonderboom Nature Reserve
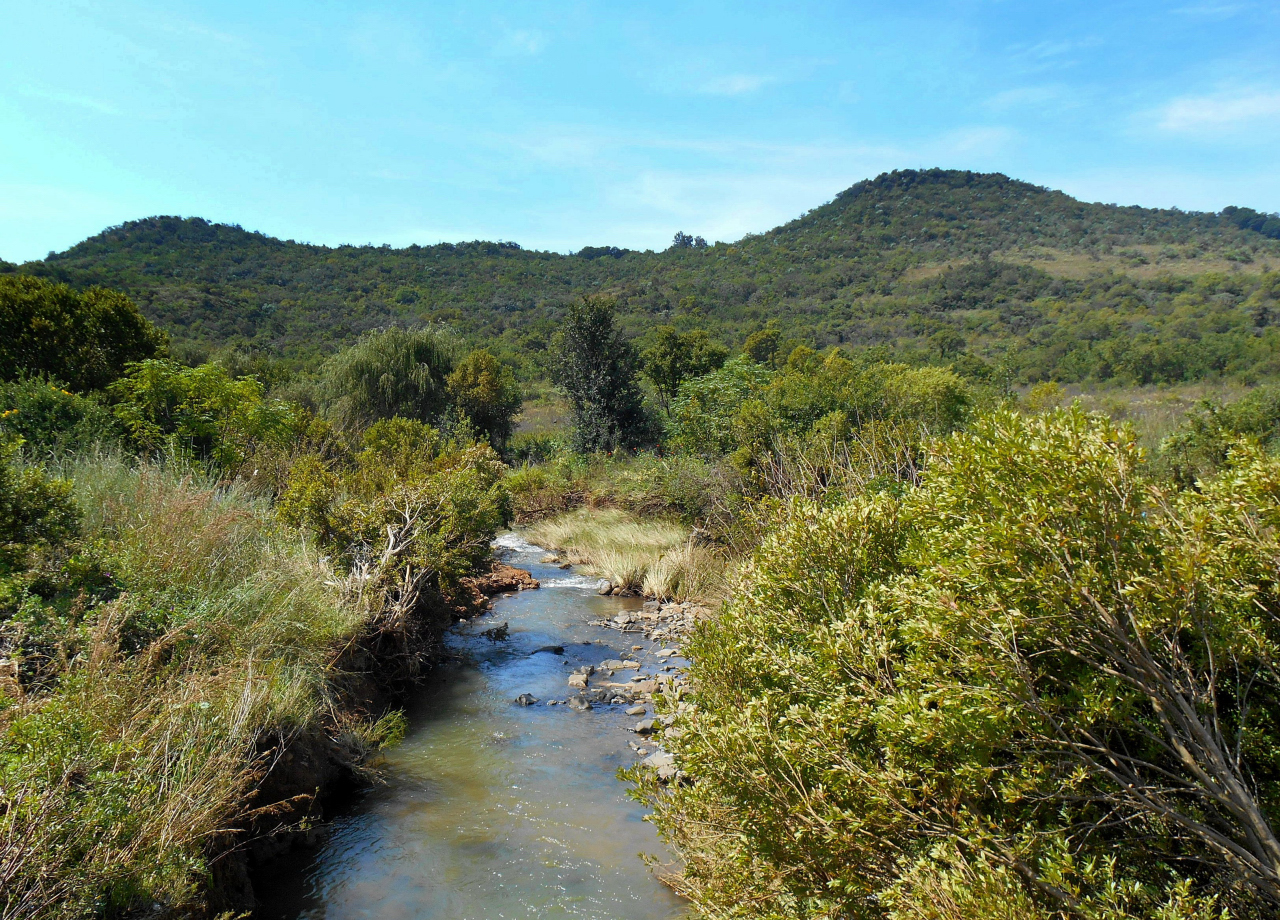
Faerie Glen Nature Reserve

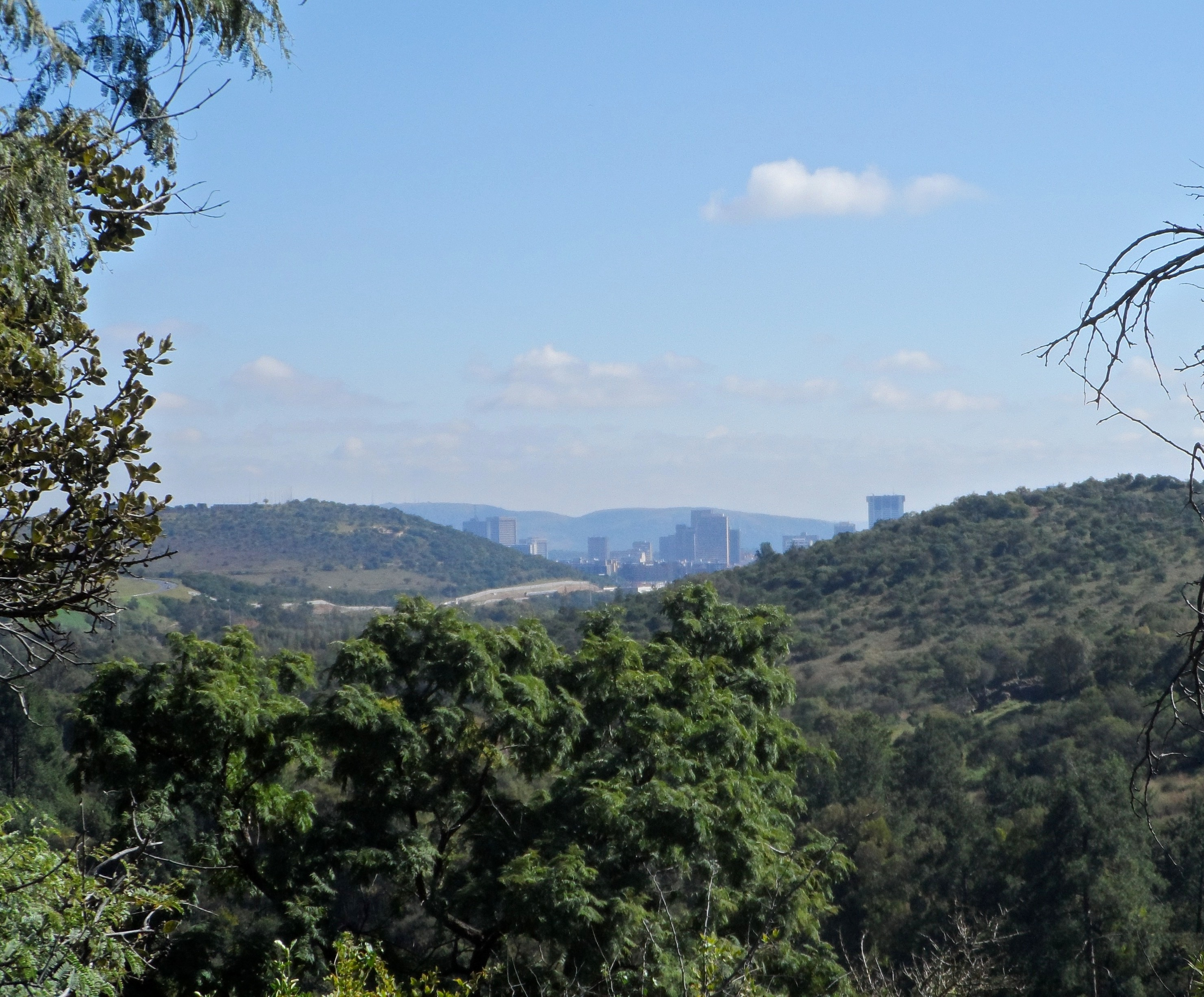
Groenkloof Nature Reserve

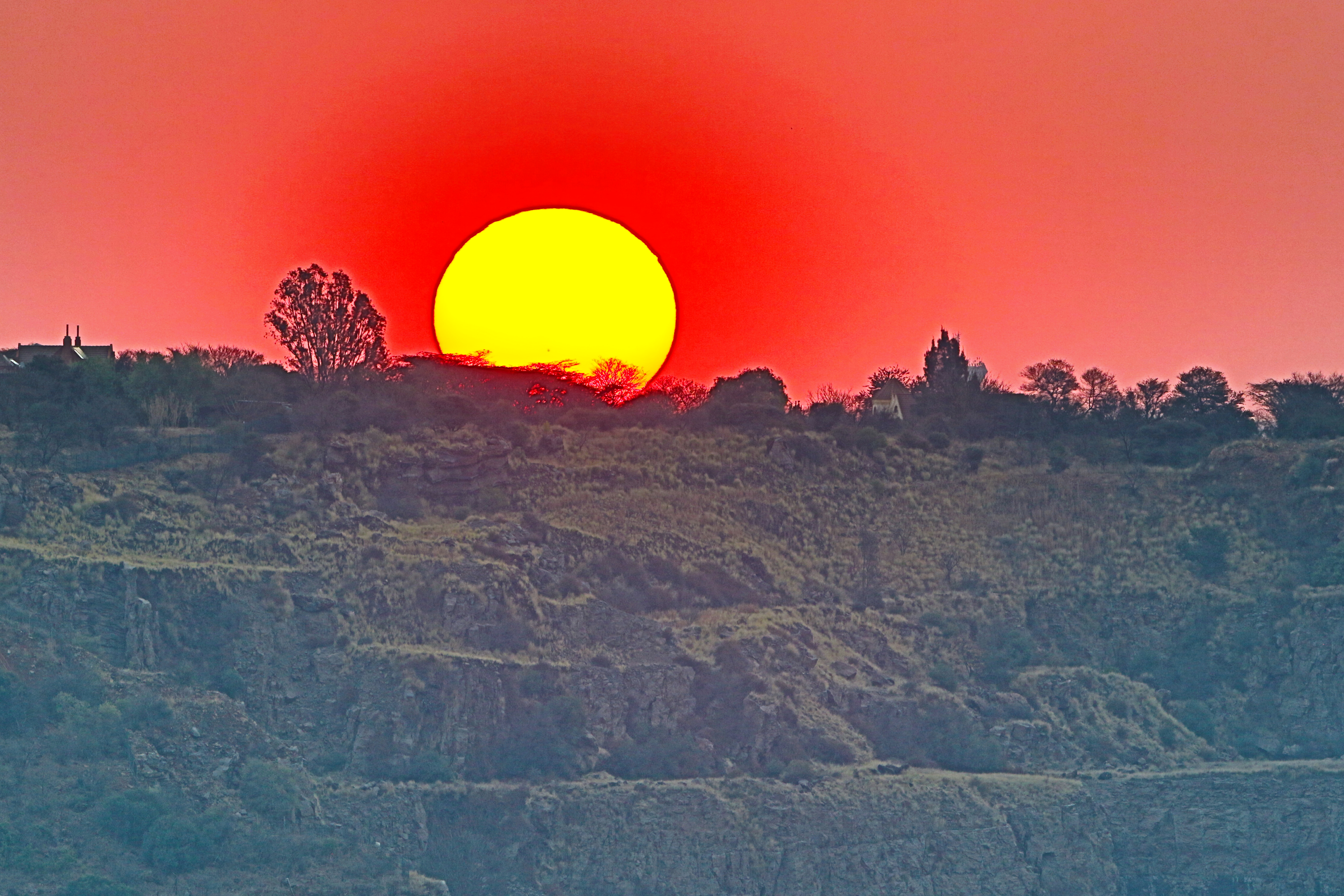
Rietvlei Nature Reserve

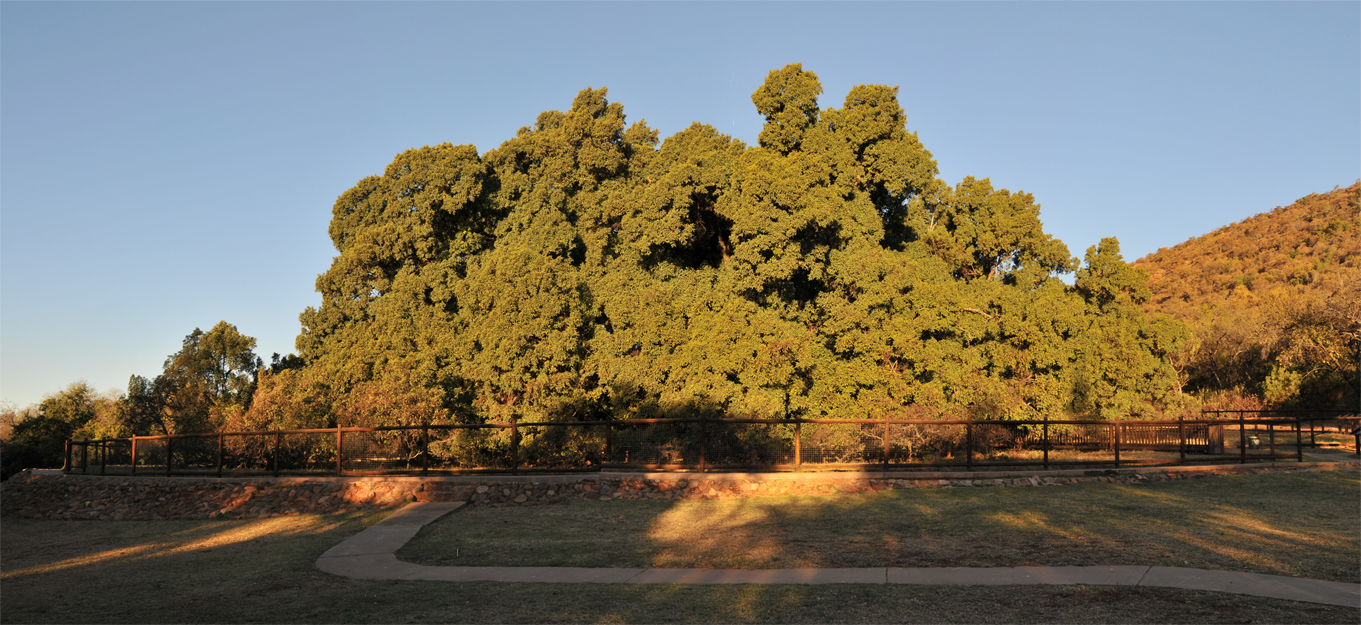
Wonderboom Grove

== See also ==
- Sir Herbert Baker
- Houses of Parliament, Cape Town
- Pretoria Wireless Users Group—a free, non-profit, community wireless network in Pretoria
- Supreme Court of Appeal of South Africa
