= Timeline of Pretoria =

The following is a timeline of the history of Pretoria, in the City of Tshwane Metropolitan Municipality, Gauteng province, South Africa.

== Ancient ==
- 200 000 year old artefacts found in a rock shelter on the Erasmus Castle property.

== 19th century ==
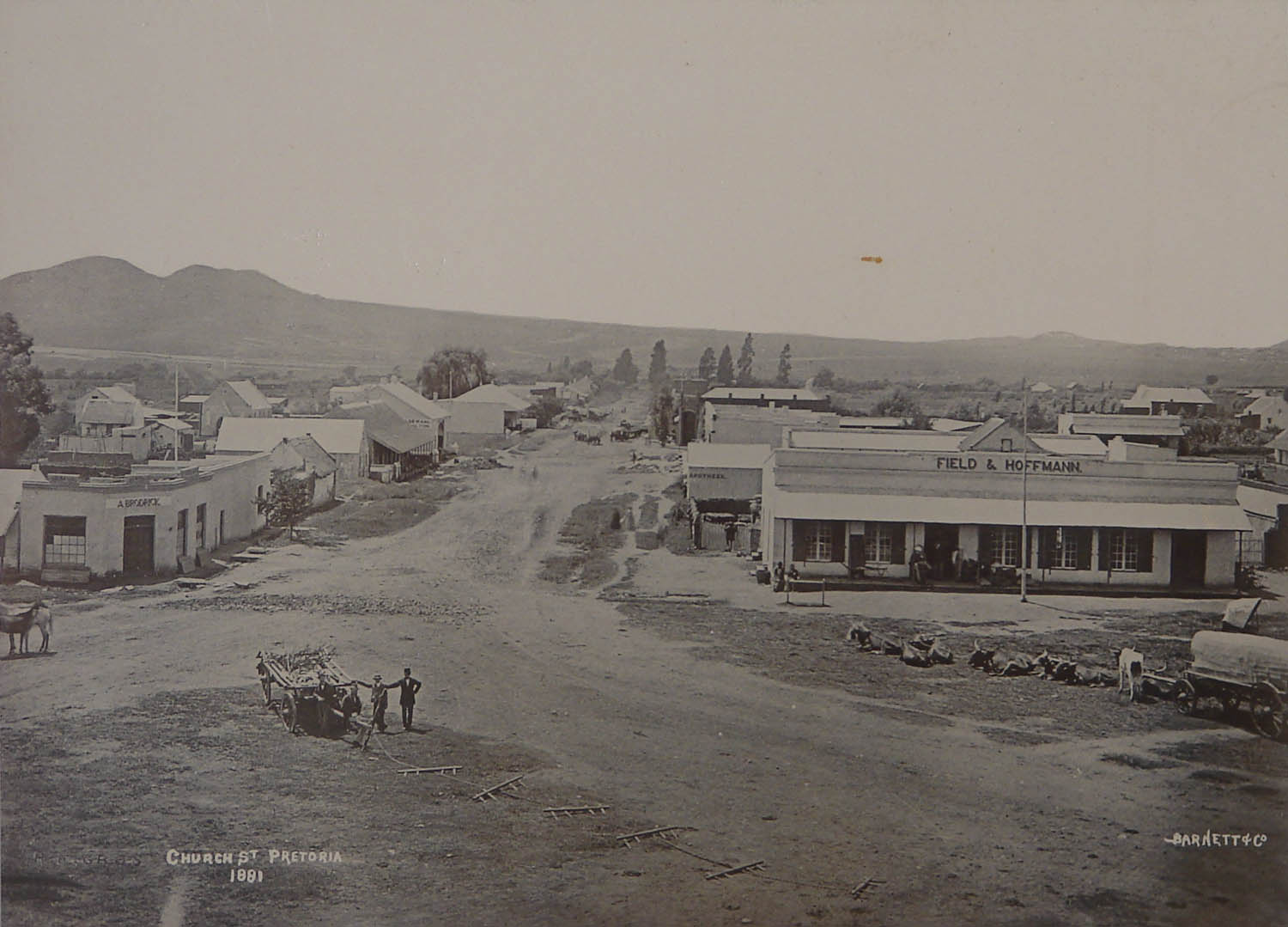
Church Street, Pretoria, 1881

- 1825
  - Mzilikazi arrives in the Transvaal region.
  - Mfecane, or the genocide of the people of the Transvaal by Mzilikazi lasts until 1840.
- 1837
  - Mzilikazi and the Matabele defeated by the Voortrekkers and forced to flee across the Limpopo river
- 1840
  - First permanent white settlers in the Pretoria area.
- 1848
  - David Botha builds a farmhouse that would later become the Pionier Museum.
- 1852
  - 17 January: The Sand River Convention signed granting the Voortrekkers north of the Vaal river (Transvaal) self-government as the South African Republic
- 1853
  - 16 November: The establishment of the Volksraad (parliament) of the South African Republic.
  - M.W. Pretorius buys the farms of Elandspoort and Koedoespoort and later in November of the same year the town of Pretoria is founded on the two adjoining farms.
- 1855
  - Pretoria founded by Voortrekkers to be the capital of the new Transvaal Republic.
- 1867
  - Cullinan diamond field discovered near Pretoria.
- 1873
  - University of South Africa founded.
  - De Volkstem Dutch/English-language newspaper begins publication.
- 1874
  - Burgers Park layout of Pretoria's first botanical gardens.
- 1877
  - British annexation of the Transvaal
- 1879
  - St. Mary's Diocesan School for Girls was established.
- 1880
  - 16 December: Outbreak of the First Boer War
  - December: The city is besieged by Transvaal Republican forces.
- 1881
  - March: The city is once again besieged by Transvaal Republican forces.
  - 3 August: Pretoria Convention peace treaty signed ending the First Boer War. Transvaal independence reinstated with Pretoria as capital.
- 1884
  - Kruger House built.
- 1886
  - Melrose House built.
- 1892
  - Raadsaal (Transvaal parliament) rebuilt.
  - State Museum founded focusing mostly on Natural History.
  - Burgers Park laid out as the city's first botanical gardens.
- 1896

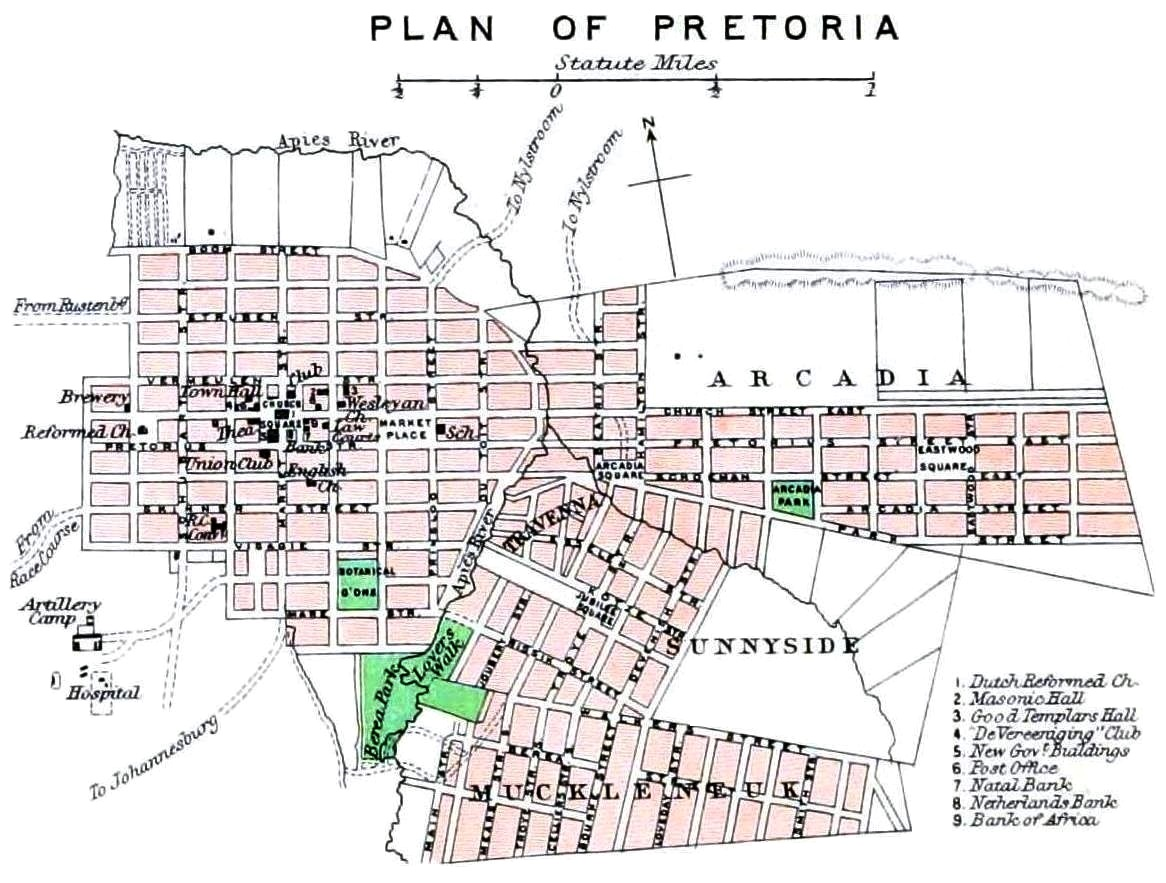
city plan, 1895

  - Staats Model School built.
- 1897
  - 6 April: Fort Schanskop built.
  - 8 June: Palace of Justice built.
  - 4 September: Fort Wonderboompoort built.
- 1898
  - 18 January: Fort Klapperkop built.
  - November: Fort Daspoortrand built.
  - Pretoria News founded.
- 1899
  - Zoo founded.
  - Deutsche Internationale Schule Pretoria founded.
- 1900
  - 5 June: British forces occupy the city.

== 20th century ==
=== 1900s-1940s ===
- 1901 - Pretoria Boys High School founded.
- 1902
  - 31 May: The Treaty of Vereeniging is signed in Melrose House marking the end of the Second Boer War and the establishment of the British Transvaal Colony.
  - Pretoria High School for Girls founded.
  - Premier diamond mine begins operating near Pretoria at Cullinan.
- 1903 - "Local self-government granted."
- 1905
  - Lady Selbourne suburb established.
  - Large Cullinan Diamond discovered near Pretoria.
- 1906 - Imported jacaranda trees planted.
- 1910
  - Pretoria becomes the administrative capital of the British colonial Union of South Africa.
  - Pretoria railway station rebuilt.
- 1913 - Union Buildings constructed in Arcadia.
- 1920
  - Afrikaanse Hoër Meisieskool founded.
  - Afrikaanse Hoër Seunskool founded.
- 1922 - Christian Brothers' College was founded.
- 1923
  - Stadium built in Arcadia.
  - Waterkloof House Preparatory School was founded.
- 1930 - University of Pretoria was founded.
- 1931
  - Capitol Theatre (cinema) opens.
  - 14 October: Pretoria receives official city status.
- 1935 - Pretoria City Hall built.
- 1939 - 1 July: Trolleybuses in Pretoria begin operating.
- 1940 - Atteridgeville suburb established.
- 1942 - Danville suburb established.
- 1946
  - June: Pretoria National Botanical Garden established in the east of the city.
  - Population: 167,649 city; 244,496 urban agglomeration.
- 1948
  - Groenkloof suburb established.
  - Catholic Vicariate of Pretoria established.
  - Clapham High School was founded.
- 1949
  - Hercules becomes part of Pretoria.
  - Voortrekker Monument erected.
  - Die Hoërskool Wonderboom founded.

=== 1950s-1990s ===
- 1951
  - Menlo Park suburb was established
  - Pretoria North High School was founded
  - Population: 231,710 city; 285,379 urban agglomeration.
  - Vlakfontein township established.
- 1952 - Hoërskool Oos-Moot was founded.
- 1955
  - Centenary of Pretoria celebrations under the mayoralty of Hilgard Muller
  - The old German community hall is acquired by the National Theatre Organisation (NTO) and converted into the Breytenbach Theatre.
  - Hillview High School was founded.
- 1956
  - 9 August Women's march.
  - Historical Association of South Africa headquartered in Pretoria.
- 1958 - 17 November The first theatre production opens at the Breytenbach Theatre.
- 1959 - "Treason trial" of ANC leaders begins.
- 1960 - Laudium township and Africa Institute of South Africa established.
- 1961 - City becomes capital of the Republic of South Africa.
- 1962 - Eersterus area established.
- 1963
  - Die Hoërskool Menlopark was founded.
  - St. Alban's College was founded.
  - 9 October: Rivonia Trial begins.
- 1964
  - 12 June: In the Rivonia Trial, Nelson Mandela's original 5-year sentence is extended to life sentence for high treason together with Denis Goldberg, Ahmed Kathrada, Govan Mbeki, Raymond Mhlaba, Andrew Mlangeni, Elias Motsoaledi and Walter Sisulu at the Palace of Justice.
  - 6 November: Vuyisile Mini is being hanged due to death penalty for treason together with Wilson Khayinga and Zinakile Mkaba.
  - November: In the Little Rivonia Trial, sentence was introduced for another treason: Wilton Mkwayi received life sentence; Dave Kitson twenty years; Laloo Chiba eighteen years; John Matthews fifteen years and Mac Maharaj twelve years.
- 1966 - Fort Klapperkop is restored and turned into the Fort Klapperkop Military Museum.
- 1970
  - Population: 543,950 city; 561,703 urban agglomeration.
  - Mamelodi Sundowns was established.
- 1972
  - Daspoort Tunnel opens.
  - 21 February: Trolleybuses in Pretoria cease operating.
- 1974 - Hoërskool Overkruin was founded.
- 1975 - Pionier Museum opens in the oldest extant structure in Pretoria, a farmhouse circa 1848.
- 1976
  - The Glen High School was founded.
  - Soshanguve suburb was founded
- 1977 - 12 September: Death of Steve Biko.
- 1979
  - Hoërskool Waterkloof was founded.
  - 6 April Solomon Mahlangu, Umkhonto we Sizwe operative hanged due to death penalty.
  - Menlyn Park shopping mall in business.
- 1981
  - State Theatre opens.
  - Hoërskool Montana was founded.
- 1983
  - 20 May: Church Street bombing was perpetrated by Umkhonto we Sizwe, the military wing of the African National Congress. The bombing killed 19, including two perpetrators, and wounded 217,
  - Hoërskool Die Wilgers was founded.
- 1984 - Atteridgeville-Saulsville Residents Organisation formed.
- 1985
  - 28 February Denis Goldberg was released from custody of Apartheid government after spending 22 years in Pretoria Central Prison white prison.
  - Large Golden Jubilee Diamond discovered near Pretoria
  - 21 November The Mamelodi Massacre occurs after 8000 protesters march on the Mamelodi Town Council due to high rent. Thirteen people lost their lives.
  - Population: 443,059 city; 822,925 urban agglomeration.
  - SuperSport United was established.
- 1986 - Idasa institute founded.
- 1987 - Willowridge High School was founded.
- 1988 - Hoërskool Garsfontein was founded.
- 1991
  - Institute for Security Studies established.
  - Population: 525,583 city; 1,080,187 metro.
- 1993 - Radio Pretoria and Tuks FM radio begin broadcasting.
- 1994
  - City becomes part of the newly established Pretoria-Witwatersrand-Vaal province (later Gauteng).
  - Inauguration of South African president Nelson Mandela.
  - Pro Arte Alphen Park was founded.
- 1996
  - Population: 692,348 city.
  - Area of city: 229 square miles.
  - South African Local Government Association headquartered in Pretoria.
- 2000
  - 5 December: Pretoria becomes the seat of the newly established City of Tshwane Metropolitan Municipality.
  - Impak newspaper begins publication.
  - June: University of Pretoria's Mapungubwe Museum opens.
  - Crawford College was founded.

== 21st century ==
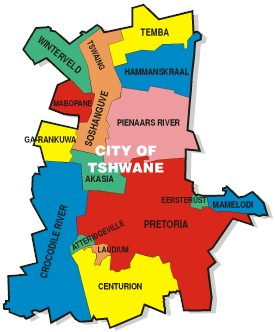
Map of Tshwane, showing location of Pretoria, 2006

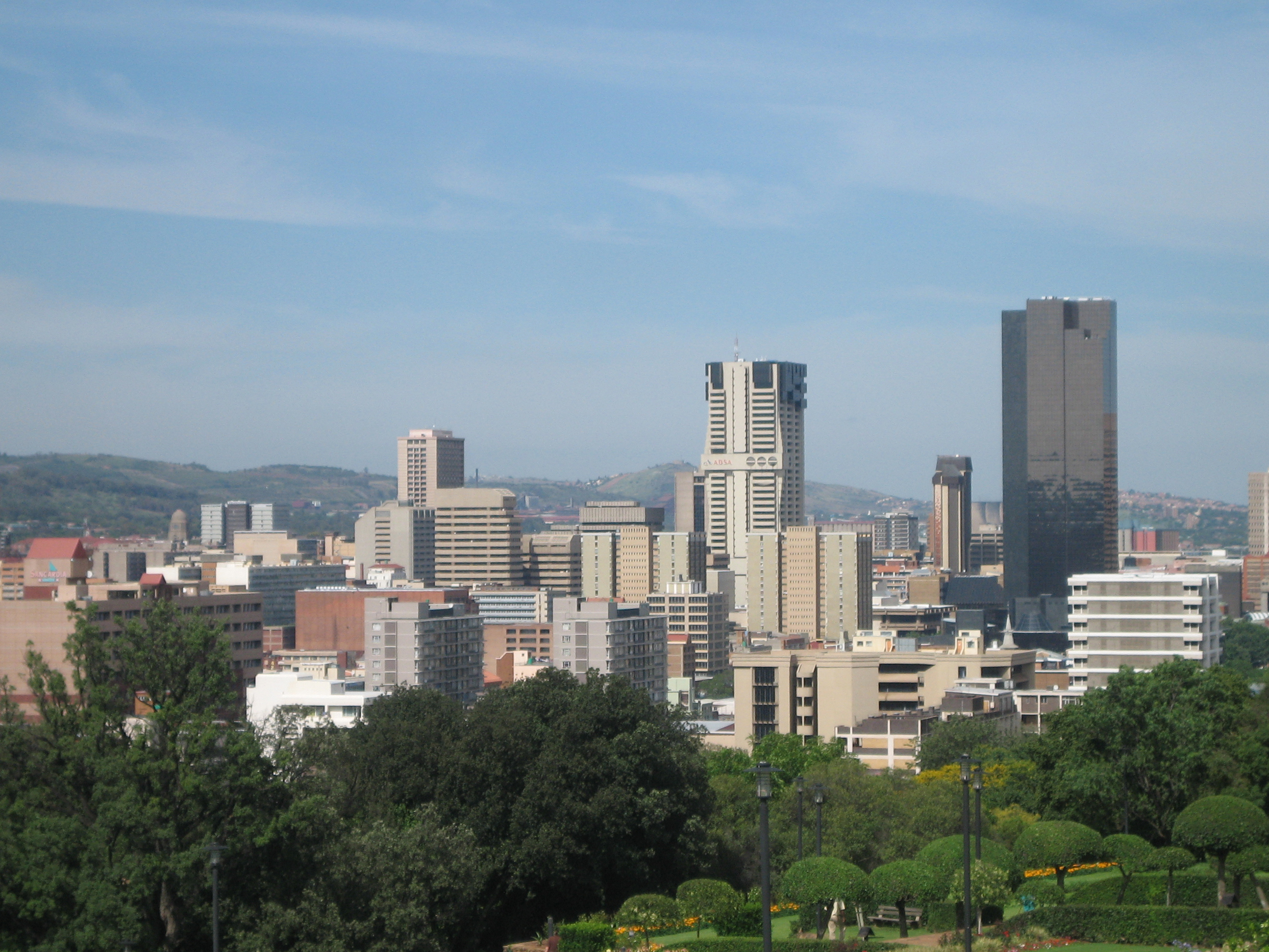
View of Pretoria, 2008

- 2001
  - Website Tshwane.gov.za launched.
- 2002
  - 30 July: Pretoria Accord signed in Pretoria. It was an agreement made between Rwanda and the Democratic Republic of the Congo (DRC) in an attempt to bring about an end to the Second Congo War.
- 2004
  - Tshwane University of Technology established by merging several former institutions.
  - 8 March:Freedom Park is inaugurated by Thabo Mbeki.
  - Woodlands Boulevard shopping centre in business.
- 2005
  - December: Shanty town unrest.
- 2008
  - August: Congress of South African Trade Unions demonstration.
  - Ditsong Museums of South Africa is created in order to manage several Museums in Pretoria and Johannesburg.
- 2011
  - Gautrain begins operating with stations at Hatfield, Pretoria Central and Centurion.
  - August: Economic protest.
  - Kgosientso Ramokgopa becomes mayor of Tshwane.
  - Population: 2,921,488 in Tshwane.
- 2012
  - 11 July: Construction begins on the A Re Yeng rapid bus transit system.
- 2013
  - 31 January: Train collision injuring 300 people near the Kalafong station.
- 2014
  - Air pollution in Tshwane reaches annual mean of 51 PM2.5 and 63 PM10, more than recommended.
  - 1 December: A Re Yeng rapid bus transit system launches.
- 2016
  - 20–23 June:Riots broke out in Tshwane over the ANC's selection of Thoko Didiza as mayoral candidate for Tshwane. The Tshwane riots result in the deaths of at least five people after it turned xenophobic in nature.
  - 19 August: Solly Msimanga of the Democratic Alliance is sworn in as the Executive Mayor after the 2016 Municipal Elections.
- 2017
  - 24 February: An Anti-Immigration Protest resulting in the arrest of 136 protesters.
  - 1 April: The grand opening of Time Square, Pretoria the second biggest casino complex in South Africa.
  - 1 November: SunBet Arena at Times square was opened.
- 2019
  - 11 February: Solly Msimanga resigns as mayor
  - 12 February 2019: Stevens Mokgalapa is elected mayor.
  - 23 August 2019: Hoërskool Hendrik Verwoerd becomes as the newly Rietondale High School.

== See also ==
- Pretoria history (af)
- List of Pretoria suburbs
- Timelines of other cities in South Africa: Cape Town, Durban, Gqeberha, Johannesburg, Pietermaritzburg

== Bibliography ==
Published in 20th century

- H.T. Montague Bell; C. Arthur Lane (1905). "Pretoria". Guide to the Transvaal. Johannesburg Reception Committee.
- A. Samler Brown; G. Gordon Brown, eds. (1906), "Pretoria", Guide to South Africa (14th ed.), London: Sampson Low, Marston & Company
- Patrick Heenan (1996). "Pretoria". In Noelle Watson (ed.). International Dictionary of Historic Places: Middle East and Africa. UK: Routledge. pp. 592+. ISBN 1884964036.
- John Paxton, ed. (1999). "Pretoria, South Africa". Penguin Encyclopedia of Places (3rd ed.). Penguin. ISBN 9780140512755.

Published in 21st century

- Sello Mathabatha (2004). "The PAC and the POQO in Pretoria, 1958-1964". In South African Democracy Education Trust (ed.). Road to Democracy in South Africa: 1960-1970. Zebra. p. 299+. ISBN 978-1-86872-906-7.
- Kevin Shillington, ed. (2005), "Pretoria", Encyclopedia of African History, London: Routledge, p. 1229+, ISBN 9781135456702
- Vivien Allen; Hannes Meiring (2007). Kruger's Pretoria: Buildings and Personalities of the City in the Nineteenth Century. Protea Book House. ISBN 978-1-86919-102-3.
