= Vernon Berrangé =

South African activist and lawyer (1900–1983)

Vernon Celliers Berrangé
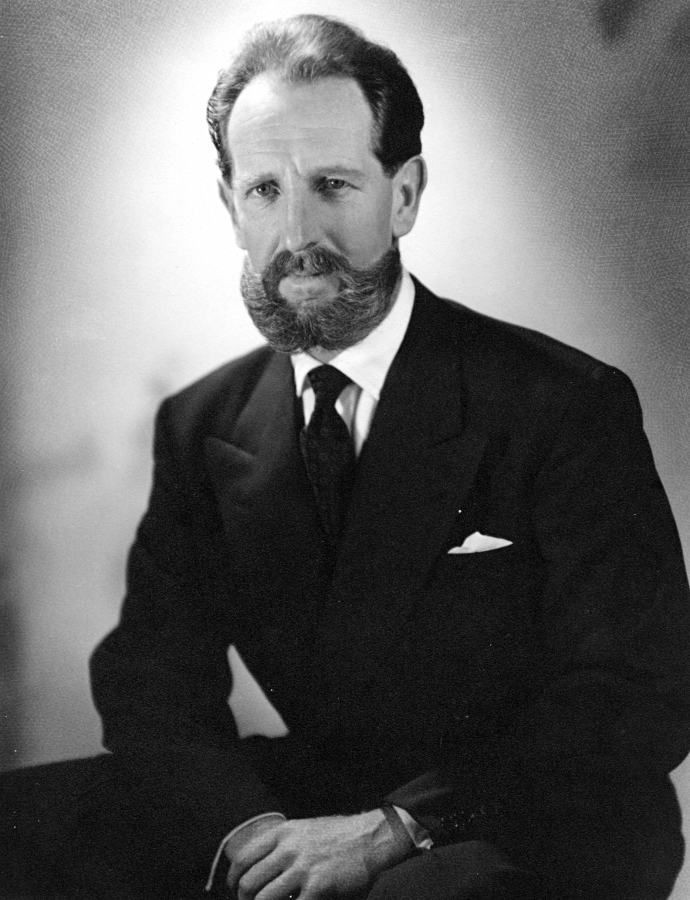
- Born: 25 November 1900; Pretoria
- Died: 14 September 1983 (aged 82); Swaziland
- Education: University of Cape Town, 1924
- Occupation: Advocate
- Years active: 1924–1966
- Political party: Communist
- Awards: Grand Companion of OR Tambo

Vernon Celliers Berrangé (25 November 1900 – 14 September 1983) was an eminent South African human rights advocate, and criminal defense and human rights lawyer (QC). The South African government posthumously bestowed the Order of the Companion of O.R. Tambo, April 27, 2010, for his contributions to ending apartheid.

== Forebears ==
Berrangé's forebears were in the third wave of French Huguenots who went to the Cape (via Holland) in 1775 and as history evolved became Afrikaners (Boers). The Berrangés were essentially a family of Dutch Reformed ministers, but there were also "sick-comforters," medical doctors, public servants, politicians and advocates. His mother was Elizabeth Theresa Krogh. Berrangé's maternal grandfather, Johannes C. Krogh of Danish extraction, was Special Commissioner sent from the South African Republic to Swaziland (1894 to 1898), head of the Boundary Commission that settled the border between Swaziland and Moçambique (Maputo) in 1897 and one of the Boer signatories to the "Treaty of the Peace of Vereeniging".

== Family ==
Berrangé married (7 March 1930) Yolande Viviane Brewer, née de Pierres (born 1900), who loved and supported him in all ways for 50 years until her death (1980). They had one son, Jevan Pierres Berrangé (b. 1931, d. 2018); a daughter Gelda Frances Berrangé (b.8 February 1927, d. 2015), and a son Eric Brewer (b. 15 June 1921, d. 30 March 2010) from their respective earlier marriages.

== Education ==
Berrangé was born in Pretoria soon after it had been occupied by the British during the Anglo-Boer War. He received his primary education at the Falk Real Gymnasium in Berlin (1907–1910) and at the German School in Johannesburg (1911). His secondary school was Hilton College, Natal, where he is commemorated on a plaque as "Scholar of the Year'". On leaving school (1917) he enlisted as one of Major Miller's recruits and became a Lieutenant in the Royal Air Force, being trained in Kent, UK. After demobilisation (1919) he returned to South Africa and worked briefly for the Institute for Medical Research before going to the University of Cape Town from which he graduated (1924) with a law degree – BA LLB.

== Recreation and other interests ==
Berrangé was an immaculate dresser and had a penchant for high living and fast cars. He was always against authority, loved a challenge and revelled in danger. He was a very active man, both intellectually and physically. Sports at school, in the RAF and at university included boxing, rowing, rugby and swimming. Later he became a motor racing driver (1932) on South African circuits. He had a large collection of sporting firearms and was keen on big game hunting and bird shooting. His considerable knowledge of guns and ballistics was something that he found useful in some of his criminal cases. In the 1930s he had an interest in a small gold mine in Swaziland. He read avidly and travelled widely in Africa and Europe.

== Communist ==
Berrangé joined the South African Communist Party of his own volition in about 1938, holding the opinion that it was an organisation which expressed in practice those economic and social theories which appealed to him. Berrangé was an ordinary member attached to the Central Branch in Johannesburg, except for a period when he was on a committee dealing with Industrial Legislation and Trade Union Work. Berrangé resigned from the SACP in 1950 when and because it was dissolved, after the passing of the Suppression of Communism Act 1950. Berrangé later reappraised and radically changed his views, to become critical of the theories and practices of the party. Despite this change of views he remained friends with some former comrades and subsequently was a member of the team defending Bram Fischer in court.

== Legal career ==
Berrangé was admitted to the South African Bar in 1924 but in 1926 he left the Bar and went into partnership with his father, James Louis Steyn Berrangé (born 16 October 1865, died 1931), as an attorney. He remained at the Side Bar until 1950 when he was re-admitted to the Bar where he remained until his retirement in 1966.

Berrangé built up a reputation as an outstanding criminal defence and human rights lawyer with a reputation for devastating cross-examination.

'He cross-examined witnesses with a steely cold manner, which, coupled with devastating insight into their psychology, seemed to strike terror into the most belligerent of policemen. He was the most sought-after criminal lawyer of the time, and had also appeared in almost every major political trial in the country, including the Treason Trial.'

He was a co-founder of The Organisation for Rights and Justice and Chairman of the Legal Aid Society. As such he was often willing to accept briefs in cases where non-whites were charged under the discriminatory apartheid laws, and in such cases usually acted pro bono.

=== Special wartime duties ===
In 1941 Berrangé was charged with special duties by Brigadier General Collyer, Military Secretary to General Smuts. These duties included seeking out fascists who might be infiltrating the armed forces. After the Second World War, however, Berrangé would find himself increasingly involved in defending the human rights of those prosecuted by the Nationalist Government some of whose members had been supporters of the Nazis.

=== Alexandra bus boycott ===
Following the Alexandra Township bus boycott (1944), organised in response to the bus companies raising bus fares by a penny, the Government passed emergency legislation that prohibited all meetings. Communists Bram Fischer and Berrangé discovered a legal loophole in this legislation which meant that the boycotters could still assemble and march. However, when discussing this loophole over the phone, their lines were tapped by the police who thereby learned of it and hastily redrafted the legislation. The boycotters won their concessions in the end. This was the first of many times that Berrangé and Fischer worked together for justice for the oppressed.

=== African mine workers' strike ===
In 1946, whilst he was on holiday in Europe, Berrangé received a phone call from Bram Fischer asking him to return to South Africa to defend him and others on a charge of inciting the African Mine Workers' Strike. This was strongly supported by the SACP. Some 70,000 African miners took part in this momentous strike which lasted five days before it was violently put down by the police at the cost of eleven miners killed and more than 1,200 injured. The 52 defendants pleaded guilty to aiding and abetting a strike, but they received relatively modest sentences.

=== The F.M. Alexander case ===
Together with others including Harold Hanson and Bram Fischer, Berrangé acted for F. M. Alexander in the high-profile Alexander Libel Trial which caused an international stir. Berrangé was initially introduced to the Alexander Technique by his wife, Yolande. In the 1940s all close family members were having "Alexander lessons" from Irene Tasker who had been taught by Alexander in New York and London, and his son Jevan was attending Tasker's Montessori school. When Dr Ernst Jokl, Director of Physical Education to the South African Government and apparently hostile to the Alexander Technique, asked Tasker to demonstrate the Technique, she arranged for Berrangé to be present as a legal witness. Upon reading Jokl's subsequent article in the SA Government journal 'Volkskragte', Berrangé was of the opinion that it was libellous and suggested that Tasker show it to Alexander, whom subsequently started libel proceedings. As instructing attorney for Alexander, Berrangé journeyed to London in 1946 to help prepare the case with his client and English Counsel. He became friendly with Alexander, who joined Berrangé and his wife Yolande and the Barlows (Bill and Marjory, Alexander Technique teachers) on a short holiday to France. The trial proper was heard in South Africa in 1948. Alexander won his case and was awarded damages.

=== The Treason Trial ===
The circumstances which led to the South African Treason Trial, the proceedings, and the conclusion some ten years later, all demonstrated Berrangé's personal qualities and professional skill.

In 1951 when the leaders of the Congress Movement developed a plan involving deliberate defiance of the apartheid laws, Berrangé was consulted on its legal implications. After the Defiance Campaign during which some 8,000 volunteers went to prison; in 1955 the Congress of the People organised a convention, attended by thousands of delegates, to present the Freedom Charter that was essentially a call for a democratic South Africa in which "all shall enjoy equal human rights". The Nationalist Government's reaction to this was to arrest 156 people and charge them with high treason, a crime punishable by the death penalty. The accused represented a cross-section of South Africans from all walks of life and included Oliver Tambo, Chief Albert Luthuli (winner of the Nobel Peace Prize), Helen Joseph and Nelson Mandela. The formidable defence team included Berrangé who, in a stirring opening address at the preliminary hearing, contended, inter alia, that the ideas and beliefs expressed in the Freedom Charter, although opposed to the policy of the Government, were shared by the overwhelming majority of humankind, of all races and all colours, and also the overwhelming majority of the country's citizens. He argued that the treason allegations amounted to a political plot comparable with the Inquisition and the Reichstag Fire Trial, and were an attempt to silence and outlaw the ideas held by the accused and the thousands whom they represented. This vibrant address was published in newspapers around the world.

The State alleged that holding the Congress of the People and adopting the Freedom Charter constituted steps towards the establishment of a communist state and the prelude to revolution. They aimed to show that speeches and writings by the accused were communistic. Probably the most farcical event in the trial occurred when expert witness for the prosecution, Prof. A.H. Murray of the University of Cape Town, gave evidence on the nature of communism and the infallible clues that he claimed indicated certain statements and speeches were communistic or communist inspired. Berrangé's cross-examination was dramatic. He read out a number of statements by various people and the professor agreed that these were "the sort of statements that communists make". Berrangé then revealed that the statements had been made by persons such as former SA Prime Minister Malan, President Franklin Roosevelt, William Pitt, Heine, Luther, Voltaire, Milton and Jefferson and finally one written by Prof Murray himself in the 1930s!

'Vernon had been our god during the long months of the Preparatory Examination in the Drill Hall. He fought our battles for us, ever ready to take up the cudgels on our behalf. Medium in height and build, always impeccably dressed, he was a joy to behold as he would systematically demolish the Crown witnesses. Long before the trial began the name Vernon Berrangé struck fear into the hearts of police witnesses, because of his incomparable and merciless skill in exposing unreliable or dishonest evidence. Only the utmost truth and sincerity could ever stand against this supreme master of cross-examination.

The accused had been arrested in December 1956, but it was only in March 1961, after numerous hearings, that by unanimous verdict the Court found all the accused not guilty and Berrangé was carried aloft outside the court.

=== Move to Swaziland and retirement ===
In 1959 Berrangé left Johannesburg to live in Swaziland, where he acquired Citizenship of the United Kingdom and Colonies thereby forfeiting his South African citizenship and passport. He continued to practise law intermittently, both in the Republic of South Africa and Swaziland, until his full retirement in 1966 and resignation from the Johannesburg Bar. The proceedings of the Truth and Reconciliation Commission show that South African Government continued to keep Berrange under close surveillance whenever he visited the country. He was briefly on a committee whose purpose was to afford assistance to political refugees from South Africa. In 1963, at the time of the Rivonia arrests, two suspects, Harold Wolpe and Arthur Goldreich, made a spectacular jail break from the Johannesburg Fort and eventually managed to get to Swaziland where Berrangé helped by arranging a charter plane to fly them to Bechuanaland (Botswana) Berrangé died in Swaziland in 1983 at Siteki, Lubombo.

=== The Rivonia Trial ===
The Rivonia Trial was the outcome of a raid on Liliesleaf Farm at Rivonia near Johannesburg on 11 July 1963, when police arrested seven alleged members of the armed wing of the African National Congress, seizing many highly incriminating documents of their activities and plans. The accused included Walter Sisulu, Ahmed Kathrada, Raymond Mhlaba, Rusty Bernstein and Nelson Mandela, who had been arrested later upon release from jail. The charge was sabotage and the death sentence seemed likely. The defence team was led by Bram Fischer and included Berrangé, whom he asked to come from Swaziland. He accepted unhesitatingly despite risking ex-communication from the legal profession as he knew that the government was drafting legislation which would permit them to debar any "named" communist from practising law in South Africa. Berrangé had special responsibility for the defence of Bernstein, Mhlaba and Kathrada. Once again, his devastating cross-examination exposed inconsistencies and outright lies in the testimony of many of the state witnesses. With the exception of Bernstein, all the accused were found guilty and sentenced to lengthy jail terms (from 22 to 27 years) but avoided the death penalty.

=== Looksmart Ngudle inquest ===
As part of a crack-down following the Rivonia raid, in mid-August 1963 the police arrested Looksmart Khulile Ngudle, a regional leader of Umkhonto we Sizwe. Sixteen days later he was found hanged in his cell. Despite the police's best attempts at suppression of the cause of his death they were eventually forced to hold an inquest. Berrangé represented Ngudle's widow and decided to turn the inquest into a forum on police torture. When the Court deemed evidence of torture to other detainees as inadmissible Berrangé withdrew from the proceedings in protest. The matter was subsequently raised in Parliament by Helen Suzman to the great embarrassment of the Government.

=== Trial of Rusty Bernstein ===
Shortly after his acquittal in the Rivonia Trial, Rusty Bernstein was arrested again on three charges under the Suppression of Communism Act. Berrangé again

'appeared on his behalf and pulled off one of those spectacular pieces of legerdemain which Vernon managed so brilliantly from time to time. He persuaded the prosecutor and magistrate and do what everyone believed was quite impossible – to grant Bernstein bail'.

Rusty and his wife Hilda were thus able to flee to the UK via Botswana.

=== The Fischer Trial ===
Berrangé's last political trial was defending his friend and colleague Bram Fischer, who along with 14 others had been charged in 1964 under the Suppression of Communism Act. In the event Fischer realised the futility of his case and whilst the trial was in progress skipped bail and went underground to continue the struggle against apartheid. He was recaptured nine months later in November 1965, put on trial for a second time, found guilty and sentenced to life imprisonment.

== Award ==
In 2010 Berrangé was posthumously awarded The Order of the Companions of O.R. Tambo in silver "for his excellent contribution to the struggle against racial oppression in South Africa".
