= Johannes Christoffel Krogh =

South African politician (1846–1921)

Magistrate of Pretoria
- In office June 1, 1878 – December 31, 1878

Landdrost of Middelburg

First High Commissioner of Swaziland
- In office 1893–?

Special Commissioner of Swaziland
- In office Feb 21, 1895 – 1902

Senator in Cape Town Parliament
- In office c. 1910 – ?

Personal details
- Born: Sept 6, 1846; Grahamstown, Cape Town
- Died: May 5th, 1921; Middelburg, South Africa
- Spouse: Maria Jacobs Carolina Meintjies

Johannes C. Krogh (September 6, 1846, Grahamstown, Cape Town – May 5, 1921), of Danish extraction, was a civil servant and politician of the former South African Republic (later known as the province of Transvaal of the Republic of South Africa).

== Family ==
Krogh married Maria Jacoba Carolina Meintjies (daughter of Stephanus Jacobus Meintjies of Pretoria) on May 31, 1873. Krogh was the grandfather of Vernon Berrangé, the well known early anti-apartheid activist.

== Career ==
Krogh held the position of Magistrate of Pretoria from 1 June 1878 to 31 December 1878, with duties similar to that of a Landdrost. Krogh later become Landdrost of Middelburg.

Krogh was appointed First High Commissioner of Swaziland under the Boer Republic, in 1893, by President Paul Kruger. From Feb 21st, 1895 Krogh held the position of Special Commissioner in the Swaziland Government. He was head of the Boundary Commission that settled the border between Swaziland and Mozambique (Maputo) in 1897 and the beacon north of the Mbuluzi River is called "Krogh's Beacon". When the Anglo-Boer War broke out in 1899, Krogh returned to South Africa. He was also one of the Boer signatories to the "Treaty of the Peace of Vereeniging", signed on 31 May 1902 at 11:05 in Melrose House, Pretoria, that formally ended the Anglo-Boer War.

In 1910 Krogh became a Senator in the Cape Town Parliament.
