= F. Matthias Alexander =

Australian actor and author

- Born: Frederick Matthias Alexander; 20 January 1869; Wynyard, Tasmania
- Died: 10 October 1955 (aged 86); London, England
- Occupations: Actor, teacher
- Known for: Alexander technique

Frederick Matthias Alexander (20 January 1869 – 10 October 1955) was an Australian actor and author who developed the Alexander technique, an educational process said to recognize and overcome reactive, habitual limitations in movement and thinking.

== Early life ==
Alexander was born on 20 January 1869, in Australia on the northern bank of the Inglis River, near the present-day town of Wynyard, Tasmania. He was the eldest of ten children born to John Alexander, a blacksmith, and Betsy Brown. His parents were the offspring of convicts transported to what was then called Van Diemen's Land for offences such as theft and destroying agricultural machinery as part of the 1830 Swing Riots in England. Throughout his life Alexander was evasive about his ancestry, claiming Scottish descent and upgrading the status of his forebears.

The Alexander family had, in fact, for generations prior to the Swing Riots, lived at Ramsbury in Wiltshire. In Tudor and Stuart times they were agricultural labourers, but by the eighteenth century had established themselves as carpenters and wheelwrights, some moderately wealthy, owning cottages and fields. Alexander was born prematurely, and his survival was due to his mother's determination and care. As a result, he was her favourite child, and they remained close throughout his life. His relationship with his religious, hard-working father was less strong, and Alexander, with other family members, later became estranged from him. However, he later credited his father with teaching him to be alert and observant.

The family moved to Wynyard town in 1870, and Alexander, though not strong physically, enjoyed rural activities such as fishing and shooting, and learned a love of horses, riding and horse racing. He grew up in an evangelical Protestant household; the Sabbath was strictly observed, and his father, apparently a heavy drinker, seems to have taken a pledge of temperance in 1879. Alexander described himself as an agnostic, but was profoundly influenced by his Christian upbringing: his speech as an adult was peppered with biblical quotes, and he had been imbued a strong sense of right and wrong, self-discipline and personal responsibility. Education was not a priority for many local parents, but Betsy Alexander was determined that her children should be educated. Alexander first attended a Sunday school, and later the government school. Alexander was precocious, sensitive and attention-seeking, and as such made a difficult pupil.

However, his teacher, a Scotsman named Robert Robertson, proved sympathetic, and acted as something of a father figure; he excused Alexander from daily school attendance and instead gave him lessons in the evening. As well as a basic education, Robertson gave Alexander a lifelong love of Shakespeare, theatre and poetry. Alexander was physically not suited to manual labour: he would later state that an otherwise idyllic boyhood had been marred by the severe internal pains that he experienced, generally after physical exertion. At 15, Alexander became a pupil-teacher assistant to Robertson, with the goal of a career as a schoolmaster.

At age sixteen, he visited an aunt and uncle in Waratah, a town serving the tin-mine at Mount Bischoff. While there, he was offered a well-paying job by the mining company. On the advice of his parents, he accepted the job, despite the disappointment it caused Robertson. According to Alexander's later account, his work at the mining company was appreciated by his employers; he took on additional jobs as a life insurance agent and a collector of rates, and was able to save £500, a considerable sum at the time. In his spare time, he pursued interests in horse racing and began learning the violin. He also participated in a local amateur dramatics society, playing several roles and meeting members of touring professional companies. These included the pianist with one company, Robert Young and his aspiring actress wife, Edith, who was later to marry Alexander himself.

== Melbourne, 1889–1904 ==
In 1889, after three years in Waratah, Alexander decided to leave Tasmania to follow his aunt and uncle to Melbourne where they had moved the year before. He sought as he later put it "a wider scope of activity, not only in gaining a livelihood but in the fields of art and education in the fullest sense." He spent his first three months in the city devoting himself to culture, and spending his savings on visiting theatres and art galleries and attending concerts. According to his own account, he determined to "train myself for a career as a reciter to take a position meanwhile in the office of some company." He worked in a series of clerical jobs and took lessons from teachers such as an English actor James Cathcart, and an Australian elocutionist Fred Hill. He was inspired by the Melbourne theatrical performances of Sarah Bernhardt, all of which he claimed to have attended.

Alexander continued to suffer periods of ill-health, and was advised by his doctor to leave Melbourne for healthier climes. Three months of seaside air of Geelong helped him recover his health, and he returned to the city. Little information exists about much of Alexander's years in Melbourne, but from November 1891 onwards, newspapers began to report his participation in amateur dramatic recitals, and give them positive reviews. However, Alexander began to suffer from hoarseness, and at times after performing could hardly speak. Friends also noted audible "gasping" during his recitations. As described forty years later in the first chapter of his book The Use of the Self, advice from doctors and voice trainers did not have the necessary results, so he began a process of self-examination with mirrors into his speaking habits to see if he could determine the cause. With time, he found that by using "conscious control" of actions, by inhibiting wrong movements rather than trying to "do" correct ones, and by focussing on the "means whereby" rather than "the end to be gained", his vocal problems and longstanding respiratory problems disappeared. The evidence from other publications of Alexander's, however, suggests that these insights came to Alexander over a much longer period and in a less systematic fashion than he described in 1932, with some terms and procedures not appearing in his writings until as late as 1924.

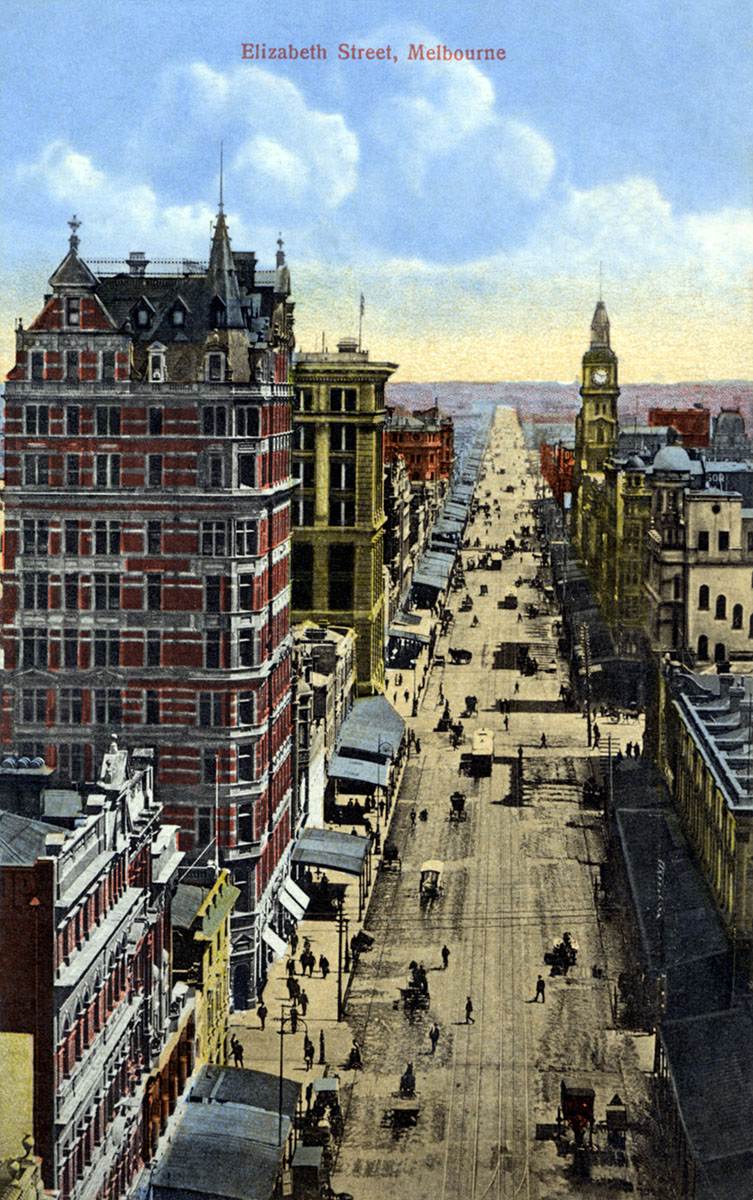
The Australian Building, Melbourne, to the left, where FM Alexander taught his technique.

Freed from his vocal problems, Alexander gave up his clerical jobs and embarked on a career as a professional reciter and voice teacher. He commenced in early 1894 with a tour of his native Tasmania, which included an unhappy visit to his family. His parents' financial situation was precarious, and they had been deeply affected by the death of an infant son in 1893; his father turned to alcohol as a result. According to Alexander, father and son quarrelled, with John Alexander expressing disapproval of his son as a "vagabond and strolling player", and there is no record of them ever meeting again. Otherwise, the tour was a success, with excellent press reviews and a performance before the Governor of Tasmania in Hobart, a concert in which Robert and Edith Young, whom he had met years earlier at Watarah, also appeared. The trio developed a close friendship. Besides giving recitals, he also gave "elocution lessons".

In early 1895, he set out for New Zealand where he visited various cities, giving recitals to excellent reviews and voice lessons to several prominent individuals, including Frederic Villiers and the Mayor of Auckland. Despite being advised to go to America to seek his fortune, he returned to Melbourne, with the intention of teaching his new method there. In 1896, Alexander rented teaching rooms in a landmark building on Elizabeth St, known as the Australian Building. He advertised his voice lessons in the press and with pamphlets, claiming both to develop the voice and to "cure" stuttering and throat ailments. In his pamphlets his pupils, in the early days mainly clergymen, enthusiastically testified to improvements in their voice and general health, and doctors reported that patients sent to him had improved. Within the year, Alexander invited a younger brother Albert Redden Alexander (known as A.R.) to join him as his assistant; he was followed by a sister, Amy, who came initially to receive help for medical problems, but was then also trained in the work. Back in Tasmania, Alexander's father was drinking heavily, and the family's economic situation was bleak; towards the end of the year, Alexander's mother and three of his siblings arrived in Melbourne, never to return. Alexander devoted himself mainly to his teaching and practice, with an occasional recital. In 1899, Alexander moved in with his old friends Robert and Edith Young and formed something of a menage à trois, with Edith and Alexander's affair accepted by Robert.

The trio organized theatrical entertainments in Melbourne and then in Sydney where Alexander, and later the Youngs, moved in 1900. Due in part to Edith Young's ambitions as a professional actor, from 1901 to 1903 Alexander and the Youngs produced a series of Shakespearean plays, starring Alexander and Edith, and with Alexander's students in the lesser roles. Alexander spent most of his time on the money-losing plays and Shakespeare classes and little time teaching his method.

However, in 1902, his approach impressed a leading Sydney surgeon, W. J. Stewart McKay, who helped him with referrals and became a close friend. Perhaps as a result, Alexander's method (and advertising) focussed more on medical issues, including tuberculosis. McKay also encouraged Alexander to develop his medical knowledge by attending classes at the medical school, but he proved a poor student. McKay recommended Alexander go to London, and offered to give him introductions to leading doctors there. Alexander was in debt, but his financial problems were alleviated when he won a £750 horse racing bet. This allowed him to pay off some of his creditors, provide some support for his female relatives and buy a passage to England. He sailed from Melbourne in April 1904, and was not to return.

== London, 1904–1914 ==
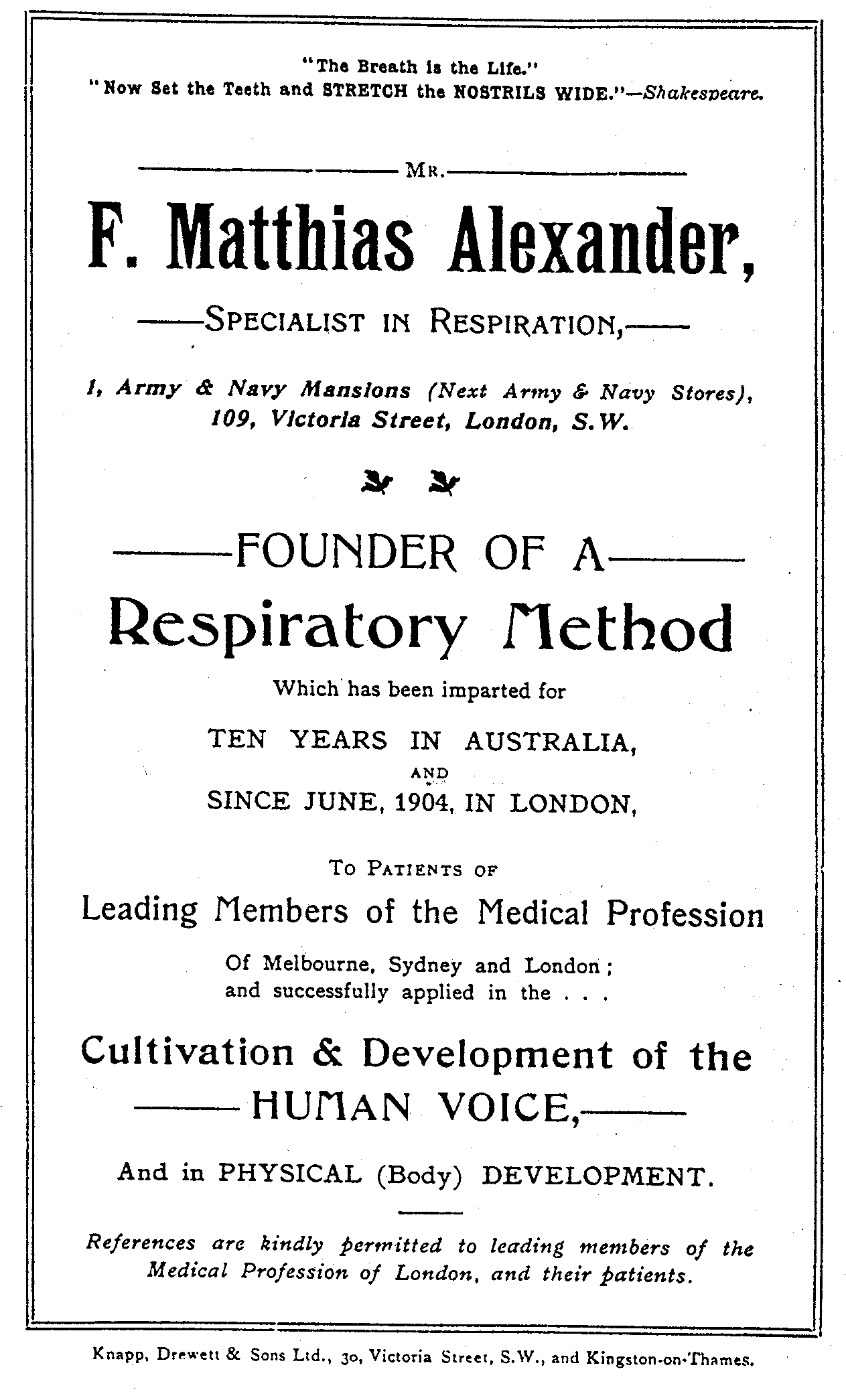
Early advertising material for Alexander's services in London

Alexander arrived London in June 1904, and quickly acquired a fine wardrobe, a manservant, and a smart address at the Army & Navy Mansions in Victoria Street. As he later said "In those days, you just couldn't get on here [London] unless you appeared to be the right sort." Armed with letters of recommendation from Dr. McKay and other Australian doctors, he quickly gained important supporters in the London medical community. A key contact and mentor was the ENT surgeon R.H. Scanes Spicer, who took lessons and promoted Alexander's method and referred him pupils. Given Alexander's love of the theatre, he was particularly delighted when Spicer asked him to see the actress Lily Brayton, who had lost her voice. Alexander's successful treatment led to introductions to other stage actors including Brayton's husband Oscar Asche, Henry Irving, Herbert Beerbohm Tree and George Alexander. The first three were supportive, but having taken a lesson George Alexander accused his teacher of "practising extortion" when given the bill. Nevertheless, after two years, Alexander's practice was booming, and with a rate of 4 guineas an hour, Alexander was doing well financially. He likely remitted some of his earnings to Australia to help support his mother and sisters, and to repay his debts, but he was also able to live well. He developed a taste for the finer things in life, including food, wine and cigars, and was a regular patron of London's best restaurants. He rode his horse daily, fox-hunted periodically, and pursued his lifelong interest in horse racing.

Alexander produced a series of pamphlets in order to explain his discoveries about respiration and the voice and describe his successful cases. Alexander was not a good or clear writer, but these works show the development of Alexander's theories and the first mentions in print of such important concepts in the Alexander Technique as "conscious control", "antagonistic action", the whispered "ah", the unreliability of self-perceptions and sensations, "inhibition" and the "means whereby". Edith Young travelled to England soon after, arriving in September 1904.

Letters from her ailing husband Robert suggest that he encouraged her to follow Alexander, and urged Alexander to take care of and be faithful to her. Alexander had hoped that Edith would help him with his teaching, but she was interested in a stage career, and was scornful of his work. Motivated by concerns about respectability and perhaps about what she might reveal about his past, Alexander installed her at a distance in the suburb of Streatham. Michael Bloch, Alexander's biographer, speculates that "for some years she may have been the one person before whom he never had to pretend, with whom he was able to reminisce about his old life and friends in Australia, and who offered him intimate comforts."

Throughout his life, Alexander was a private man who enjoyed social company, but he was not a party-goer and did not join clubs or societies. Instead of close friendships, he tended to have disciples and supporters. In 1909, as also happened frequently throughout his life, Alexander fell out with a friend and supporter, in this case Dr. Spicer. In a series of papers, Spicer, who clearly believed that Alexander lacked medical knowledge, claimed corrections of posture and respiration for the medical profession rather "untrained amateurs and ignorant quacks". Alexander responded with pamphlets accusing Spicer of plagiarism and distortion. As a consequence of this dispute, Alexander finally produced a long-contemplated book, which appeared in three parts: Man's Supreme Inheritance (October 1910), an Addenda (March 1911), and Conscious Control (October 1912). These were combined into one volume in 1918.

In 1911 Alexander's mother and his sister Amy arrived for a visit and moved into his rooms at Army & Navy Mansions in Westminster, while Alexander lived and practiced at the nearby 16 Ashley Place. Amy began to teach some of Alexander's female pupils, and before the end of 1911 it appears to have been decided that the visitors would remain permanently, and that other members of the Alexander family would come to join them. Over the next few years, four of Alexander's siblings moved to London.

His father and other brothers did not make the move. Estranged from her husband, Betsy Alexander claimed to be a widow. Alexander's brother A.R. joined the growing practice, which included pupils such as the politician Reginald McKenna, the businessman Waldorf Astor, and Edith, Viscountess Castlereagh. Alexander also engaged Ethel Webb, a former pupil, as a teacher, the first from outside his family. She connected Alexander to two other women who would be important to his work, Irene Tasker and Margaret Naumburg. The latter, an American, offered to help him fulfill a long-held desire: to introduce the approach in the United States. On 10 August 1914, before a month his departure, he married Edith Young at a registry office wedding. Her husband, Robert had died in September 1910, and Alexander had supported her since that time. The couple were, however, to spend much of the years that followed apart.

== American years, 1914–1924 ==
Alexander sailed for New York in September 1914, where he joined Margaret Naumburg. Influenced by Montessori education, psychoanalysis and Alexander's work, she had just founded the Walden School, and assisted Alexander in setting up a practice, including recruiting influential pupils such as Arthur M. Reis and Waldo Frank. The business was soon booming, and by the end of 1914, Ethel Webb came from the United Kingdom to assist in the teaching. With the exception of the winter of 1921–22, for the next ten years, Alexander spent the autumn and winter of the year in the United States, and returned to the United Kingdom for the late spring and summer to see family members and rest. For the first few years, Webb remained in the US to keep the practice open over the summer months. In 1916 Irene Tasker, joined the New York practice as an apprentice. Alexander was proudly British; he never really felt at home in the United States, and was critical of American society, including their lack of involvement, until 1917, in the First World War.

In 1916, the American philosopher and educational pioneer John Dewey became a pupil. Dewey had long suffered from stress-related health issues, and these had become acute in the wake of a series of personal and professional difficulties. His series of lessons resulted in long-lasting physical and intellectual improvements; more than 25 years later, in his eighties, Dewey attributed 90% of his good health to Alexander's techniques. Dewey and Alexander met frequently in the years that followed, and the writings of both show the influence of the interactions.

In addition, Dewey's promotion of the technique led to other prominent academics to enroll themselves and their families. Dewey also encouraged Alexander to bring out an American edition of Man's Supreme Inheritance. With the help of Irene Tasker, he extensively revised the text and included new chapters on addictions, obsessive behaviours, and on the causes of the First World War, which he laid firmly at the door of Germany as a country of that has "progressed but little on the upward evolutionary stage from the state occupied by the brute beast and the savage." The book, with an introduction by Dewey, appeared in January 1918, and received enthusiastic reviews, many written by Alexander's distinguished pupils. However, former pupil Randolph Bourne, writing in The New Republic, while recognising the practical benefit of the technique, criticised Alexander's belief in the evolution of human society towards conscious control, a complaint echoed by the historian James Harvey Robinson in an Atlantic Monthly review. Dewey was so incensed by Bourne's review that he threatened never to contribute to the New Republic again if they published any further articles by Bourne.

The success of the book led to an influx of new pupils to the practice. The demand meant that A.R. was needed in the United States for the winters of 1918–19 and 1919–20; that he was able to do so was a testimony to "the work", as A.R. had received serious injuries in a fall from a horse in 1918, and had been told by doctors that he would never walk again. For the rest of his life, however, A.R. used a cane and taught sitting down. From 1920 the brothers began periodic teaching in Boston, and started providing a continuous presence in America and London: each summer for the next four years A.R. continued teaching in the US, only going back to the United Kingdom when Alexander returned to America in the fall.

Post war, the London practice at No. 16 Ashley Place (near Victoria Station) was also doing well, and both Ethel Webb and Irene Tasker returned to work there. Prominent pupils during this period included a future Archbishop of Canterbury William Temple and the chocolate manufacturer Joseph Rowntree. He also developed good relations with several doctor pupils, who helped him and, in the case of two of them, Andrew Rugg-Gunn, J. E. R. McDonagh, became lifelong friends.

Alexander's charismatic personality often led to romantic feelings in women; among those smitten was Ethel Webb, who had spent more time with Alexander than his wife. The two women hated each other. Alexander and Edith's marriage was in difficulties: but the pair agreed to adopt Peggy Piddock, born in 1918, the daughter of Edith's younger sister May, and they were both devoted to their daughter, which likely kept the couple together. Her nephew 27-year-old ex-army officer Owen Vicary moved into the basement flat at Ashley Place with his wife Gladys (known as Jack) and their two children, and Edith appears to have developed romantic feelings for him. Alexander was considering writing another book, and was spurred into action by the 1922 publication of a book by Gerald Stanley Lee which clearly described Alexander's techniques without acknowledging their originator. He considered patenting the method, but was told this would be impractical. His book "Constructive Conscious Control of the Individual", which Alexander was later to describe as his most important book, was published in May 1923 in United States with an introduction written by Dewey. Alexander missed the launch as he had to return to the UK due to family difficulties following his mother's death in February 1923 while Alexander was in the United States. Despite being clearer, more coherent and better written, it received less notice than its predecessor.

Following a lawsuit in 1923 resulting from an attempted return of a new car after a few weeks, Alexander transferred all his considerable assets to friends and arranged to be declared bankrupt rather than pay the debt he owed. The debt was later bought and cancelled by friends, but Alexander never applied for discharge from bankruptcy and thus remained technically bankrupt until the end of his life. Alexander's regular visits to America ended in the spring of 1924, and from then on both he and A.R. were based in London. His bankruptcy notwithstanding, he was financially successful and had a flourishing practice in London and could afford to live where he felt happiest. Another possible reason was to distance himself from Dewey, who was proposing a scientific trial of the technique; the prospect alarmed Alexander as he had no confidence in the investigation and in addition feared a loss of control over the technique.

== England, 1925–1940, 1943–1956 ==
In March 1925, Alexander bought an 18th-century farmhouse Penhill with 20 acres (81,000 m^{2}) of grounds, in Sidcup, Kent. The property included a lodge, occupied by a family of 5, all of whom worked in house or grounds. Edith and their daughter Peggy took up residence, with Alexander joining them at the weekends to ride his horse and tend his garden. They were soon joined by Jack Vicary, who having left her husband, moved to a cottage near Penhill in which she ran a shop. Initially, there was a good relationship between the two households, and the Alexanders' relationship went through a happier period.

However, in 1929, the two separated; Edith had become jealous of Alexander's work and relationships, especially those with women, and bitter about her own aging and lack of success. Edith moved back to Little Venice in London, and Peggy spent the weekdays with her, and weekends at Penhill with her father. Edith became an alcoholic, and died in 1938. Alexander had become increasingly attracted to Jack, and the two began an affair, which resulted in the birth of a son, John Vicary, born in the US in June 1931. Jack had travelled there for the sake of respectability, and claimed to have adopted John there. At Ashley Place, the "little school" was founded with Irene Tasker as teacher, not only of the Alexander Technique, but also of academics. About six to eight students, most of whom had disabilities of some sort, attended at first, but the numbers grew to a dozen by 1933, requiring a move to a larger space. After a false start involving Esther Lawrence, a wealthy former principal of the Froebel Institute, who had offered Alexander a large, furnished house, the school moved to Penhill in 1934 and became a boarding school.

In 1924 Alexander's approach received a boost from a theoretical perspective when the German professor Rudolf Magnus published his book about the physiology of posture. As his supporters were quick to note, Magnus' scientific conclusions in many ways mirrored many of Alexander's longstanding principles, including that correct functioning is dependent on the alignment of the head, neck and back, and on correct sensory perception. Critics pointed out differences between the two theories, however, and the current view is that the two theories are related but describe different concepts.

Alexander also attracted several important new pupils, including the statesman Victor Bulwer-Lytton, 2nd Earl of Lytton who drew public attention to the technique in the Times Educational Supplement, the initially skeptical writer Anthony Ludovici who went on to praise Alexander's approach in a book, and the industrialist Robert Dudley Best who supported the Alexander Technique, including the expansion of teaching to Birmingham, but also challenged Alexander, including writing a 1941 essay of constructive criticism. In particular, Best complained about Alexander's explanations and dismissive responses to pupils, and his expectation of unquestioning acceptance of his work. He viewed Alexander as limited in his perspective, with little awareness of the artistic and spiritual, and constrained by the view that he had the solution to all problems in life that his approach answered.

The first teacher training course was started in February 1931, at Ashley Place, Alexander was known as "F.M." to the trainees. The course continued alongside his own practice until 1940, when it was suspended because of the war. Some of Alexander's teachers entered the services, and Alexander himself relocated to the United States from 1940 until 1943. Fearing that the technique would be lost, he returned to London in 1943 and successfully restarted the training course.

At the end of the war, in 1944, Dr. Dorothy Morrison (née Drew), hoping for improvement to her own 'use' (following injury in a car crash) and to the health of her disabled mother, joined the small group of Alexander's pupils at Ashley Place. Dorothy became a close friend of Alexander's at that time, gave medical evidence at the Libel case in South Africa and soon after lived there in Johannesburg with her family.

A portrait in oil of Alexander, painted to commemorate his 80th birthday by the Australian artist Colin Colahan, was shown on the BBC's Antiques Roadshow programme in May 2013, when it was still in the possession of the son of the wife of his nephew.

== Libel case, 1942–1948 ==
The last decade of Alexander's life was dominated by a libel case, a drama drawn out over a period of seven years.

=== Background ===
In 1935, Irene Tasker, one of Alexander's first students, arrived in Johannesburg, deciding to teach the Alexander Technique in South Africa. Her address to the annual conference of the Transvaal Teachers Association on the subject initially attracted much interest from teachers, soon spreading to others. In 1939 Tasker started a school, in Sherwood Road, Forest Town, to teach the Alexander Technique to children, where the children could be educated along the lines set out by Maria Montessori at the same time as attention was paid to the way in which they used themselves.

In 1942 Tasker's work attracted the attention of Dr Ernst Jokl, Director of Physical Education to the South African Government, and a writer on the physiology of exercise. Jokl asked Tasker to demonstrate the Technique to him, which she did in the presence of two legal witnesses, Norman Coaker KC and Adv. Vernon Berrangé, but declined to give him a course of lessons, instead suggesting that Jokl go to see Alexander himself. Jokl, not being able to go to London, read Alexander's books. In April the next year, in an address to the annual conference of the Transvaal Teachers Association, its president, Mr. I. G. Griffiths, praised the Alexander Technique and criticized the established regime of physical education then given to children. His address was published in Transvaal Educational News, and Jokl, seeing this address as an attack on his profession, responded in a paper called 'The Relationship between Health and Efficiency' which he read to the South African Association for the Advancement of Science. Jokl then had his paper published in Transvaal Educational News, with a reply defending Alexander's work.

In March 1944 Jokl wrote an article in the South African government journal Manpower (Afrikaans Volkskragte) entitled 'Quackery versus Physical Education' which described the Technique as, among other things, 'a dangerous and irresponsible form of quackery'. In August of that year Alexander was shown the article by Tasker, and responded with a letter to the South African High Commissioner in London asking for a public withdrawal of the remarks and an apology. Having had no reply a year later, Alexander sued: he issued a writ for libel against Jokl, Eustace H. Cluver and Bernard Maule Clarke (the co-editors of Manpower) suing for £5000 damages for alleged defamation. Alexander was dismayed that the South African authorities announced the case would be defended, but however he expected a case to be won quickly.

=== Examination in London ===
As witnesses on both sides were British, it was easier for evidence on both sides to be presented before a Commission in South Africa House in London, but due to delays this did not happen until July 1947. Alexander and Jokl attended all the hearings. Alexander's witnesses included Duncan Whittaker, Dr Peter Macdonald, Lord Lytton, Sir Stafford Cripps, Dr Dorothy Drew, his personal physician J. E. R. McDonagh, and his friend Andrew Rugg-Gunn FRCS. Jokl's witnesses were Nobel Prizewinners Edgar Adrian and Sir Henry Dale, Brigadier Wand-Tetley, heart specialist Dr Paul Wood, bacteriologist Dr Freddie Himmelweit, Sir Alfred Webb-Johnson, Samson Wright, Lieut-Col S. J. Parker and Robert Clark-Turner. The trial was scheduled to be in South Africa in the autumn of 1947, but there was delay due to the defence counsel Oswald Pirow having another matter to deal with, and the case was rescheduled to the following March.

=== Alexander's stroke ===
Alexander wanted to go, and booked a stateroom in a Union Castle liner for himself. But that was not to happen. He was worried about the case, distraught over the death of his friend Lord Lytton in October 1947, and that autumn he had a fall which may have contributed to his having a stroke in December. A week later he had another stroke, was left with the paralysis of his left hand, leg and face, and doctors had little hope for him. He had to cancel his trip to South Africa. However, he made a remarkable recovery within a month, it was said by applying his own technique to himself. He wrote to Irene Tasker in South Africa, in a clear hand, telling her how much better he was.

=== In Court in Johannesburg ===
In February 1948 three of his medically qualified students, Dr Wilfred Barlow, F.R.S., Dr Dorothy Drew M.R.C.S (Eng), L.R.C.P (Lon) and Dr Mungo Douglas flew to Johannesburg to give evidence to the Court. Douglas did not give evidence: his place was taken by Norman Coaker, K.C. who lived in South Africa and, like Jokl, had seen Irene Tasker. There was great interest in the case. The papers reported all the proceedings, and every day the court was crowded.

On 14 February the case Alexander v. Jokl and others, an action for £5,000 damages for alleged defamation opened before Mr Justice Clayden in the Witwatersrand Local Division of the Supreme Court. Mr H. J. Hanson, K.C and Mr Abram Fischer (instructed by Messrs Berrangé and Wasserzug) appeared for the plaintiff, and Mr O. Pirow, K.C. and Mr M. van Hulsteyn (instructed by the Government Attorney) appeared for the defendants. In an introductory address Mr Hanson said that Alexander's technique and ideas had received favourable comment from such eminent people as Sir Charles Sherrington, John Dewey, Aldous Huxley, Sir Stafford Cripps and others. In his books Alexander taught what he had observed in his investigation into the use and mis-use of the body. He taught people to understand their own use, to unlearn the wrong way, as in the example of a person sitting at a desk having a tendency to hunch the shoulders by tensing muscles unnecessarily. Mr Hanson told the court that Alexander had recently had a stroke and would therefore not be able to give evidence.

Dr Barlow was Alexander's first witness. He described how he had hurt his shoulder in sport at Oxford, had tried various ways of remedying it, had read Alexander's books and realised that a problem was that people who used their muscles in the wrong way could come to regard that use as the right way. He went to London, saw Alexander, became of student and later a qualified teacher of the method. He had seen for himself in St Thomas' Hospital in London how the technique could help in the treatment of bad muscular co-ordination or misuse, and quoted supporting text from recognised publications such as The Lancet, the British Medical Journal and the American Medical Association's Journal.

Mr Pirow, for the defence, proposed that his case was that the article (by Jokl and others) represented an evaluation of Alexander's four books, which claimed to set out the technique and its philosophy, and contained not only mainly testimonials and sales talk advertising the technique, but in regard to his alleged discoveries of conscious and/or primary control, claims and statements representing dangerous quackery.

Pirow was expert at persistent cross-questioning, throwing leading questions at all Alexander's witnesses. Pirow asked Dr. Barlow: "Do you seriously contend, in the matter of conscious control, that anyone following fully its principles would become entirely disease free?" Barlow: "No-one suggests that man will become immortal." "Let us leave immortality out of it, and get down to fundamentals. Are you, as a trained medical man, prepared to accept as a reasonable possibility the suggestion that by the carrying out of the exercises of psycho-physical guidance by way of conscious control, one can get complete immunity against disease?" – "It might be possible...animals living in a wild state when they come to the end of their days do not suffer from many of the prevalent diseases." "So that by following the technique man would become like an animal or buffalo?" – "I am merely giving you my impression about the diseases which affect animals." "Do you seriously suggest that, as a result of psycho-physical guidance under conscious control, resistance to infectious disease might be better?" – "Well, yes." And Barlow said it was from his own medical experience. Pirow asked what conscious control was, about inhibition and their effects, to which Barlow was able to give confident answers.

Witness Dr Dorothy Drew, a London doctor, had become a convert to the Alexander Technique because of the benefit she had found to herself after undergoing a course. She had been injured in a car accident when she was a medical student, and during the war her health deteriorated. She had read Alexander's books in the war and became a pupil of Alexander's. At first she felt pain, but began to feel increasing benefit. Alexander's sole interest was in repairing her body mechanics, and her health had improved. She had sent about 200 patients to Alexander, supplementary to medical treatment: she always showed them his books and let them decide for themselves whether to see Alexander.

Norman Coaker, who had been present at Jokl's demonstration lesson with Irene Tasker, was the next witness for Alexander. He described how his two sons had been helped by Alexander lessons: his second son with an injury from a fall onto stone, and his elder son with chronic bronchitis.

Irene Tasker was Alexander's last witness, and at one point she found it difficult to give evidence and face Pirow's cross-questioning.

Dr Jokl himself was the last witness for the defence.

The trial finished in March, and Mr Justice Clayden delivered his judgement over a month later. Alexander was awarded £1000 damages plus costs.

A year later the defendants appealed against the verdict and the damages. The appeal was dismissed with costs, and the tone of the judgment was worded more in approval of Alexander than it had been originally.

== Final years ==
Alexander continued to work until his sudden death in 1955. His funeral was at South London Crematorium, Streatham Vale. The practice at 16 Ashley Place was taken over by one of his assistants, Patrick Macdonald.

== Famous pupils ==
Philosopher and education reformer John Dewey, who wrote about both his experience as a student of F.M. Alexander and about the importance of Alexander's work in introductions to three of Alexander's books: Man's Supreme Inheritance (in edition published in 1918), Constructive Conscious Control of the Individual (in original publication in 1923), and The Use of the Self (in original publication in 1932).

Cartoonist and illustrator Ronald Searle made an original drawing of F. M. Alexander, signed and with the comment "Ronald Searle 1953. For F. M. from the reconstituted artist, with thanks," Reproduced in F. M. Alexander's The Universal Constant in Living (Mouritz, 2000, London).

Actor Harry Brodribb Irving, son of Henry Irving, autographed a photo "To F. M. Alexander for his ... ? 1907".

Actress Viola Tree (1885–1938, daughter of Herbert Beerbohm Tree), autographed a full-length photo "To Matthias Alexander with many thanks from Viola Tree 1909".

Other actors who consulted him were Constance Collier, Oscar Asche and Matheson Lang.

While living and working in South Africa, Professor Raymond Dart, along with his two children, had lessons in the Alexander Technique.

The English novelist Aldous Huxley was strongly influenced by F. M. Alexander and included him as a character in his 1936 pacifist theme novel Eyeless in Gaza. (Note: F. M. Alexander is named in the last section of Chapter 2. Miller, the character whose description immediately resembles Alexander, appears at the beginning of Chapter 49.)

Gertrude Stein's brother Leo called the Technique "the method for keeping your eye on the ball applied to life".

The conservative philosopher and artist Anthony M. Ludovici was a pupil of Alexander's. Ludovici, sceptical at first, was sponsored by an admirer, Agnes Birrell, to have a course of lessons. He was the author of the first book on the Alexander Technique not by F.M. Alexander.

George Bernard Shaw was also a student of the Alexander Technique. Sir Charles Sherrington, Nobel Prize winner in physiology a strong supporter and Edward Maisel, tai chi Past Grandmaster, director of the American Physical Fitness Research Institute and a member of the President's Council on Physical Fitness wrote an introduction and made the selection from F. M. Alexander's writings published as The Resurrection of the Body.

Moshé Feldenkrais, developer of the Feldenkrais Method, had lessons with Alexander.

Politician Sir Stafford Cripps, at the time he was British Chancellor of the Exchequer, consulted Alexander. He and his wife Dame Isobel Cripps were both his supporters.

General Sir Archibald James Murray had lessons. He was chief of staff to the commander-in-chief of the British Expeditionary Force at the outbreak of WW1.

In 1945, Anthony Brooke, the Rajah Muda of Sarawak, had lessons with Alexander.

Alexander celebrated his 70th birthday in the company of Lord Lytton.

In 1973 Nikolaas Tinbergen devoted about half of his Nobel Prize acceptance speech to a very favorable description of the Alexander Technique and its benefits, including references to scientific evaluations. Tinbergen and his family had been students of the technique.

== Publications ==
The books of F. Matthias Alexander exist in many editions, being reprinted and revised, published in the UK and US, and not all editions are shown.

- Man's Supreme Inheritance, Methuen (UK, 1910), Paul R. Reynolds (US, 1910).
- Conscious Control: In Relation to Human Evolution in Civilization, Methuen (UK, 1912). Republished by Alexander Technique Centre Ireland (2015).
- Man's Supreme Inheritance: Conscious Guidance and Control in Relation to Human Evolution in Civilization, E. P. Dutton (US, 1918), Methuen (UK, 1918). The first two books combined, with revisions and additions. Later editions 1941 and 1946, scholarly edition Mouritz (UK, 1996, reprinted 2002, ISBN 0-9525574-0-1)
- Constructive Conscious Control of the Individual, E. P. Dutton (US, 1923), Methuen (UK, 1924), revised 1946, scholarly edition Mouritz (UK, 2004, ISBN 0-9543522-6-2)
- The Use of the Self, E. P. Dutton (US, 1932), Methuen (UK, 1932), republished by Orion Publishing, 2001, ISBN 9780752843919
- The Universal Constant in Living, E. P. Dutton (US, 1941), Chaterson (UK, 1942), later editions 1943, 1946, scholarly edition Mouritz (UK, 2000, ISBN 0-9525574-4-4)
- Articles and Lectures, Mouritz (UK, 1995 – A posthumous compilation of articles, published letters and lectures – ISBN 978-0952557463)
