= Pretoria City Hall =

- Pretoria Stadsaal
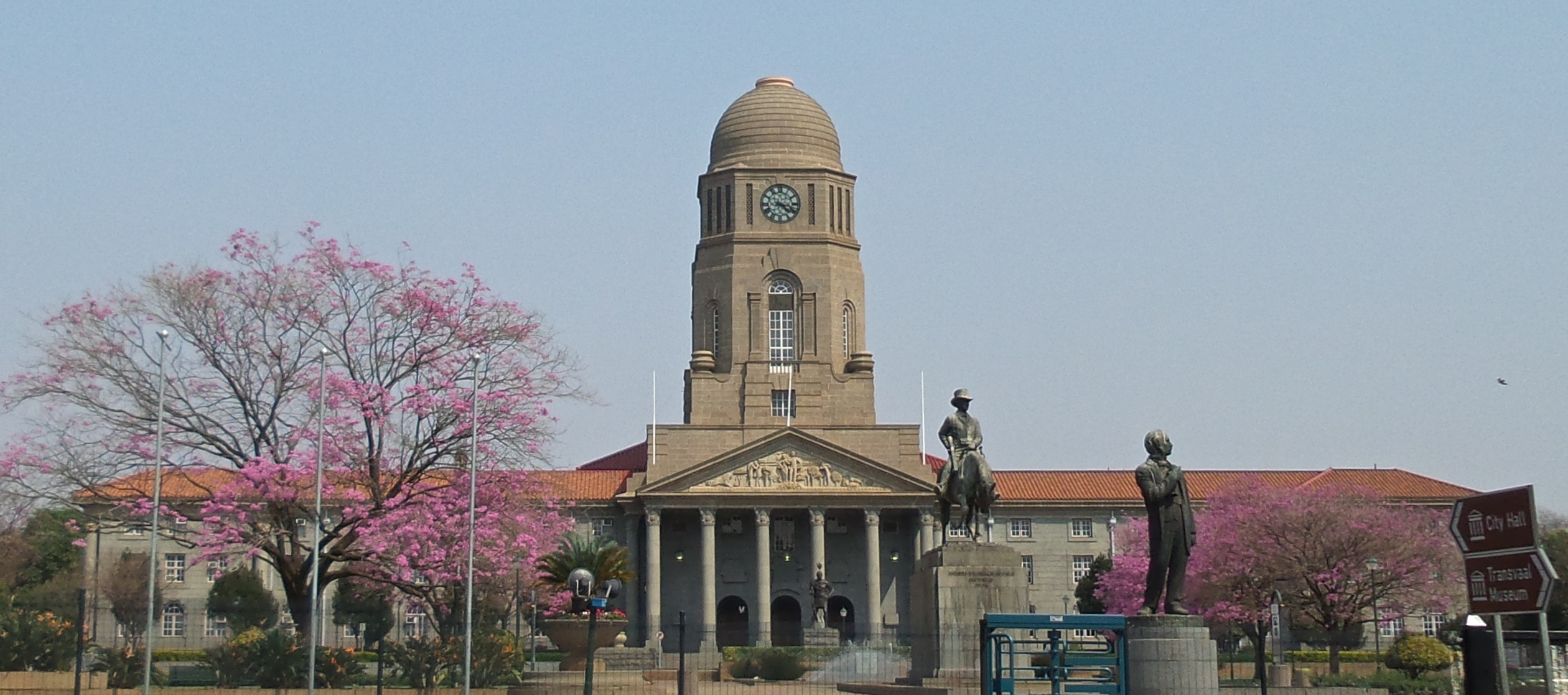
- Pretoria City Hall as seen from Pretorius Square.

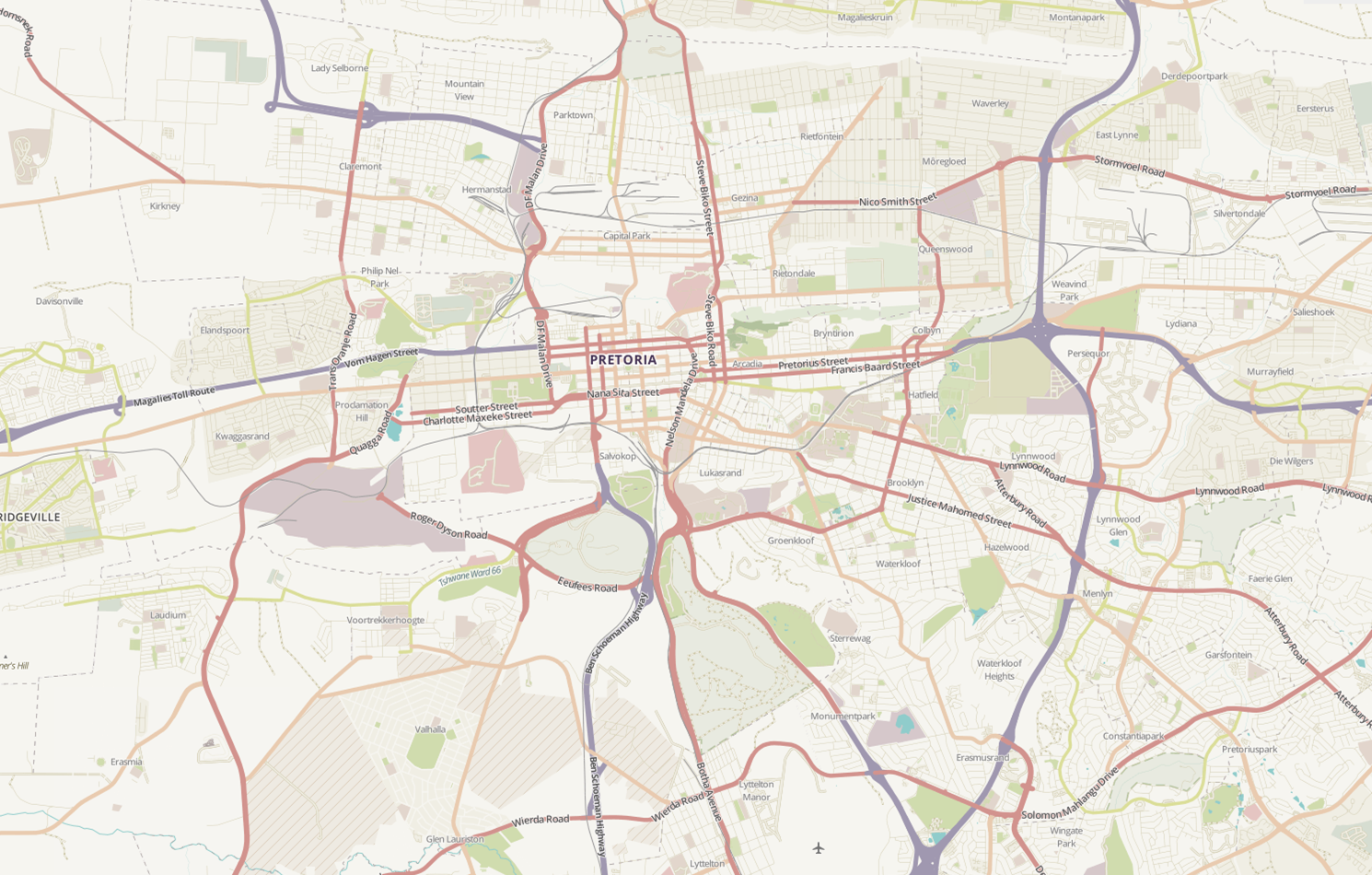
- Location within Pretoria Location within Gauteng

General information
- Status: Derelict
- Type: City Hall
- Architectural style: Semi-Italian classical style
- Location: Paul Kruger street, Pretoria, South Africa
- Coordinates: 25°45′12″S 28°11′13″E
- Construction started: 1931
- Completed: 1935
- Owner: City of Tshwane Metropolitan Municipality

References
- http://gopretoria.co.za/pretoria-city-hall

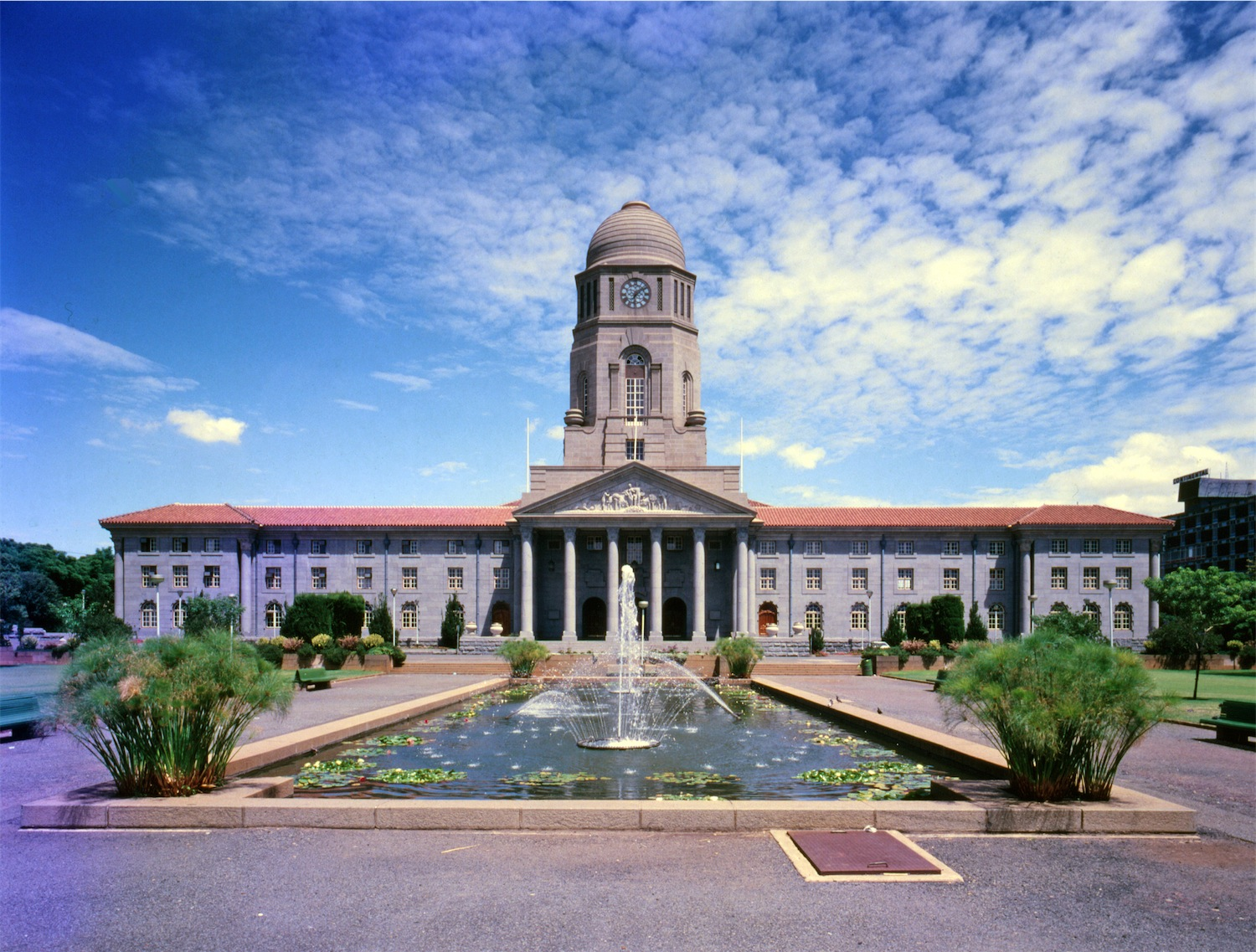
The City Hall in 1988

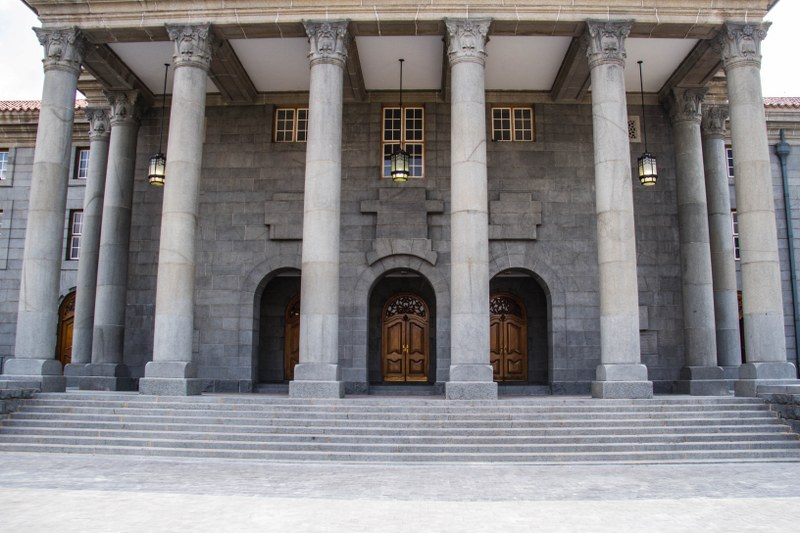
Close-up view of the portico

Pretoria City Hall is a large building in Pretoria city centre, South Africa, which was built in 1931 and inaugurated in 1935 in order to celebrate the city-status of Pretoria obtained in 1931. It is located on the Paul Kruger Street south of Church Square and across the street from the Transvaal Museum.

== History ==
In 1926 a competition was held to design the future city hall of Pretoria and the winning design was by F.G. McIntosh. Due to the economic difficulties of the then South African Republic, construction of the City Hall started in 1931 and was completed in 1935.

The Hall was completed in the Semi-Italian classical style and a George Heys, the former owner of Melrose House donated the 32 tower bells found in the hall today.

=== Pretorius Square ===
The Pretorius Square lies in front of the building including fountains and maintained gardens. Three statues of significant figures decorate the park;

- Marthinus Wessel Pretorius, the founder of Pretoria who named the city in honour of his father in 1855.
- Andries Pretorius, a Voortrekker leader who led the push to settle the North of the country and for who the city is named.
- Chief Tshwane, the Tshwane Metropolitan Municipality, under which Pretoria falls was named for this local Chieftain.

== Contemporary use ==
The hall used to serve as a venue for concerts and organized events including weddings. The main auditorium has a large stage and was used for classical music concerts and many other social events. But since 2016, it has been closed to the general use of the public. It seems that the current council has no intention of opening it up to the public ever again.

== Future use ==
TBA
