= Trolleybuses in Pretoria =

Pretoria trolleybus system

Operation
- Locale: Pretoria, South Africa
- Open: 1 July 1939; 87 years ago
- Close: 21 February 1972; 54 years ago
- Status: Closed

The Pretoria trolleybus system was part of the public transport network in Pretoria, South Africa, for more than 30 years in the mid-twentieth century. The trolleybus system was opened in 1939 and was closed in 1972, lasting for over 32 years.

== See also ==
- History of Pretoria
- List of trolleybus systems
