= Treaty of Vereeniging =

1902 peace treaty which ended the Second Boer War

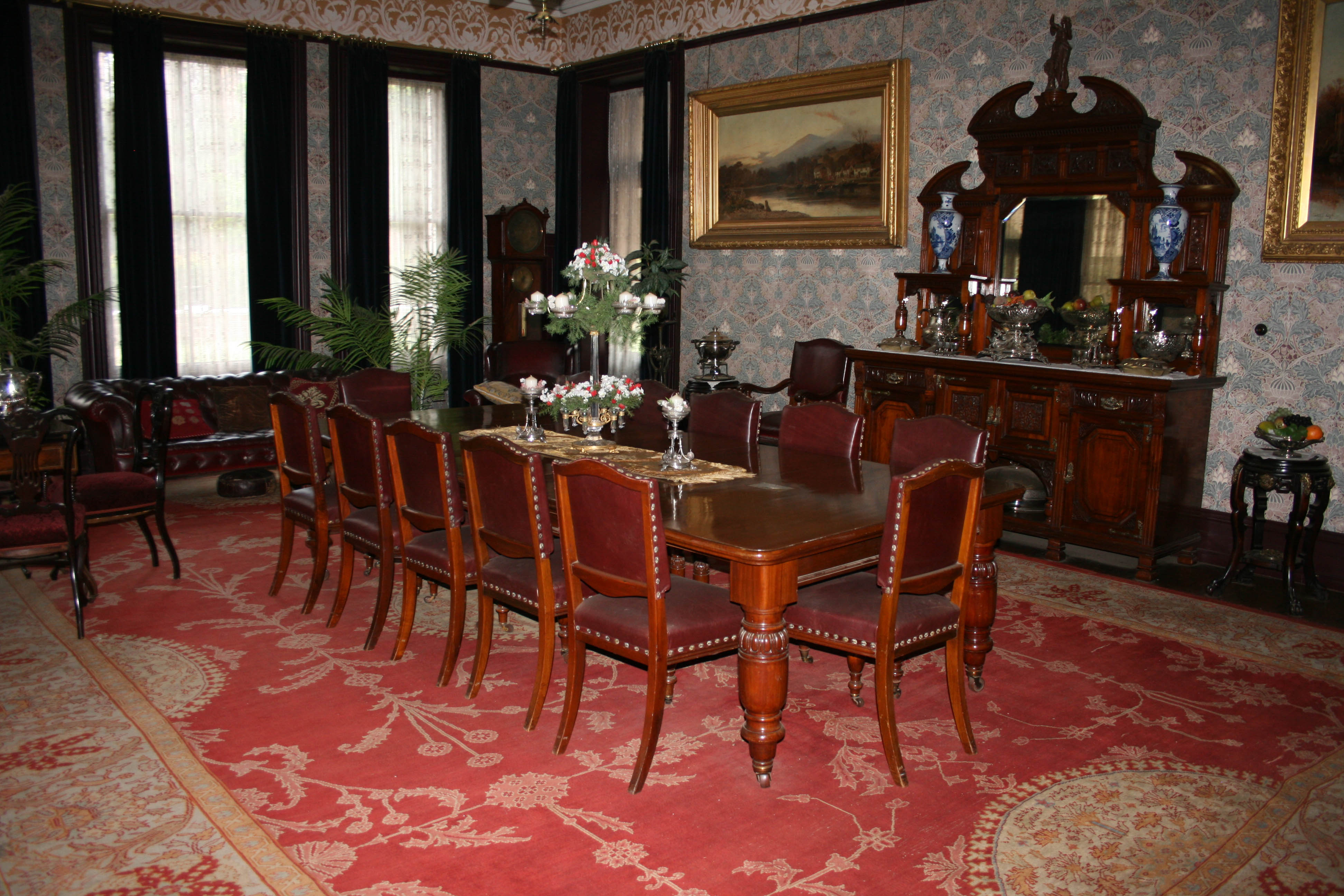
- Melrose House, Pretoria
- Context: End of the Second Boer War
- Signed: 31 May 1902
- Location: Melrose House, Pretoria, South African Republic
- Signatories: Sir Alfred Milner; Lord Kitchener; Schalk Willem Burger; Francis William Reitz; Louis Botha; Koos de la Rey; Lucas Johannes Meyer; Johannes Christoffel Krogh; Christiaan de Wet; J. B. M. Hertzog; C. H. Olivier; W. J. C. Brebner
- Parties: United Kingdom; Transvaal; Orange Free State

Full text
- Peace of Vereeniging at Wikisource

Peace Treaty of Vereeniging, 31 May 1902. Pdf file of four pages.

The Treaty of Vereeniging was a peace treaty, signed on 31 May 1902, that ended the Second Boer War between the South African Republic and the Orange Free State on the one side, and the United Kingdom on the other.

This settlement provided for the end of hostilities and eventual self-government to the Transvaal (South African Republic) and the Orange Free State as British colonies. The Boer republics agreed to come under the sovereignty of the British Crown and the British government agreed on various details.

== History ==
=== Seven point Boer proposal rejected ===
On 9 April 1902, with safe passage guaranteed by the British, the Boer leadership met at Klerksdorp, Transvaal. Present were Marthinus Steyn, Free State president and Schalk Burger acting Transvaal president with the Boer generals Louis Botha, Jan Smuts, Christiaan de Wet and Koos de la Rey and they would discuss the progress of the war and whether negotiations should be opened with the British.

On 12 April, a ten-man Boer delegation went to Melrose House in Pretoria and met General Kitchener bringing with them a seven-point proposal for a treaty of friendship. Their position was to return to a pre-war status-quo for the republics with certain changes such as a commercial union with the British colonies, votes for uitlanders, equal languages in schools and an amnesty. Kitchener was astounded but forwarded the proposal to London, knowing it would not be accepted but wanted the dialogue between the two parties to continue. Alfred Milner joined the negotiations on 14 April but he was hostile to the Boers and wanted an unconditional surrender and a free rein in administering the two republics as colonies. The British government rejected the Boers' terms and the delegation asked Kitchener for a series of armistices so that they could return and consult with the commandos as to whether they could negotiate a surrender and its terms.

=== Sixty delegates compromise at Vereeniging ===
On 15 May, the commandos elected 30 delegates from each pre-war republic and they met at Vereeniging. They included for Transvaal some non-combatant burghers but mostly military officers like Chris Botha, Jan Celliers from Lichtenburg, Jan Kemp (Krugersdorp), P. J. Liebenberg (Potchefstroom), Chris Muller (Boksburg), D. J. Schoeman (Lydenburg), S. P. du Toit (Wolmaransstad) and J. J. Alberts (Standerton). The Orange Free State was represented by for instance L.P.H. Botha (Harrismith), G.A. Brand (Bethulie, Caledon River, Rouxville, Wepener and East Bloemfontein), D.H. van Coller (Heilbron), C. C. Froneman (Winburg and Ladybrand), J.N. Jacobs (Boshof), C. A. van Niekerk (Kroonstad), W. J. Wessels (Harrismith and Vrede).

The debate was heated, split between the Transvaalers who wanted an end to the war as living conditions for the Boer civilians in the Transvaal were becoming desperate with splits developing in the Boer population there, while the Free Staters wished to continue the war.

A compromise was reached and the generals returned to Pretoria on 19 May with a proposal that the republics remain independent, with foreign relations and self-government under British control, cede control of Swaziland and relinquish control of the Witwatersrand goldfields.

=== Boers and British debate ===
The terms were rejected by Kitchener and Milner with the two of them disagreeing on the direction of the future, with the former seeking reconciliation and the latter seeking humiliation. The debate between the Boer generals and British delegation would continue for days. The British made concessions which included the Cape rebels only being disenfranchised for five years.

The issue of black enfranchisement was settled, when Joseph Chamberlain's argument before the war for black people's political rights to be considered at the end of the war was ignored in the interest of reconciliation, and Smuts was able to include a clause that the argument for black enfranchisement would be decided when self-government was realised for the Transvaal and Free State. As to the contentious issue of British and Boer war debt and promissory notes, Botha wanted £3 million while the British offered £1 million, with Milner angry at the idea of paying for Boer promissory notes, but Kitchener agreed seeing Botha's viewpoint that it would strengthen the latter in negotiating the terms with his delegates. The Orange River and the Transvaal colonies would first be administered by a British military administration, then by civilians and then at some point in the future via self-government.

=== Peace Treaty ===
On 27 May 1902, the British Cabinet met to discuss the final terms of the treaty and on 28 May in Pretoria, the Boers were presented with the terms and given three days to make a decision of which the answer required was either yes or no.

Sixty Boer delegates met in Vereeniging to debate the terms of the treaty and a heated debate developed between the Transvaalers and Free Staters, with Botha and Smuts arguing in favour while Marthinus Steyn argued against it. Being ill, he would resign as Free State president after the first day of debate and advised Christiaan de Wet that, if the Transvaalers agreed to the treaty, he should too, as the Free State could not continue the war on their own.

At around 2 pm on 31 May 1902 a vote was called and 54 delegates voted yes to the terms of the treaty, only 6 voted no. On the same day the Boer leaders returned to Kitchener at Melrose House in Pretoria and the peace treaty was signed. Although the treaty is named after the town of Vereeniging in Transvaal, where the peace negotiations took place, the document was actually signed at Melrose House in Pretoria.

== Terms of the settlement ==
This settlement entailed the end of hostilities and the surrender of all Boer forces and their arms to the British, with the promise of eventual self-government to the Transvaal (South African Republic) and the Orange Free State as colonies of the British Empire. The Boer Republics agreed to come under the sovereignty of the British Crown and the British government agreed on various details including the following:

1. All Boer fighters of both republics had to give themselves up
2. All combatants would be disarmed
3. Everyone had to swear allegiance to the Crown
4. No death penalties would be dealt out
5. A general amnesty would apply
6. The use of Dutch would be allowed in the schools and law courts
7. To eventually give the Transvaal and the Orange Free State self-government (civil government was granted in 1906 and 1907, respectively)
8. To avoid discussing the native (Black) enfranchisement issue until self-government had been given
9. To pay the Boers £3,000,000 in reconstruction aid
10. Property rights of Boers would be respected
11. No land taxes would be introduced
12. Registered private guns would be allowed

== Aftermath ==
Subsequent to the British government giving the Boer colonies self-government, the Union of South Africa was created on 31 May 1910. The Union gained relative independence under the 1926 Imperial Conference and de facto independence under the 1931 Statute of Westminster. The country withdrew from the British Commonwealth and became a republic in 1961, therefore severing all political ties with Great Britain. Though still a republic, South Africa rejoined the Commonwealth in 1994.

== See also ==
- History of South Africa
- Military history of South Africa
- Pretoria Convention
