= Melrose House =

Historic mansion in Pretoria, South Africa

Coordinates: 25.7555°S 28.1925°E

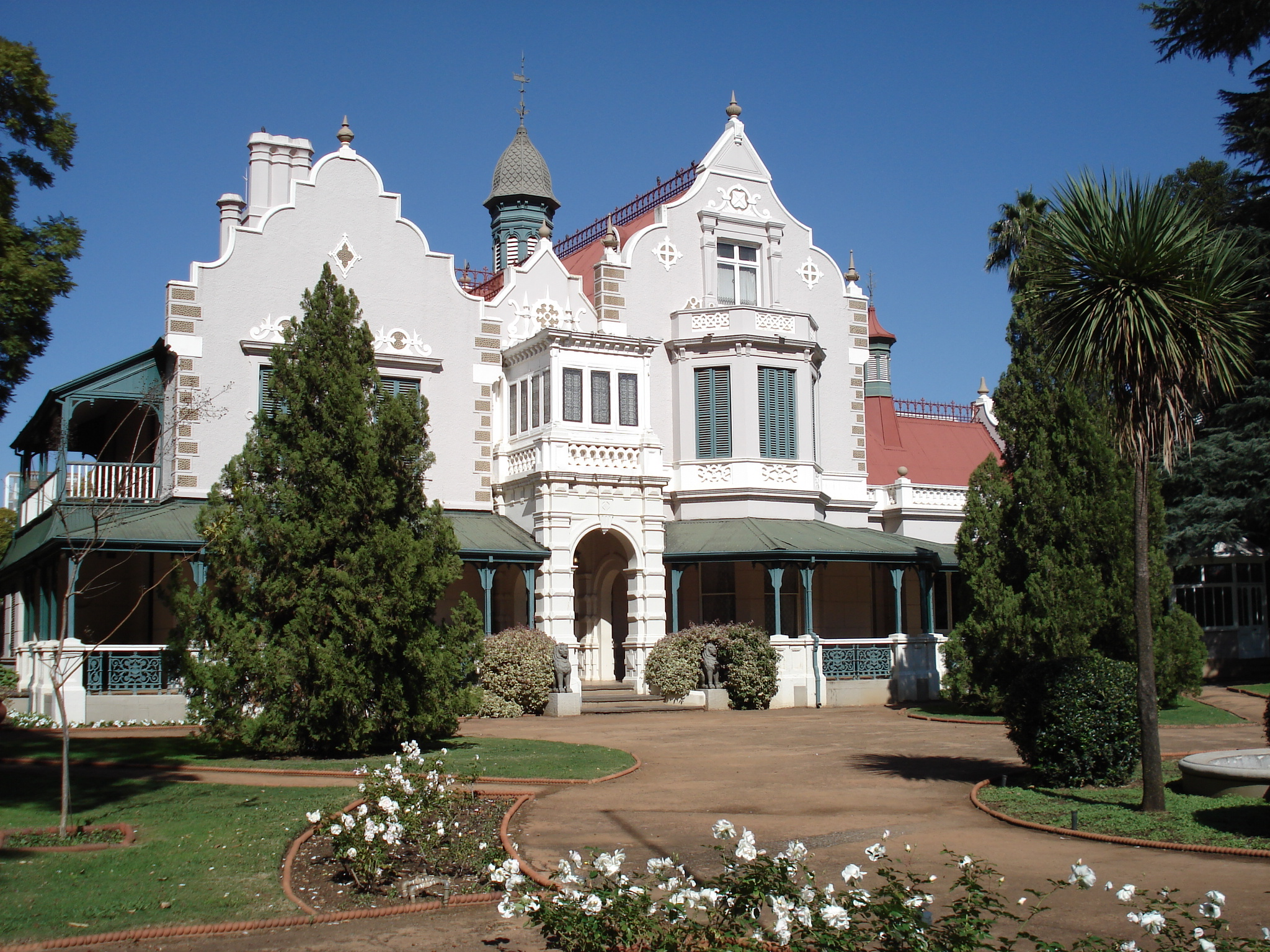
- Interactive map of the Melrose House area

General information
- Architectural style: Edwardian and Victorian
- Location: 275 Jeff Masemola Street and 280 Scheiding Street, Pretoria, South Africa

Design and construction
- Architect: WT Vale

Melrose House is a stately mansion and museum located opposite Burgers Park in Pretoria, South Africa.

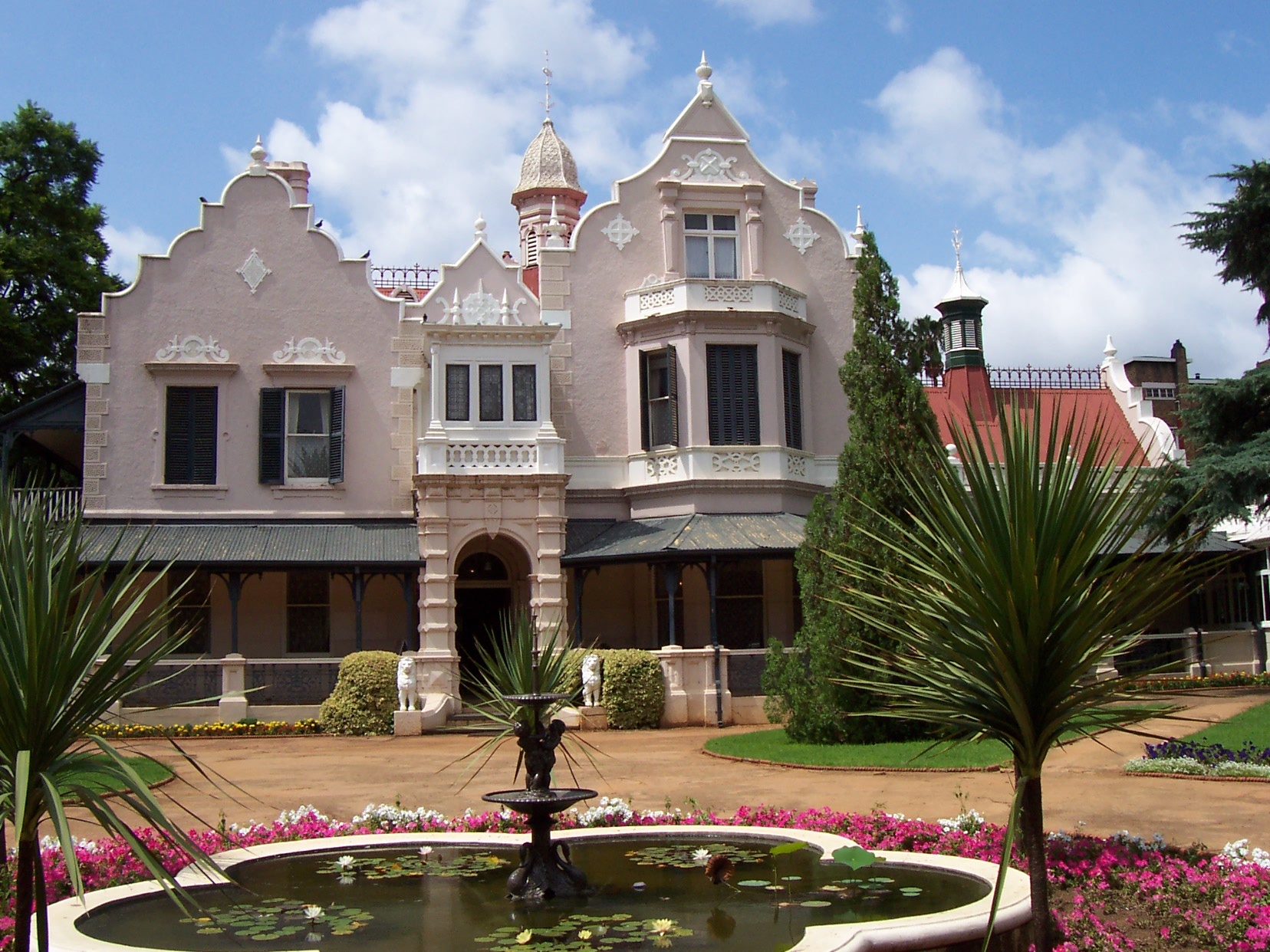
Melrose House in 2005.

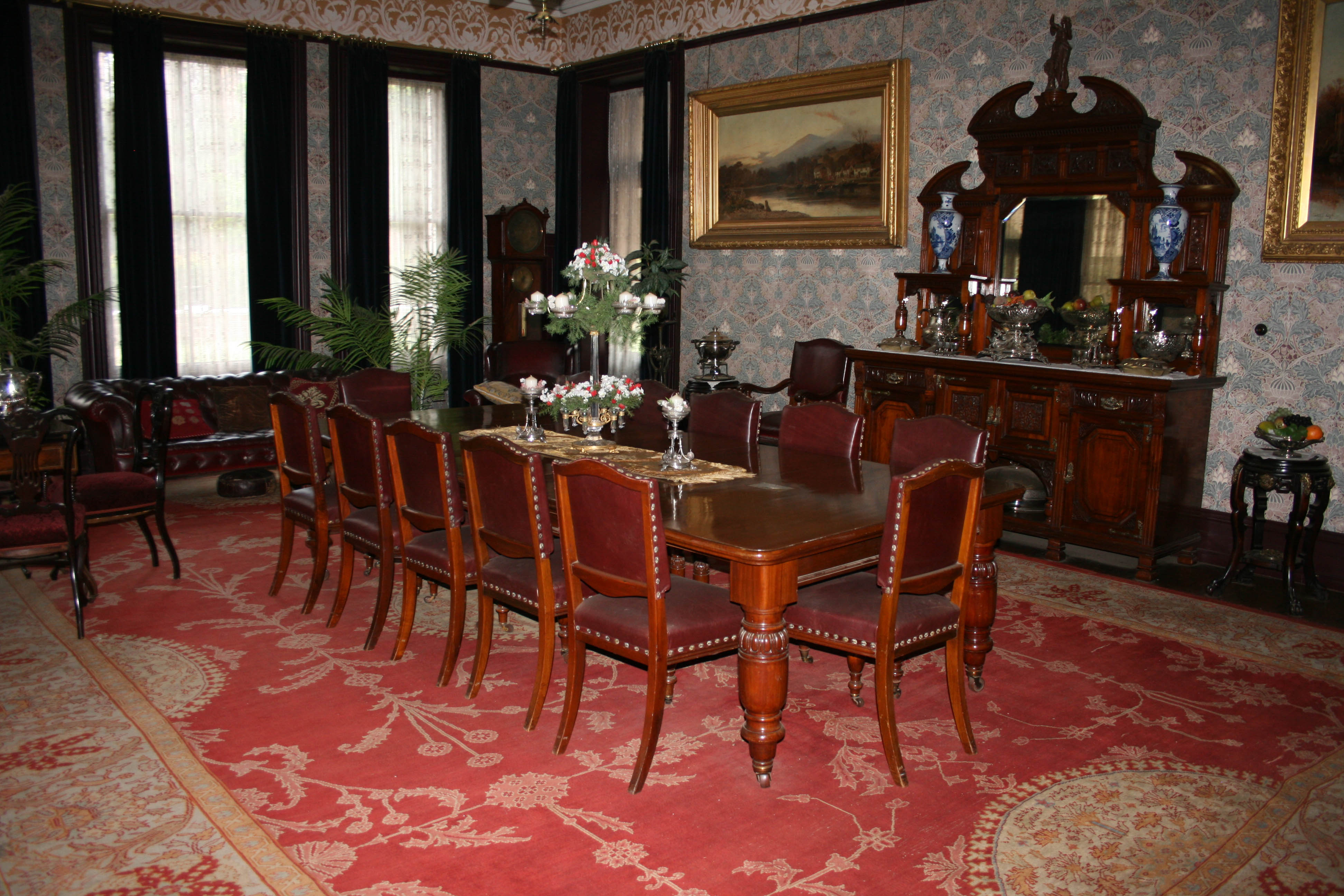
Table where Treaty of Vereeniging was signed

== History ==
Built in 1886 by the prosperous Pretoria businessman George Jesse Heys, it was named after the famous Melrose Abbey in Scotland. Melrose House gained fame during the Second Boer War (1899–1902) when Lord Roberts requisitioned it as the headquarters for the British forces after Pretoria was invaded in June 1900. For more than 18 months, instructions for the British forces in the field were issued from here. The use of the house as a military headquarters ended when the Treaty of Vereeniging, which ended the war, was signed there on 31 May 1902.

The Pretoria City Council purchased the house and its contents in 1967 for R300,000 for restoration, culminating in State President of South Africa Charles Robberts Swart opening it as a museum and declaring it a national heritage site on May 17, 1971.

== Museum ==
Today the elegant mansion is a historic house museum. It is an example of the transition from Victorian to Edwardian architectural styles and interiors. The interior is characterised by colourful stained glass windows, paintings by English artists, carpets in rich colours, ornate ceilings and fireplaces, as well as valuable porcelain ornaments. The majority of these items belonged to the Heys family itself. Notably the museum contains the room and the table on which the Treaty of Vereeniging (which ended the Second Boer War) was signed. Annual antique markets are held on the premises.

== Gallery ==
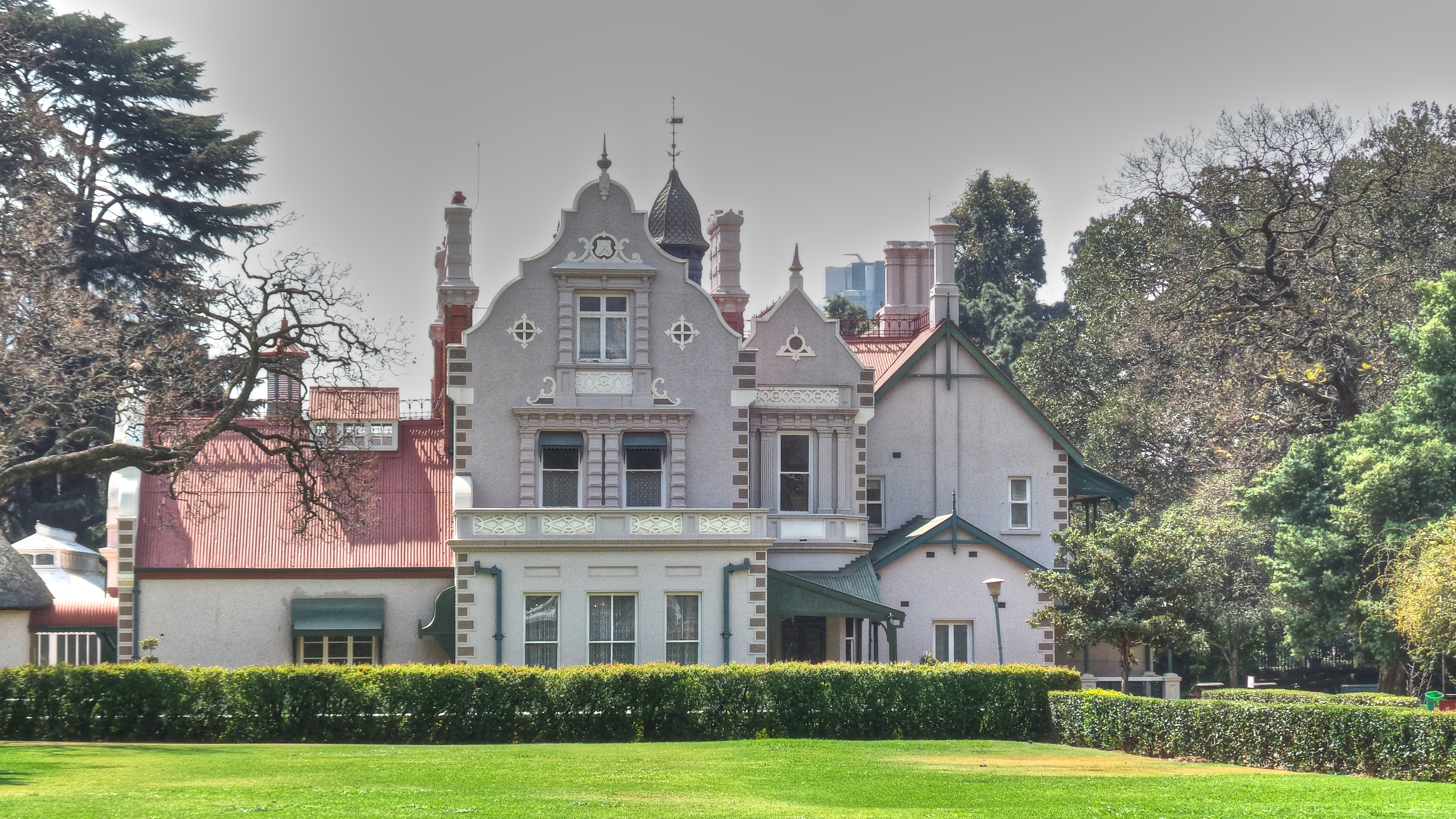

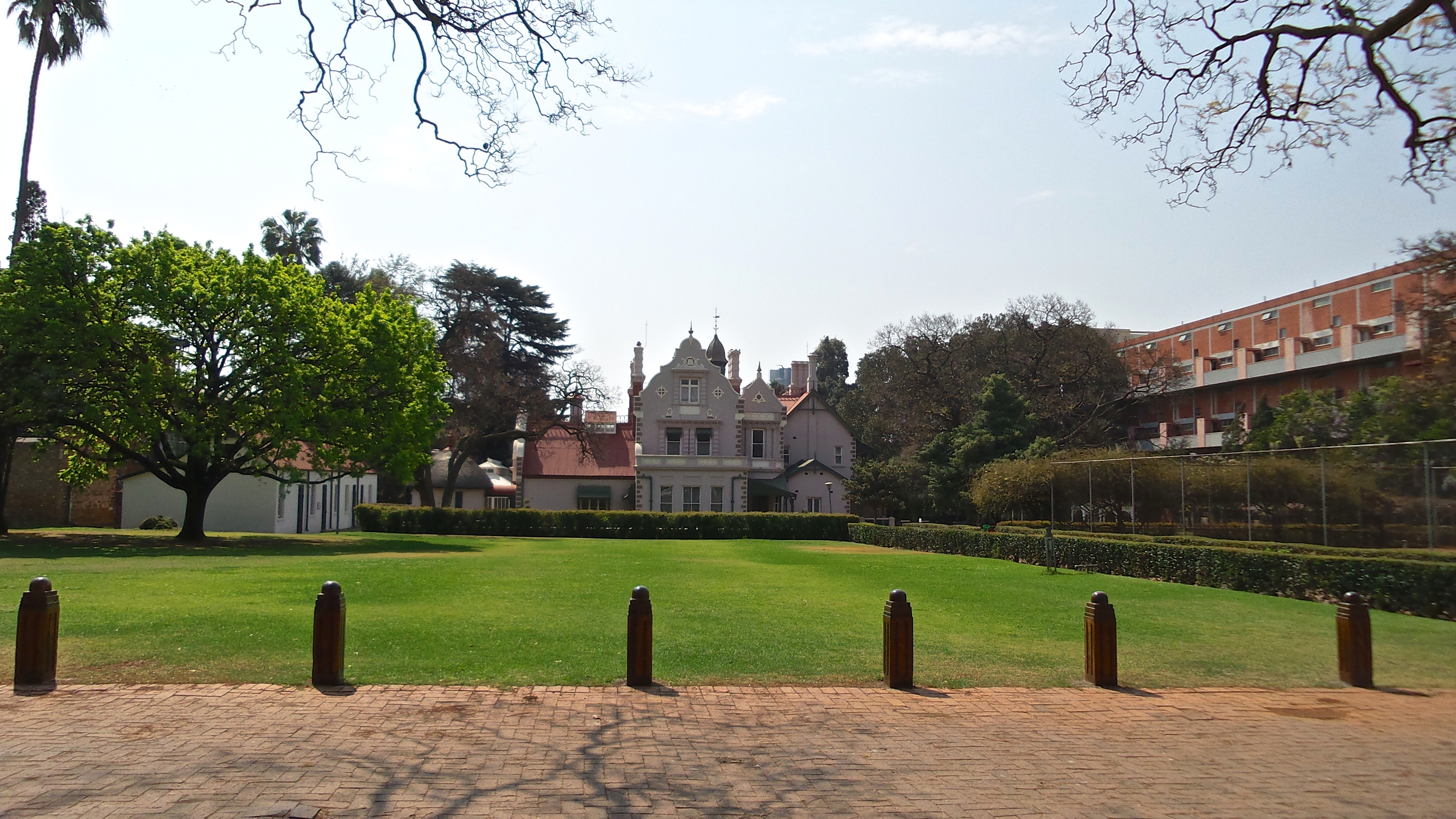

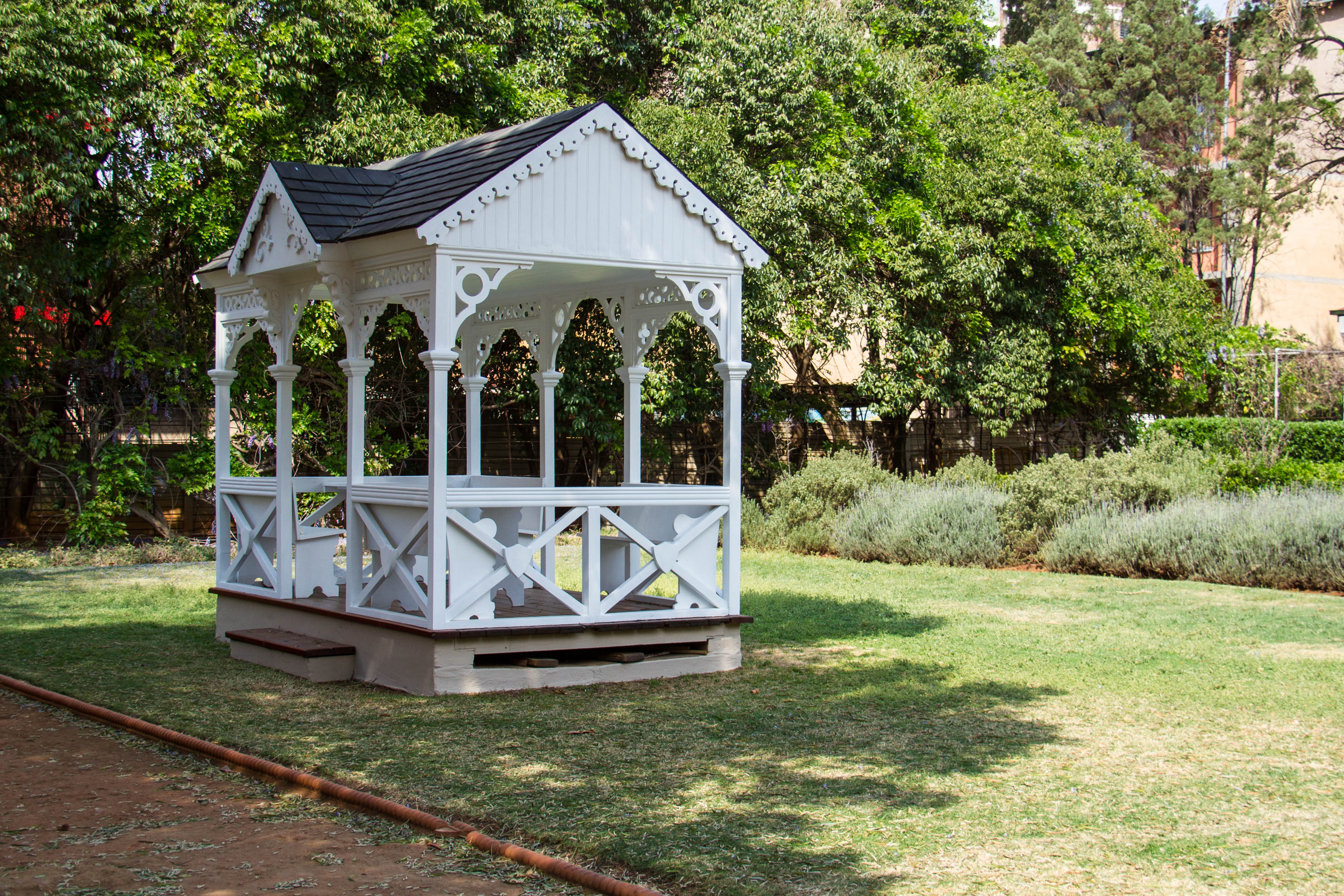

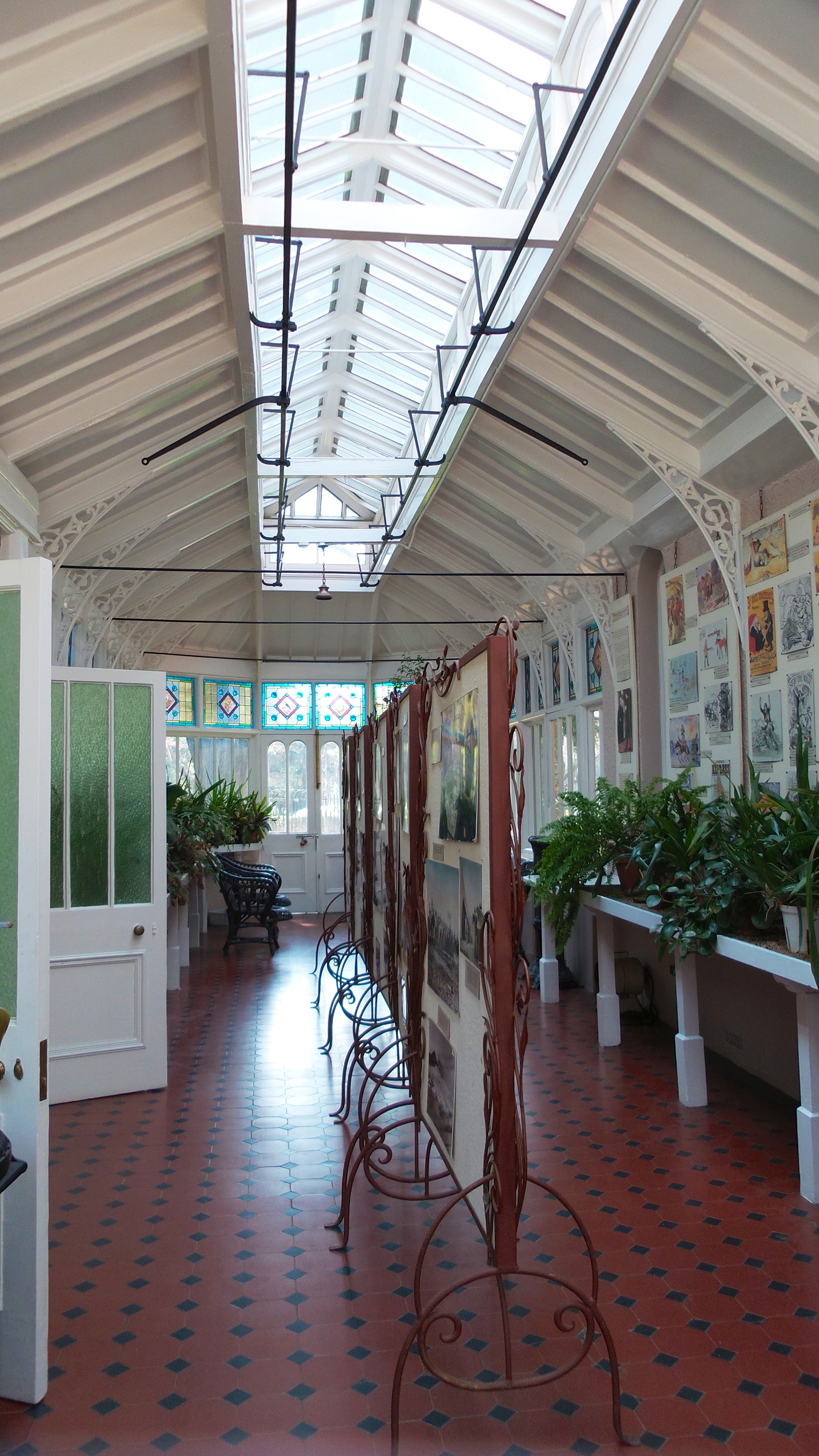
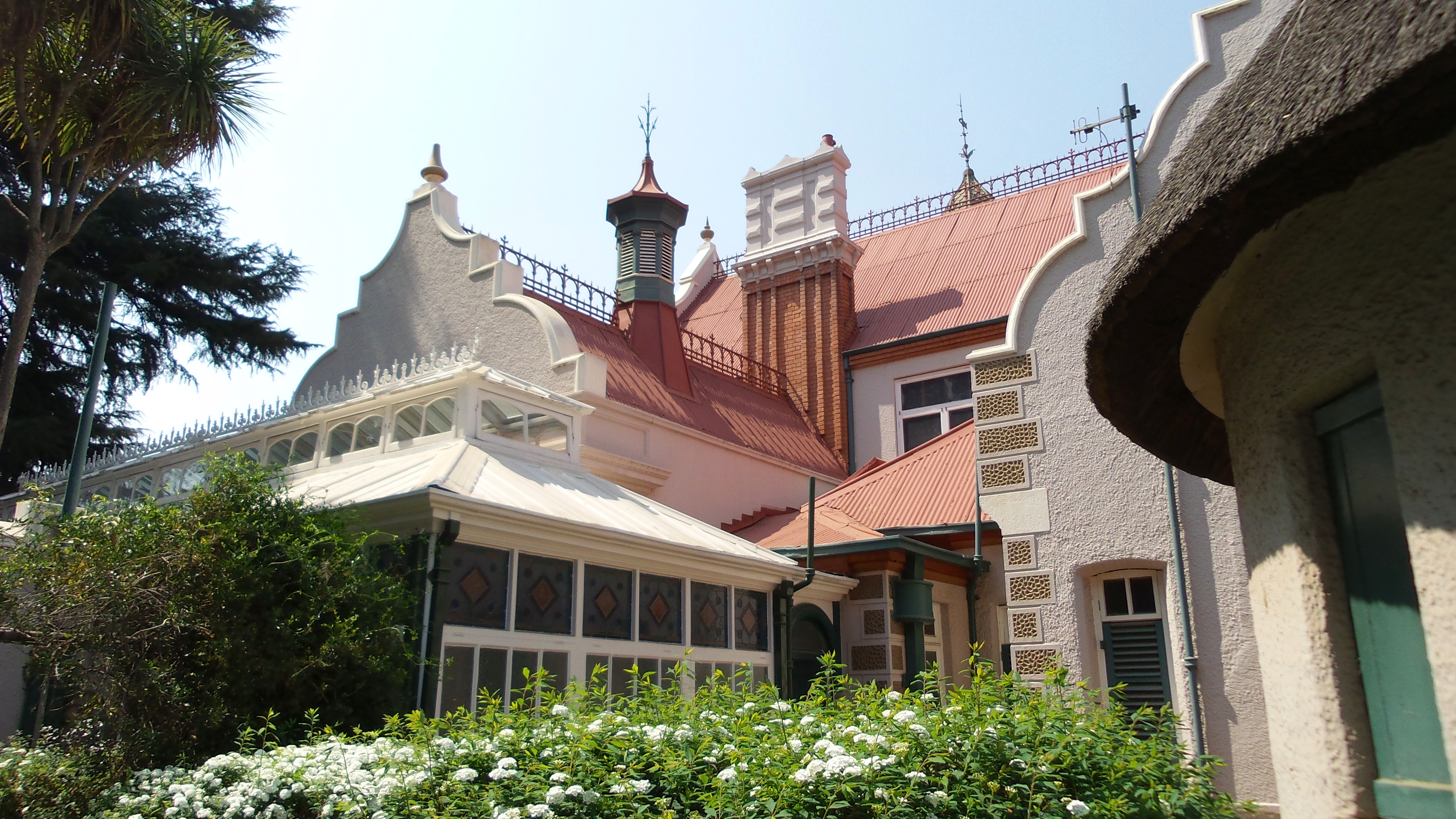

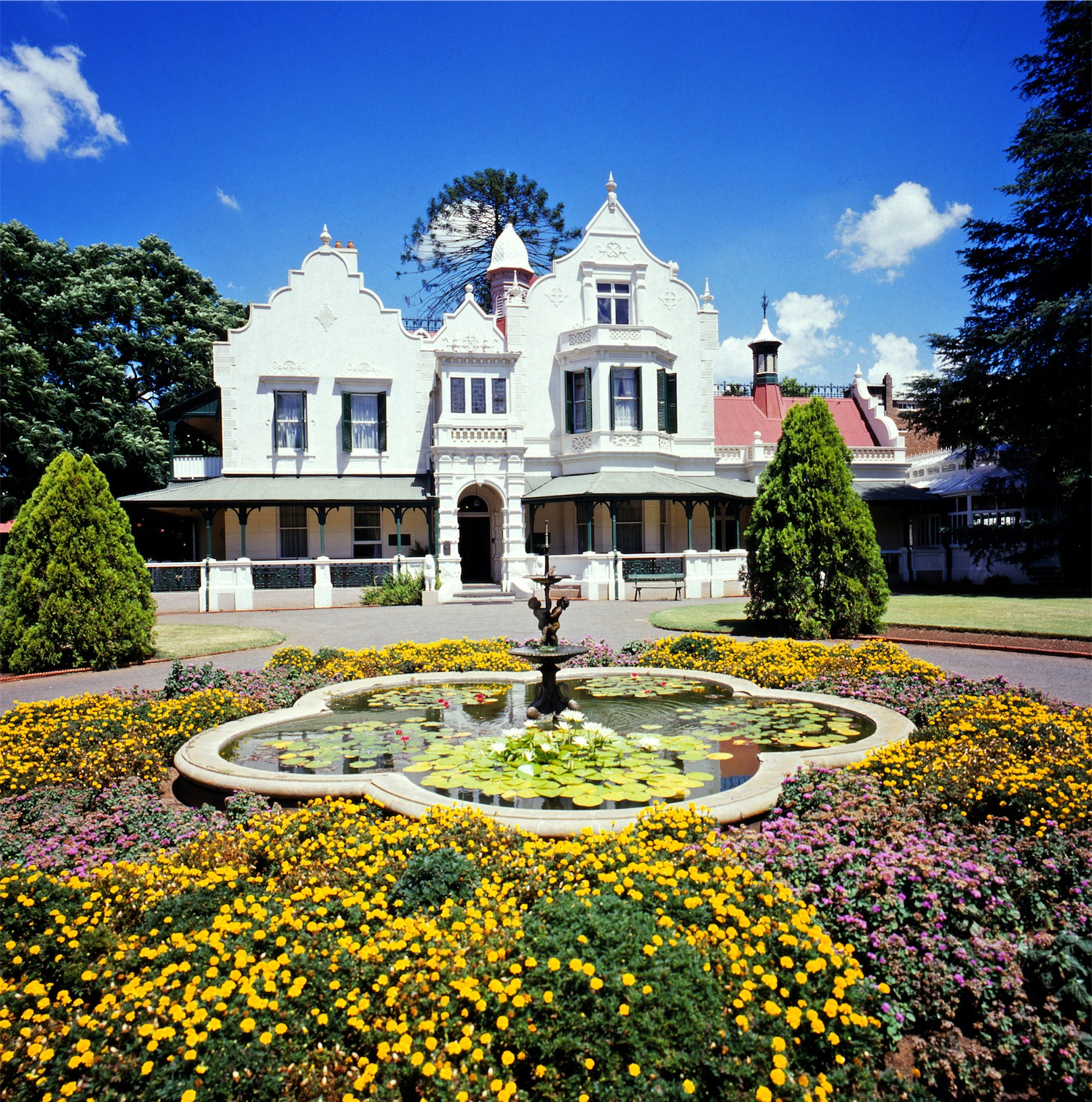

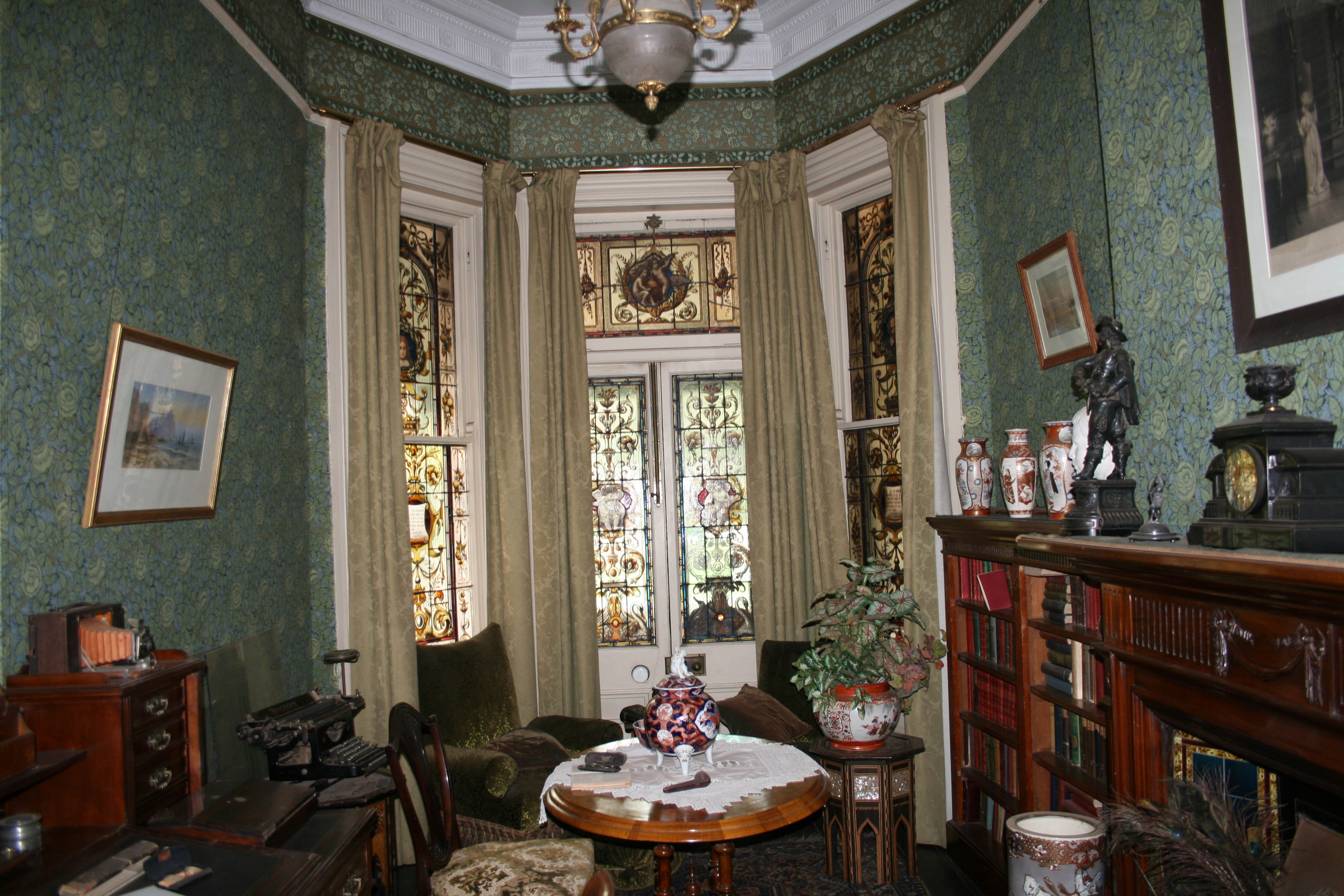

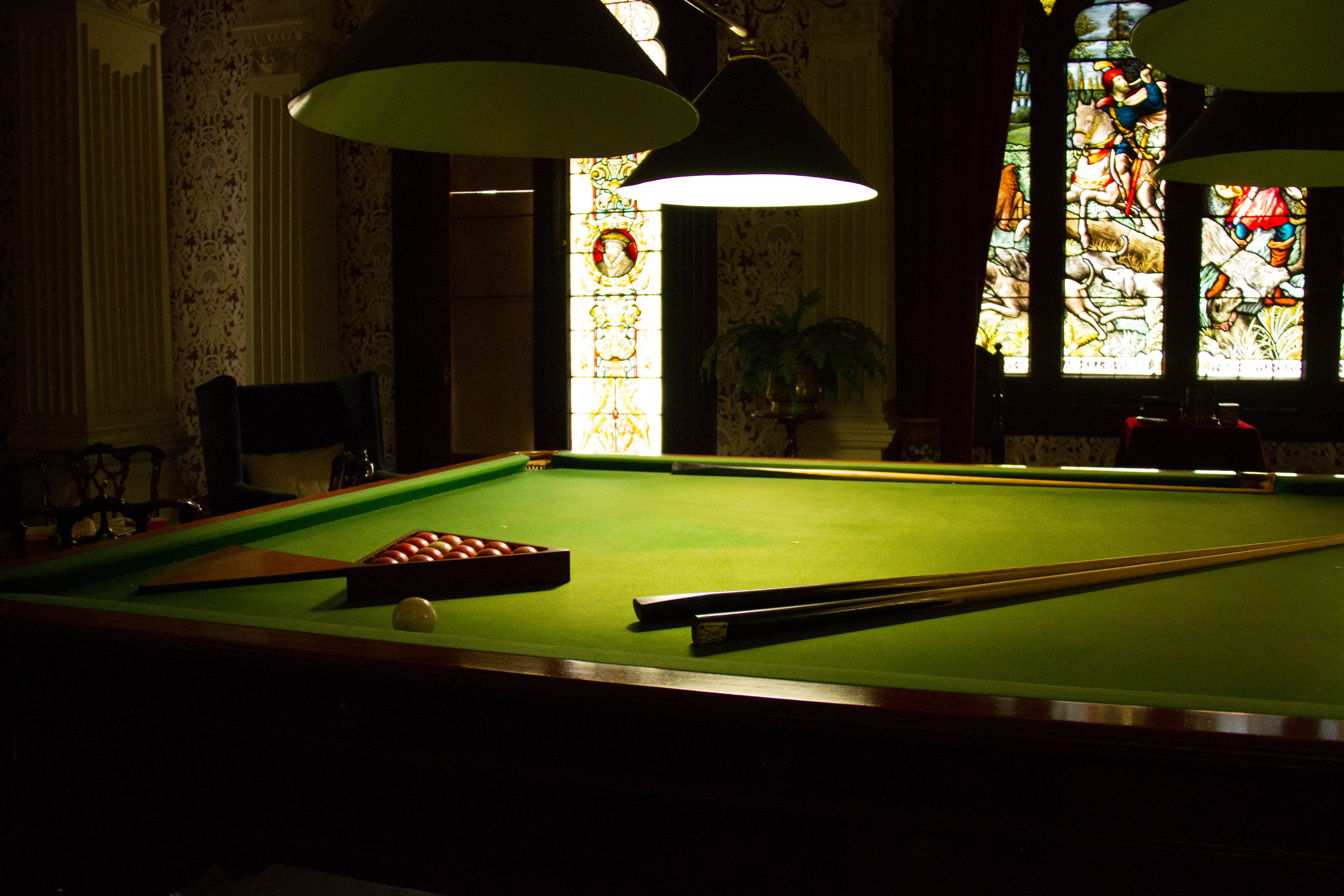

== Bibliography ==
- Wêreldspektrum, 1982, ISBN 0908409591, vol. 18, p. 114
- Fisher, Roger C. (compiler): Visuele leksikon van die Suid-Afrikaanse woning. Cape Town: Unibook Publishers, 1992. ISBN 1-86819-320-9
