= Burgers Park =

Coordinates: 25°45′14″S 28°11′33″E

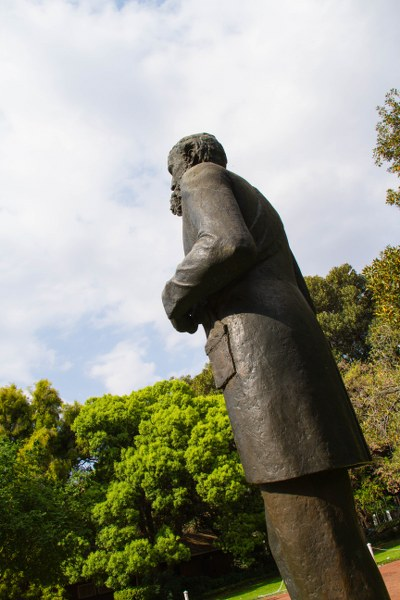
- Statue of Thomas François Burgers in the grounds of the park.
- Interactive map of Burgers Park
- Type: Botanical
- Location: Pretoria, Gauteng
- Area: 4 acres (1.6 ha)
- Opened: 1870s
- Owner: City of Tshwane Metropolitan Municipality

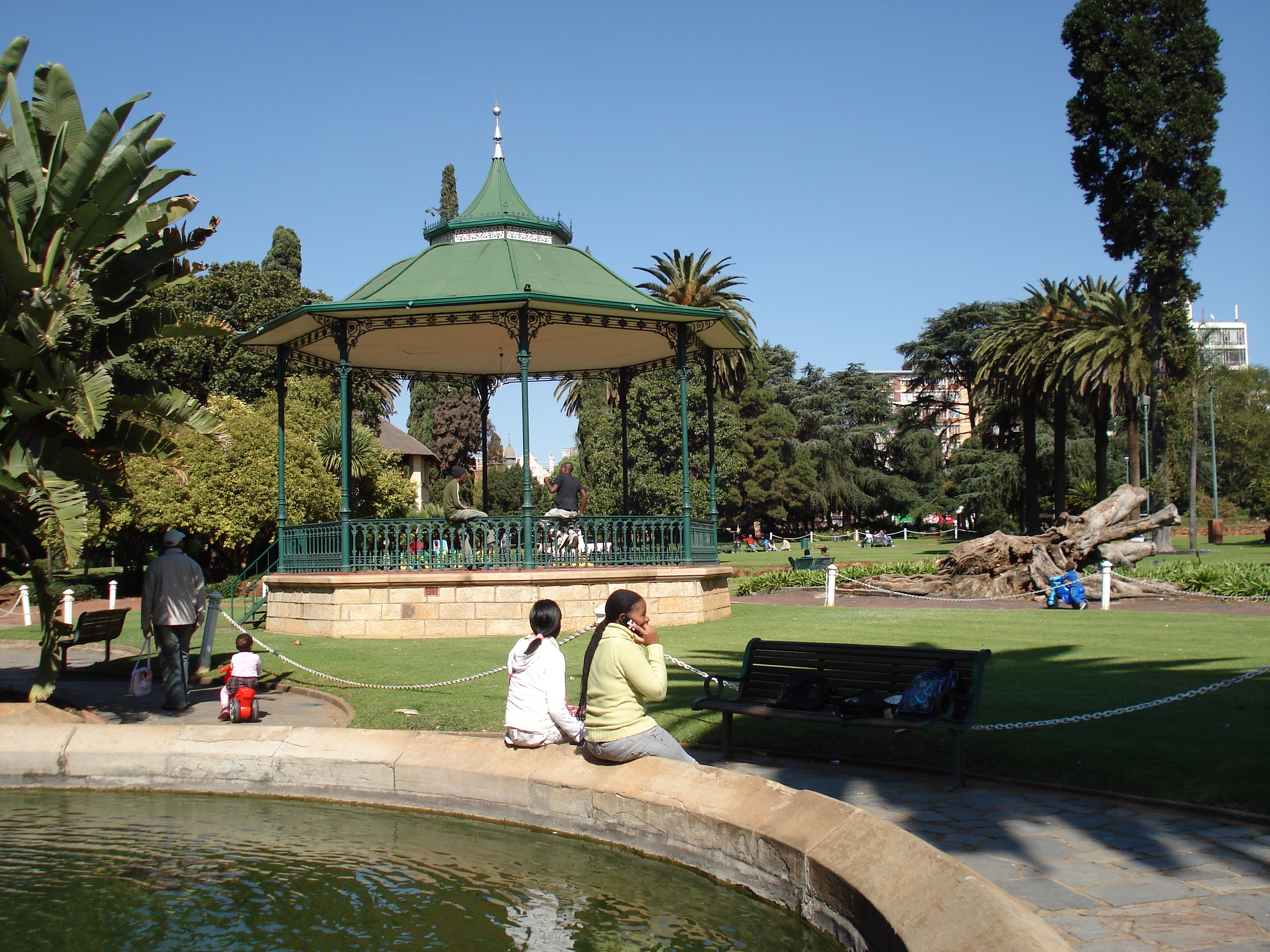

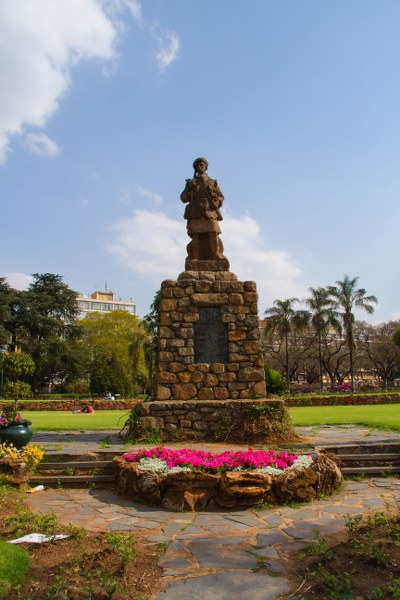
Burgers Park WW2 Memorial

Burgers Park is a park located in the center of Pretoria, South Africa. Founded in the 1870s as a botanical garden, it covers four acres and has been declared a South African National Monument. It is named for Thomas François Burgers, fourth president of the South African Republic. A statue of President Burgers stands in the park. There is also a statue to the South African Scottish Regiment of the Second World War.
