= Statue of Paul Kruger, Church Square =

Bronze sculpture in Pretoria, South Africa

Coordinates: 25°44′47″S 28°11′17″E

Statue of Paul Kruger
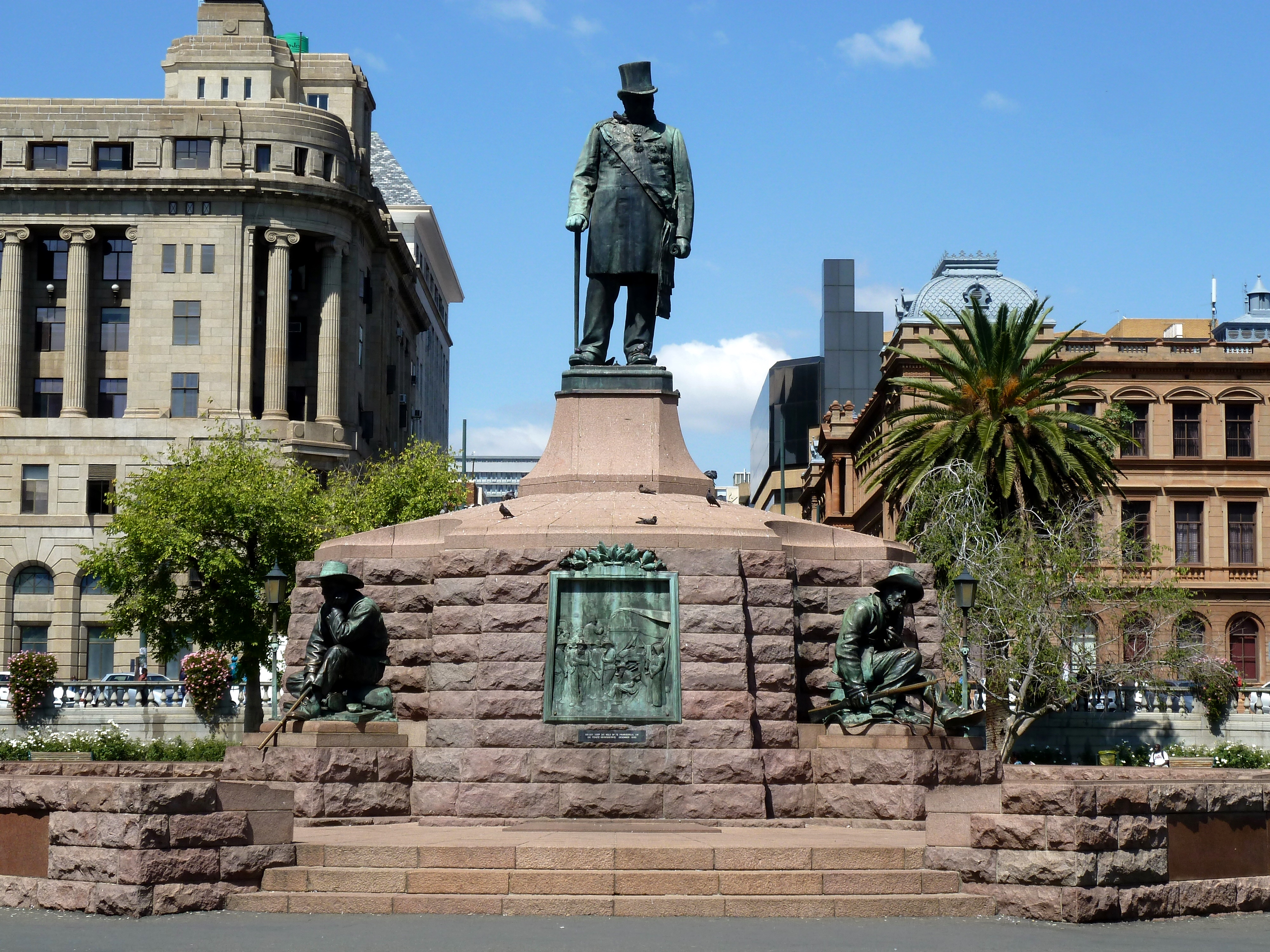
- The statue of Paul Kruger on Church Square in central Pretoria
- Artist: Anton van Wouw
- Year: 1896
- Type: Bronze
- Subject: Paul Kruger
- Location: Church Square, Pretoria, South Africa

The Statue of Paul Kruger (Afrikaans: Krugerstandbeeld) is a bronze sculpture located in Church Square in Pretoria, South Africa. The statue depicts Paul Kruger, the Boer political and military leader and President of the South African Republic from 1883 to 1900, and four unnamed Boer soldiers. The Statue of Paul Kruger was sculpted in 1896 and was installed in its current location in Church Square in 1954.

== History ==
The statue was first sculpted in 1896 by Anton Van Wouw following a commission by Sammy Marks, an industrialist who made his fortune in the South African Republic, who was an enthusiastic supporter of President Paul Kruger. The statue was first installed at Prince's Park and was then moved to a location outside Pretoria railway station. The statue portrays Paul Kruger wearing a top hat and presidential sash with a cane on a plinth. Along with Paul Kruger, the sculpture has four unnamed Boer soldiers at the corners below the main plinth. In 1956, the statue was moved to its current location at Church Square with a new pedestal and was unveiled there by Daniel François Malan.

=== Background ===
In August 1895, the Kruger government was unpopular among the uitlander mining managers and capitalists of Johannesburg. He has been described by some as autocratic, narrow-minded, and ruthless; rumor had it that the "oligarchy" (as the government was called then) would soon be overthrown in Pretoria.

Marks had his chief accountant draft a proposal to the President and Executive Council offering £10,000 to the city of Pretoria to build a marble statue of Kruger at a place of its subject's choice. However, Marks stipulated that "if possible," the statue should be commissioned directly from him, simply requiring whoever was interested to say in whose name and in what bank the money should be deposited. On 5 September Marks got his reply: the Government thanked him "for his rich gift" and informed him that Kruger deemed Burgers Park an ideal site and pledged for any surplus money to be spent to found the Pretoria Zoo. The money was deposited in a dedicated account at the National Bank of the South African Republic in the name of the Treasurer-General.

The Cabinet chiefs and other officials of the Republic debated the finer points of the statue. Dr. Nico Mansvelt, Superintendent of Education and an art expert, considered bronze preferable to marble given the latter's lesser ability to handle the Transvaal climate; Mansvelt also believed the Government should approve the order rather than leaving it up to Marks himself. Marks agreed and soon they settled on Van Wouw, a completely unknown figure in the art world.

=== Van Wouw and his design ===
The Dutchman Van Wouw came to the ZAR as a young man and settled in Pretoria, teaching drawing classes at the state gymnasium and a girls' school after a brief stint as a store clerk. An admirer of Kruger's like Marks, Van Wouw considered the President's tailcoat and top hat an inseparable part of him, something which critics would later lambaste Van Wouw for portraying. To them he replied: "Without them I would not recognize him! With the tailcoat and top hat, I would! "Van Wouw tried to portray the "everyday" Kruger: Kruger on his porch, with citizens at 6:00 in the morning seeking him out not necessarily to discuss politics but perhaps simply to seek advice on healing a sick cow or consolation on a recent loss. For Van Wouw, Kruger was the cornerstone of independence, and the monument should therefore reflect his "everyday" qualities.

His sketch model portrayed Kruger in formal state attire, standing quietly on the pedestal, in what Van Wouw considered a paternal attitude. Two of the four Boers portrayed below his statue were from the Voortrekker time and two were from Van Wouw's epoch, and each surveyed to one of the four cardinal directions. They were meant not to be trained soldiers but typical citizen militias: sedentary but watchful, surrounding Van Wouw's central figure and symbol of Kruger's position as father in the heart of his people and of the Republic's freedom. Marks and members of the Volksraad and Executive Council of the Republic came to view the sketch, which was approved.

On 7 October 1896, more than thirteen months after Marks' initial donation, he and Kruger agreed to have Van Wouw leave for Europe to supervise the work in France and Italy. He remained abroad until 1 April 1898, when he returned to Pretoria. In the meantime, he worked on the monument for £40 a month on a two-year deadline (along with reimbursement for forging and casting expenses). His family was also granted free travel to and from Europe, including work sites there. By December 1896, he was in Europe, first discussing his proposals with the Envoy of the Republic and experts on modeling and casting in the Netherlands. The Envoy, J. G. T. Beelaerts van Blokland, worried that the top hat would cast a shadow over Kruger's face and hide his features, to which Van Wouw held firm, explaining that it would be unthinkable for a Transvaal Boer such as Kruger to stand hat-less under the African sun. The Envoy's only contribution to the final work was a Bible quote on one side of the pedestal, namely Psalm 91:15-16:

He will call on me, and I will answer him; I will be with him in trouble, I will deliver him and honor him. With long life I will satisfy him and show him my salvation.

According to the Envoy, Kruger was partial to the verses, but Kruger was unhappy with praise to him given his belief that such should only go to God, therefore asking to substitute Psalm 105:4-5:

Look to the Lord and his strength; seek his face always. Remember the wonders he has done, his miracles, and the judgments he pronounced.

Due to the circumstances under which the monument was raised, this wish went unfulfilled and no text appeared on the pedestal.

=== The search for inspiration ===
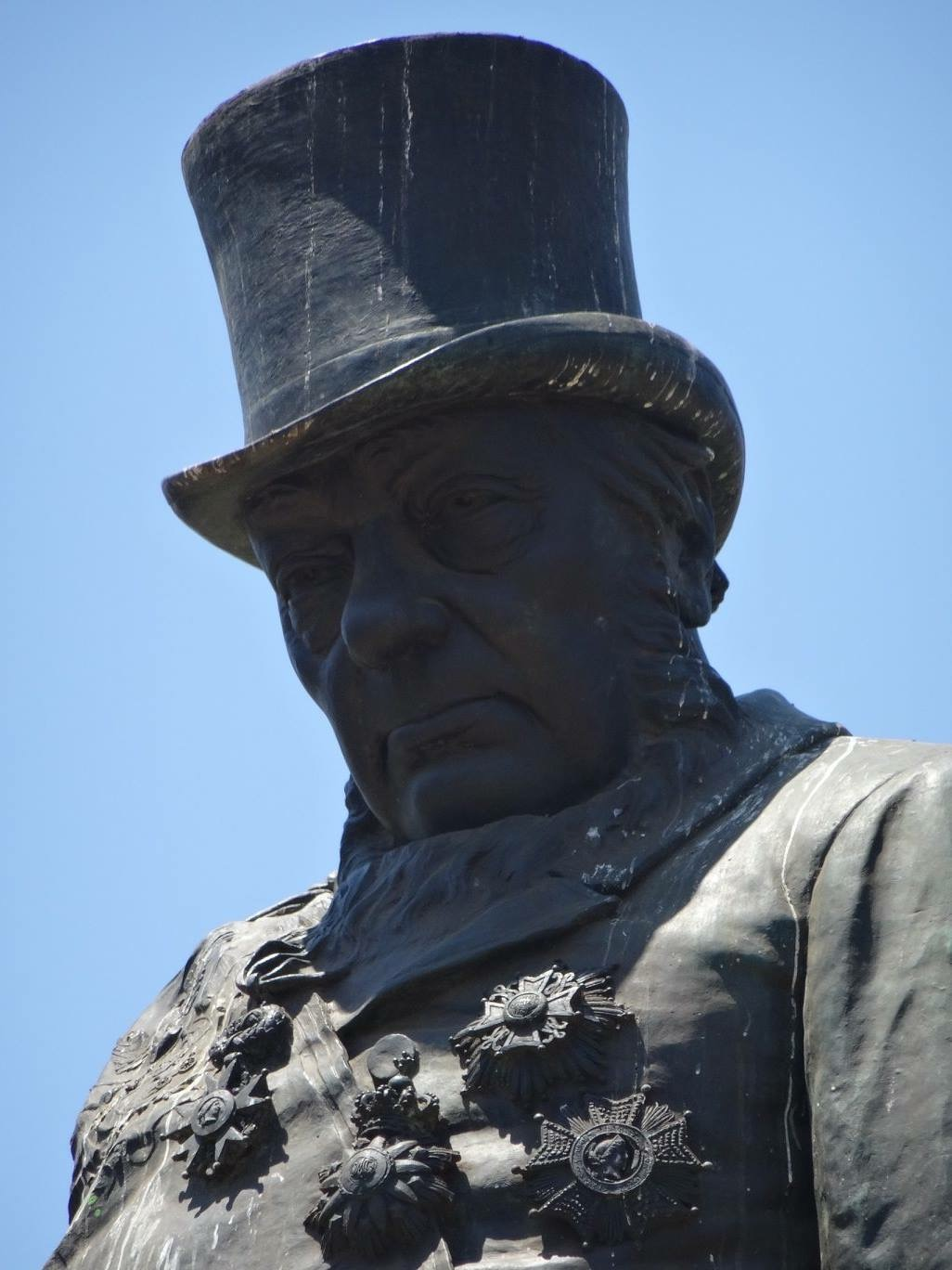
Head of Kruger

When Van Wouw began modeling the Voortrekker figures under fire, he did not know what they looked in full regalia, unlike the familiar Kruger himself and the two modern Boers he simply showed as he had seen them since arrival, namely with a beard, a bandolier, and a Martini–Henry gun. No photos and precious few descriptions survived of old Voortrekker gear, however, so Van Wouw wired Pretoria to send him a full Voortrekker kit, including a powder horn, bandolier, and flintlock. The government struggled to find clothes from the era at the Transvaal Museum but gathered what they needed from citizens of the Rustenburg district who still had pieces.

Another problem arose with the four bronze panels Van Wouw's model had separating the sentries on each side of the pedestal. Each panel was to show an event from Kruger's life, starting with his teenage shepherding beside his father during the Great Trek. Unable to find surviving photos or other information from this time, Van Wouw got permission to instead start with the signing of the 1881 peace accord ending the First Boer War at O'Neill's Cottage in Laing's Nek. At that event, then Vice-president Kruger set the conditions with the British representatives for their withdrawal after a resounding Boer victory at the Battle of Majuba Hill, including securing the independence of the Boers given up by Sir Theophilus Shepstone in 1877. The second bronze panel also posed problems, and Van Wouw considered scrapping it until the State Secretary of the South African Republic persuaded him to keep the scene of the 29-year-old commandant of Rustenburg leaping into the fray among enemy soldiers at the Battle of Makapansgat. Once again, however, no photograph or detailed description was at hand, prompting the Secretary to send an expedition (including an eyewitness of the battle and a photographer) to photograph relevant areas of the cave. The pictures and relevant captions were sent to Van Wouw in Rome with commentary from former commandant Hercules Malan of Rustenburg. A diptych of bronze panels were to depict events related to the First Boer War, since it was Kruger's resistance to annexation then that set the stage for his future statesmanship. One of them showed Kruger delivering the Paardekraal Covenant, an address delivered to thousands near what is now Krugersdorp proclaiming armed resistance on 8 December 1880; this panel was to accompany that depicting the Peace of Laing's Nek. Once again, visual evidence was lacking, with no photos available from the Paardekraal event and only a drawing from The Illustrated London News of the 1881 treaty signing at O'Neill's Cottage that Van Wouw considered a poor depiction of the moment. The Transvaal government once more helped by providing photos of people that would appear in the panels, Boer women in typical finery, and typical gatherings of Boers with ox-wagons such as communion masses. The fourth panel would depict Kruger's first swearing-in ceremony as president in 1883. This was the only panel not to vex Van Wouw, who was in Holland at the time but would later attend the President's third inauguration in Church Square in 1893.

=== The making of the statue ===
Van Wouw set up shop in a studio in Rome shortly after arriving in Europe. Like other sculptors there, he hired artists to model his designs, but was dissatisfied in what he saw as a misunderstanding of the national character of a Transvaal Boer as depicted in the bas-reliefs. Admiring Boer valor in the First Boer War and the Jameson Raid, the Europeans depicted their facial features not as salt-of-the-earth but as possessing the ethereal qualities of a saint or a prophet, leading Van Wouw to opt for completing the work for himself out of frustration. He sought exacting detail, down to a single shoe, thereby taking three and a half months on just one of the Boer sentinels. Under these circumstances as well as that of chronic illness, the original deadline of 1 April 1899 came and went. Van Wouw advocated through State Secretary Willem Johannes Leyds and thereby won a year extension from Marks, whose business partner Isaac Lewis's frequent progress checks betrayed someone "with no real idea of art" who "thought an artwork could be made with the same mentality as a board" in Van Wouw's estimation. The sculptor told Lewis "that I will never compromise Kruger's monument or my good name for any lucre." He wrote to his father shortly afterward:

...they can work high or low, I will continue my work, do my duty, and try to fully convey my impression of the national character of the Transvaal people and their Kruger. After all, it would be ridiculous to sacrifice one's public work for a few months of profit. It would be worse if the work was a failure, but I am working that it may not be one. You or someone else must speak to Lord Marks about it, however, as I am right now facing this alone.

By May 1898, Van Wouw had finished three of the five planned plaster-cast models: the one of Kruger, standing 4.5 m (14 ft 9 in), and the two modern Boer sentinels, each 2.22 m (7 ft 3 1/2 in) high. Kruger's right hand was shown on his cane and his left a rolled-up document, while he appeared to face down and to the left at a crowd at his feet; he starkly contrasts the tense Boers, one with a thick beard, head up, and his finger on the trigger of his Martini-Henry, the other with a thinner beard raising his shoulder to hoist a full bandolier. Van Wouw now needed to find a professional to cast them in bronze. He had queried the best casters in Holland shortly after arriving in Europe and settled on Royal Dutch Gold and Silver Workshop or J.M. van Kempen and Sons, who could not handle statues of this size, sending him on to Rome. On 21 May 1898, after six months there, he contracted with Franciscus Bruno to complete the entire work "in line with fashion and all rules of perfect art," the latter craftsman agreeing to cast in bronze all models completed in the next five months by 21 January 1899, as well as any finished in the five months after within three months of delivery. Also responsible for safe transport from Van Wouw's workshop to Bruno's forge and suitable packaging for shipping to South Africa, Bruno would be guaranteed 39,500 lire (at the time around £2,360), a quarter for delivering the Kruger figure itself, a quarter for that of two modern Boers, and the rest for completion and packaging of all castings. Van Wouw would be able to inspect the work at the foundry at any time.

Bruno had agreed with Van Wouw on using a 92% copper, 8% tin mixture for the bronze, while Van Wouw worked on the Voortrekkers and the bas-reliefs. He had eight months to plaster-cast the Voortrekkers: one with his left elbow on his knee, his chin folded in his hands, and a gun's muzzle on the ground with its butt-stock on his right leg; the other with a long beard and a few wrinkles on his forehead, seated upright with his gun in both hands. The modeling work was done in 1899, along with the casting for three of the five pieces, allowing Van Wouw to pivot to the panels - one of which had already been finished by the end of 1898. It is unknown how long the remaining three took: from his letters, Van Wouw appears to have finished all of them, including decorative ornaments (such as a large "K" monogram) by June 1899. Overseeing the rest of the casting, he returned to Pretoria in September–October of that year, where he would oversee the erection of the statue and fulfill the second portion of his contract with Marks.

=== Shattered dreams ===
Van Wouw arrived in Pretoria to find a pedestal on Church Square, halfway between the Ou Raadsaal and the new Palace of Justice and just west of the church in the middle of the square. Correspondence from the Gauteng office of the National Archives and Records Service of South Africa show an agreement between Van Wouw and Marks that the latter would choose the best of several exemplars of Scottish granite for material, but given Marks' supervision of the pedestal carving, it is not clear how much input Van Wouw had. Marks also preferred to substitute Kruger's intended Burgers Park with a more accessible location, "in the center of the city" where every visitor would see it, ideally "just west of the church building on the church square and right between the House of Parliament and the Supreme Court." The Executive Council (of which Kruger was chair) debated siting for five months and concurred with Marks on 2 June 1899. In the meantime, Marks had hired an architect, W. J. de Zwaan, to build a pedestal; once the plans were approved, he had a Scottish firm secure and sand the appropriate granite slabs. Sytze Wierda, head of the ZAR Department of Public Works: to him a Transvaal President's statue belonged on Transvaal granite, and only the machinery needed to be imported. He was overruled, however, and Marks had 200 tons of red, smooth-polished Aberdeen granite ready in July 1899 to house the statue.

Van Wouw was eager to put up the statue, but Kruger said it had to wait until the war was over, and so it would never be raised in the ZAR. On 11 October 1899, shortly before the cast models and panels were due to arrive in South Africa, the Second Boer War broke out. While they were gradually imported, they could not go past Delagoa Bay, since they were not priority items. Marks had to pay a king's ransom to salvage them and felt it was not worth the cost, losing interest when he realized the Boers would lose the war after the British took Pretoria. Marks spent the war on his farm, Zwartkoppies, as a passive spectator, but did receive a visit from Lord Kitchener. Kitchener, on Marks showing him Van Wouw's photographs of the statues, asked Marks to keep them as souvenirs of the people he conquered; Marks replied: "They are in Delagoa Bay and cost an arm and a leg, take them off my hands!" Kitchener sent the sculptures off on the first ship home with two exceptions: a chest containing the Kruger sculpture and a wooden model of a gun, of no interest to Kitchener, which stayed in the sheds of the African Boating Company in Lourenço Marques. Kitchener hoisted the sentinel statues on either side of the driveways leading into the Woolwich and Sandhurst Royal Military Academies, moving them after complaints to a pedestal in front of the Royal School of Military Engineering in Chatham near the Boer War Memorial Arch. Placing them under the care of the Royal Engineers, he later gifted two of them to that branch of the military and took the other two to his estate at Broome Park in Kent.

Kitchener was determined that the remaining Kruger statue never be raised on African soil, considering him the personification of what the British called "Krugerism." The Pretoria City Council thus received a brief in the name of the Lieutenant Governor of the Transvaal Colony stipulating that the pedestal be removed from its central location and that the council say where they were moving it, be it Burgers Park or elsewhere. The Council decided on Prince's Park and so there the pedestal was erected. This provoked bitter Afrikaner protest, led by Gen. Louis Botha and his Het Volk party, who complained to the Lieutenant-Governor and told the council that "we are deeply disappointed...and...this can be considered nothing but an insult to our people." He vowed that "We know that there are many today who are eager to see our people's traditions dragged through the mud, but we would never have expected such behavior from the City Council of Pretoria, least of all given that so many of you not only knew him but were among his closest friends in the capital." Kitchener eventually transferred Church Square (previously Transvaal federal territory) to the council with the express condition "that no buildings, statues or memorials of any description be erected on, or other improvements effected to the ground, without the sanction of the Lieutenant-Governor being first obtained".

=== The statue's return from exile ===
As the Treaty of Vereeniging granted generous terms to the Boers (due to their continued resistance to the British in the final years of the Boer War), Afrikaners were able to elect their own government in 1906, just four years after the end of the conflict. Kruger died in 1904, and the Transvaal Colony elected Botha, Commandant-General of Boer forces in the War and then leader of the Het Volk, as its Prime Minister, a post in which he would continue from 1910 on for South Africa at large. Botha petitioned Kitchener to return the four sentinels and the panels to South Africa to accompany the statue in Church Square, but Kitchener claimed he could not return those in his possession, claiming they were not spoils of war but a personal gift from Marks. The Pretoria City Council turned to Marks, Van Wouw, and finally Kitchener, but none of them could find the missing statue.

After two years of research, the city council once again asked Marks if he could release the Kruger statue, still stored in Lourenço Marques, for construction; Marks insisted he would only do so when the council agreed to complete the entire monument according to his initial design. The city council decided to simply recast the missing Boers and panels on the advice of Fanie Eloff, who said it could be done for a mere £380, but while they appropriated £500 for Van Wouw's missing material, they found the plaster casts and sketches unavailable. This left taking bronze casts of the British originals to reforge as the only remaining option, one beyond the means of the council at an estimated cost of at least £1,760. Once again reaching out to Marks, the Council finally won his agreement to put Kruger up on the pedestal in Prince's Park.

On 24 May 1913, Victoria Day, Gen. Schalk Willem Burger, President while Kruger was in Europe from 1900 to 1902, unveiled the statue to the public. Both former Orange Free State President Martinus Theunis Steyn and Botha were absent, the former due to illness and the latter to attend to urgent parliamentary matters. The unveiling coincided with an agriculture fair and was attended by 3,000 citizens. At the ceremony, Burger expressed it hope that the statue would one day take its "rightful place" in Church Square, and Andries Daniël Wynand Wolmarans proclaimed that: "I sincerely wish, from my heart and for my people, that this statue be moved to Church Square, to the center of the city, so it can take the place it deserves. There should also be an effort to bring back the missing pieces to South Africa, for one can only understand what Kruger means to his people when he is surrounded by sturdy Boers." Botha contacted Kitchener once more to return the four other figures, to which he agreed to "willingly" return the two he owned "to meet the wish of the people of South Africa," but only in return for copies; the two owned by the Royal Engineers were not his to return, but the Union of South Africa government was free to produce replicas of them at its own expense.

Botha was willing to accept this arrangement, but at a cost of £520 per statue for a total of £2,080, he let the issue go. In 1917, Botha had to visit London briefly and was asked by the mayor to try and secure the statues again, but Botha explained that he had been negotiating for four years in vain with Kitchener (who had died the previous year) and did not wish to continue doing so. The council once again sought Marks' help to no avail. In August 1920, Edward P. Mathers, editor of the newspaper South Africa, began a press campaign to return the statue with the help of former President Francis William Reitz. Mathers discovered where the missing sculptures were, published the photos in his paper, and asked the Mayor of Chatham, Kent, to pressure his borough council to help return the two figures there to South Africa, given that "as they remain at present they are a menace to the good relationships which I am sure Chatham as all England wishes to be established and preserved between them and the Dutch of South Africa." Mathers also pointed out that South Africa and England had fought on the same side in World War I and that "spoils of conquest" from Afrikaners should be replaced with "trophies of our enemies" there. The Mayor of Chatham replied that the statues belonged not to the council but to the Royal Engineers, who in turn said returning the artwork required the consent of the full membership. The officer corps there said that even though South Africa would volunteer to complete the task, they were unwilling to part with a memento of the "brave and honourable men" whom they fought against in 1899-1902 and fought alongside in 1914–1918; they also treasured the donation from the late Lord Kitchener, whom they held "in special regard and honour." Therefore, copies made at South Africa's expense were all the nation would get.

While the public campaign to return the statue failed, Gen. Jan Smuts also put in his efforts. Succeeding Botha after the latter's death in 1919 as Prime Minister of the Union, Smuts was popular in Britain for his contributions to the war effort and the Paris Peace Conference. Smuts enlisted Lord Milner in November 1920, appealing to the latter's desire to mend his unpopularity post-Boer-War with a gesture of gratitude to the Afrikaners' newly proven loyalty. Milner contacted the Prime Minister of the United Kingdom. David Lloyd George, the King, and the executors of the Kitchener estate. On 18 January 1921, Smuts received a telegram from Milner "that His Majesty, the "Colonel-in-Chief" of the Royal Engineers, has agreed to donate the two Boer figures and the panels in Chatham as a gift to the Government of the Union of South Africa, and that Lord Kitchener's executors and His Majesty's Government will also provide the South African Government with the two other figures currently in Broome Park." The Union had to pay any transport costs, as already agreed to. On 23 August 1921, the complete monument came off the ship in Cape Town, and on 12 September of that year, it arrived at last in Pretoria. All that was missing was the monogram "K," which was lost and never returned.

=== The last struggle: 1925–1954 ===
Assuming the monument would never be built, the Pretoria City Council authorized a World War I memorial on Church Square, but then Mayor of Pretoria George Brink responded to an 13 August 1920 protest from Mrs. H. Jooste (of the National Party Women's Auxiliary) by declaring that there would be no monument whatsoever there. The memorial would be put in front of the Union Buildings and the Kruger statue on the square in front of the Pretoria railway station, on the same pedestal that once sat on Church Square and in Prince's Park. Prime Minister J. B. M. Hertzog unveiled the statue on 10 October 1925, the centennial of Kruger's birth, while surrounded by the flags of the Orange Free State and ZAR in front of a crowd of 25,000. The ceremony was attended by, among others, the Governor-General the Earl of Athlone and his spouse, as well as the entire Cabinet. Hertzog gave the keynote address, but Gen. Smuts and Wolmarans both spoke as well. While Hertzog and Smuts concentrated on the subject's character and deeds, Wolmarans once more emphasized that Station Square could not hold a candle to Church Square, "the heart of Kruger City," as a suitable place for the statue.

Over the years, organizations such as the Federasie van Afrikaanse Kultuurvereniginge, the S.A. Vrouefederasie (South African Women's Federation]] and the Pretoria Cultural Council petitioned the City Council to move the statue to Church Square. In fact, the Kruger Committee met with over 20,000 members in October 1936 to pressure the mayor, but the council was unmoved. The Cultural Council's Kruger Committee, chiefly tasked with holding the annual Kruger Festival, spun off on its own as the Kruger Society (Afrikaans: Krugergenootskap) with just such a relocation as the ultimate goal. Enlisting the help of other Afrikaner cultural organizations, the society used the centennial reenactment of the Great Trek in 1838 to kick off another advocacy campaign. The city council fielded thousands of letters from various individuals and organizations, including branches of the Transvaal Education Association, the Organizing Committee of the Paardekraal Voortrekker Centennial Festival, the Carriage Reception Committee, and others; even Anglo groups such as the Sons of England, the New Guard, and the Hatfield Ratepayers Association joined the effort. The city council stalled, hoping interest would flag, but on 9 March 1939, the Transvaal Provincial Council unanimously motioned for the city council to solve the matter definitively, and on 29 May, the majority of the latter agreed to relocate the statue at no cost to them.

The chairman of the Kruger Society and the mayor of Pretoria made a joint appeal for citizen donations, earning £4,000 for the relocation. In consultation with Van Wouw, who had never preferred Marks's choice of pedestal, Kruger Society architect J. M. van der Westhuizen planned a new base for the monument. Van Wouw's approval was followed by that of the full society, which proceeded to arrange for an unveiling on Church Square on 10 October 1941, by Mrs. Rachel Isabella Steyn, widow of the last president of the Orange Free State. At this point, the city council declared the new pedestal architecturally out of step with Church Square, a matter probed by two architects (Gordon Leith and Vivian Sydney Rees-Poole) and their colleagues from the Kruger Society. It turned out that the council preferred the southern entrance of the square as a location for the statue, while the society favored the center. Van Wouw took the Kruger Society's position in two firm letters stating:

It is my vision for the pedestal, the Boers, and the President's likeness to coexist as one unit, according to architect's plans in consultation with myself, on Church Square where the fountain and fishpond are currently. As a sculptor, I refuse to have the statue I love and care for so much be placed anywhere where its greatness would fall to the wayside. The center of Church Square is the designated place and there it must be built.

In his other letter, Van Wouw claimed that Kruger himself had personally told the artist in the presence of several Volksraad members that it belonged at that location.

Van Wouw's letter came to naught, and the issue was dropped until Gerard Moerdijk, architect of the Voortrekker Monument, suggested placing the statue near the southern entrance to Church Square as the "psychological center" to what he envisioned as a kind of amphitheater, as the pulpit of a church would be. An honorary stele and bell tower would be built behind the statue, with the Boer figures on the sides rather than around the base of the Kruger statue. The Kruger Society approved the plan, while the city council suggested an open national competition to gather architect's designs unifying the plaza around the statue, and asked for the Pretoria Institute for Architecture (PIA) and the Kruger Society's cooperation. Both organizations agreed, the latter on the condition that a majority of the judges would have the final say on the chosen design, but the PIA by-laws prohibited its members from participating in outside competitions.

At this point a new development emerged: Professor William Holford, Baron Holford proposed a plan to city council for the overall development of the capital, including the Kruger statue in Church Square. The impressed council scrapped all previous plans on 28 September 1950, enlisting the Kruger Society to raise the statue on the Square under the conditions of strict adherence to the Holford's plan and council approval of the final product. The cost and time requirements were quite unpopular, and oral agreements were not forthcoming: the Old Pretoria Society voiced its displeasure openly, and even the Kruger Society eventually rejected it.

On 12 June 1951, the Kruger Society decided to abandon Moerdijk's idea of placing the Kruger statue at the southern entrance of Church Square and return to advocating the central location, to which the statue was to be moved by 10 October 1954 (Kruger's birthday), or on 16 December 1954 (the 50th anniversary of Kruger's burial in the Pretoria Old Cemetery on Church Street. Since Kruger dreamed of free passage to the east coast, the society also decided the statue should face eastward from Church Square. Any changes City Council wanted to make could be introduced later, though the central position would stay. After the Council heard from a delegation of the society, the former decided on 20 December 1951 to cancel their previous decisions and unanimously embrace the society's position, on the condition of the council incurring no costs and having final approval rights. Permission was granted to the society on 26 November 1952, once approval was gained from the Administrator of Transvaal Province, to begin the relocation. The council was still bound to Kitchener's prohibition of statues without the Lieutenant-Governor's approval, however, but the society got the federal Cabinet to approve the plans by minutes no. 298 on 9 February 1953, getting the administrator's approval in the meantime.

Donations were once again sought, with an estimated £20,000 needed, but construction began during fundraising, fostered by Governor-General of South Africa Ernest George Jansen, Prime Minister D. F. Malan, all Provincial Administrators (including that of South West Africa), and all their spouses. Both Anglo and Afrikaner individuals, schools, churches, municipalities, businesses, cultural organizations, and other groups pitched in. On 10 October 1953, Malan laid the cornerstone of a new pedestal in front of a crowd of around 15,000, and Dutch Prime Minister Willem Drees attended and addressed the crowd. The Kruger statue was moved from Pretoria Station on 25 June 1954 and placed on 28 June on the pedestal facing north as the society had recently decided. One year after the cornerstone was laid, on 10 October 1954, Malan unveiled the monument, complete with the four sentinels.

== Controversy ==
Following the end of apartheid in South Africa, there had been calls for the removal of the statue from its location due to it being viewed as an "icon of apartheid" by some African National Congress activists.

In 2015, following the Rhodes Must Fall campaign in Cape Town, the statue of Paul Kruger was vandalized when green paint was thrown on it. The Economic Freedom Fighters (EFF) initially claimed responsibility but later retracted this when the City of Tshwane stated its intent to open a criminal case of malicious damage against the perpetrators. Following the vandalism and a pledge by the EFF to destroy the statue, numerous people voiced support for the statue. Singer Sunette Bridges chained herself to the statue to prevent further damage, with Afrikaners in military uniforms starting to guard the statue. A rally also took place next to the statue requesting it to be left alone as part of South Africa's cultural history. This ended with Steve Hofmeyr singing the former national anthem of South Africa, "Die Stem van Suid-Afrika". The statue has subsequently been ringed by 1.5 m high fencing and is not directly accessible to the public.

In 2023, the statue was vandalized when a cast iron memorial plaque was removed. The plaque was later recovered.

On 19 September 2025 the statue was mentioned in the South African parliament in a motion introduced by the EFF Chief Whip, Nontando Nolutshungu, on behalf of party leader Julius Malema, about the removal of colonial and apartheid-era statues and monuments.

The statue was vandalized on the night of 25 September 2025 when the four unnamed soldiers were damaged.

== Sources ==
- Breytenbach, J. H. (1954). Die Geskiedenis van die Krugerstandbeeld. Pretoria: Die Krugergenootskap.
