= Silverton Siege =

2022 South African film directed by Mandla Dube

- Directed by: Mandla Dube
- Produced by: Walter Ayres; Mandla Dube
- Starring: Thabo Rametsi; Arnold Vosloo; Noxolo Dlamini; Stefan Erasmus; Elani Dekker; Shane Wellington; Michelle Mosalakae; Deon Coetzee
- Cinematography: Shaun Harley Lee
- Music by: Rashid Lanie
- Production company: Pambili Media
- Distributed by: Netflix
- Release date: 27 April 2022
- Running time: 100 minutes
- Country: South Africa
- Languages: English; Afrikaans; Zulu

Silverton Siege is a South African film directed by Mandla Dube. It is based on the real life siege that took place in Silverton, Pretoria in 1980. The film was released internationally on Netflix on 27 April 2022.

== Plot ==
Calvin Khumalo, Terra Mabunda and Aldo Erasmus are anti-apartheid freedom fighters in MK, whose planned petrol depot sabotage outside the Pretoria suburb Silverton is thwarted because the local police, led by Captain Langerman, has been tipped off.

Forced to abort the mission, they flee towards Pretoria. When Terra's partner Masego and their van's tires are shot, they end up fleeing on foot, eventually through the sewage tunnels. They resurface through a manhole near Church Square, in the heart of Pretoria. Spotted by the police, they flee into Volkskas Bank there.

Calvin addresses the bank clients and employees, explaining that they are not robbing it and asking that they cooperate calmly so no one gets hurt. The bank supervisor Christine seems to be both helpful and sympathetic.

The police surrounds the bank and when the three hear Langerman address them all by their names, this enforces their suspicion of a mole in their organisation. They request a helicopter with an unarmed black pilot and say that they will take an American hostage along. However, as the American bank customer is black, they decide to take a white Boer instead, as they realise that the police will expect a white American.

Realising it all seems too easy, Aldo hesitates when they reach the helicopter. The pilot then pulls out a concealed gun but gets disarmed, and everyone returns to the bank. Finding a hidden microphone under the pilot's clothes, Calvin sees that he also has a black-white supremacist tattoo.

Outside the bank, police reinforcements arrives, headed by a brigadier whom Langerman disdainfully nicknames "Little Crocodile" (South Africa's prime minister at the time, P.W. Botha, was known as "Big Crocodile"). The brigadier announces that he has been ordered to take over operational command, because the bank supervisor Christine is the justice minister's daughter.

Realising that this is likely their last chance to make an impact, Calvin decides to start a movement. He demands that Nelson Mandela is to be officially pardoned and released. To emphasise their demand, they also force the American hostage to set ablaze a huge pile of the money outside the bank in front of the TV cameras, while Calvin starts the chant 'free Nelson Mandela', which is soon picked up by the blacks in the crowd outside.

Aldo accompanies the pilot to the toilets, where the pilot threatens to expose him as the mole. Aldo stabs him to death, then whacks his own head on a sink to make it look like self-defence. Calvin finds them on the floor, and he and Aldo then hide the pilot's body so his death won't be detected.

When Calvin calls Langerman and asks for food and water for the hostages, Langerman agrees, on condition that two hostages are released, and he asks for Christine to be one of them. Calvin selects a heavily pregnant woman and Christine, saying that the police had specifically asked for her. However, Christine refuses and asks one of her bank tellers to go instead.

Soon afterwards, the racist Boer Johan pulls out a hidden revolver, holds Aldo at gunpoint and demands that the other two lay down their guns. When they do, he starts shooting at all three and a bullet grazes Terra's left arm. Once Johan has emptied his revolver, Calvin cuffs him while reminding his two comrades that they mustn't kill any civilians. Christine bandages Terra's wound and tells Calvin she did not leave when she could because she wants to help.

A mulatto woman, who previously showed disdain for black customers and the armed fighters, disappears into the back of the bank, trying to find an exit. Having discovered the pilot's body, she confronts Calvin, who explains that it happened in self-defence. They then talk about race. Calvin accuses her of trying to pass for white and she talks about all the difficulties she has had. They eventually return to the group.

After they have burned more money outside the bank, this time together with a willing white priest among the hostages, Langerman hands Calvin a letter said to be from South Africa's prime minister and containing a pardon for Mandela. In exchange he asks to visit the hostages. Seeing Christine among them, Langerman urges her to leave, but she again refuses. When he tells Terra that his name is Langerman, she shoots Aldo dead, because Aldo had mentioned him by that name before none of them knew it, so she realised that he was the mole.

Both mourn the loss of their comrade; Terra over his lifeless body and Calvin in the toilets. Christine follows him there and finds him in despair. She explains that her mom died young, so she was raised by a black nanny, who taught her to love people regardless of race. be prejudice-free and, observing her racist controlling father, decides to not become like him.

After Christine's second refusal to leave, the brigadier tells Langerman that he has been authorised to send in the SWAT team. Meanwhile, Christine tells Calvin that she wants to help, so they open the bank door and she steps forward, calling out for Mandela's release, but a sniper shoots her while trying to kill Calvin behind her. Calvin drags her back into the bank where she dies. Afterwards, the mulatto woman removes her blond wig, hugs Terra in solidarity and has another conversation with Calvin. She tells him that she was given up for adoption by her mother to her white employers, who loved her but could never understand her "blackness". Calvin's tells her that his parents were shot dead by the poliuce when he was small, so he has dedicated his life to avenge them.

Calvin receives a call from Langerman, who warns him that the SWAT team is coming, but Calvin tells everyone that call was from the prime minister's office, announcing that Mandela will be free and that all the hostages now can leave the bank. Once the hostages have left, Calvin and Terra hold their own against the first SWAT team attack and then go down with their guns blazing.

The end credits explain that the Silverton Siege sparked the 'Free Nelson Mandela' campaign, which finally achieved his release 10 years later. Mandela became the first black South African president.

== Cast ==
- Thabo Rametsi as Calvin Khumalo
- Noxolo Dlamini as Mbali Terra Mabunda
- Stefan Erasmus as Aldo Erasmus
- Arnold Vosloo as Captain Johan Langerman
- Tumisho Masha as Sechaba, pilot
- Michelle Mosalakae as Rachel
- Elani Dekker as Christine, supervisor
- Shane Wellington as Cornelius Washington, American boxing promoter
- Deon Coetzee as Schoeman
- Justin Strydom as Hans

== Production ==
The film had officially been in development for two years as of 2019. Upon reading about the real life Silverton Siege of 1980, Dube became inspired and began developing a script with fellow American Film Institute alumnus Sechaba Morojele as editor. Dube said the film would be about 60% factual, and that they would use creative license for the rest, wanting to make it "an entertaining story, not a documentary". Principal photography took place on location in Pretoria. Production received funding from the National Film & Video Foundation.

The cast was announced alongside the release date announcement in March 2022; Thabo Rametsi, Noxolo Dlamini, and Stefan Erasmus would star as the Silverton trio alongside Arnold Vosloo, Tumisho Masha, Michelle Mosalakae, and Elani Dekker.

== Reception ==
On review website Rotten Tomatoes, the film holds an approval rating of 75% based on 8 reviews, with an average rating of 5.9/10.

According to African Folder, one of the film's strengths is the performances of its three leads, Calvin, Aldo, and Terra. The actors give their characters depth and nuance, making them feel like real people with complex motivations and emotions. Their performances are especially noteworthy during the tense standoff at the national bank, where they convey their characters' fear, desperation, and determination with intensity and authenticity.
