= Pretoria Arts Association =

Coordinates: 25.768°S 28.224°E

The Pretoria Arts Association (Afrikaans: Pretoria Kunsvereniging)is an organization for the promotion and study of the visual arts located in the Nieuw Muckleneuk neighborhood of Pretoria, South Africa.

== History ==
The South African Fine Arts Society was founded in 1871 in Cape Town, and in 1945 it was renamed the South African Arts Society. The North Transvaal branch was founded on September 27, 1947 in Pretoria. Charles Theodore Te Water, South Africa's High Commissioner in London, founded the branch and was its first president. The first chairman was artist Walter Battiss. In 1959, the organization bought land in Polley's Arcade and opened its first gallery, which moved in 1963 to the Old Netherlands Bank building and in 1978 to the 36th floor of the Volkskas Building, before finally reaching its current home on 173 Mackie Street in Nieuw Muckleneuk in 1991. In 1998, the parent South African Arts Society was renamed the South African National Association for the Visual Arts (SANAVA).
