= Elani =

Elani is a girl's name. The name means light and pacesetter. It's a variation of the name Eleanor.

Elani may refer to:

- Elani (band), Kenyan band
- Elani Dekker, South African actress and artist
- Elani Landman, South African squash player
