= Wierda Valley =

- Location within Gauteng Location within South Africa
- Coordinates: 26.113°S 28.057°E
- Country: South Africa
- Province: Gauteng
- Municipality: City of Johannesburg
- Main Place: Sandton

Area
  - Total: 0.36 km^{2} (0.14 sq mi)

Population (2011)
  - Total: 148
  - Density: 410/km^{2} (1,100/sq mi)

Racial makeup (2011)
  - Black African: 27.7%
  - Indian/Asian: 6.1%
  - White: 56.8%
  - Other: 9.5%

First languages (2011)
  - English: 58.4%
  - Afrikaans: 10w.1%
  - Tswana: 8.7%
  - Zulu: 3.4%
- Time zone: UTC+2 (SAST)
- Postal code (street): 2196

Wierda Valley is a suburb of Johannesburg, South Africa. It is named after Sytze Wierda, the first architect and engineer to the South African Republic. It is located in Region E of the City of Johannesburg Metropolitan Municipality.
