= Michelle Mosalakae =

South African actress (born 14 September 1994)

- Born: 14 September 1994 (age 31); Mabopane, Gauteng, South Africa
- Education: St. Mary's Diocesan School for Girls, Pretoria; Rhodes University
- Occupations: Actress, writer, brand ambassador (Savanna Cider), theatre director, entrepreneur
- Years active: 2017–present
- Parent: Sarah Mosalakae

Michelle Mosalakae (born 14 September 1994) is a South African actress, writer and theatre director.

== Early life and education ==
Michelle Mosalakae was born in Mabopane, north of Pretoria to Tswana parents. She developed her love of acting at an early age. As a young girl, she would act for her family and friends. She attended St. Mary's Diocesan school, Pretoria, where during this time she began acting in school productions regularly. After matriculating, she went onto attend Rhodes University, Grahamstown where she graduated cum laude, with a degree in English, achieving honours in acting, directing and applied drama.

== Career ==
In 2017, she landed the role of Zakithi a young traditional healer on Mzansi Magic's primetime TV drama Isibaya. The role would prove to be her breakthrough role, bringing her wider recognition and making her an instant household name. Due to her performance on Isibaya, she was nominated for Rising star in the 2017 DStv Mzansi Viewers' Choice Awards.

In March 2018, alongside MTV Base presenter Kim Jayde, media personalities Bontle Modiselle and Loot Love, Michelle was announced as a Revlon ambassador, making her the first person with albinism to be made an ambassador for the international cosmetic giant. ' While continuing her work in theatre as an actress and director, she went on to land a role as a Congolese villainess, Kamina on Mzansi Magic's, The Queen (South African TV series).

In March 2019, she was nominated for a Naledi Theatre Award for Best Lead performance in a play for her work in Shoes & Coups, directed and written by Palesa Mazamisa.

In April 2022, Mosalakae made her film debut in the Netflix action-thriller Silverton Siege where she plays the character of Rachel Paige.

== Personal life ==
Mosalakae is Christian. She is very close with her family and friends who have always supported her. She has albinism, a genetic mutation which inhibits melanin production. Mosalakae has always been proud of who she is. She is managed by her mother Sarah, who she is very close with.
