= 2017 DStv Mzansi Viewers' Choice Awards =

South African entertainment award ceremony

- Date: August 26, 2017
- Location: Sandton Convention Centre
- Hosted by: Bonang Matheba
- Website: http://www.mzansimagic.tv/dstvmvca

Television/radio coverage
- Network: Mzansi Magic

The 2017 DStv Mzansi Viewers' Choice Awards ceremony was held on August 26, 2017 at Sandton Convention Centre, Johannesburg. The awards honoured the year's achievements in television, music, sports, and comedy voted by viewers in South Africa.

== Performances ==
Performers are not in particular order of performance
Artist(s)	Song(s)
AKA and Anatii	Holy Mountain
Lady Zamar; Prince Kaybee; Zodwa Wabantu	Charlotte
Thandiswa Mazwai	
Tshedi Mholo; Cassper Nyovest	Destiny (Malaika song); Destiny (Cassper's song)
Lebo Sekgobela	Lion Of Judah
Hugh Masekela	
DJ Cleo; Winnie Khumalo; Bhizer; Busiswa; S.C Gorna; Trigger Bhepepe	Yile Gqom (DJ Cleo and Winnie Khumalo); Gobisiqolo (Bhizer, Busiswa, S.C Gorna and Bhepepe)

== Winners and nominees ==
=== Favourite Song of the Year ===
Prince Kaybee (featuring Lady Zamar) - "Charlotte"

- Musa (featuring Robbie Malinga) - "Mthande"
- Black Motion (featuring Nokwazi)- "iMali"
- Bhizer (featuring Busiswa, S.C Gorna and Bhepepe) - "Gobisiqolo"
- Okmalumkoolkat - "Gqi"

=== Favourite TV Presenter ===
Thembisa Mdoda

- Robert Marawa
- Pearl Modiadie
- Phat Joe
- Bonang Matheba
- Iminam Tatiya

=== Favourite Comedian ===
Summary

- Skhumba
- Celeste Ntuli
- Tumi Morake
- Mashabela

=== Favourite Rising Star ===
Sjava

- Amanda Black
- Zamani Mbatha
- Michelle Mosalakae
- Andile Phehlukwayo

=== Favourite Radio Personality ===
BA2CADA

- T-Bose
- Tbo Touch
- Anele Mdoda
- Sgqemeza

=== Favourite Actor ===
Themba Ndaba

- Ntokozo Dlamini
- Warren Masemola
- Siyabonga Thwala
- Sello Maake Ka-Ncube

=== Favourite Actress ===
Vatiswa Ndara

- Thuso Mbedu
- Masasa Mbangeni
- Lorcia Cooper
- Dawn Thandeka King

=== Favourite Music Artist/Group ===
Kwesta

- Lebo Sekgobela
- Black Motion
- AKA
- Cassper Nyovest

=== Favourite DJ ===
Black Coffee

- DJ Zinhl & DJ Tira
- Prince Kaybee
- DJ Shimza
- DJ Tira

=== Favourite Sports Personality ===
Caster Semenya

- Wayde van Niekerk
- Kagiso Rabada
- Keagan Dolly
- Akani Simbine

=== Ultimate Viewers' Choice Award ===
Thembisa Mdoda

=== 1Life Life Changer Award ===
Mama' Anna

=== Lifetime Achievement Award ===
Hugh Masekela
