= Toorbos =

2019 film

- Film poster
- Directed by: Rene van Rooyen
- Starring: Sean Brebnor
- Release date: 24 August 2019
- Running time: 120 minutes
- Country: South Africa
- Language: Afrikaans

Toorbos is a 2019 South African drama film directed by Rene van Rooyen about a young woman's conflict between her ideals and those of her husband.

== Plot ==
Set in the 1930s before the outbreak of World War II, in the time of the final forest dwellers of the incredible Knysna forest. The film tells the story of Karoliena, a young woman who is born into a poverty stricken community of poor subsistence farmers and foresters. Karoliena quickly attracts the attention of Johannes, a successful businessman from town who promises to take her away from her impoverished existence. Enchanted by him and the prospects of his life, she agrees to go to Knysna where she’s trained to become a respected lady. She begins to adapt to his way of life, including being subservient to her husband. She soon chafes in this role as she begins to notice the differences between the forest she grew up in and the new town she's moved to with her husband. To Karoliena the forest is magical, mythical and spiritual, where the town is centered around a selfish desire for money. When Karoliena realizes that she has exchanged her precious freedom for a cage, it’s too late, and she’s petrified. Her discomfort increases when she learns of her husband's disregard for the forest from which she came.

== Cast ==
- Sean Brebnor as Faan Mankvoet
- Elani Dekker as Karoliena Kapp
- Stiaan Smith as Johannes Stander
- Lida Botha as Elmiena
- Ira Blanckenberg as Meliena
- Andre Odendaal as Cornelius
- Ivan Abrahams as Bothatjie
- Gretchen Ramsden as Hestertjie

== Production ==
Production took place in mid 2018, in Knysna forest.

== Release ==
The film was released on 13 November 2020, South Africa.

== Reception ==
The film was selected as the South African entry for the Best International Feature Film at the 93rd Academy Awards, but it was not nominated.

== See also ==
- List of submissions to the 93rd Academy Awards for Best International Feature Film
- List of South African submissions for the Academy Award for Best International Feature Film
