= Gretchen Ramsden =

South African actress

- Born: 29 March 1995 (age 31)
- Education: University of Cape Town
- Occupation: Actress
- Years active: 2016–present

Gretchen Ramsden (born 29 March 1995) is a South African actress. She is best known for her roles in Arendsvlei and Afgrond.

== Early life ==
In 2014, she enrolled to the University of Cape Town (UCT) and graduated in 2017 with a Bachelor of Arts in Theatre and Performance. During her time at UCT, she performed in many student stage productions such as Lied van die Boeings, All's Well That Ends Well, Kristalvlakte, Agamemnon and Judas.

== Career ==
In 2017, Ramsden appeared in the Afrikaans drama Die Dans van die Watermeid. In 2018, she became a voice artist, by voicing for the role of "Sengül Dogan" in the Afrikaans dub of the Turkish telenovela Yasak Elma translated to Doodsondes. In the same year, she began playing the supporting character of Nicolene in the kykNET & kie telenovela Arendsvlei. In 2019, she made her film debut in Toorbos, an adaptation of the novel of the same name by Dalene Matthee. In 2021, she made her first television lead role as "Nadine May" in the kykNET drama serial Afgrond. She also appeared in the films Arena and Chalk And Cheese.

== Filmography ==
Year	Film	Role	Genre	Ref.
2018	Arendsvlei	Nicolene Arendse	TV series	
2019	Toorbos	Hestertjie	Film	
2019	The to Do List	Jane	Short film	
2021	Afgrond	Nadine May	TV series	
2024	Carissa	Carissa	Film	
