= Carissa (film) =

2024 film

- Directed by: Jason Jacobs; Devon Delmar
- Written by: Jason Jacobs; Devon Delmar
- Starring: Gretchen Ramsden
- Cinematography: Gray Kotzé
- Edited by: Devon Delmar
- Music by: Frazer Barry; Devon Delmar; Mikhaila Alyssa Smith
- Distributed by: REASON8
- Release date: 5 September 2024 (Venice)
- Country: South Africa
- Language: Afrikaans

Carissa is a 2024 South African coming-of-age drama film written and directed by Jason Jacobs and Devon Delmar, in their feature film debut. It premiered at the 81st edition of the Venice Film Festival.

== Cast ==
- Gretchen Ramsden as Carissa
- Herchell Cloete as Herchell
- Woudine Dirkse as Woudine
- Collin Fredericks as Collin
- Kaylin Fredericks as Ashley
- Wilhelmiena Hesselman as Wilhelmien
- Deidré Jantjies as Deidré
- Hendrik Kriel as Hendrik
- Elton Landrew as Solly
- Maria Tamboer as Maria

== Production ==
The film was shot in Wupperthal, a town in the Cederberg region. The cast consists mainly of local non-professional actors whose roles are largely based on themselves.

A work-in-progress cut of the film was presented at the 80th Venice International Film Festival in the Final Cut in Venice (FVC) sidebar, where the project received three cash awards, including the Venice Final Cut prize for best film in post-production.

== Release ==
The film had its world premiere at the 81st Venice International Film Festival in the Orizzonti section. It had its American premiere at the 40th Santa Barbara International Film Festival. International distribution is handled by London-based REASON8.

== Reception ==
Variety's film critic Guy Lodge praised the film, describing it as "simultaneously still and transporting" and writing: "if there’s a lot of muzzy magic-hour beauty in Jason Jacobs and Devon Delmar’s debut feature, it’s no hollow travelogue: Closely scrutinizing its young, antsy title character before gradually expanding its gaze, “Carissa” is rich with feeling for the callused hands and hearts of an overlooked but industrious countryside population".

Paul Emmanuel Enicola from The Movie Buff wrote: "Carissa stands out as a film with something real to say. Jacobs and Delmar deliver a thoughtful, visually striking meditation on identity and change, carried by a strong central performance and a deep sense of place".
