= Ou Raadsaal =

Historic parliament building in Pretoria, South Africa

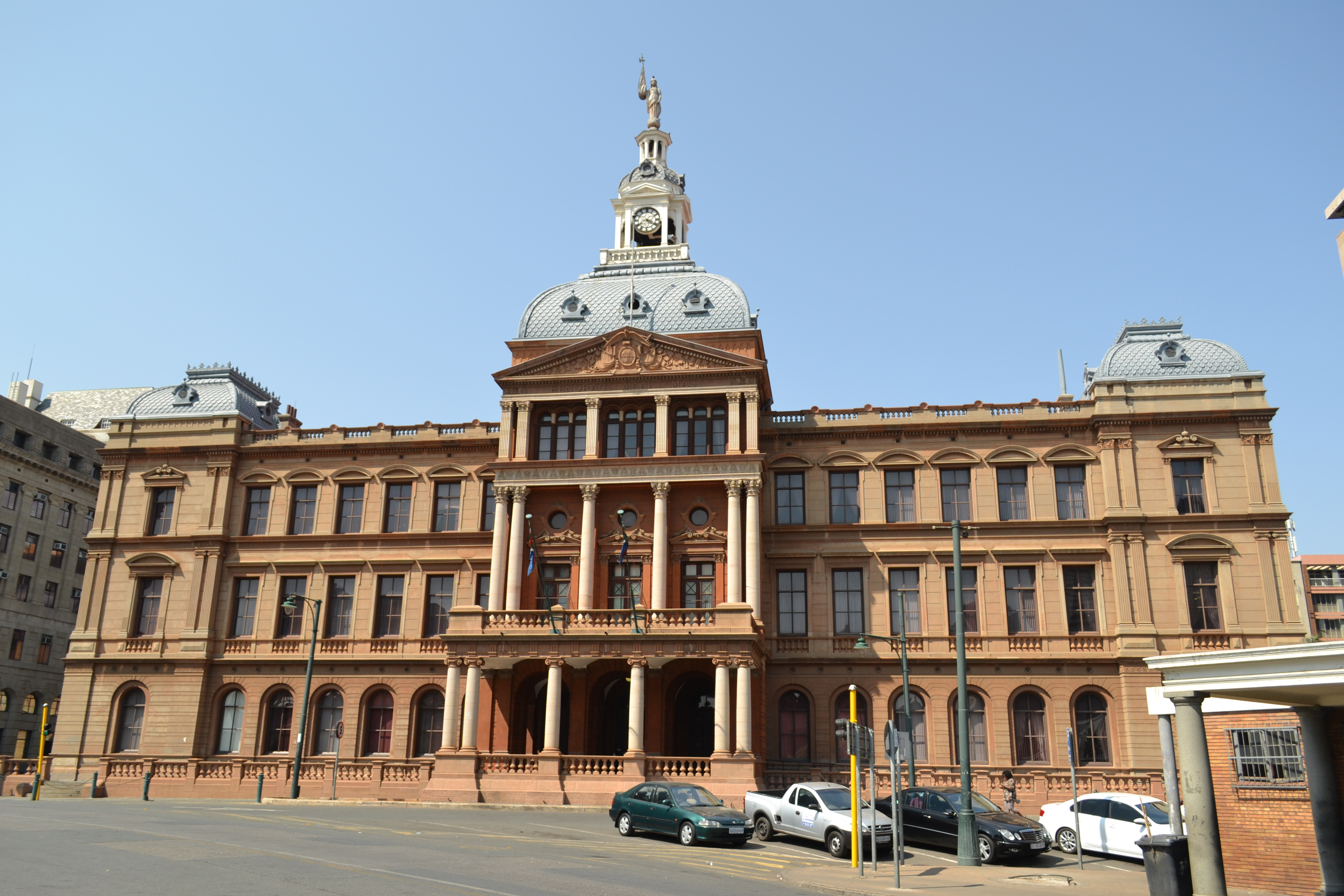
- The Ou Raadsaal from Church Square
- Interactive map of the Ou Raadsaal area

General information
- Architectural style: Renaissance Revival
- Location: Church Square, Pretoria, South Africa
- Coordinates: 25°44′50″S 28°11′16″E
- Construction started: February 1889
- Completed: December 1891; 134 years ago
- Cost: £82,500 GBP in 1889; (equivalent to £9,165,781 in 2025; or R 183 million)

Design and construction
- Architect: Sytze Wierda
- Main contractor: John Johnstone Kirkness

The Ou Raadsaal (English: Old Council Hall) is a historic building in Pretoria, South Africa, located on the south side of Church Square. The Ou Raadsaal housed the Volksraad, the parliament of the South African Republic, from 1891 to 1902.

The Ou Raadsaal was commissioned in the late 19th century by the South African Republic as the new seat of government in Pretoria, and was designed by Dutch architect Sytze Wierda in a Renaissance Revival style. The contract for construction was granted to John Johnstone Kirkness, a builder from the Orkney Islands with a prolific building career in the region, at a sum of £82,500. Construction began in February 1889 with the cornerstone laid by President Paul Kruger on 6 May that year, and the work was completed in December 1891. The Transvaal Museum was established in 1892 in the upper floor of Ou Raadsaal, but was soon moved to a separate location when the room was deemed too small for the collection. In 1902, the South African Republic was annexed by the United Kingdom after its defeat in the Second Boer War, abolishing the Volksraad, and the Ou Raadsaal became vacant.

In 1999, the Ou Raadsaal was declared a Provincial Heritage Site and is protected in terms of Section 34 of the National Heritage Resources Act (Act 25 of 1999), as it is over 60 years old. The building is also known in English as the Old Council Chamber or Old Government Building, and in Afrikaans as the Republikeinse Raadsaal.
