= Palace of Justice, Pretoria =

Historic courthouse in Pretoria, South Africa

Coordinates: 25.7475°S 28.1878°E

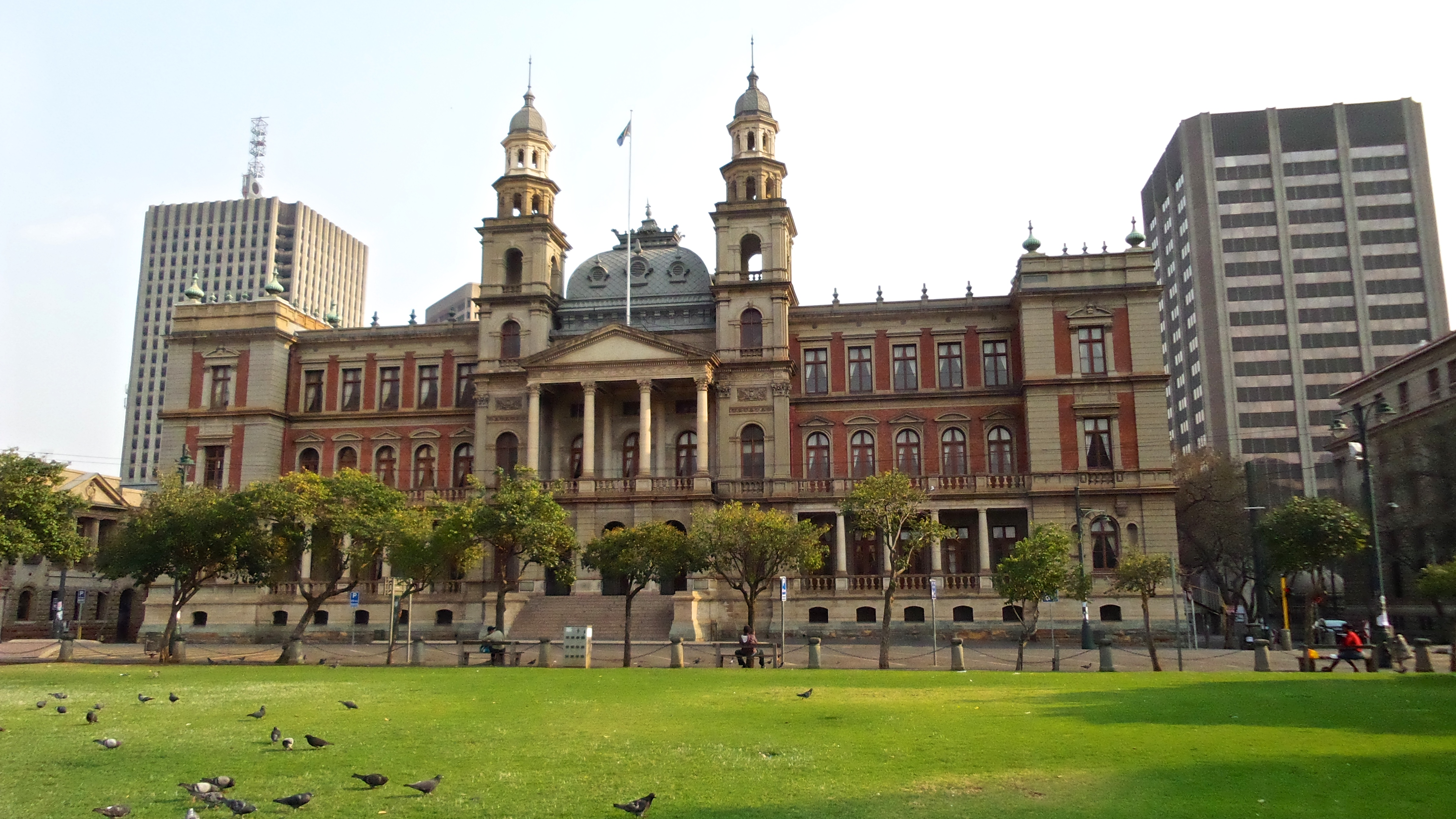
The Palace of Justice on Church Square in Pretoria

The Palace of Justice forms part of the northern façade of Church Square in Pretoria. The building dates to the nineteenth century and was designed by the Dutch architect Sytze Wierda. It is currently the headquarters of the Gauteng Division of the High Court of South Africa.

The foundation stone was laid on June 8, 1897 by South African Republic (ZAR) President Paul Kruger.

The most famous political trial in South Africa's history, the Rivonia Trial, took place here. During the trial, Nelson Mandela and a number of other prominent African National Congress (ANC) members were charged with treason and subsequently jailed.

== Construction ==
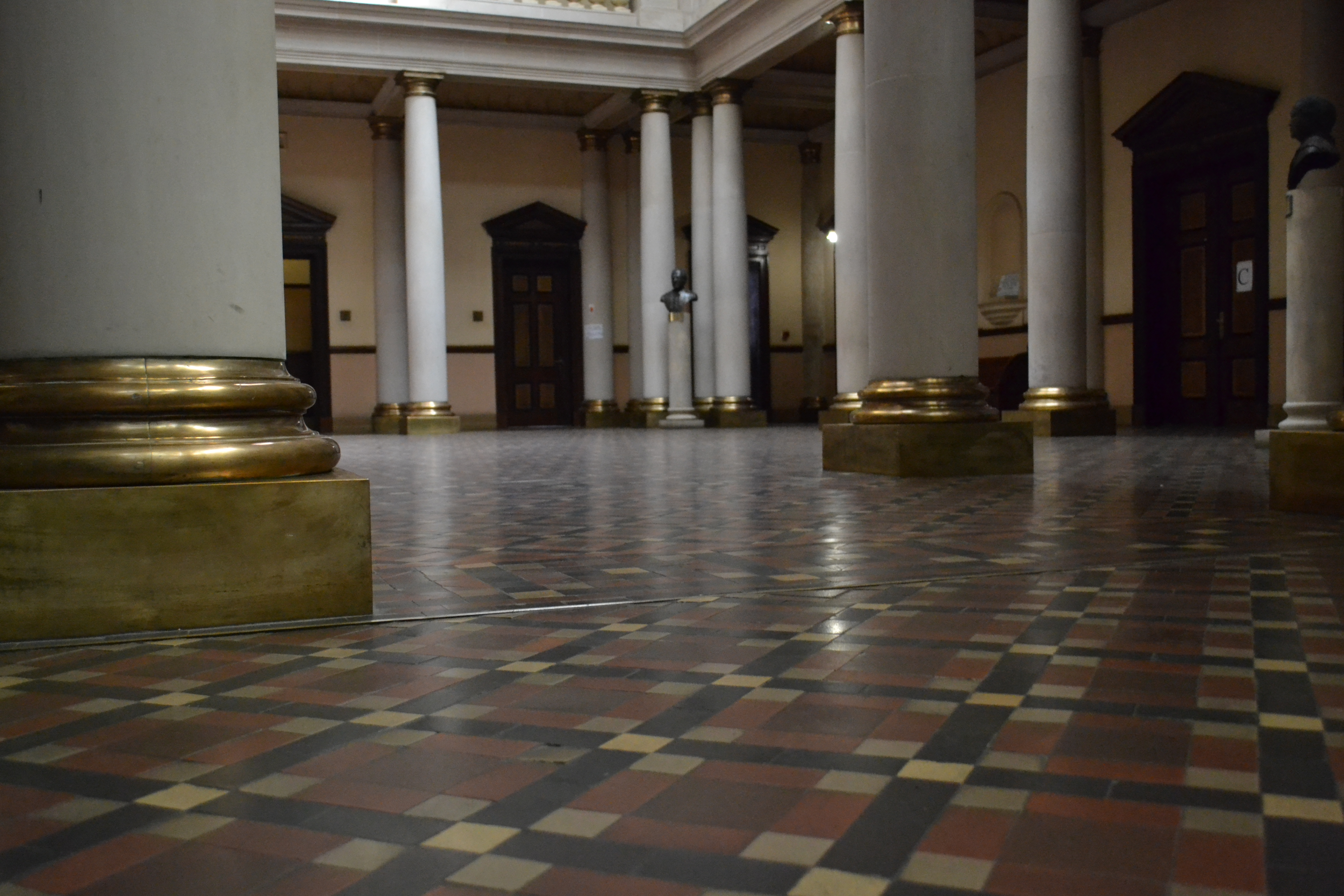
Palace of Justice interior

The Palace of Justice was built by the Departement van Publieke Werken (DPW) under the guidance of design architect Sytze Wierda and builder John Munro. Construction of the building took place during the Second Boer War, during which it was used temporarily as a hospital for British soldiers. The interior design features an ornate combination of polished wood, brass, stained glass, tiled floors, and several other prestigious fixtures for its era. At the time of completion, construction costs totaled £115 260.

== See also ==
- List of castles and fortifications in South Africa
