= Hemrik =

Hemrik De Himrik
- Village
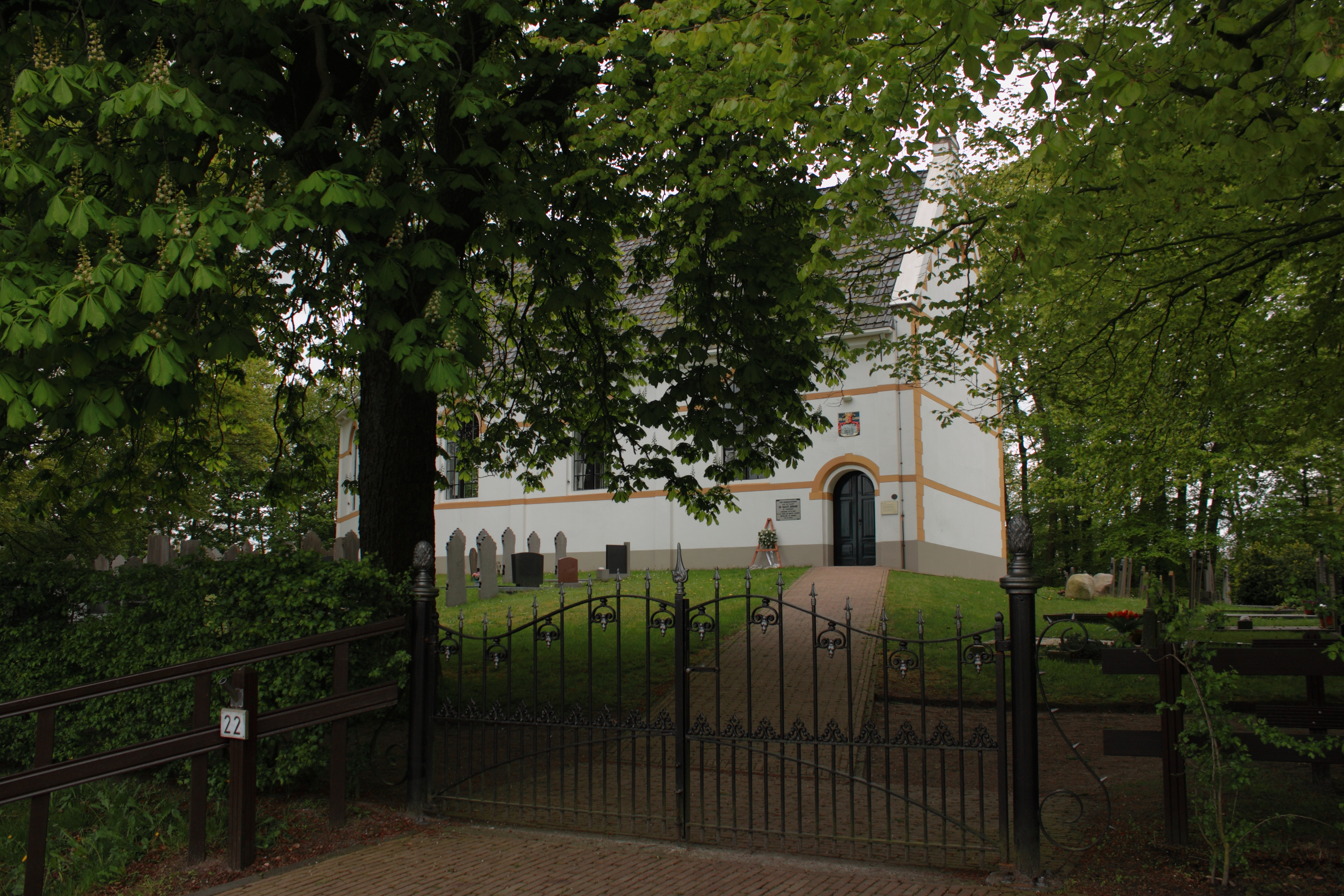
- White church

- Flag Coat of arms

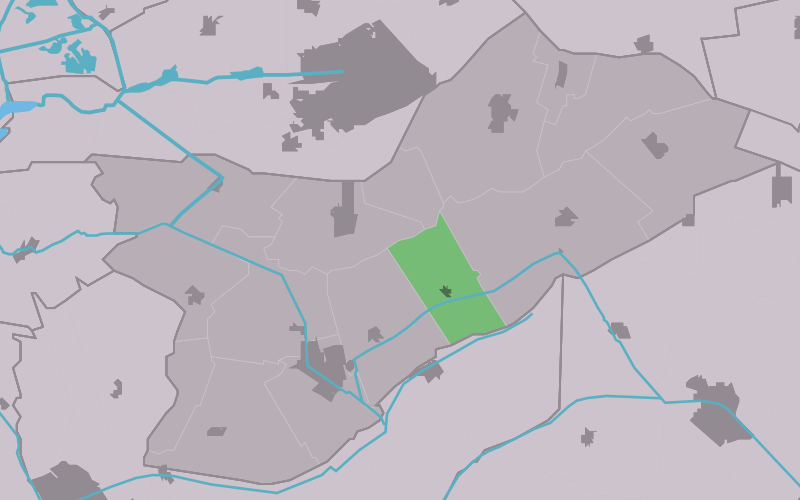
- Location in Opsterland municipality

- Location in the Netherlands Hemrik (Netherlands)
- Country: Netherlands
- Province: Friesland
- Municipality: Opsterland

Area
  - Total: 10.89 km^{2} (4.20 sq mi)
- Elevation: 5 m (16 ft)

Population (2021)
  - Total: 755
  - Density: 69.3/km^{2} (180/sq mi)
- Time zone: UTC+1 (CET)
  - Summer (DST): UTC+2 (CEST)
- Postal code: 8409
- Dialing code: 0516

Hemrik (West Frisian: De Himrik) is a village in the municipality of Opsterland in the east of Friesland, the Netherlands. It had a population of around 770 in January 2017.

The village was first mentioned in 1315 as Hemericke, and means village area. Hemrik developed on a sandy ridge in a heath and moorland region. Around 1750, the Opsterlandse Compagnonsvaart was dug for the excavation of peat. A chapel existed in the village as early as 1315. The Dutch Reformed church dates from 1739, and is colloquially called White Church due its white plaster.

Hemrik was home to 352 people in 1840.

== Gallery ==
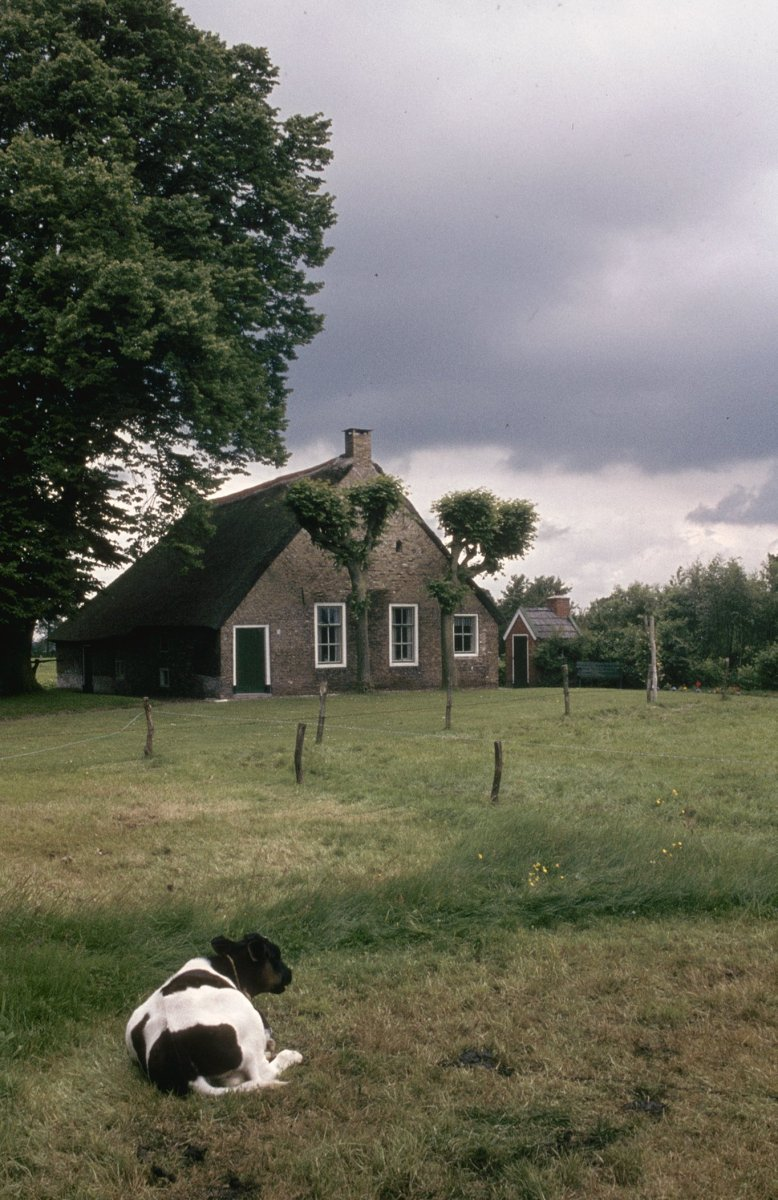
Farm near Hemrik

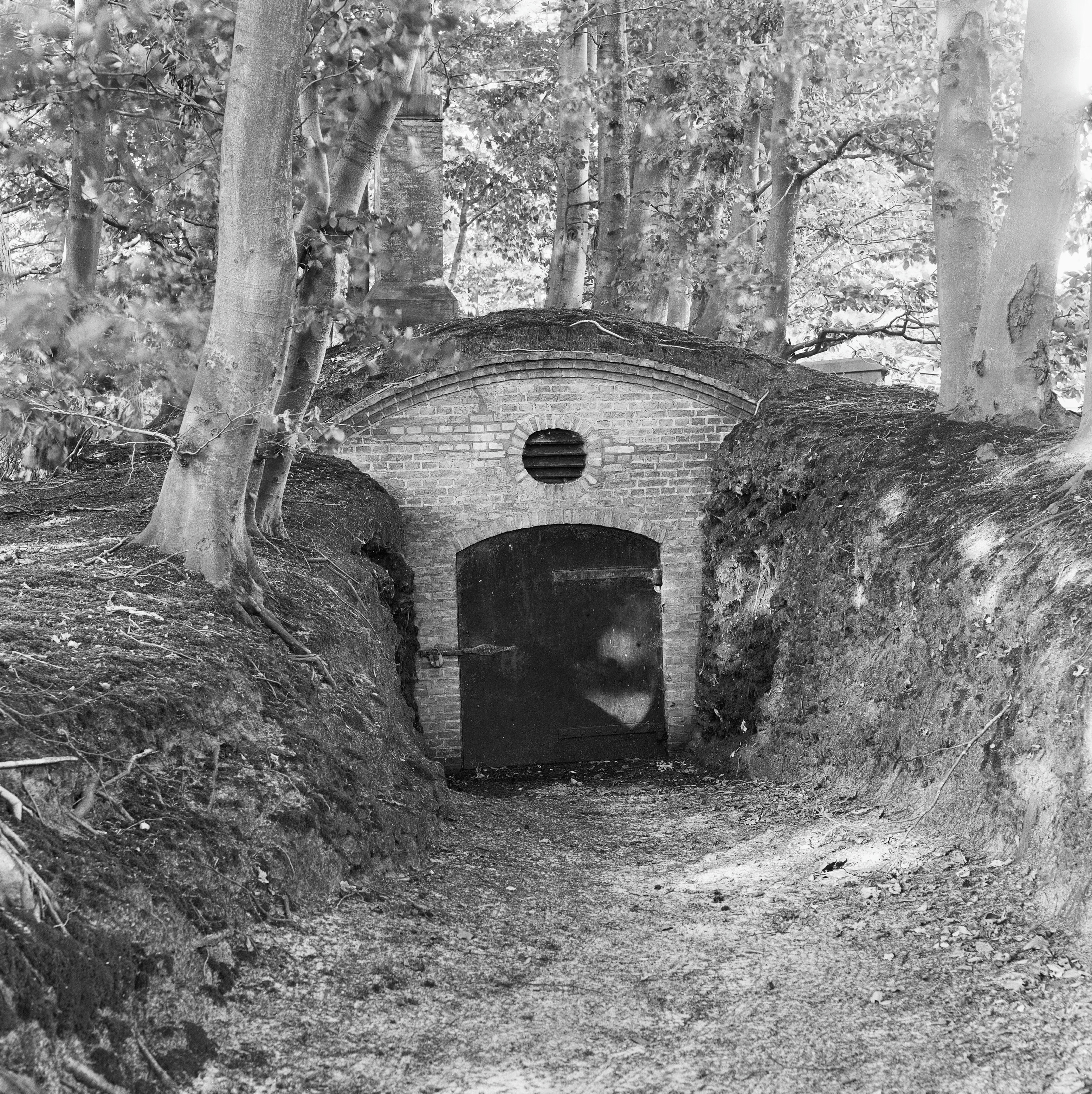
Burial vault

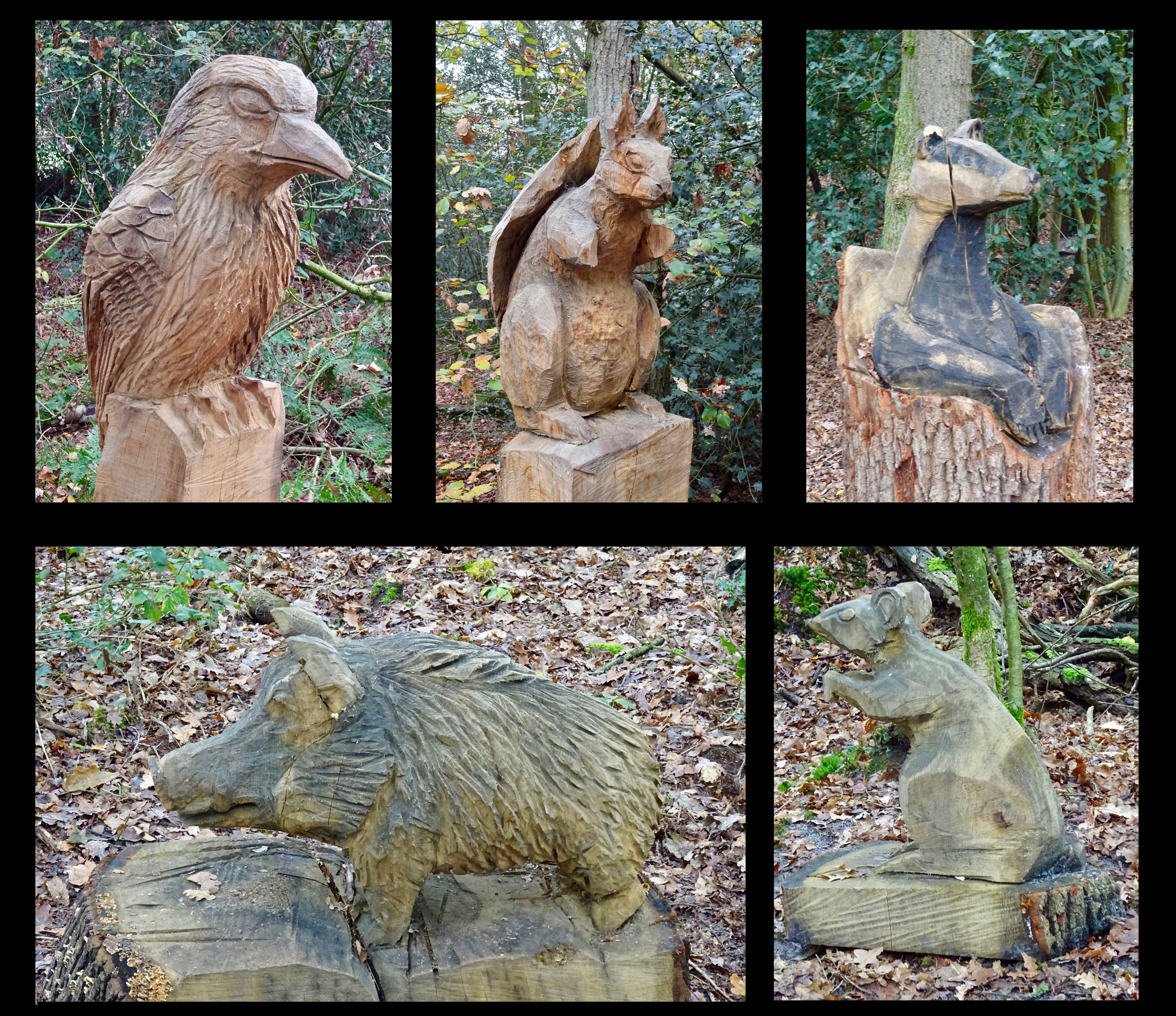
Children's play forest near Hemrik
