= Old Netherlands Bank building =

Coordinates: 25°44′49.34″S 28°11′13.86″E

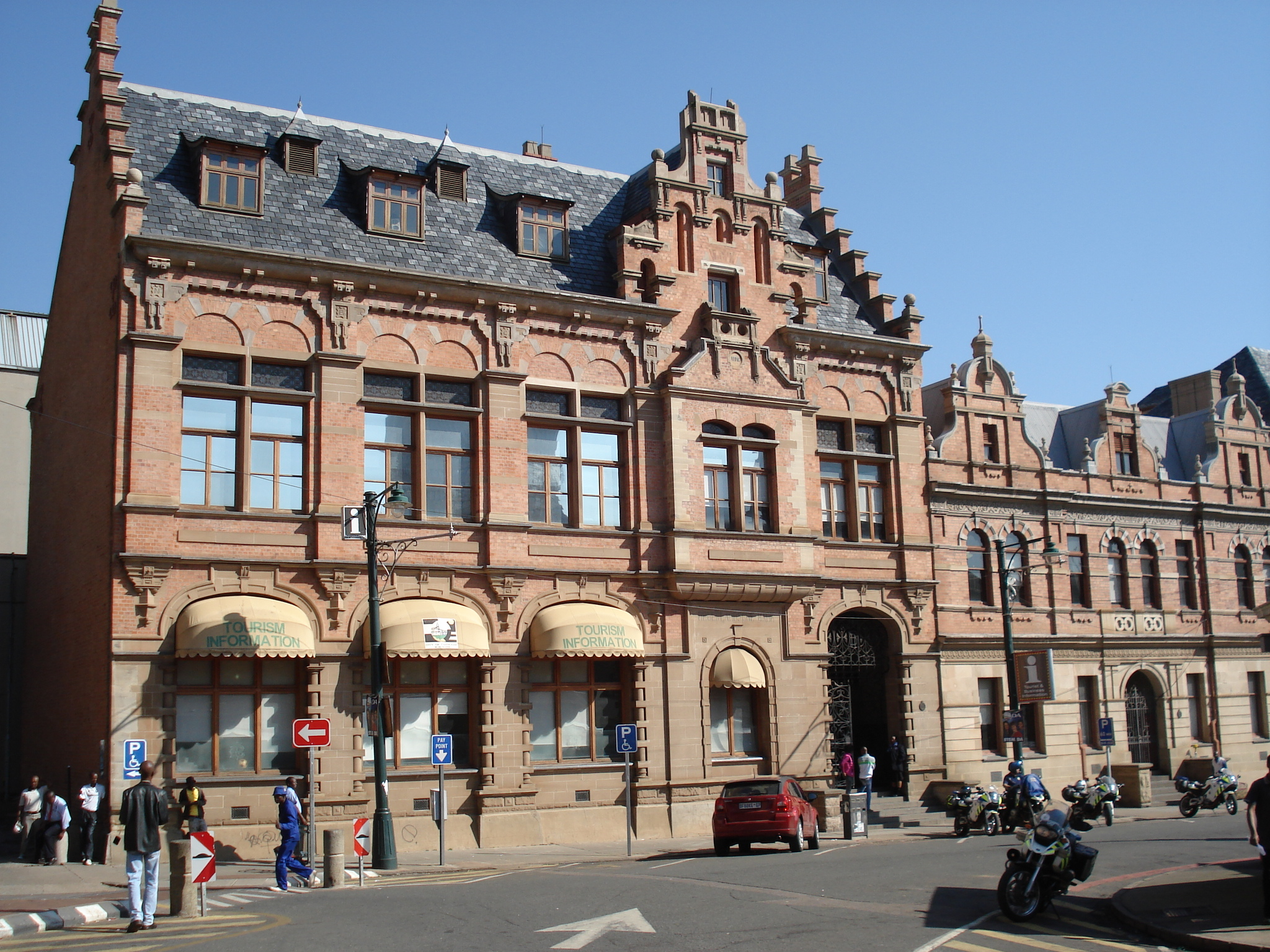
The Old Netherlands Bank building.

The Old Netherlands Bank building (Afrikaans: Ou Nederlandse Bankgebou, Dutch: Oude Nederlandsche Bankgebouw) is a building on Church Square in the South African administrative capital of Pretoria. The building carries the name of the former Nederlandsche Bank voor Suid-Afrika (now Nedbank) and is one of the protected buildings on the western side of the Square.

== History ==
=== Bank building ===
On March 23, 1888, the Nederlandsche Bank en Credietvereniging voor Zuid-Afrika ("Dutch Bank and Credit Union for South Africa") was founded in Amsterdam. The same year, a primary branch office was established in Pretoria, the capital of the then South African Republic (ZAR). By 1898, the bank had already opened four branches in the Republic. Dutch architect Willem de Zwaan was commissioned thus in 1896 to designed a building for the Netherlands Bank. He designed it in the Dutch Renaissance style. All the wrought iron work was done by the F.W. Braat company out of Delft, Netherlands.

On December 2, 1997, the bank opened its doors in the new building. When completed, it was the Netherlands Bank's third branch, and was one of seven bank branches located around Church Square. In 1914, a fire destroyed the second (top) floor of the building.

When the Old Netherlands Bank registered its South African branch under the name Nederlandse Bank in Suid-Afrika ("Dutch Bank in South Africa") as an independent subsidiary in 1951, the South African government bought the property, which has remained in its hands ever since. Nedbank kept its headquarters on the ground floor until 1953, when it moved to Johannesburg. The first floor was rented out to the Zuid-Afrikaansche Fabrieken Voor Ontplofbare Stoffen ("South African Factory for Explosive Substances").

=== University ===
From 1975 to 1977, the building was used as a headquarters for the Department of Architecture at the University of Pretoria. The university has also used the building as a temporary exhibition space, making it a key destination for connoisseurs of architecture. Therefore, State President of South Africa Marais Viljoen declared the western edge of Church Square a national monument.

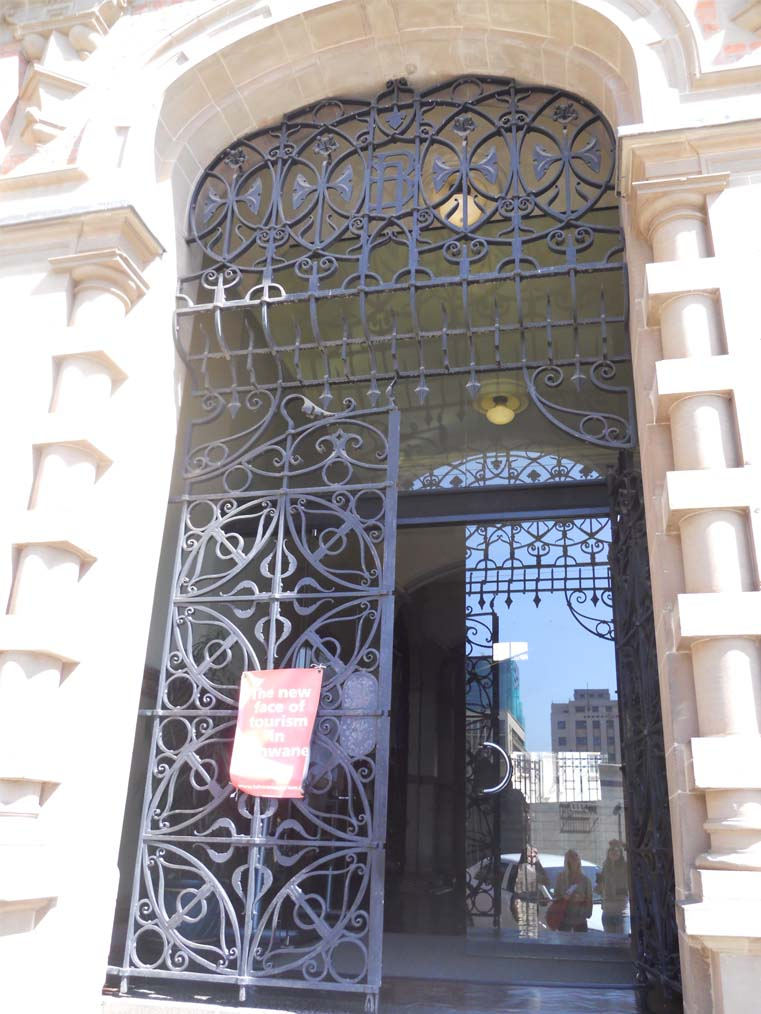
The entrance of the Old Netherlands Bank building in Pretoria has tulip motifs in the Jugendstil style.

In 1993, a commemorative plate was revealed bearing the names of 64 schools in Pretoria that advocated for the national monument designation.

== Current use ==
The Tshwane Tourist Information Centre began offering the building as a local office in 2000 for the Vereniging voor Vreemdelingenverkeer. The Centre rents the building from the provincial government of Gauteng. The offices on the first floor served as the new Local Economic Development en Business Library.

== Architecture ==
The facade of the building is sandstone, while the sides are red brick. The joints are rounded with occasional cut joints for accent, common in the Dutch Renaissance style. The fencing and interiors are rendered in Art Nouveau. Including a cast-iron railing with tulip accents, such fencing was made by Braat.

== Sources ==
- Beeld. 1979. "Alles draai altyd om Kerkplein." 17 August 1979. Archives. Department of Architecture. University of Pretoria.
- Beeld. 1980. "Nederlandsche Bank." 11 August 1980. Archives. Department of Architecture. University of Pretoria.
- De Beer, D. 1975. "Banking will never be the same." Pretoria News of 1 May 1975. City Council Public Library. Pretoria.
- De Beer, D. 1977. "The beautiful gates which will take some undoing." Pretoria News of 31 March 1977. City Council Public Library. Pretoria.
- Meiring, H. 1977. "Die Nederlandse Bankgebou, Pretoria." Boukunste van Suid Afrika. Pretoria: Human & Rousseau.
- Munitoria. 1953. "Kerkplein 10 Oktober 1953." Munitoria Photo Archives. Department of Architecture. University of Pretoria.
- Museum-memo. 1988. "Sandsteen rekonstruksie aan die ou Nederlandse Bankgebou." Vol 16 no 1. 03/1988. City Council Public Library. Pretoria.
- Oggendblad. 1981. "Hoofposkantoor gerestoureer." 28 January 1981. City Council Public Library. Pretoria.
- Oggendblad. 1929. "Staircase of Nederlandsche Bank." 29 May 1929 p 10. Archives. Department of Architecture. University of Pretoria.
- Rekord-Moot. 1993. "Wesfassade nou vir altyd gered." 11 June 1993. City Council Public Library. Pretoria.
- Sithole, J. 2010. Tshwane Tourism Information Centre. Interview on 26 August 2010.
