= Church Square, Pretoria =

Square at the historic centre of Pretoria

Church Square
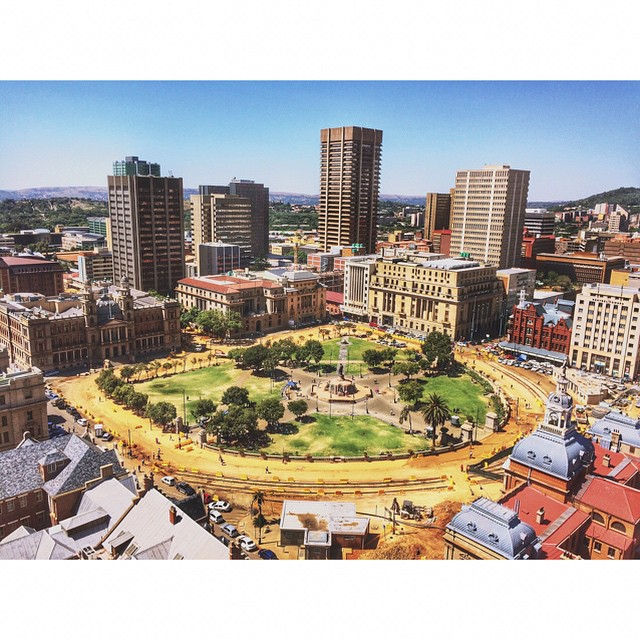
- Interactive map of Church Square
- Native name: Kerkplein (Afrikaans)
- Former name: Market Square
- Area: 1 ha
- Coordinates: 25.7465°S 28.1882°E
- North: Palace of Justice
- East: Tudor Chambers
- South: Ou Raadsaal
- West: Old Netherlands Bank building, Old Capitol Theatre

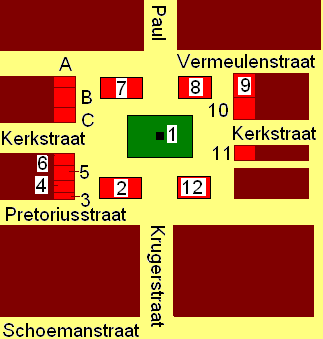
1. Statue Paul Kruger (Anton van Wouw); 2. Old ZAR Council Chamber (Sytze Wierda) 1891; 3. Old Capitol Theatre (PR Cooke) 1931; 4. Old Netherlands Bank (Wilhelm de Zwaan) 1897; 5. Regskamers (Phillip, Carmicheal & Murray) 1891; 6. Café Riche (Francois Soff) 1905; 7. Palace of Justice (Sytze Wierda) 1902; 8. Old Reserve Bank and Old Old Mutual Building (Baker & Leith and Frederick McIntosh Glennie) 1930 and 1929; 9. Ons Eerste Volksbank (Cowin & Ellis) 1930; 10. Barclays Bank (Gordon Leith) ca 1930; 11. Tudor Chambers (John Ellis) 1904; 12. Standard Bank (Stucke & Harrison) 1934; 1. Bank of Africa (TA & FRE Sladdin) 1906; 2. Old National Bank and Mint Building and Old National Bank Chambers (F Emley & Scott and unknown architect) 1892 and 1903; 3. General Post Office (William Hawke) 1910

Church Square (Afrikaans: Kerkplein), originally Market Square (Dutch: Marktplein), is the square at the historic centre of the city of Pretoria, Gauteng, South Africa. The founder of Pretoria, Marthinus Pretorius, determined that the square be used as a market place and church yard. It was subsequently named for the church buildings that stood at the centre of the square from 1856 to 1905. The square's most prominent feature, since June 1954, is the statue of the late Boer leader and president of the South African Republic, Paul Kruger, at its centre. Statues of four anonymous Boer citizen-soldiers surround that of Kruger on a lower level of the plinth.

== Current buildings ==
Several historically and architecturally significant buildings surround the square: the Palace of Justice, the Old Capitol Theatre, the Tudor Chambers, the Ou Raadsaal (Old Council Chamber) and the General Post Office, which was designed by William Hawke.

== 2014 revamping project ==
In keeping with the historical value of the square, a rejuvenation project was announced in 2014 in the old Raadsaal. Roads around the square would be converted for exclusive use by the A Re Yeng ("Let's Go") bus service and its service vehicles, while pedestrian areas would be made more public-friendly. The defunct south wall's fountain head would be restored and trees would be planted around the square. Numerous street benches would be provided and the square's tar walkways would be replaced with slate. The Kruger statues at the centre of the square would remain, and the square will be closed for hawkers.

== History ==
=== Market ===
Produce was conveyed to the Market Square by wagon, where their owners' oxen were also outspanned. The produce, if not sold direct from the wagon, would be placed on the ground amidst the trek oxen and the cattle and horses for sale. A first market shed was erected by the municipality after 1910 which led to a legal battle between the Pretoria Market and Estate Company and the town council. This was finally decided by Lord de Villiers at Bloemfontein, whose verdict gave the council control over 3/4 of the square, while the Market and Estate Company retained control of the Market Hall and buildings on the square's north-western corner for about another 40 years. The building of further sheds and the paving of the Market Square c. 1917 were consequences of Lord de Villiers' verdict.

Lines for horse-drawn trams initially connected the railway station with Market, Church, du Toit and Esselen streets to the terminus at the east end of de Kock Street. This company ceased operations at the outbreak of war in 1899, and it was not until c. 1904 that the municipality purchased their concession and restarted it. Only in November 1910 were electric trams put into operation.

=== Churches ===
The square became known as Church Square due to a succession of three churches that stood at the center of the square. The first church on Church Square was built in 1856 by Skinner and Devereux, and inaugurated in 1857. This was replaced by a larger building, which burnt down in 1882. This simple Cape Dutch style building was replaced by an early Gothic style building, built by Claridge, together with Leslie Simmonds. This third church building, known as the Verenigde Kerk, was demolished in 1904/1905, shortly after president Paul Kruger's state funeral was conducted from it.

=== Fountain ===
According to a Minute of His Worship the Mayor (Andrew Johnson) for the Mayoral Year ending 25th October 1905, Municipality of Pretoria, a fountain was proposed for the square by Mr. Samuel Marks. This piece in turn was moved to the Pretoria Zoo, making way for the current collection of sculptures.

=== Rivonia trial ===
The turreted Palace of Justice was the scene of arguably the most famous political trial in South Africa's history, the Rivonia Trial. During this trial, Nelson Mandela and a number of other ANC members were charged with treason, found guilty and subsequently incarcerated.

== Nearby landmarks ==
Nearby Pretoria landmarks include the State Theatre, City Hall, the historic Kruger House and Paul Kruger church.

== Gallery ==
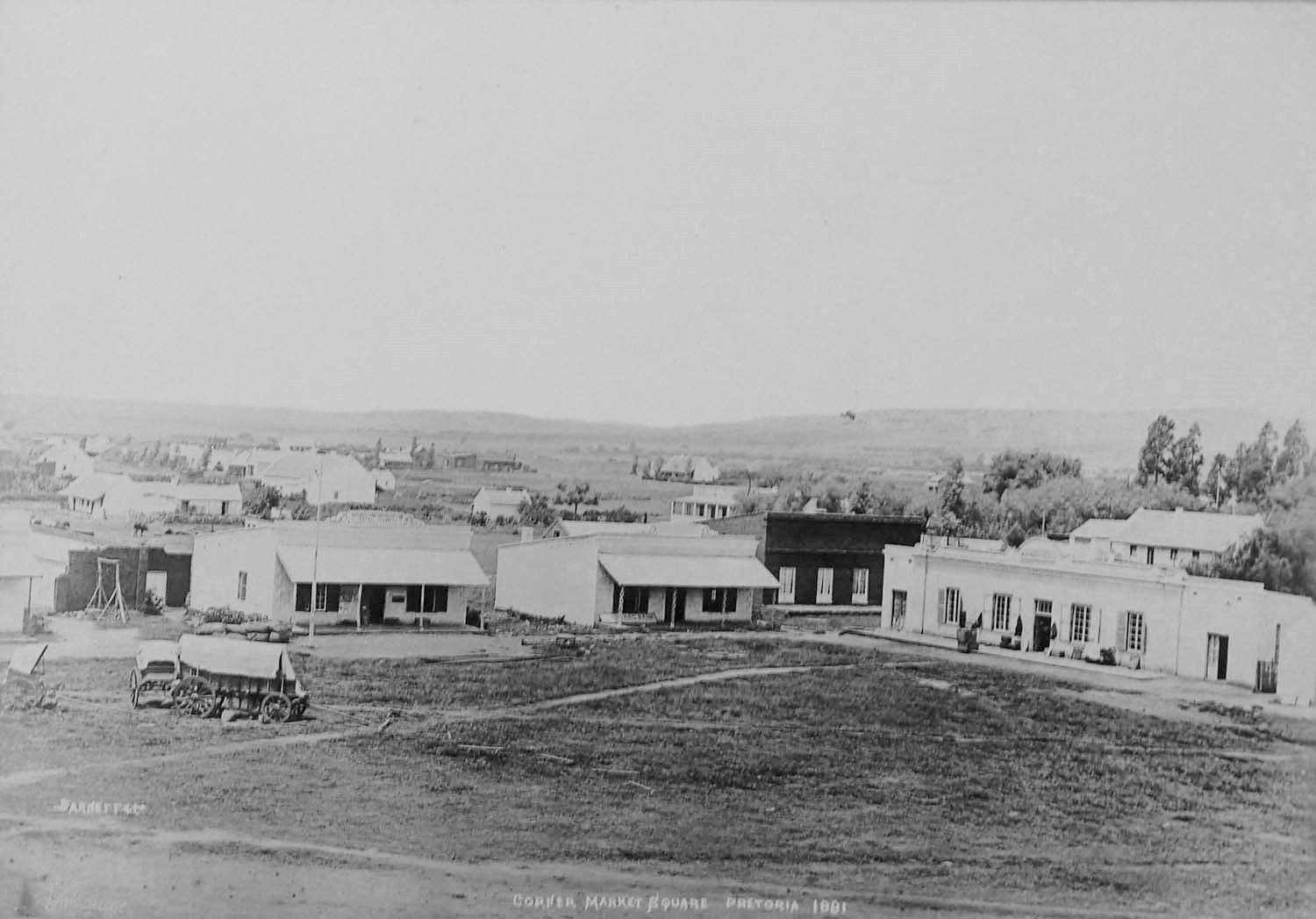
The original Market Square in 1881

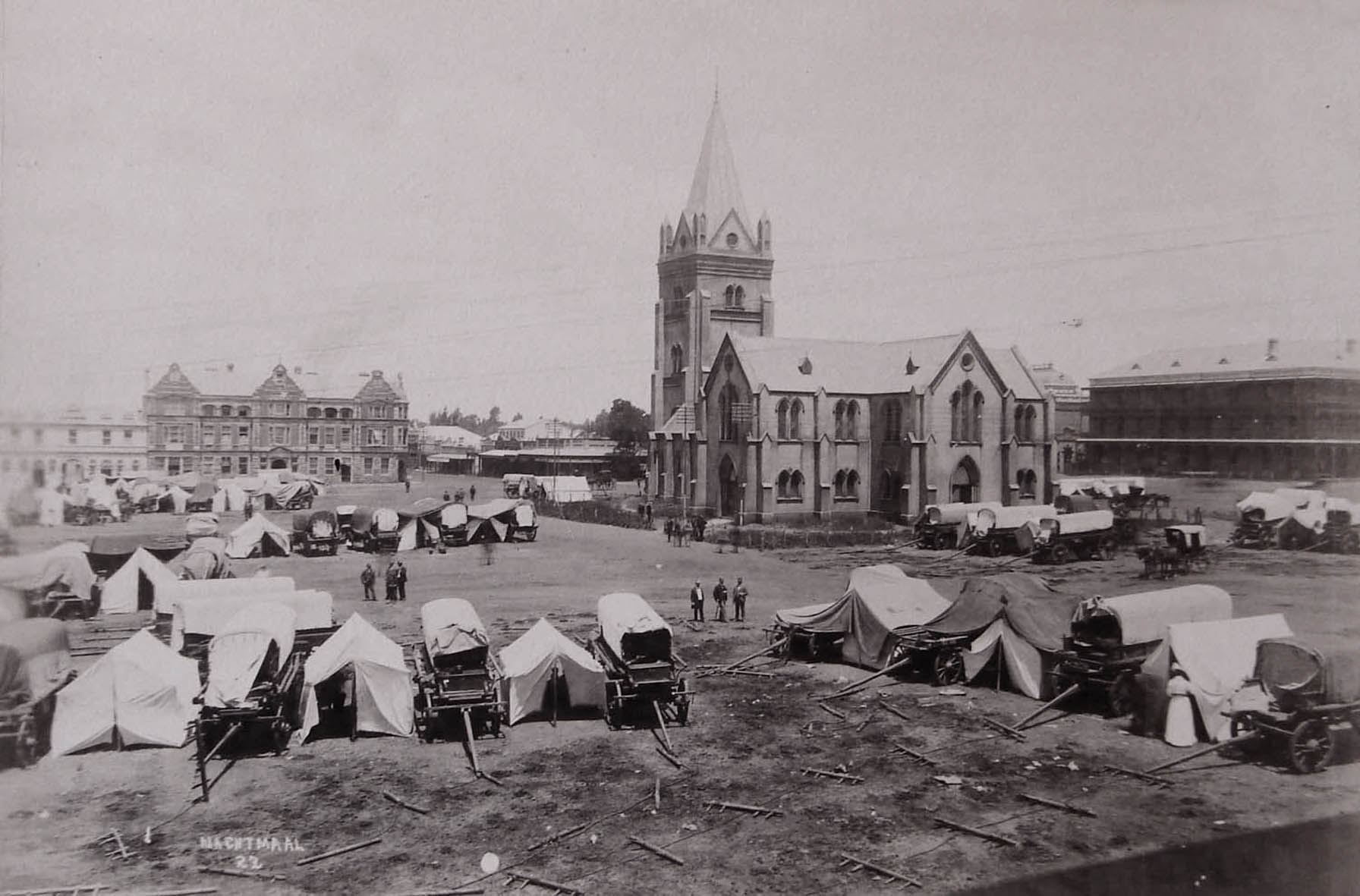
The Verenigde Kerk building (1885-1905) was the third to grace the square

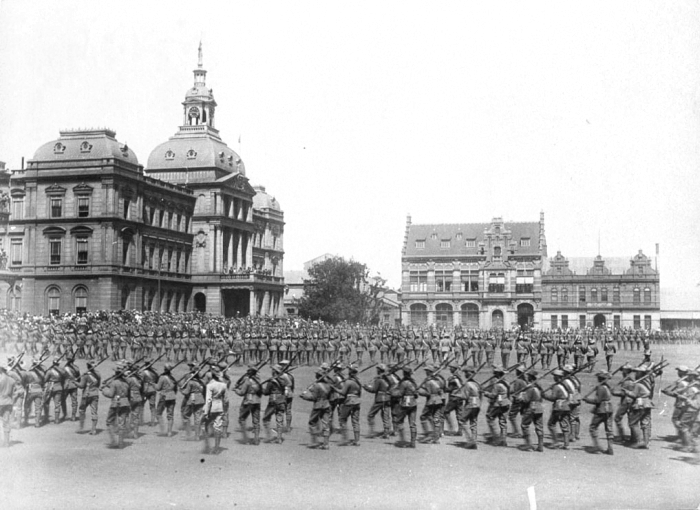
Boer commandos on the square during the Boer War, 1899

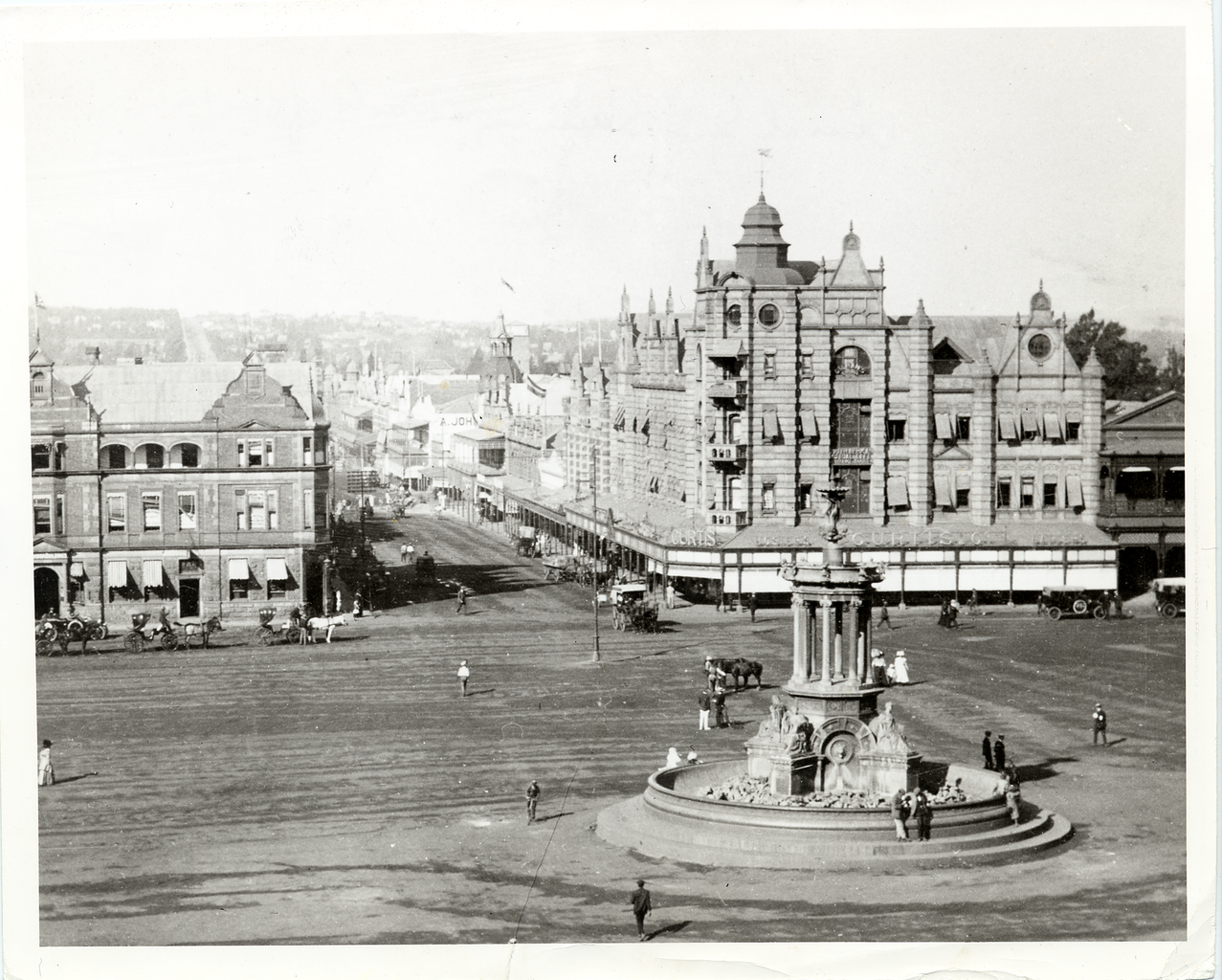
The square in 1905, adorned by the Sammy Marks Fountain

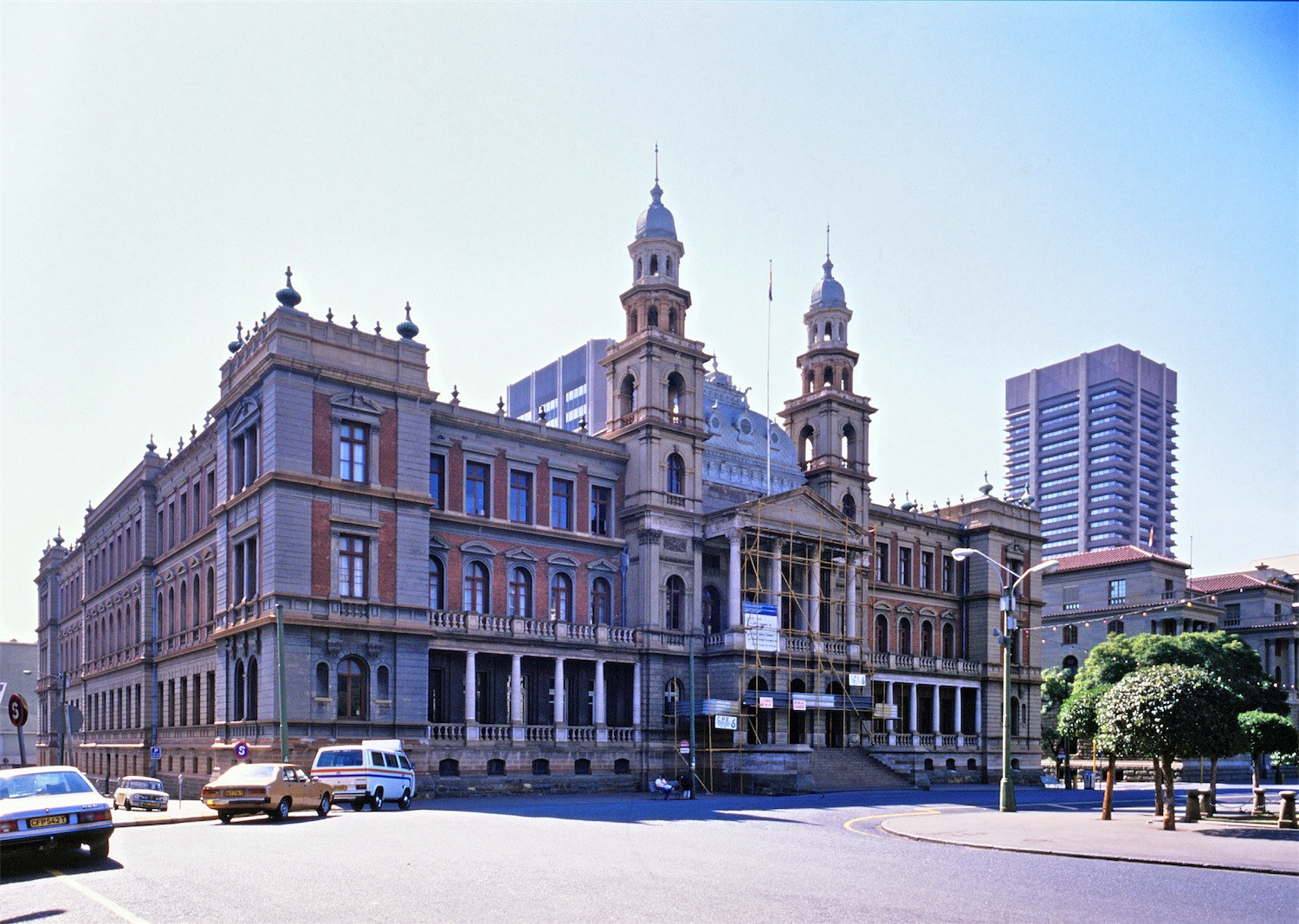
Palace of Justice, 1988

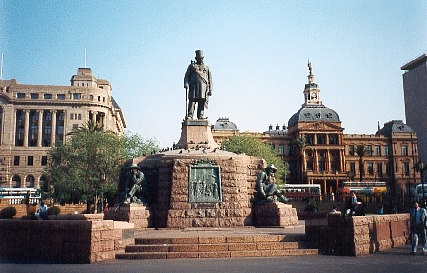
Paul Kruger statue, c. 2004
