= Elani Dekker =

South African actress

- Born: Pretoria, South Africa
- Years active: 2015–present
- Partner: Stiaan Smith
- Website: www.elanidekker.com

Elani Dekker is a South African actress, illustrator, and dancer. She was nominated for a SAFTA for her performance in the film Toorbos (2019). Her other films include Jou Romeo (2016), Liewe Lisa (2019), Silverton Siege (2022), and Die Bloedhonde (2024).

== Early life and education ==
Dekker was born in Pretoria. She attended an Afrikaans school. On a scholarship, she took the summer Acting on Film course at the New York Film Academy (NYFA) in July 2015. She also trained in ballet and worked as a production manager on the set of the film Sink. In 2021, Dekker obtained a diploma from the Interior Design Institute.

== Career ==
In 2016, Dekker made her feature film debut as Yvette Verwey in Jou Romeo. This was followed by further film roles as Older Zettie in Raaiselkind and Face in Vaselinetjie the following year. She made her television debut in the thirteenth season of the M-Net soap opera Binnelanders, which aired in 2018. She starred in the 2019 films Liewe Lisa as the titular character and Toorbos as Karoliena Kapp. For the latter, an adaptation of the novel by Dalene Matthee., Dekker received a SAFTA nomination for Best Actress in a Film. She also appeared in Vergeet my nie.

Dekker had her first solo art exhibition in February 2021, and her second Wild in September 2021. She joined the Society of Children's Book Writers and Illustrators (SCBWI). She returned to acting with a role as Christine in the 2022 Netflix historical action thriller film Silverton Siege. She co-wrote and starred in the 2024 murder mystery Die Bloedhonde as Katrien, directed by Stiaan Smith. She described it as a "deeply personal" film for Smith and herself.

== Personal life ==
As of 2020, Dekker lived in Robindale, a suburb of Randburg. She is engaged to Stiaan Smith, who directed Die Bloedhonde.

== Filmography ==
Year	Title	Role	Notes
2016	Jou Romeo	Yvette Verwey	
2017	Raaiselkind	Older Zettie	
2017	Vaselinetjie	Face	
2018	Binnelanders	Monique Roux	Season 13
2019	Liewe Lisa	Lisa de Wet	
2019	Toorbos	Karoliena Kapp	
2020	Vergeet my nie	Nicky van As	
2022	Silverton Siege	Christine	Netflix film
2024	Die Bloedhonde	Katrien	

=== Music videos ===
Year	Song	Artist	Notes
2016	"SY"	Die Heuwels Fantasties	
2016	"Ons op ons eie"	Loki Rothman	

== Stage ==
Year	Title	Role	Notes
2017	DEURnis		Aardklop
