= Sytze Wierda =

Dutch architect and engineer

Sytze Wopkes Wierda
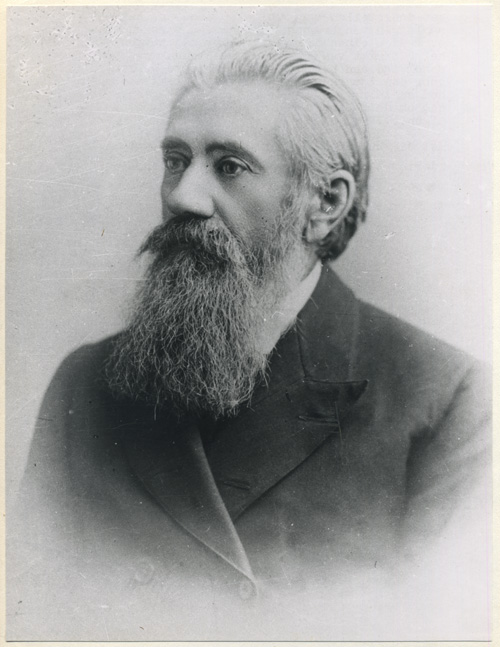
- Sytze Wopkes Wierda
- Born: 28 February 1839; Hemrik, Netherlands
- Died: 10 December 1911 (aged 72); Sea Point, South Africa
- Occupation: Architect

Sytze Wopkes Wierda (28 February 1839 in Hemrik, the Netherlands – 10 December 1911 in Sea Point, South Africa) was a Dutch architect and engineer who played an important role in the architecture of the South African Republic in the late 19th and early 20th centuries.

Wierda was trained as a carpenter before studying architecture. In his home country he was involved in the construction of railways and other public works, as well as designing several churches for the Christian Reformed Church, the protestant denomination of which he was a member. He was brought to the republic by State President Paul Kruger who was a great admirer of his work and wanted to establish a typically South African style of architecture with Dutch roots. His works include numerous official buildings and structures like post offices, police stations, gaols and bridges. Most of his buildings are located in Pretoria with the notable exception of the Rissik Street Post Office in Johannesburg. One of his most celebrated works is the Palace of Justice on Church Square in Pretoria. The South African community Wierdapark is named in his honor.

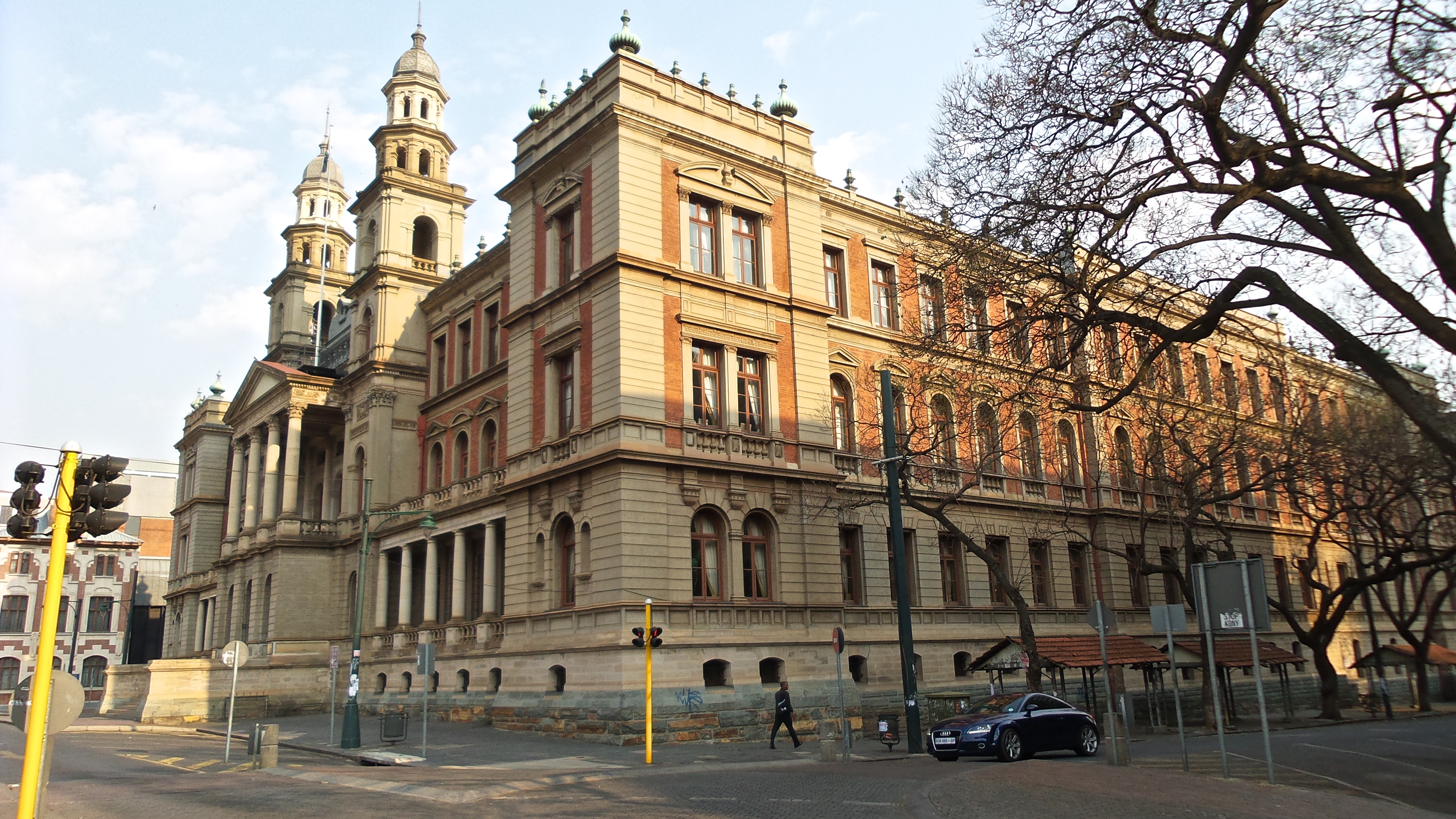
Palace of Justice (Pretoria)

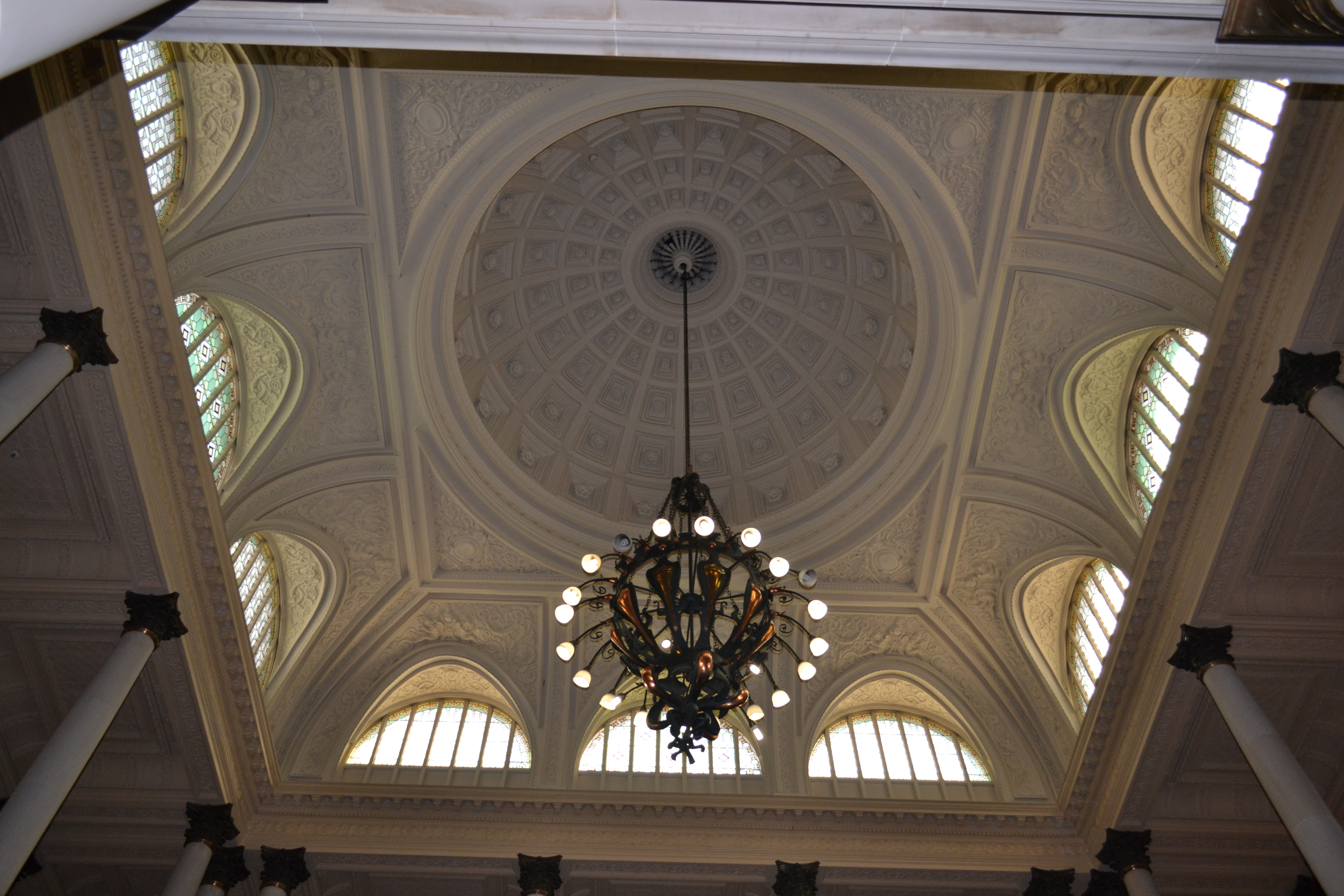
Palace of Justice (Pretoria)

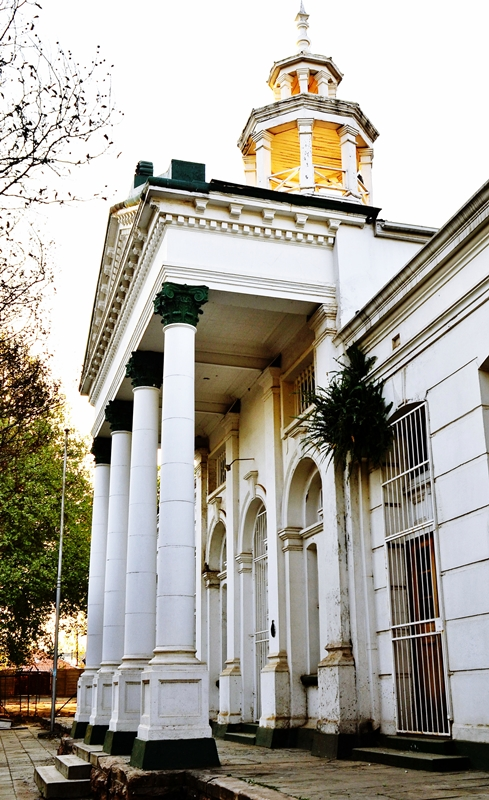
Old Magistrate's Office (Boksburg)

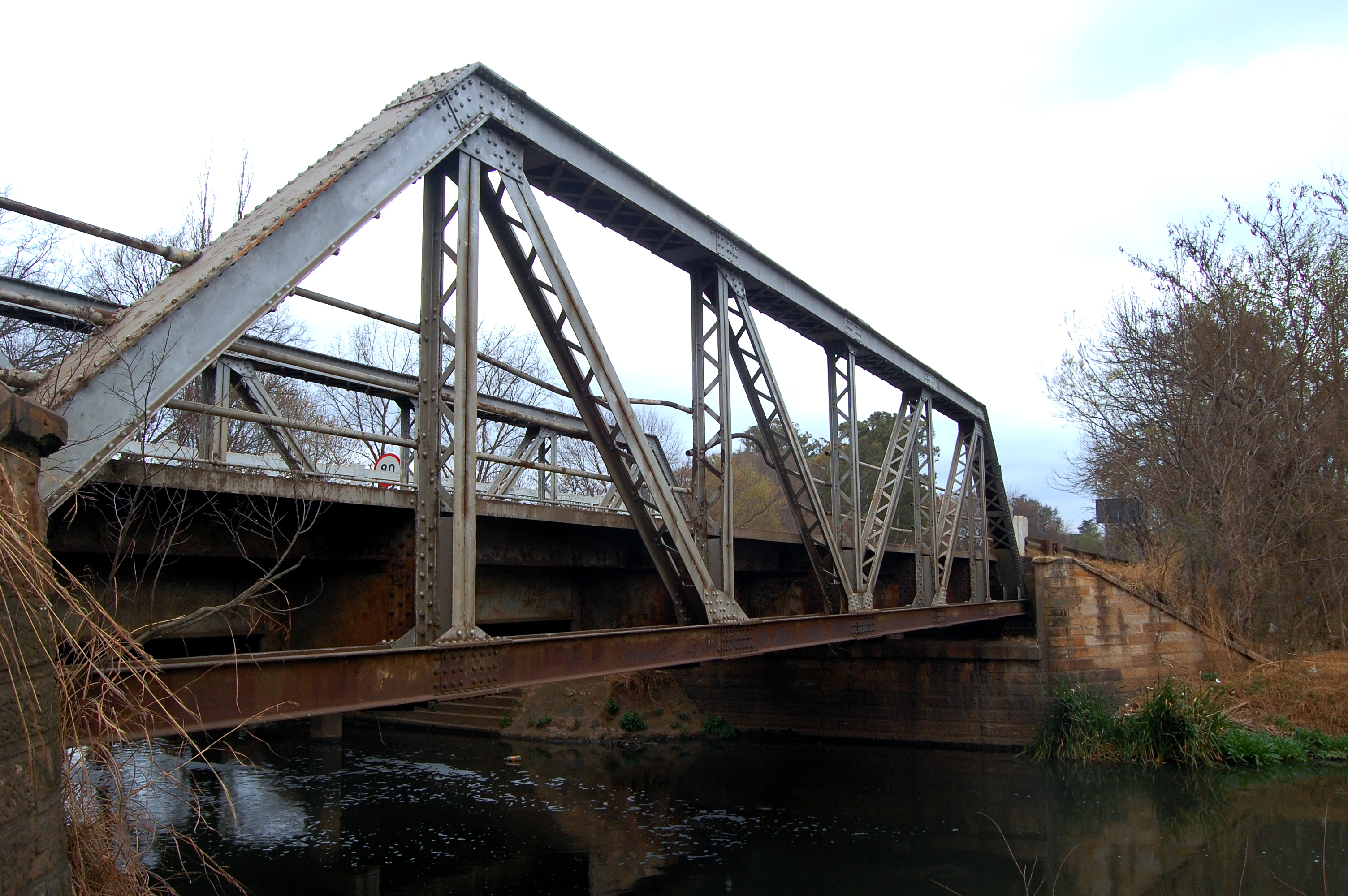
Wierda Bridge (Pretoria)
