= Hoare baronets of Barn Elms (1786) =

Escutcheon of the Hoare baronets of Barn Elms

The Hoare baronetcy, of Barn Elms in the County of Surrey, was created in the Baronetage of Great Britain on 27 June 1786 for Richard Hoare. He was the son of Sir Richard Hoare, Lord Mayor of London in 1745, and the great-grandson of Sir Richard Hoare, Lord Mayor of London in 1712 and the founder of the banking firm of C. Hoare & Co.

The 5th Baronet sat as Member of Parliament for Windsor 1865–6, and for Chelsea from 1868 to 1874.

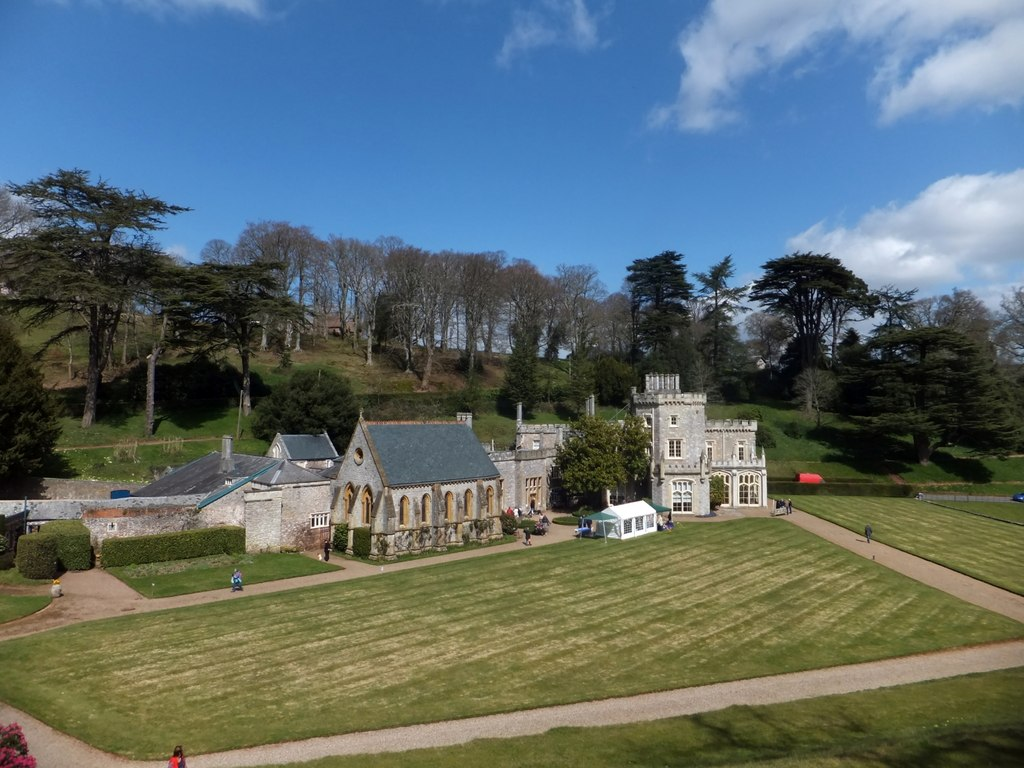
Luscombe Castle, 2013 photograph

The family seat was Stourhead in Wiltshire until 1946, when the 7th Baronet gave the house and grounds to the National Trust. From then it was Luscombe Castle, Dawlish, Devon, England.

== Hoare baronets, of Barn Elms (1786) ==
- Sir Richard Hoare, 1st Baronet (1735–1787)
- Sir Richard Colt Hoare, 2nd Baronet (1758–1838)
- Sir Henry Hugh Hoare, 3rd Baronet (1762–1841)
- Sir Hugh Richard Hoare, 4th Baronet (1787–1857)
- Sir Henry Ainslie Hoare, 5th Baronet (1824–1894)
- Sir Henry Hugh Arthur Hoare, 6th Baronet (1865–1947)
- Sir Peter William Hoare, 7th Baronet (1898–1973)
- Sir Peter Richard David Hoare, 8th Baronet (1932–2004)
- Sir David John Hoare, 9th Baronet (born 1935)

The heir apparent is the present holder's son Simon Merrik Hoare (born 1967).

== Notes ==
Baronetage of Great Britain
Preceded by Vane-Fletcher baronets	Hoare baronets of Barn Elms; 27 June 1786	Succeeded by Hunter-Blair baronets
