= Sir Henry Hugh Hoare, 3rd Baronet =

English banker

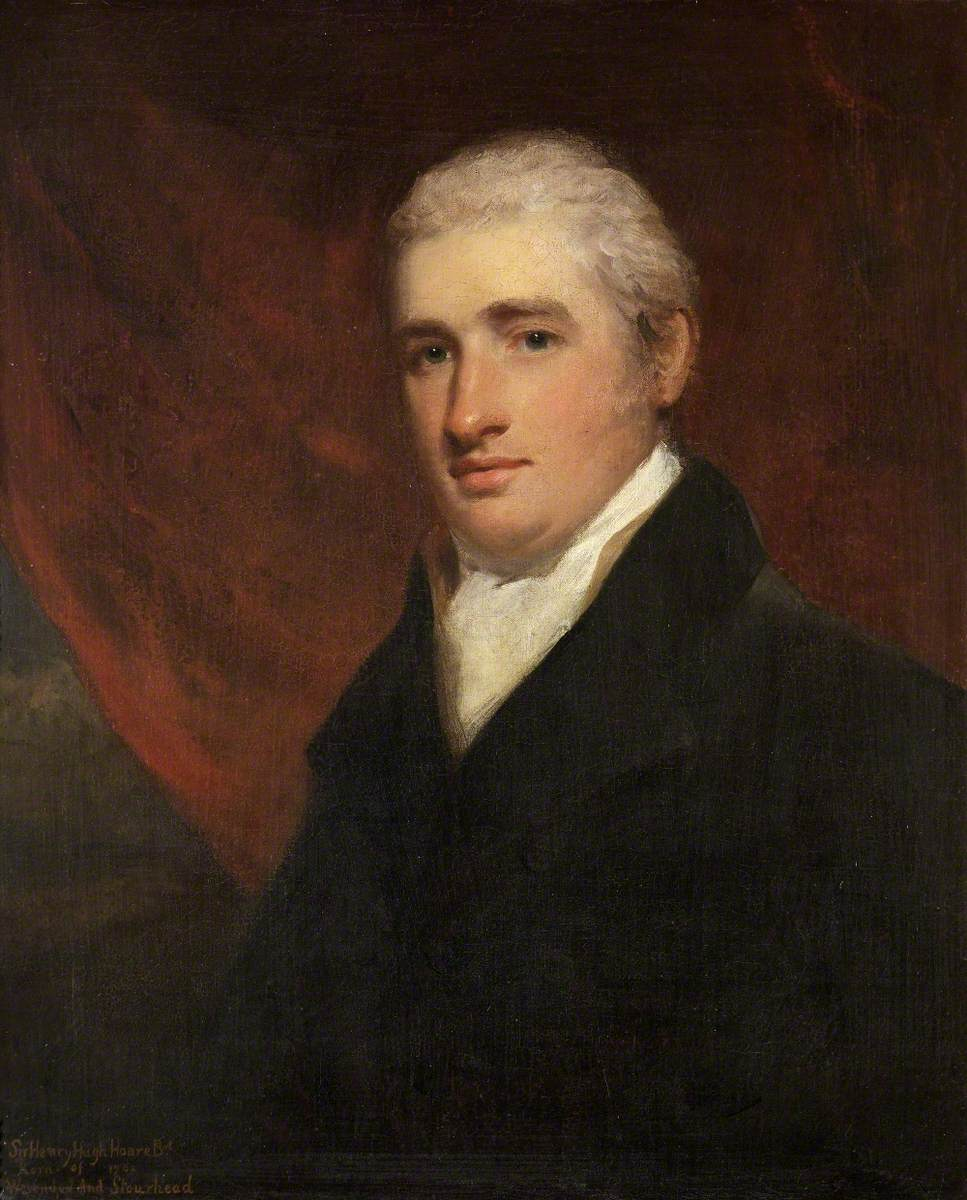
Henry Hugh Hoare, portrait in middle age

Sir Henry Hugh Hoare, 3rd Baronet (1762–1841) was an English banker, a partner in Hoare's Bank, with a particular interest in the affairs of the Church of England.

== Life ==
He was the son of Sir Richard Hoare, 1st Baronet and his second wife, Frances Ann Acland. Sir Richard Colt Hoare, 2nd Baronet (1758–1838) was his elder half-brother. He was born at Barn Elms. According to his obituary in the Gentleman's Magazine, he was known as Hugh. Charles Hoare was his younger brother. His sister Henrietta Anne married Sir Thomas Dyke Acland, 10th Baronet.

Hoare was elected Fellow of the Royal Society in 1784. He became a partner in the family bank in 1785. Henry Hoare of Mitcham Grove (1750–1828) became the head of the firm c.1788. On the death in 1787 of his father, Hoare had inherited the family house at Barn Elms, but he did not reside much there. It was sold in 1827, to the company constructing the Hammersmith Bridge.

In 1789 Hoare purchased a London house on St James's Square. His friend George Elphinstone Keith was married in 1808 from this house, to Hester Thrale.

In 1797 Hoare bought an estate at Wavendon, Buckinghamshire. The mansion house there had been in the Selby family for several generations, but had changed hands, and Hoare bought it from Lord Charles FitzRoy. He added further property. An improving farmer, Hoare was noted for his drainage and the use of the Scotch plough.

When Henry Hoare of Mitcham Grove died in 1828, Hugh Hoare succeeded him as senior partner of Hoare's Bank. New premises on Fleet Street, designed by Charles Parker, were opened in 1829, the work having been under the oversight of Henry's brother Charles.

On the death of the second baronet Richard in 1838, Hoare inherited the title, and the family estate at Stourhead in Wiltshire. He brought in the architect Charles Parker who had worked on the bank and added a portico to Stourhead House that had formed part of the original design.

Hoare died at Wavendon, in 1841.

== Anglican interests ==
High altar window of St Dunstan-in-the-West, London, given by the Hoare family

Hoare acted as treasurer to the Society for the Propagation of the Gospel in Foreign Parts.

The church in Fleet Street, St Dunstan-in-the-West, over the road from the bank, was rebuilt in the 1830s, and Hugh Hoare chaired the building committee. The Hoare brothers gave the new altar window, designed by Thomas Willement. In 1837 Hoare was a member of a committee of the Additional Curates' Society, chaired by Joshua Watson.

== Family ==
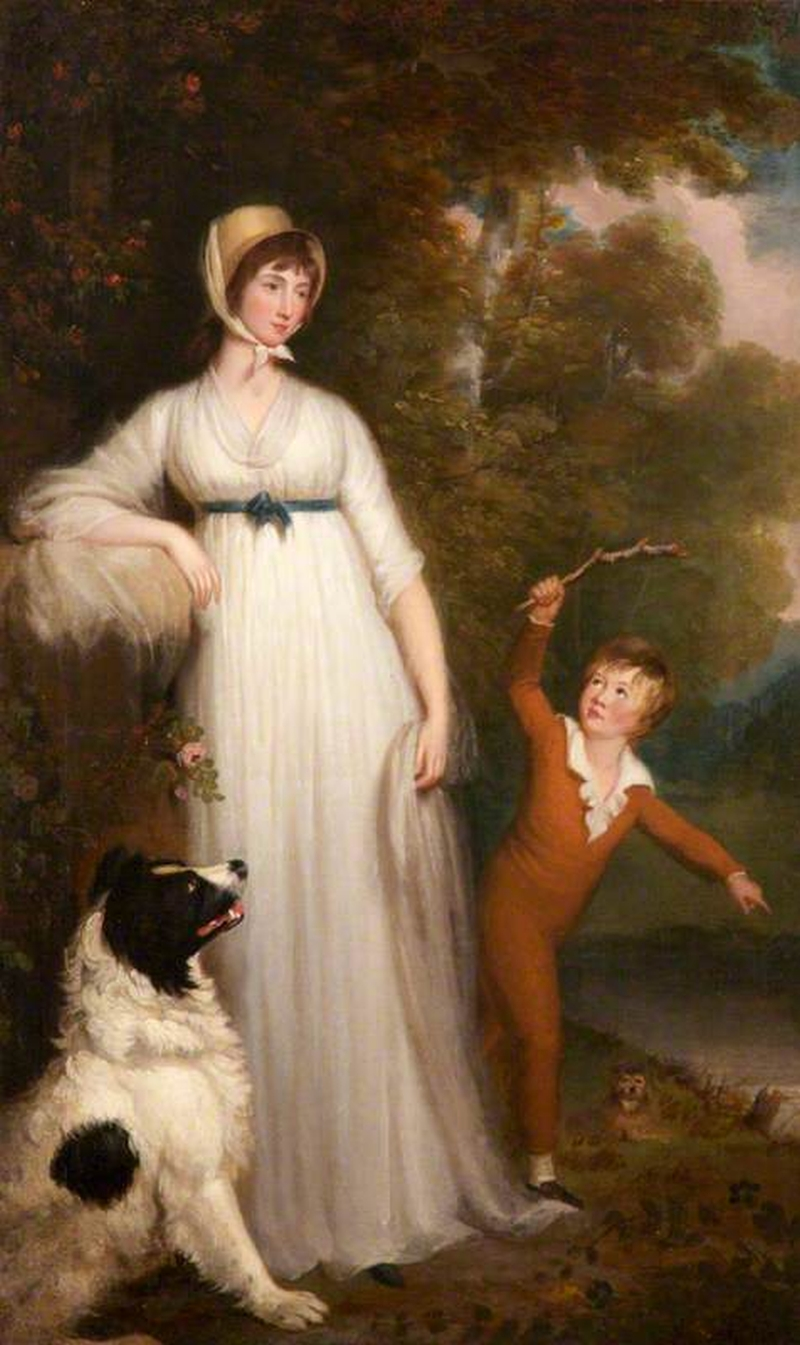
Maria Palmer Hoare, 1794 portrait with the future 4th Baronet

Hoare married in 1784 Maria Palmer Acland, daughter of Arthur Acland and his cousin, who survived him. They had 16 children.

The eldest son Hugh having died young, Hoare's heir and the 4th baronet was Hugh Richard Hoare, born 1787. He married Anne Tyrwhitt-Drake, daughter of Thomas Drake Tyrwhitt-Drake.

Other surviving children were:

- Henry Charles Hoare (born 1790), married in 1821 Anne Penelope, fourth daughter of George Ainslie, a widow. Sir Henry Hoare, 5th Baronet was their son.
- Richard Hoare (born 1793), naval officer, who married Matilda Fahie, daughter of William Charles Fahie.
- Henry Arthur Hoare (born 1804), an officer of the Bedfordshire Regiment. He married Julia Lucy Lane (died 1916). Sir Henry Hugh Arthur Hoare, 6th Baronet was their son.
- Henrietta Maria (born 1791).
- Julia (born 1800), married in 1827 John Hesketh Lethbridge, son of Sir Thomas Lethbridge, 2nd Baronet.
- Frances Ann (born 1801).

== Notes ==
Baronetage of Great Britain
Preceded by Richard Hoare	Baronet (of Barn Elms); 1838–1841	Succeeded by Hugh Hoare
