= Edward Ballard (disambiguation) =

Edward Ballard (1820–1897) was an English physician.

Edward Ballard may also refer to:

- Edward George Ballard (1791–1860), English writer
- Edward Goodwin Ballard (1910 - 1989), American philosopher
- Edward J. Ballard (c. 1790–1813), United States Navy officer
