= Sir Henry Hoare, 5th Baronet =

English banker and Liberal politician

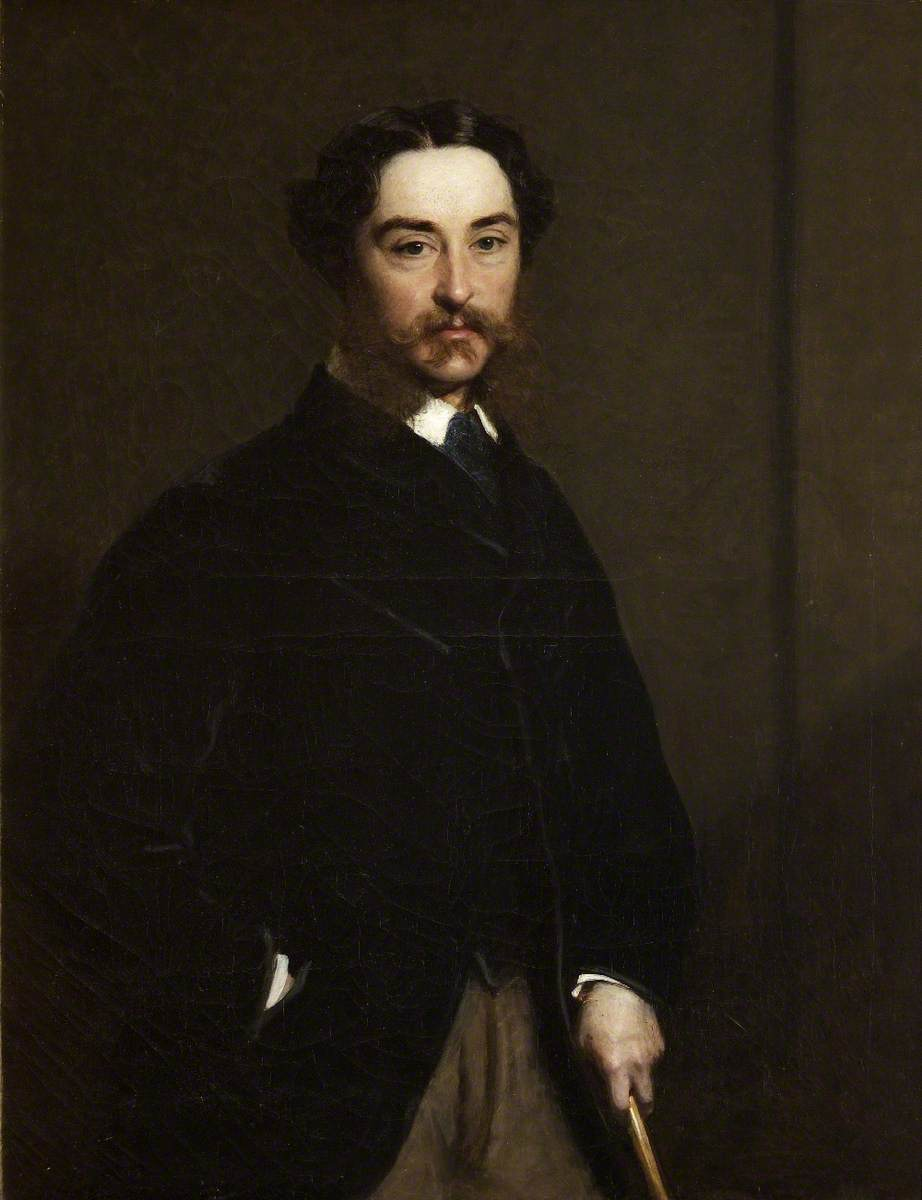
Sir Henry Hoare, 5th Baronet, 1860 portrait

Sir Henry Ainslie Hoare, 5th baronet DL (14 April 1824 – 7 July 1894) was an English banker and Liberal politician who sat in the House of Commons between 1866 and 1874.

== Life ==
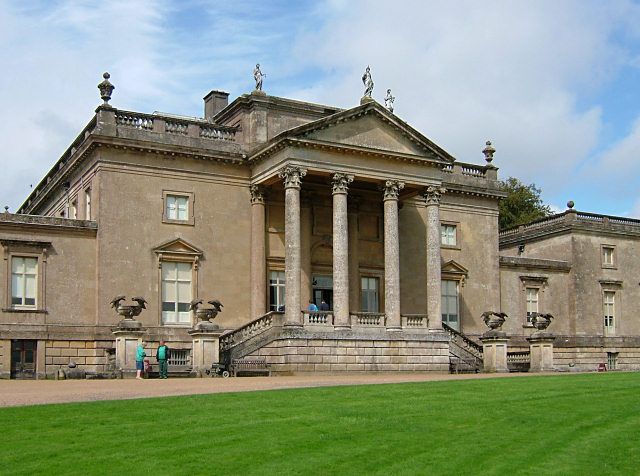
Stourhead House

Hoare was the son of Henry Charles Hoare, and his wife Anne Penelope Ainslie, daughter of General George Ainslie. He was educated at Eton College and St John's College, Cambridge before entering the family bank Messrs Hoare and Co. He succeeded his uncle Sir Hugh Richard Hoare, 4th Baronet in the baronetcy in 1857 and moved to Stourhead. He was a Justice of the Peace and Deputy Lieutenant for Somerset and Wiltshire.

In 1865, Hoare was elected Member of Parliament for Windsor but was unseated in 1866. At the 1868 general election, he was elected MP for Chelsea. He held the seat until 1874.

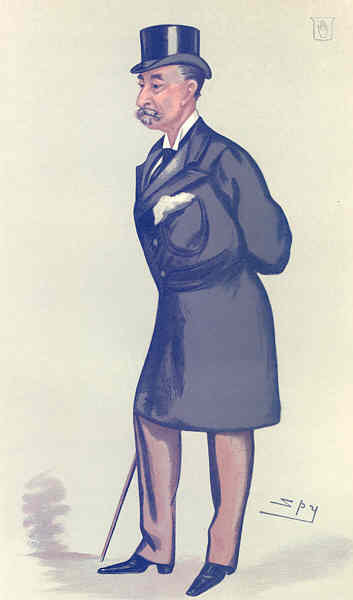
"reformed Radical" Hoare as caricatured by Spy (Leslie Ward) in Vanity Fair, February 1883

Hoare had a restless temperament and expensive tastes, including hunting and horse racing, which left him short of money. In 1883, during the agricultural depression, he had to sell at auction many of Stourhead's treasures, including Sir Richard Colt Hoare’s collection of books on British history and a series of watercolour paintings by Turner.

Hoare left Stourhead and lived in France in his later years, where he fell ill in 1894. He returned to London and died at the age of 70 at 12, West Eaton Place, Pimlico, and was buried at Stourton.

== Family ==
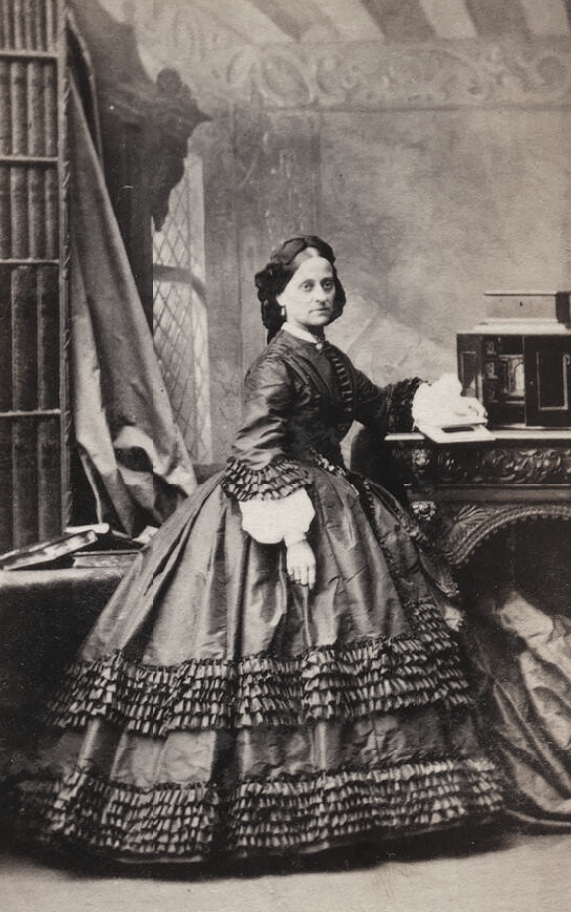
Augusta Frances, Lady Hoare, 1861 photograph

Hoare married Augusta Frances Clayton East, daughter of Sir East George Clayton East, in 1845. Their only son died in childhood, and the baronetcy passed to a cousin. Their daughter Augusta Frances Anne married, firstly in 1868, William John Nettleship Angerstein, son of William Angerstein, the marriage ending in divorce in 1887; and secondly in 1894 James St Aubyn Hastie of the Indian Army.

Parliament of the United Kingdom
| Preceded by William Vansittart; Richard Vyse | Member of Parliament for Windsor; 1865 – 1866; With: Henry Labouchère | Succeeded by Charles Edwards; Roger Eykyn |
| New constituency | Member of Parliament for Chelsea; 1865 – 1874; With: Sir Charles Dilke | Succeeded by Sir Charles Dilke; William Gordon |
Baronetage of Great Britain
| Preceded by Hugh Richard Hoare | Baronet (of Barn Elms); 1857–1894 | Succeeded by Henry Hoare |
