= Eddie Ballard =

Eddie Ballard may refer to:

- Eddie Ballard (cricketer)
- Eddie Ballard (politician)

== See also ==
- Edward Ballard (disambiguation)
