= Hugh Hoare =

Hugh Hoare may refer to:

- Hugh Hoare (Liberal politician) (1854–1929), British brewer and Liberal politician
- Sir Hugh Richard Hoare, 4th Baronet (1787–1857), English banker
