= Edward George Ballard =

Edward George Ballard (1791–1860) was an English miscellaneous writer.

== Biography ==
Ballard was born on 22 April 1791 in Islington, Middlesex, the son of Edward Ballard, an alderman of Salisbury, Wiltshire and Elizabeth, daughter of G. F. Benson of that city.

He obtained a situation in the Stamp Office in 1809, and, having resigned this appointment, entered the Excise Office, which he also left of his own accord in 1817 in which year he became a contributor to Woollers' Reasoner. The following year he married Mary Ann Shadgett (c. 1798–1820), and wrote several criticisms and verses for the Weekly Review, then edited by his brother-in-law, William Shadgett. He contributed to the Literary Chronicle and the Imperial Magazine under the signature E. G. B., and to the Literary Magnet and the World of Fashion under that of Γ. He published in 1825 a volume entitled A New Series of Original Poems and a few years after another entitled Microscopic Amusements.

He was exceedingly fond of research. Robert Benson, his cousin, and Henry Hatcher received no small help from him in writing their History of Salisbury (1843), which formed part of Hoare's Wiltshire. He helped John Gough Nichols in the works undertaken for the Camden Society. In 1848 he brought out some parts of a continuation of John Strype's Ecclesiastical Annals in a publication called the Surplice, but this paper and Ballard's scheme soon came to an end. He wrote occasionally in The Gentleman's Magazine, and in Notes and Queries. He died at Islington on 14 February 1860, leaving a son, Edward Ballard, a medical inspector and author of several medical works, and a daughter.
