= Sir Henry Hugh Arthur Hoare, 6th Baronet =

English landowner (1885–1947)

Sir Henry Hugh Arthur Hoare, 6th Baronet (19 November 1865 – 25 March 1947) was an English landowner, best known for his restoration of the country house at Stourhead in Wiltshire, following a fire in April 1902. Prior to his death he donated the house and gardens to the National Trust.

== Life ==
Hoare's parents were Henry Arthur Hoare and his wife Julia Lucy (née Lane); he was thus the grandson of Sir Henry Hugh Hoare, 3rd Baronet. He was educated at Harrow School, and later served in the 3rd Battalion, Bedfordshire Regiment.

In 1887, Henry Hoare married Alda Weston, whom he had known since childhood. Their only child, Henry Colt Arthur Hoare, known as Harry, was born in 1888. Harry joined the Dorset Yeomanry at the start of the First World War and died of wounds received while fighting in Egypt, in December 1917, leaving his father without an heir.

In 1910, Lady Alda made the acquaintance of the writer Thomas Hardy, who lived in Dorchester, in the neighbouring county of Dorset. She began a correspondence with both Hardy and his wife Emma, and the friendship continued after Emma died and he married Florence Dugdale; many of their letters are preserved in the archive at Stourhead. In 1915, Sir Henry served as High Sheriff of Wiltshire.

Sir Henry and his wife died on the same day, 25 March 1947, within six hours of one another. He was aged 81.

Peter William Hoare, grandson of Peter Merrick Hoare, inherited the baronetcy.

== Stourhead ==
Sir Henry inherited the baronetcy and the Stourhead estate from a cousin in 1894, by which time the house had lain empty for several years as his predecessor could not afford its upkeep. The family moved into the house in February 1895.

The quest for an heir to the baronetcy was worrying, particularly for Lady Alda Hoare who, being over 50, could not hope to have another child. There was also growing concern about the future of Stourhead. In 1920, a cousin, Henry Hoare (1866–1956) and his wife Lady Geraldine Mariana Hoare (died 1955) offered an invitation to Sir Henry and his wife to stay at their home, Ellisfield Manor, near Basingstoke. Later, their son, Henry Peregrine Rennie Hoare (1901–1981) reportedly "made a favourable impression at Stourhead" and wrote a book about the family's success in banking. Arrangements were made with the National Trust for Henry Peregrine Rennie Hoare and his family to live rent-free at Stourhead following the deaths of Sir Henry and Lady Hoare in 1947.

Baronetage of Great Britain
| Preceded by Henry Hoare | Baronet (of Barn Elms); 1894–1947 | Succeeded by Peter Hoare |
