= Edward Ballard =

British doctor

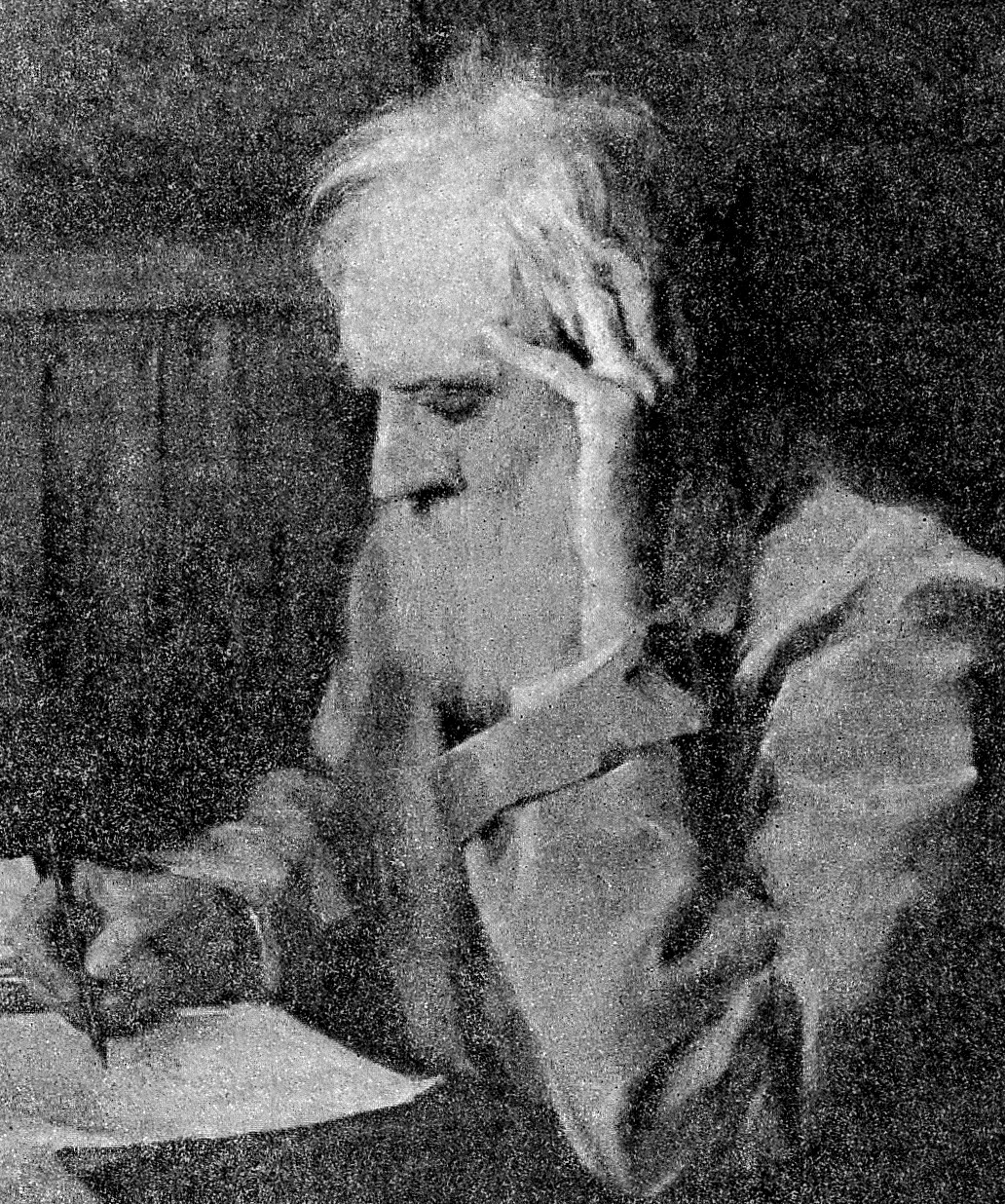
Edward Ballard, photograph of a painting by his daughter

Edward Ballard (15 April 1820 – 19 January 1897) was a 19th-century English physician, best known for his reports on the unsanitary conditions in which most of Victorian England lived.

Ballard was born in Islington, Middlesex, the son Edward George Ballard, the English writer, and Mary Ann Shadgett. He was educated at Islington Proprietary School and at University College, London, from which he received his doctorate in medicine in 1843.

Together with Alfred Baring Garrod, Ballard co-authored Elements of Materia Medica and Therapeutics, published in 1845, the first medical textbook on what is now known as clinical pharmacology. Admitted a member of the Royal College of Physicians and Fellow of the Royal Society, Ballard is best known for his work as the Medical Officer for Health at the Local Government Board, a position in which he wrote numerous reports on the unsanitary conditions in which the masses of Victorian England lived.

Ballard married, firstly, in 1846 Julia Hannah, daughter of Charles Huggons of London, by whom he had two sons and one daughter, and secondly, Emmeline, daughter of John Halse of London, by whom he had a son and a daughter, Robert and Alice.

== Bibliography ==
Ballard published several books and reports during his career. The most important of these are:

- Ballard, Edward and Garrod, Alfred Baring. Elements of Materia Medica and Therapeutics with Additions and Alterations by R. Eglesfeld Griffith. 1846.
- Ballard, Edward. Disasters from Vaccination. 1873, printed by The Mothers' Anti-Compulsory Vaccination League.
- Ballard, Edward. Report to the Local Government Board on the sanitary condition of Wolverhampton, 1874 {Wolverhampton Archives & Local Studies reference L628.}
- Ballard, Edward. Report to the Local Government Board on an outbreak of enteric fever at Tolcarne Head, Newquay, Cornwall, and generally on the sanitary condition ... of the Urban Sanitary District of Newquay. 1880, printed by George E. Eyre and William Spottiswoode for H.M.S.O.
- Ballard, Edward. Report to the Local Government Board upon an epidemic outbreak of enteric fever in the village of Millbrook, in the Rural Sanitary District of St. German's, Cornwall. 1880, printed by George E Eyre and William Spottiswoode for H.M.S.O.
- Ballard, Edward. Report to the Local Government Board upon the Causation of the Annual Mortality from "Diarrhoea" Which is Observed Principally in the Summer Season of the Year, 1889, (draft only as Ballard died prior to finalising it.)
