= Sir Hugh Richard Hoare, 4th Baronet =

English banker

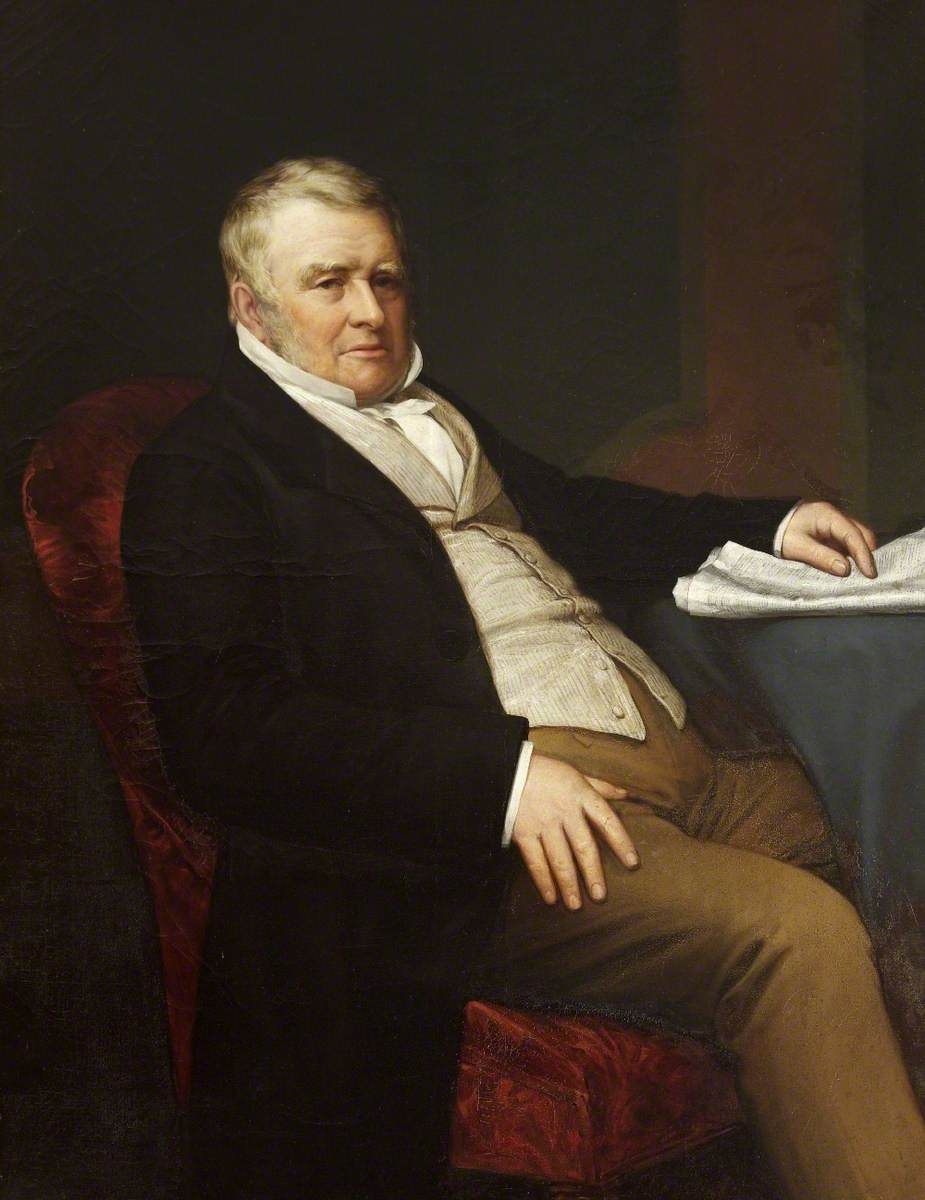
Sir Hugh Richard Hoare, 4th Baronet

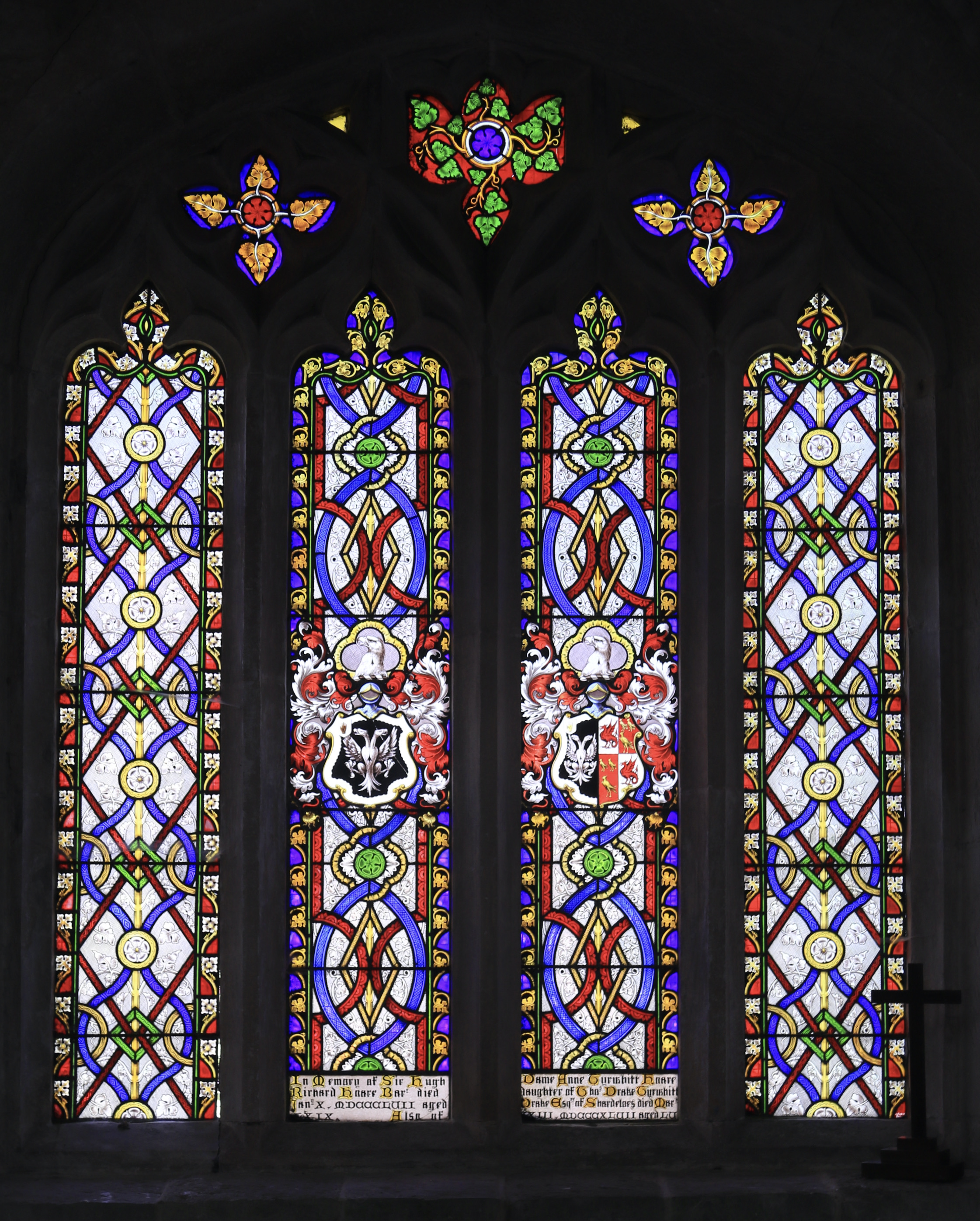
Stained-glass window in memory of Hugh Richard Hoare in St Peter's Church, Stourton

Sir Hugh Richard Hoare, 4th Baronet (27 November 1787 - 10 January 1857) was an English banker, a partner in Hoare's Bank.

He was the son of Sir Henry Hugh Hoare, 3rd Baronet and Maria Palmer Acland, daughter of Arthur Acland.

He married Anne Tyrwhitt-Drake, daughter of Thomas Drake Tyrwhitt-Drake. Anne died on 23 March 1847 and the marriage produced no children, so on his death the title went to Henry Ainslie Hoare, son of his brother, Henry Charles, who had died in 1852.

He inherited the baronetcy aged 54 on 17 August 1841. In 1854 retired from his position at Hoare's Bank and retired to Stourhead with sufficient income to improve his estates comprising 11,000 acres. He planted many trees on the estate including Douglas Fir and Western Hemlock.

Baronetage of Great Britain
Preceded by Henry Hugh Hoare	Baronet (of Barn Elms); 1841–1857	Succeeded by Henry Ainslie Hoare
