= Sir Richard Hoare, 2nd Baronet =

British antiquarian and archaeologist (1758–1838)

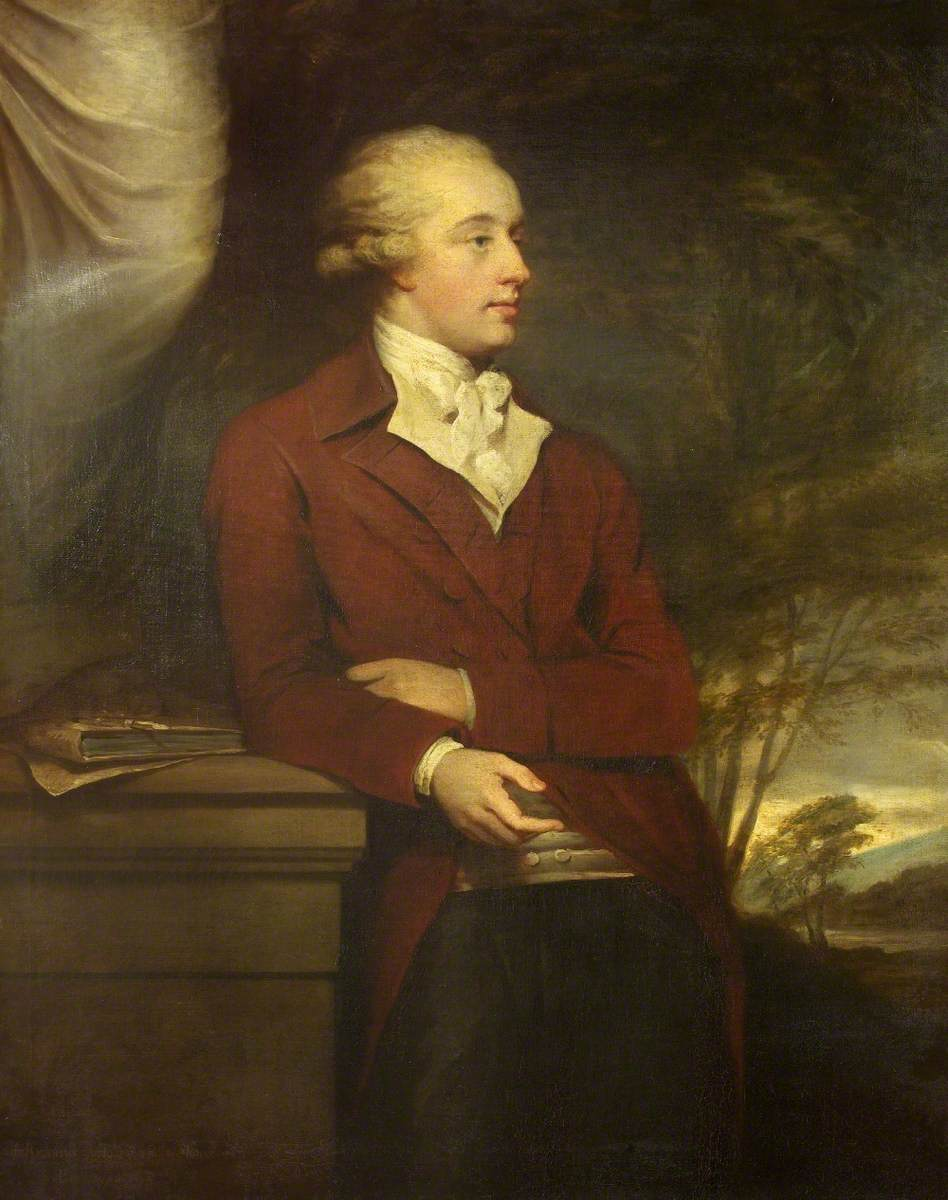
Sir Richard Colt Hoare, 2nd Baronet

Sir Richard Colt Hoare, 2nd Baronet FRS (9 December 1758 – 19 May 1838) was an English antiquarian, archaeologist, artist, and traveller of the 18th and 19th centuries, the first major figure in the detailed study of the history of his home county of Wiltshire.

== Career and personal life ==
Hoare was born in Barnes, Surrey, and was descended from Sir Richard Hoare, the Lord Mayor of London, the founder of the family banking business, Hoare's Bank. His parents were Sir Richard Hoare, 1st Baronet, and Anne Hoare. His half sister was Henrietta Anne Hoare, who was also a talented artist.

He was educated at Mr. Devis's prep school in Wandsworth and afterwards at Samuel Glasse's school at Greenford. He was also taught the Classics by the Rev. Joseph Eyre.

In 1783 Hoare married Hester, daughter of William Lyttelton, 1st Baron Lyttelton. In 1785 he inherited the large Stourhead estate in Wiltshire from his grandfather, Henry Hoare the Younger, which enabled him to pursue his interests, including the archaeological studies for which he had already shown an inclination. His inheritance came with the condition that he left the family's banking business, since his grandfather wished to ensure the survival of the estate if the family's other business suffered eventual hardships. In 1785, Hoare's wife died following the birth of their second child, who also died. Having lost his wife and previous career, he embarked on a continental tour to France, Italy, and Switzerland. In 1786 he purchased Glastonbury Tor and funded the restoration of the church tower on it.

He succeeded to the baronetcy in 1787, and in 1788 made a second continental tour, the record of his travels appearing in 1815 and 1819 under the titles Recollections Abroad and A Classical Tour through Italy and Sicily. He took numerous views during his travels in the form of sketches from which he later produced mainly sepia wash drawings, along with a smaller number of watercolours. His tutor John 'Warwick' Smith, and the painter Francis Nicholson, were also commissioned to produce coloured reductions from some of his continental sketches. Bound in volumes, many of these were dispersed in the Stourhead sales of the 1880s.

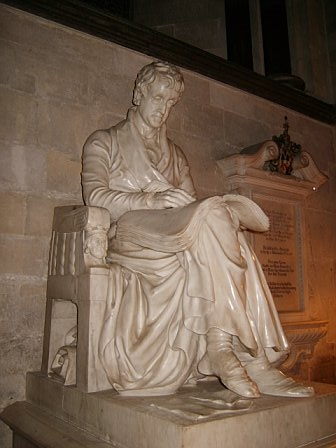
Monument to Sir Richard Colt Hoare in Salisbury Cathedral

A journey through Wales was followed by a translation of the Itinerarium Cambriae and of the Descriptio Cambriae of Gerald of Wales, with Hoare adding notes and a life of Gerald to his translation. This work was first published in 1804, and was subsequently revised by Thomas Wright (1810–1877) in 1863. Hoare's further Tour in Ireland was published in 1807.

Hoare was elected a Fellow of the Royal Society in 1792 and was also a Fellow of the Society of Antiquaries of London. He was appointed High Sheriff of Wiltshire for 1805. In 1825, Hoare donated his collection of Italian works on topography and history to the British Museum.

Sir Richard Colt Hoare was an avid plant collector and loved Pelargoniums and Rhododendrons.

== Death ==
He died at Stourhead in 1838. His mausoleum in the churchyard of St Peter's in Stourton, the estate village, is under a pinnacled Gothic canopy designed by John Pinch the Elder.

== Contributions to archaeology ==
The first recorded excavations at Stonehenge were made by William Cunnington and Richard Colt Hoare in 1798 and again in 1810. They dug around a fallen trilithon and a fallen slaughter stone, and discovered that they had once stood up. Colt Hoare excavated 379 barrows on Salisbury Plain as well as identifying many other sites in the area, publishing and classifying his findings. However, as the three-age system had not yet been introduced he was unable to date his finds and was therefore at a disadvantage when trying to interpret them. His most important book, The Ancient History of Wiltshire, outlined his findings; this work was first published in five parts from 1810 to 1821 for binding in two volumes. He also sponsored and contributed significantly to the 11 volumes of The History of Modern Wiltshire (1822–1844).

== Publications ==
- Journal of a tour in Ireland, A.D. 1806 (1807)
- A Catalogue of Books Relating to the History and Topography of Italy (1812)
- The History of Ancient Wiltshire, Vol. 1 and 2 (1812)
- A Tour Through the Island of Elba (1814)
- Hints to travellers in Italy (1815)
- Recollections abroad, during the years 1790 (1817)
- A Classical Tour Through Italy and Sicily (1819) – vol1 – vol2
- Repertorium Wiltonense. Printed with a view to facilitate inquiry into the topography and biography of Wiltshire (1821) OCLC 560823665
- A Letter, Stating the True Site of the Ancient Colony of Camulodunum (1827)
- The Historical Works of Giraldus Cambrensis (1905), includes Hoare's translation

== Notes ==
Baronetage of Great Britain
Preceded by Richard Hoare	Baronet (of Barn Elms); 1787–1838	Succeeded by Henry Hugh Hoare
