= Hoare baronets =

Set index for Hoare baronets

There have been four baronetcies created for people with the surname Hoare, one in the Baronetage of Ireland, one in the Baronetage of Great Britain and two in the Baronetage of the United Kingdom. As of 2026 two of the titles are extant.

- Hoare baronets of Annabella (1784)
- Hoare baronets of Barn Elms (1786)
- Hoare baronets of Sidestrand Hall (1899): see Viscount Templewood
- Hoare baronets of Fleet Street (1962): see Sir Frederick Hoare, 1st Baronet (1913–1986)
