= 2024 United States House of Representatives elections in Ohio =

- November 5, 2024

All 15 Ohio seats to the United States House of Representatives
	Majority party	Minority party
Party	Republican	Democratic
Last election	10	5
Seats won	10	5
Popular vote	3,104,290	2,382,078
Percentage	56.57%	43.43%
Swing	▲0.14%	▼0.14%

Republican
50–60%
60–70%
70–80%
80–90%
Democratic
40–50%
50–60%
60–70%
70–80%

The 2024 United States House of Representatives elections in Ohio were held on November 5, 2024, to elect the fifteen U.S. representatives from the state of Ohio, one from each of the state's congressional districts. The elections coincided with the 2024 U.S. presidential election, other elections to the House of Representatives, an election to the United States Senate, and various state and local elections. The primary elections took place on March 19, 2024.

== Background ==
During the 2020 redistricting cycle, the Ohio State Supreme Court ruled that the congressional district maps enacted by the Ohio Redistricting Commission were illegal gerrymanders that unduly favored Republicans, violating the Constitution of Ohio. Nevertheless, the 2022 elections took place using those districts, as the Court determined that it did not have the authority to impose a new map itself. It ultimately dismissed the case, ending any possibility that the maps would be redrawn for the 2024 elections.

== Overview ==
Both Democrats and Republicans held their ground in the election, securing every seat they won in 2022. Republicans performed the best in the 2nd district, which has the state's highest percentage of white voters. It was also Donald Trump's strongest in the presidential election; however, Representative-elect David Taylor still outran him by 0.2%. Conversely, Democrats performed the strongest in the Black-plurality 11th district, which was also Kamala Harris's best.

Democrats improved (Note: As candidates not affiliated with either of the two major parties participated in elections in both 2022 and 2024, two-party margin swing is used as a measure of improvement) on their 2022 results in ten districts, while Republicans gained ground in the other five: OH-05, OH-07, OH-09, OH-13 and OH-14. Republicans made a large gain in OH-09, where they slashed Democrats' lead from 13.2% to a tiny 0.7% but failed to flip the district. Journalists attributed this result to Tom Pruss, the Libertarian candidate.

District	Rep., #	Rep., %	Dem., #	Dem., %	Elected
1st	177,993	45.42%	213,916	54.58%	Greg Landsman
2nd	268,211	73.56%	96,401	26.44%	David Taylor
3rd	100,355	29.26%	242,632	70.74%	Joyce Beatty
4th	273,297	68.46%	125,905	31.54%	Jim Jordan
5th	255,633	67.51%	123,024	32.49%	Bob Latta
6th	245,860	66.74%	122,515	33.26%	Michael Rulli
7th	204,494	51.08%	144,613	36.12%	Max Miller
8th	237,503	62.81%	140,625	37.19%	Warren Davidson
9th	178,716	47.63%	181,098	48.27%	Marcy Kaptur
10th	213,695	57.64%	145,420	39.22%	Mike Turner
11th	59,394	19.64%	236,883	78.33%	Shontel Brown
12th	260,450	68.51%	119,738	31.49%	Troy Balderson
13th	188,924	48.89%	197,466	51.11%	Emilia Sykes
14th	243,427	63.42%	140,431	36.58%	David Joyce
15th	196,338	56.46%	151,411	43.54%	Mike Carey

Swing and two-party margin swing compared to 2022

== District 1 ==
2024 Ohio's 1st congressional district election
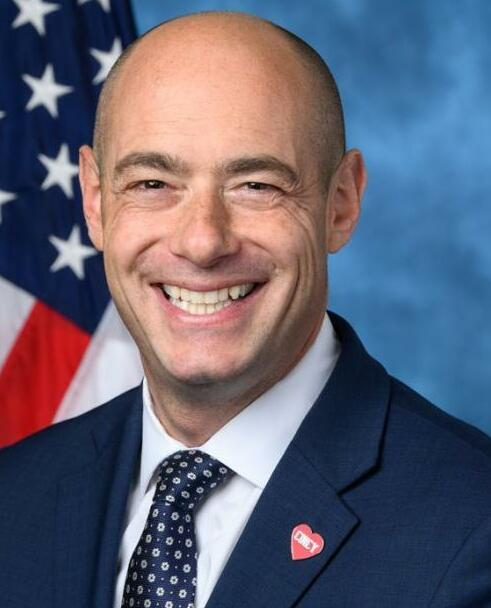

Nominee	Greg Landsman	Orlando Sonza
Party	Democratic	Republican
Popular vote	213,916	177,993
Percentage	54.58%	45.42%
- Landsman: 50–60% 60–70% 70–80% 80–90% ≥90% Sonza: 50–60% 60–70% 70–80% 80–90%
U.S. Representative before election
Greg Landsman
Democratic
Elected U.S. Representative
Greg Landsman
Democratic

The 1st district is based in the city of Cincinnati, stretching northward to Warren County. The incumbent was Democrat Greg Landsman, who flipped the district and was elected with 52.76% of the vote in 2022. He was re-elected in 2024.

=== Democratic primary ===
==== Nominee ====
- Greg Landsman, incumbent U.S. representative

==== Endorsements ====
Greg Landsman

Political parties

- Ohio Democratic Party

Organizations

- AIPAC
- Asian American Action Fund
- Bend the Arc
- Brady PAC
- Council for a Livable World
- Democratic Majority for Israel
- End Citizens United
- Everytown for Gun Safety Action Fund
- Giffords
- Humane Society Legislative Fund
- Jewish Democratic Council of America
- Joint Action Committee for Political Affairs
- League of Conservation Voters
- NARAL Pro-Choice America
- Planned Parenthood Action Fund
- Population Connection Action Fund
- Pro-Israel America
- Sierra Club

Labor unions

- National Education Association
- Ohio Federation of Teachers (post-primary)

==== Fundraising ====
Campaign finance reports as of February 28, 2024
Candidate	Raised	Spent	Cash on hand
Greg Landsman (D)	$1,802,063	$489,973	$1,380,138
Source: Federal Election Commission

=== Results ===
Democratic primary results
Party	Candidate	Votes	%
Democratic	Greg Landsman (incumbent)	28,025	100.0
Total votes		28,025	100.0

=== Republican primary ===
==== Nominee ====
- Orlando Sonza, executive director of the Hamilton County Veterans Service and nominee for SD-09 in 2022

==== Declined ====
- Tom Brinkman, former state representative
- Steve Chabot, former U.S. representative
- Amy Murray, former Cincinnati city councilor

==== Endorsements ====
Orlando Sonza

U.S. senators

- JD Vance, Ohio (2023–present)

Organizations

- Americans for Prosperity
- Congressional Leadership Fund (post-primary)

==== Fundraising ====
Campaign finance reports as of February 28, 2024
Candidate	Raised	Spent	Cash on hand
Orlando Sonza (R)	$191,055	$94,082	$96,972
Source: Federal Election Commission

=== Results ===
Republican primary results
Party	Candidate	Votes	%
Republican	Orlando Sonza	43,554	100.0
Total votes		43,554	100.0

=== General election ===
==== Predictions ====
Source	Ranking	As of
Cook Political Report	Likely D	March 5, 2024
Inside Elections	Solid D	October 10, 2024
Sabato's Crystal Ball	Likely D	February 28, 2024
Elections Daily	Likely D	February 5, 2024
CNalysis	Solid D	March 12, 2024

==== Results ====
2024 Ohio's 1st congressional district election
Party	Candidate	Votes	%
Democratic	Greg Landsman (incumbent)	213,916	54.58%
Republican	Orlando Sonza	177,993	45.42%
Total votes		391,909	100.0%
Democratic hold			

==== By county ====
County	Greg Landsman Democratic		Orlando Sonza Republican		Margin		Total
County	#	%	#	%	#	%	Total
Hamilton	165,300	64.74%	90,003	35.24%	75,297	29.49%	255,303
Warren	48,616	35.59%	87,990	64.41%	−39,374	−28.82%	136,606
Totals	213,916	54.58%	177,993	45.42%	35,923	9.17%	391,909

== District 2 ==
2024 Ohio's 2nd congressional district election
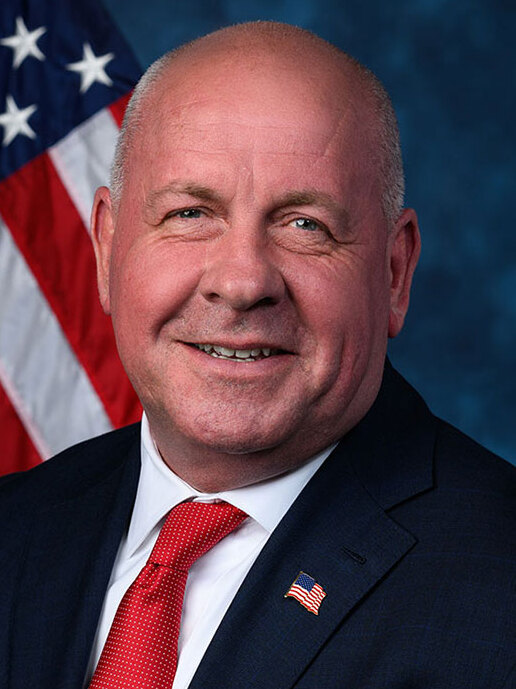

Nominee	David Taylor	Samantha Meadows
Party	Republican	Democratic
Popular vote	268,211	96,401
Percentage	73.56%	26.44%
- Taylor: 60–70% 70–80% 80–90% Meadows: 50–60% 60–70%
U.S. Representative before election
Brad Wenstrup
Republican
Elected U.S. Representative
David Taylor
Republican

The 2nd district takes in eastern Cincinnati and its suburbs, including Loveland, and stretches eastward along the Ohio River. The incumbent was Republican Brad Wenstrup, who was re-elected with 74.50% of the vote in 2022. Wenstrup did not run for reelection. David Taylor was nominated in the Republican primary in March 2024. Taylor was elected in 2024.

=== Republican primary ===
==== Nominee ====
- David Taylor, attorney and concrete company owner

==== Eliminated in primary ====
- Niraj Antani, state senator
- Kim Georgeton, chair of Moms for Liberty Hamilton County
- Phil Heimlich, former Hamilton County commissioner and candidate for the 8th district in 2022
- Ron Hood, former state representative, candidate for the 18th district in 2010, candidate for the 15th district in 2021, and candidate for governor in 2022
- Tom Hwang, investment manager and candidate for the 15th district in 2021
- Larry Kidd, opioid addiction nonprofit chair and former vice chair of the Jackson County Republican Party
- Derek Myers, news site publisher
- Tim O'Hara, retail and restaurant franchise owner
- Charles Tassell, chair of the Clermont County Republican Party
- Shane Wilkin, state senator

==== Withdrawn ====
- Brad Wenstrup, incumbent U.S. representative

==== Declined ====
- Jay Edwards, state representative
- Brian Stewart, state representative

==== Endorsements ====
Niraj Antani

Organizations

- Hindu American PAC
David Taylor

State representatives

- Mark Johnson, HD-92 (2021–present)

Organizations

- Clermont County Republican Party
Phil Heimlich

U.S. representatives

- Adam Kinzinger, IL-16 (Note: Numbered as the 11th district prior to the 2010 redistricting cycle) (2011–2023)

Individuals

- Joe Wessels, former Democratic candidate for this district
Ron Hood

U.S. representatives

- Josh Brecheen, OK-02 (2023–present)
Larry Kidd

Organizations

- United States Chamber of Commerce

County parties

- Scioto County Republican Party
Tim O'Hara

Individuals

- Vivek Ramaswamy, pharmaceutical executive and 2024 Republican presidential candidate

Organizations

- With Honor Fund
Shane Wilkin

U.S. representatives

- Mike Carey, OH-15 (2021–present)

Organizations

- Ohio Right to Life

==== Fundraising ====
Campaign finance reports as of February 28, 2024
Candidate	Raised	Spent	Cash on hand
Niraj Antani (R)	$671,393	$608,939	$62,454
Kim Georgeton (R)	$32,929	$26,183	$6,745
Phil Heimlich (R)	$142,575 (Note: $101,504 of this total was self-funded by Heimlich)	$121,415	$21,159
Ron Hood (R)	$115,100	$36,890	$78,209
Tom Hwang (R)	$254,000 (Note: $250,000 of this total was self-funded by Hwang)	$203,111	$51,388
Larry Kidd (R)	$1,433,547 (Note: $1,280,000 of this total was self-funded by Kidd)	$1,326,414	$107,133
Tim O'Hara (R)	$1,352,225 (Note: $1,165,000 of this total was self-funded by O'Hara)	$828,056	$524,169
Derek Myers (R) (Note: Did not file for pre-primary deadline)	$20,510 (Note: $18,000 of this total was self-funded by Myers)	$14,547	$14,927
Charles Tassell (R)	$114,002 (Note: $5,000 of this total was self-funded by Tassell)	$88,670	$25,331
David Taylor (R)	$1,771,542 (Note: $1,700,000 of this total was self-funded by Taylor)	$1,296,252	$475,290
Shane Wilkin (R)	$145,716	$79,253	$66,462
Source: Federal Election Commission

=== Results ===
Taylor won the primary with a little more than a quarter of the vote, while O'Hara finished in a close second. In total, five candidates both got more than 5% of the vote and carried at least one county. Kidd won five counties, earning his best result in his home, Jackson County.

Results by county: Taylor–30–40% Taylor–40–50% O'Hara–20–30% O'Hara–50–60% Kidd–20–30% Kidd–30–40% Kidd–40–50% Kidd–50–60% Wilkin–20–30% Wilkin–30–40% Wilkin–40–50% Hood–30–40%

Republican primary results
Party	Candidate	Votes	%
Republican	David Taylor	26,247	25.5
Republican	Tim O'Hara	22,626	22.0
Republican	Larry Kidd	19,583	19.0
Republican	Shane Wilkin	9,932	9.6
Republican	Ron Hood	9,020	8.8
Republican	Phil Heimlich	5,080	4.9
Republican	Tom Hwang	3,202	3.1
Republican	Kim Georgeton	2,311	2.2
Republican	Charles Tassell	1,737	1.7
Republican	Niraj Antani	1,700	1.7
Republican	Derek Myers	1,565	1.5
Total votes		103,003	100.0

=== Democratic primary ===
==== Nominee ====
- Samantha Meadows, clinical nurse manager and nominee for this district in 2022

==== Withdrawn ====
- Joe Wessels, communications consultant (endorsed Heimlich)

==== Endorsements ====
Samantha Meadows

Political parties

- Ohio Democratic Party

Organizations

- Vote Common Good

==== Fundraising ====
Campaign finance reports as of February 28, 2024
Candidate	Raised	Spent	Cash on hand
Samantha Meadows (D)	$17,349	$9,025	$8,340
Source: Federal Election Commission

=== Results ===
Democratic primary results
Party	Candidate	Votes	%
Democratic	Samantha Meadows	15,022	100.0
Total votes		15,022	100.0

=== General election ===
==== Predictions ====
Source	Ranking	As of
Cook Political Report	Solid R	March 5, 2024
Inside Elections	Solid R	March 1, 2024
Sabato's Crystal Ball	Safe R	February 28, 2024
Elections Daily	Safe R	February 5, 2024
CNalysis	Solid R	March 12, 2024

==== Results ====
2024 Ohio's 2nd congressional district election
Party	Candidate	Votes	%
Republican	David Taylor	268,211	73.56%
Democratic	Samantha Meadows	96,401	26.44%
Write-in		4	0.00%
Total votes		364,616	100.0%
Republican hold			

==== By county ====
County	David Taylor Republican		Samantha Meadows Democratic		Various candidates Other parties		Margin		Total
County	#	%	#	%	#	%	#	%	Total
Adams	9,923	82.73%	2,072	17.27%	0	0.00%	7,851	65.45%	11,995
Brown	16,788	81.01%	3,935	18.99%	0	0.00%	12,853	62.02%	20,723
Clermont	76,326	69.08%	34,149	30.91%	2	0.01%	42,177	38.17%	110,477
Clinton	15,548	77.96%	4,395	22.04%	0	0.00%	11,153	55.92%	19,943
Fayette	656	86.66%	101	13.34%	0	0.00%	555	73.32%	757
Gallia	9,839	79.21%	2,581	20.78%	1	0.01%	7,258	58.43%	12,421
Highland	15,692	81.31%	3,608	18.69%	0	0.00%	12,084	62.61%	19,300
Hocking	9,071	70.97%	3,711	29.03%	0	0.00%	5,360	41.93%	12,782
Jackson	10,702	78.14%	2,994	21.86%	0	0.00%	7,708	56.28%	13,696
Lawrence	19,139	73.51%	6,896	26.49%	0	0.00%	12,243	47.03%	26,035
Meigs	7,566	76.98%	2,262	23.02%	0	0.00%	5,304	53.97%	9,828
Pickaway	20,874	74.10%	7,297	25.90%	0	0.00%	13,577	48.19%	28,171
Pike	8,620	74.27%	2,986	25.73%	0	0.00%	5,634	48.54%	11,606
Ross	21,890	68.93%	9,869	31.07%	0	0.00%	12,021	37.85%	31,759
Scioto	21,414	70.16%	8,314	27.24%	1	0.00%	13,100	42.92%	30,519
Vinton	4,163	77.18%	1,231	22.82%	0	0.00%	2,932	54.36%	5,394
Totals	268,211	73.56%	96,401	26.44%	4	0.00%	171,810	47.12%	364,616

== District 3 ==
2024 Ohio's 3rd congressional district election
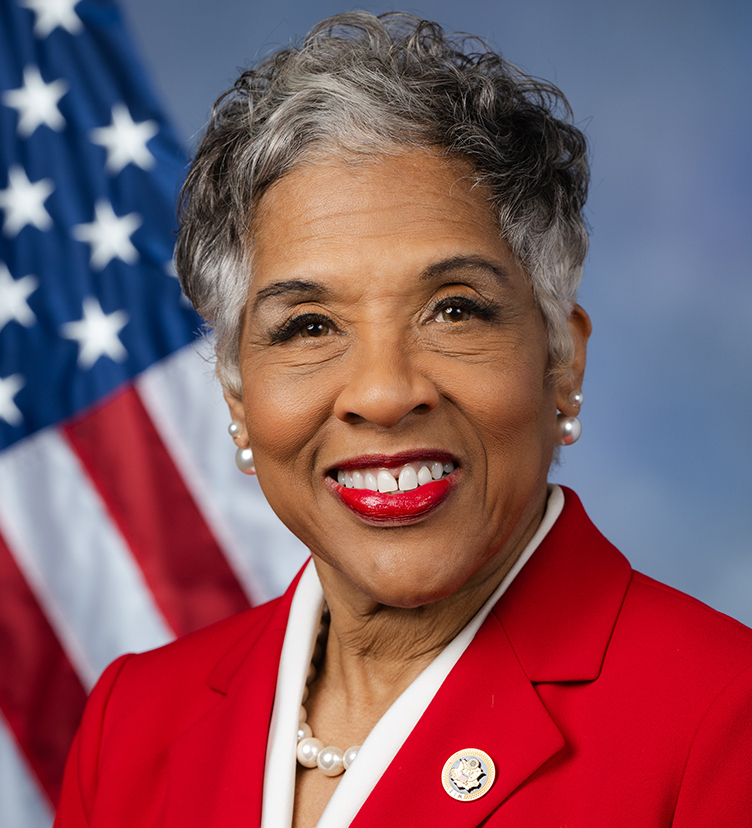

Nominee	Joyce Beatty	Michael Young
Party	Democratic	Republican
Popular vote	242,632	100,355
Percentage	70.74%	29.26%
- Beatty: 50–60% 60–70% 70–80% 80–90% ≥90% Young: 50–60%
U.S. Representative before election
Joyce Beatty
Democratic
Elected U.S. Representative
Joyce Beatty
Democratic

The 3rd district is located entirely within the borders of Franklin County, taking in inner Columbus, Bexley, and Whitehall, as well as Franklin County's share of Reynoldsburg. The incumbent was Democrat Joyce Beatty, who was re-elected with 70.46% of the vote in 2022. She was re-elected in 2024.

=== Democratic primary ===
==== Nominee ====
- Joyce Beatty, incumbent U.S. representative

==== Endorsements ====
Joyce Beatty

Political parties

- Ohio Democratic Party

Organizations

- AIPAC
- Democratic Majority for Israel
- Feminist Majority PAC
- Humane Society Legislative Fund
- National Women's Political Caucus
- Planned Parenthood Action Fund
- Population Connection Action Fund
- Sierra Club

Labor unions

- Ohio Federation of Teachers (post-primary)

==== Fundraising ====
Campaign finance reports as of February 28, 2024
Candidate	Raised	Spent	Cash on hand
Joyce Beatty (D)	$902,776	$814,189	$2,246,070
Source: Federal Election Commission

=== Results ===
Democratic primary results
Party	Candidate	Votes	%
Democratic	Joyce Beatty (incumbent)	46,733	100.0
Total votes		46,733	100.0

=== Republican primary ===
==== Nominee ====
- Michael Young

=== Results ===
Republican primary results
Party	Candidate	Votes	%
Republican	Michael Young	22,066	100.0
Total votes		22,066	100.0

=== General election ===
==== Predictions ====
Source	Ranking	As of
Cook Political Report	Solid D	March 5, 2024
Inside Elections	Solid D	March 1, 2024
Sabato's Crystal Ball	Safe D	February 28, 2024
Elections Daily	Safe D	February 5, 2024
CNalysis	Solid D	March 12, 2024

==== Results ====
2024 Ohio's 3rd congressional district election
Party	Candidate	Votes	%
Democratic	Joyce Beatty (incumbent)	242,632	70.74%
Republican	Michael Young	100,355	29.26%
Total votes		342,987	100.0
Democratic hold			

==== By county ====
County	Joyce Beatty Democratic		Michael Young Republican		Margin		Total
County	#	%	#	%	#	%	Total
Franklin	242,632	70.74%	100,355	29.26%	142,277	41.48%	342,987
Totals	242,632	70.74%	100,355	29.26%	142,277	41.48%	342,987

== District 4 ==
2024 Ohio's 4th congressional district election
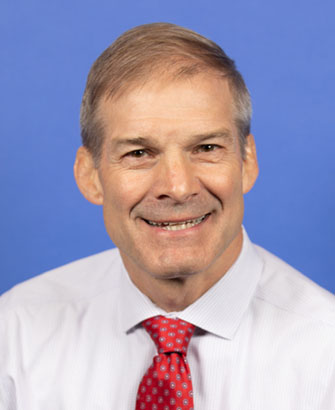

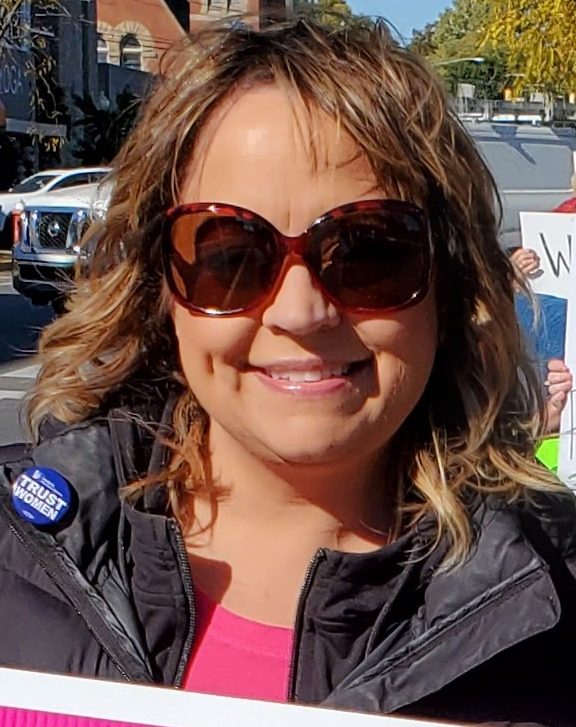
Nominee	Jim Jordan	Tamie Wilson
Party	Republican	Democratic
Popular vote	273,297	125,905
Percentage	68.46%	31.54%
- Jordan: 50–60% 60–70% 70–80% 80–90% >90% Wilson: 50–60% 60–70% 70–80% 80–90% Tie: 50% No votes
U.S. Representative before election
Jim Jordan
Republican
Elected U.S. Representative
Jim Jordan
Republican

The 4th district sprawls from the Columbus exurbs, including Marion and Lima into north-central Ohio, taking in Mansfield. The incumbent was Republican Jim Jordan, who was re-elected with 69.19% of the vote in 2022. He was re-elected in 2024.

=== Republican primary ===
==== Nominee ====
- Jim Jordan, incumbent U.S. representative

==== Endorsements ====
Jim Jordan

Organizations

- AIPAC
- National Rifle Association Political Victory Fund

==== Fundraising ====
Campaign finance reports as of February 28, 2024
Candidate	Raised	Spent	Cash on hand
Jim Jordan (R)	$7,263,105	$5,655,46	$9,292,953
Source: Federal Election Commission

=== Results ===
Republican primary results
Party	Candidate	Votes	%
Republican	Jim Jordan (incumbent)	94,294	100.0
Total votes		94,294	100.0

=== Democratic primary ===
==== Nominee ====
- Tamie Wilson, businesswoman and nominee for this district in 2022

==== Eliminated in primary ====
- Steve Thomas, blockchain consultant

==== Withdrawn ====
- Jeffrey Sites, auto parts logistics manager and candidate for this district in 2020 and 2022 (endorsed Thomas)

=== Results ===
Democratic primary results
Party	Candidate	Votes	%
Democratic	Tamie Wilson	15,149	63.4
Democratic	Steve Thomas	8,748	36.6
Total votes		23,897	100.0

==== Fundraising ====
Campaign finance reports as of February 28, 2024
Candidate	Raised	Spent	Cash on hand
Tamie Wilson (D)	$492,148	$436,548	$64,208
Source: Federal Election Commission

=== General election ===
==== Predictions ====
Source	Ranking	As of
Cook Political Report	Solid R	March 5, 2024
Inside Elections	Solid R	March 1, 2024
Sabato's Crystal Ball	Safe R	February 28, 2024
Elections Daily	Safe R	February 5, 2024
CNalysis	Solid R	March 12, 2024

==== Results ====
2024 Ohio's 4th congressional district election
Party	Candidate	Votes	%
Republican	Jim Jordan (incumbent)	273,297	68.46%
Democratic	Tamie Wilson	125,905	31.54%
Total votes		399,202	100.0
Republican hold			

==== By county ====
County	Jim Jordan Republican		Tamie Wilson Democratic		Margin		Total
County	#	%	#	%	#	%	Total
Allen	32,357	70.66%	13,433	29.34%	18,924	41.33%	45,790
Ashland	19,439	75.09%	6,448	24.91%	12,991	50.18%	25,887
Auglaize	20,837	81.96%	4,585	18.04%	16,252	63.93%	25,422
Champaign	15,227	75.22%	5,016	24.78%	10,211	50.44%	20,243
Delaware	51,887	53.22%	45,608	46.78%	6,279	6.44%	97,495
Hardin	9,699	76.44%	2,990	23.56%	6,709	52.87%	12,689
Logan	18,217	78.10%	5,108	21.90%	13,109	56.20%	23,325
Marion	18,688	70.00%	8,010	30.00%	10,678	40.00%	26,698
Morrow	14,117	77.68%	4,056	22.32%	10,061	55.36%	18,173
Richland	40,088	70.49%	16,785	29.51%	23,303	40.97%	56,873
Shelby	8,525	86.73%	1,304	13.27%	7,221	73.46%	9,829
Union	23,781	65.59%	12,474	34.41%	11,307	31.19%	36,255
Wyandot	435	83.17%	88	16.83%	347	66.35%	523
Totals	273,297	68.46%	125,905	31.54%	147,392	36.92%	399,202

== District 5 ==
2024 Ohio's 5th congressional district election
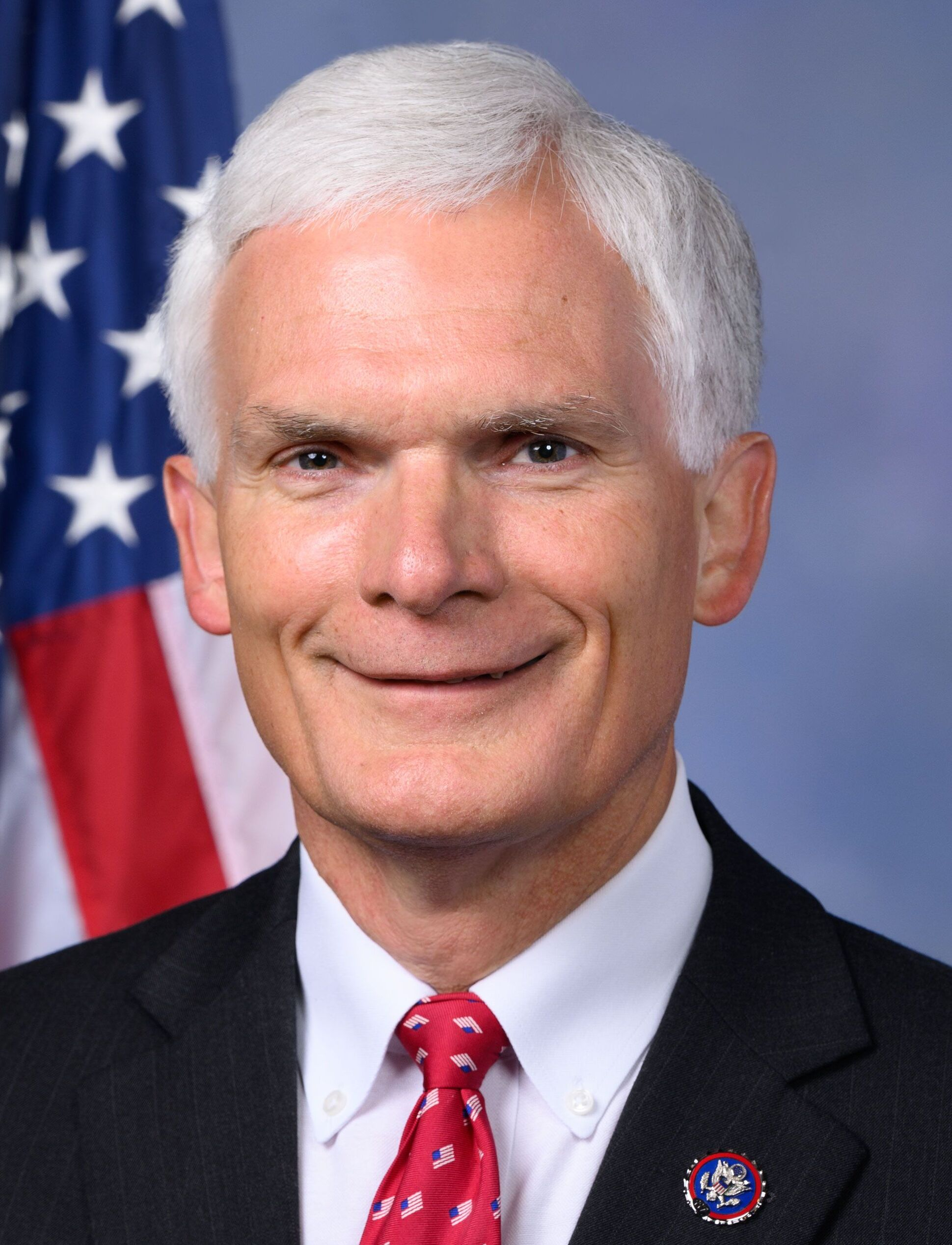

Nominee	Bob Latta	Keith Mundy
Party	Republican	Democratic
Popular vote	255,633	123,024
Percentage	67.51%	32.49%
- Latta: 50–60% 60–70% 70–80% 80–90% >90% Mundy: 50–60% 60–70% 70–80% 80–90% >90% Tie: 50%
U.S. Representative before election
Bob Latta
Republican
Elected U.S. Representative
Bob Latta
Republican

The 5th district encompasses the lower portion of Northwestern Ohio and the middle shore of Lake Erie, taking in Findlay, Lorain, Oberlin, and Bowling Green. The incumbent was Republican Bob Latta, who was re-elected with 66.91% of the vote in 2022.

=== Republican primary ===
==== Nominee ====
- Bob Latta, incumbent U.S. representative

==== Eliminated in primary ====
- Robert Owsiak, paramedic

==== Endorsements ====
Bob Latta

Organizations

- AIPAC
- National Rifle Association Political Victory Fund

==== Fundraising ====
Campaign finance reports as of February 28, 2024
Candidate	Raised	Spent	Cash on hand
Bob Latta (R)	$842,765	$564,868	$1,202,447
Source: Federal Election Commission

=== Results ===
Republican primary results
Party	Candidate	Votes	%
Republican	Bob Latta (incumbent)	70,077	82.9
Republican	Robert Owsiak	14,478	17.1
Total votes		84,555	100.0

=== Democratic primary ===
==== Nominee ====
- Keith Mundy, legal research firm owner and nominee for the 16th district in 2016

=== Results ===
Democratic primary results
Party	Candidate	Votes	%
Democratic	Keith Mundy	26,920	100.0
Total votes		26,920	100.0

=== General election ===
==== Predictions ====
Source	Ranking	As of
Cook Political Report	Solid R	March 5, 2024
Inside Elections	Solid R	March 1, 2024
Sabato's Crystal Ball	Safe R	February 28, 2024
Elections Daily	Safe R	February 5, 2024
CNalysis	Solid R	March 12, 2024

==== Results ====
2024 Ohio's 5th congressional district election
Party	Candidate	Votes	%
Republican	Bob Latta (incumbent)	255,633	67.51
Democratic	Keith Mundy	123,024	32.49
Total votes		378,657	100.0
Republican hold			

==== By county ====
County	Bob Latta Republican		Keith Mundy Democratic		Margin		Total
County	#	%	#	%	#	%	Total
Crawford	15,361	77.73%	4,400	22.27%	10,961	55.47%	19,761
Hancock	27,667	74.63%	9,403	25.37%	18,264	49.27%	37,070
Henry	11,633	80.08%	2,893	19.92%	8,740	60.17%	14,526
Huron	19,135	73.54%	6,884	26.46%	12,251	47.08%	26,019
Lorain	78,527	53.24%	68,982	46.76%	9,545	6.47%	147,509
Mercer	19,351	85.71%	3,226	14.29%	16,125	71.42%	22,577
Paulding	7,327	80.29%	1,799	19.71%	5,528	60.57%	9,126
Putnam	17,232	88.35%	2,272	11.65%	14,960	76.70%	19,504
Seneca	18,361	73.87%	6,495	26.13%	11,866	47.74%	24,856
Van Wert	11,981	82.33%	2,571	17.67%	9,410	64.66%	14,552
Wood	20,607	63.44%	11,876	36.56%	8,731	26.88%	32,483
Wyandot	8,451	79.17%	2,223	20.83%	6,228	58.35%	10,674
Totals	255,633	67.51%	123,024	32.49%	132,609	35.02%	378,657

== District 6 ==
2024 Ohio's 6th congressional district election
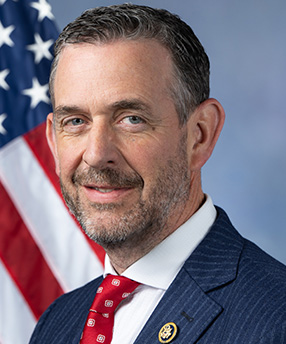

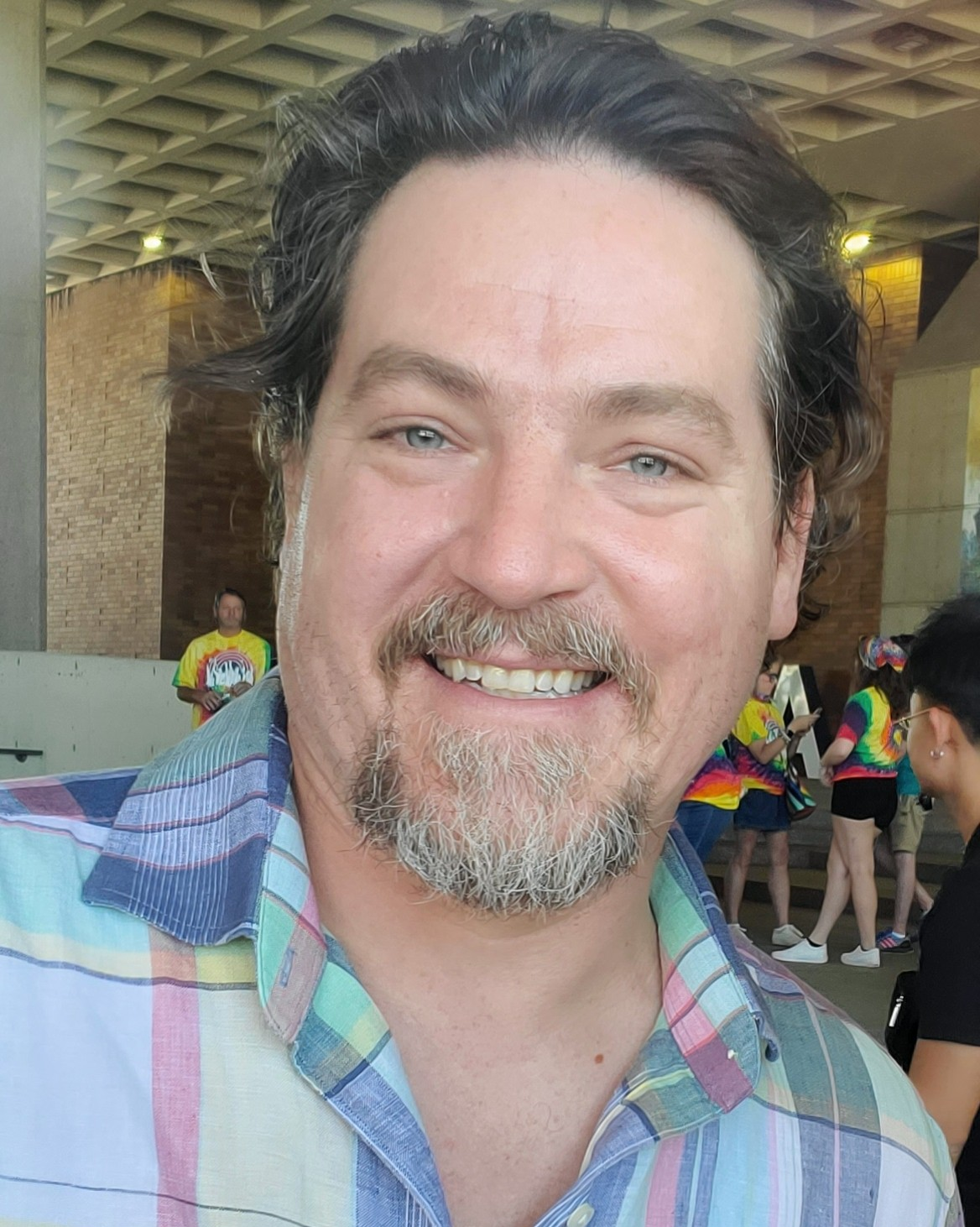
Nominee	Michael Rulli	Michael Kripchak
Party	Republican	Democratic
Popular vote	245,860	122,515
Percentage	66.74%	33.26%
- Rulli: 50–60% 60–70% 70–80% 80–90% >90% Kripchak: 50–60% 60–70% 70–80% 80–90% >90% Tie: 50%
U.S. Representative before election
Michael Rulli
Republican
Elected U.S. Representative
Michael Rulli
Republican

The 6th district encompasses Appalachian Ohio and the Mahoning Valley, including Youngstown, Steubenville, and Marietta. The incumbent was Republican Bill Johnson, who was re-elected with 67.72% of the vote in 2022. He resigned on January 21, 2024, to become president of Youngstown State University. Republican Michael Rulli won in a special election against Democrat Michael Kripchak. Rulli was re-elected in November 2024.

=== Republican primary ===
==== Nominee ====
- Michael Rulli, incumbent U.S. representative

==== Eliminated in primary ====
- Reggie Stoltzfus, state representative
- Rick Tsai, chiropractor

==== Withdrawn ====
- Bill Johnson, former U.S. representative (became president of Youngstown State University)

==== Declined ====
- Christina Hagan, former state representative and nominee for the 13th district in 2020
- Christian Palich, vice president of public affairs for Taft Stettinius & Hollister

==== Endorsements ====
Michael Rulli

Organizations

- BIPAC
- Republican Main Street Partnership PAC
- U.S. Chamber of Commerce

==== Fundraising ====
Campaign finance reports as of December 31, 2023
Candidate	Raised	Spent	Cash on hand
Michael Rulli (R)	$442,734 (Note: $30,400 of this total was self-funded by Rulli)	$282,192	$160,542
Reggie Stoltzfus (R)	$487,707 (Note: $250,000 of this total was self-funded by Stoltzfus)	$248,111	$239,595
Rick Tsai (R)	$25,171 (Note: $1,058 of this total was self-funded by Tsai)	$17,872	$7,298
Source: Federal Election Commission

=== Results ===
Republican primary results
Party	Candidate	Votes	%
Republican	Michael Rulli	43,857	49.5
Republican	Reggie Stoltzfus	36,033	40.7
Republican	Rick Tsai	8,641	9.8
Total votes		88,531	100.0

=== Democratic primary ===
==== Nominee ====
- Michael Kripchak, businessman

==== Eliminated in primary ====
- Rylan Finzer, marijuana business owner

==== Declined ====
- Louis Lyras, businessman and nominee for this district in 2022

==== Fundraising ====
Campaign finance reports as of February 28, 2024
Candidate	Raised	Spent	Cash on hand
Rylan Finzer (D)	$5,153	$3,301	$1,876
Source: Federal Election Commission

=== Results ===
Democratic primary results
Party	Candidate	Votes	%
Democratic	Michael Kripchak	20,632	66.3
Democratic	Rylan Finzer	10,480	33.7
Total votes		31,112	100.0

=== Independents ===
==== Declined ====
- William Farms, U.S. Air Force veteran

=== General election ===
==== Predictions ====
Source	Ranking	As of
Cook Political Report	Solid R	March 5, 2024
Inside Elections	Solid R	March 1, 2024
Sabato's Crystal Ball	Safe R	February 28, 2024
Elections Daily	Safe R	February 5, 2024
CNalysis	Solid R	March 12, 2024

==== Results ====
2024 Ohio's 6th congressional district election
Party	Candidate	Votes	%
Republican	Michael Rulli (incumbent)	245,860	66.74%
Democratic	Michael Kripchak	122,515	33.26%
Total votes		368,375	100.0%
Republican hold			

==== By county ====
County	Michael Rulli Republican		Michael Kripchak Democratic		Margin		Total
County	#	%	#	%	#	%	Total
Belmont	20,988	71.21%	8,484	28.79%	12,504	42.44%	29,472
Carroll	10,171	76.64%	3,101	23.36%	7,070	53.27%	13,272
Columbiana	36,017	76.40%	11,124	23.60%	24,893	52.81%	47,141
Harrison	5,166	75.04%	1,718	24.96%	3,448	50.09%	6,884
Jefferson	20,867	69.10%	9,333	30.90%	11,534	38.19%	30,200
Mahoning	63,415	57.44%	46,984	42.56%	16,431	14.88%	110,399
Monroe	4,768	74.58%	1,625	25.42%	3,143	49.16%	6,393
Noble	4,623	80.64%	1,110	19.36%	3,513	61.28%	5,733
Stark	40,073	65.93%	20,705	34.07%	19,368	31.87%	60,778
Tuscarawas	18,946	66.25%	9,652	33.75%	9,294	32.59%	28,598
Washington	20,826	70.58%	8,679	29.42%	12,147	41.17%	29,505
Totals	245,860	66.74%	122,515	33.26%	123,345	33.48%	368,375

== District 7 ==
2024 Ohio's 7th congressional district election
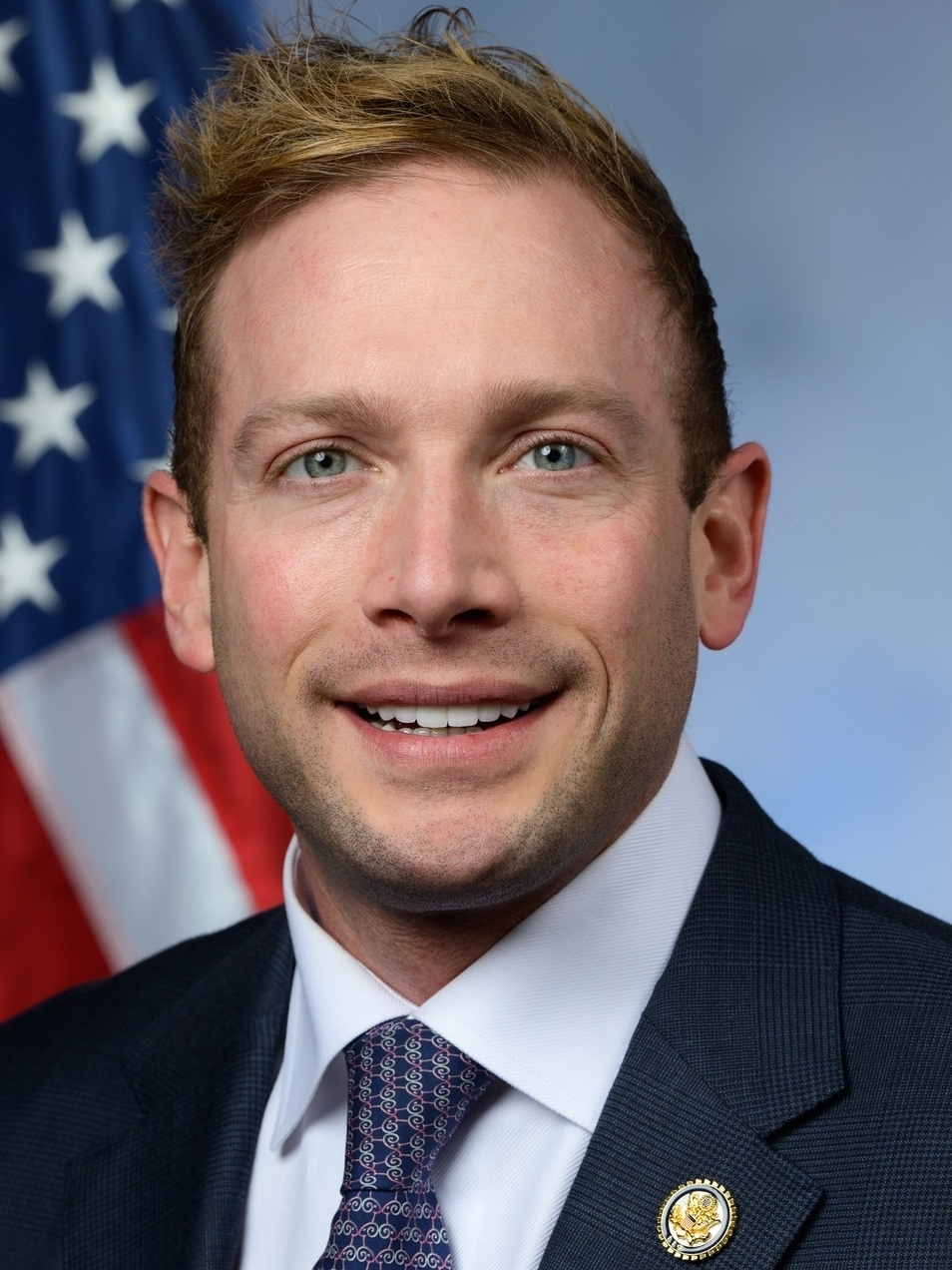

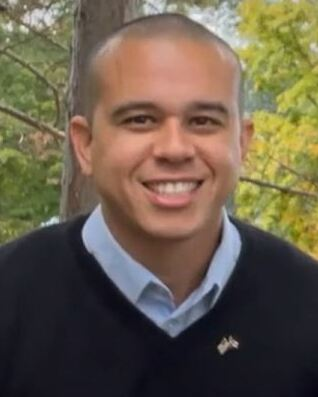

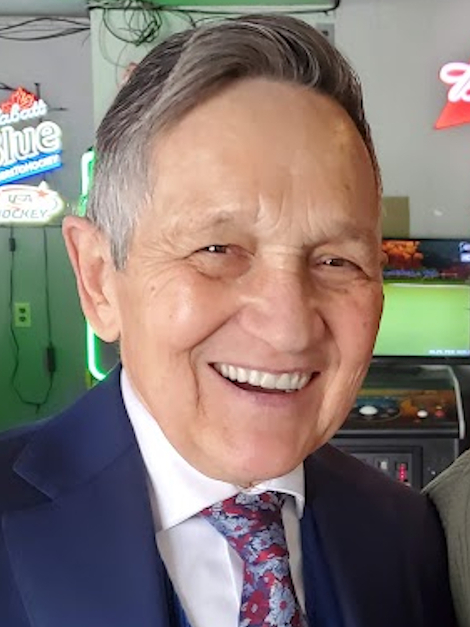
Nominee	Max Miller	Matthew Diemer	Dennis Kucinich
Party	Republican	Democratic	Independent
Popular vote	204,494	144,613	51,264
Percentage	51.08%	36.12%	12.80%
- Miller: 40–50% 50–60% 60–70% 70–80% 80–90% >90% Diemer: 30–40% 40–50% 50–60% 60–70% 70–80% 80–90%
U.S. Representative before election
Max Miller
Republican
Elected U.S. Representative
Max Miller
Republican

The 7th district stretches from exurban Cleveland to rural areas in north central Ohio, including Medina and Wooster. The incumbent was Republican Max Miller, who was elected with 55.36% of the vote in 2022. He was re-elected in 2024.

=== Republican primary ===
==== Nominee ====
- Max Miller, incumbent U.S. representative

==== Endorsements ====
Max Miller

Organizations

- AIPAC
- Log Cabin Republicans PAC
- National Rifle Association Political Victory Fund
- Republican Jewish Coalition

==== Fundraising ====
Campaign finance reports as of February 28, 2024
Candidate	Raised	Spent	Cash on hand
Max Miller (R)	$1,229,051	$551,859	$749,889
Source: Federal Election Commission

=== Results ===
Republican primary results
Party	Candidate	Votes	%
Republican	Max Miller (incumbent)	62,075	100.0
Total votes		62,075	100.0

=== Democratic primary ===
==== Nominee ====
- Matthew Diemer, podcast producer and nominee for this district in 2022

==== Eliminated in primary ====
- Doug Bugie, recruitment executive

==== Endorsements ====
Matthew Diemer

Political parties

- Ohio Democratic Party

==== Fundraising ====
Campaign finance reports as of February 28, 2024
Candidate	Raised	Spent	Cash on hand
Doug Bugie (D)	$41,285 (Note: $25,000 of this total was self-funded by Bugie)	$34,481	$6,803
Matthew Diemer (D)	$388,092	$395,263	$55,534
Source: Federal Election Commission

=== Results ===
Democratic primary results
Party	Candidate	Votes	%
Democratic	Matthew Diemer	33,765	81.7
Democratic	Doug Bugie	7,540	18.3
Total votes		41,305	100.0

=== Independents ===
==== Declared ====
- Dennis Kucinich, former Democratic U.S. representative from OH-10 (1997–2013) and former mayor of Cleveland (1977–1979)

==== Fundraising ====
Campaign finance reports as of February 28, 2024
Candidate	Raised	Spent	Cash on hand
Dennis Kucinich (I)	$98,658	$48,346	$50,311
Source: Federal Election Commission

=== General election ===
==== Predictions ====
Source	Ranking	As of
Cook Political Report	Solid R	March 5, 2024
Inside Elections	Solid R	March 1, 2024
Sabato's Crystal Ball	Safe R	February 28, 2024
Elections Daily	Safe R	February 5, 2024
CNalysis	Solid R	March 12, 2024

==== Endorsements ====
Dennis Kucinich (I)

Newspapers

- The Plain Dealer

==== Results ====
2024 Ohio's 7th congressional district election
Party	Candidate	Votes	%
Republican	Max Miller (incumbent)	204,494	51.08%
Democratic	Matthew Diemer	144,613	36.12%
Independent	Dennis Kucinich	51,264	12.80%
Total votes		400,371	100.0%
Republican hold			

==== By county ====
County	Max Miller Republican		Matthew Diemer Democratic		Dennis Kucinich Independent		Margin		Total
County	#	%	#	%	#	%	#	%	Total
Cuyahoga	107,339	44.08%	99,478	40.85%	36,696	15.07%	7,861	3.23%	243,513
Holmes	2,154	81.68%	370	14.03%	113	4.29%	1,784	67.65%	2,637
Medina	60,179	58.80%	31,750	31.02%	10,418	10.18%	28,429	27.78%	102,347
Wayne	34,822	67.13%	13,015	25.09%	4,037	7.78%	21,807	42.04%	51,874
Totals	204,494	51.08%	144,613	36.12%	51,264	12.80%	59,881	14.96%	400,371

== District 8 ==
2024 Ohio's 8th congressional district election
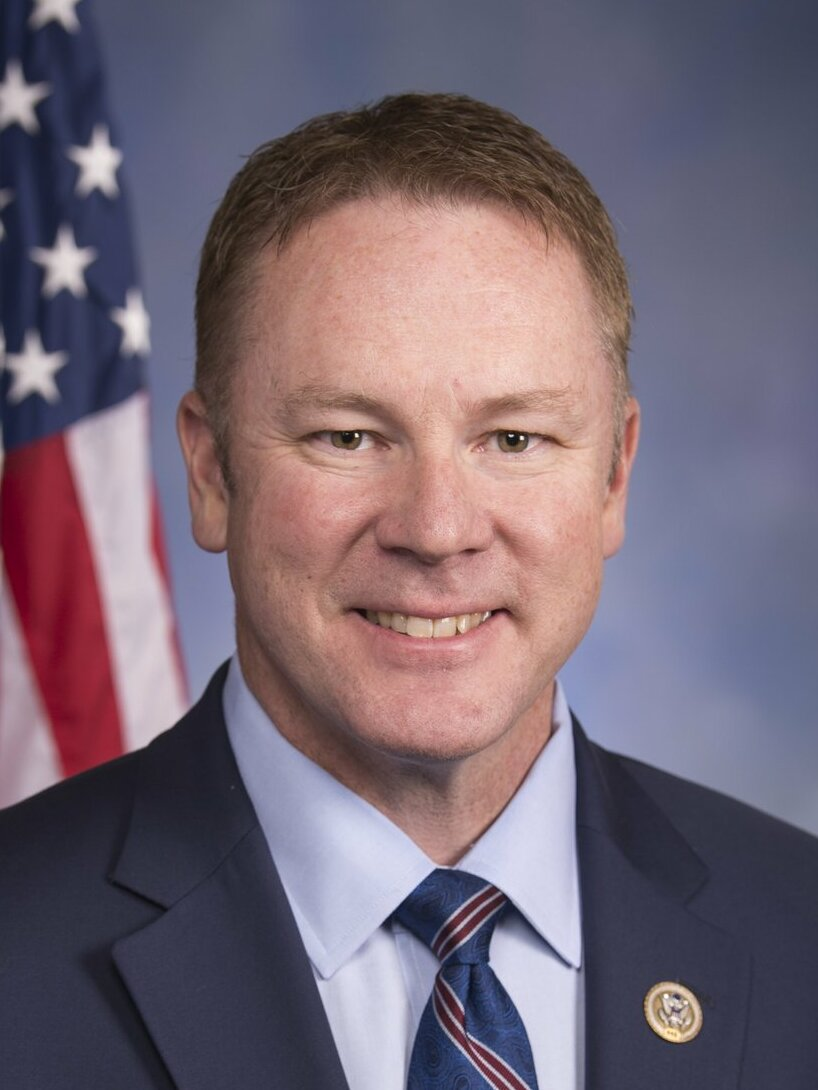

Nominee	Warren Davidson	Vanessa Enoch
Party	Republican	Democratic
Popular vote	237,503	140,625
Percentage	62.81%	37.19%
- Davidson: 50–60% 60–70% 70–80% 80–90% ≥90% Enoch: 50–60% 60–70% 70–80% 80–90% ≥90%
U.S. Representative before election
Warren Davidson
Republican
Elected U.S. Representative
Warren Davidson
Warren Davidson

The 8th district takes in the northern and western suburbs of Cincinnati, including Butler County. The incumbent was Republican Warren Davidson, who was re-elected with 64.64% of the vote in 2022. He was re-elected in 2024.

=== Republican primary ===
==== Nominee ====
- Warren Davidson, incumbent U.S. representative

==== Eliminated in primary ====
- Kay Rogers, former Butler County auditor and convicted felon

==== Endorsements ====
Warren Davidson

Organizations

- National Rifle Association Political Victory Fund

==== Fundraising ====
Campaign finance reports as of February 28, 2024
Candidate	Raised	Spent	Cash on hand
Warren Davidson (R)	$668,308	$537,903	$467,871
Kay Rogers (R)	$7,452	$224	$7,228
Source: Federal Election Commission

=== Results ===
Republican primary results
Party	Candidate	Votes	%
Republican	Warren Davidson (incumbent)	59,712	80.0
Republican	Kay Rogers	14,933	20.0
Total votes		74,645	100.0

=== Democratic primary ===
==== Nominee ====
- Vanessa Enoch, business consultant and nominee for this district in 2018, 2020, and 2022

==== Eliminated in primary ====
- David Gelb, businessman
- Nathaniel Hawkins, hospital patient access representative

==== Fundraising ====
Campaign finance reports as of February 28, 2024
Candidate	Raised	Spent	Cash on hand
David Gelb (D)	$27,540 (Note: $25,000 of this total was self-funded by Gelb)	$11,830	$15,709
Nathaniel Hawkins (D)	$3,323	$391	$2,182
Source: Federal Election Commission

=== Results ===
Democratic primary results
Party	Candidate	Votes	%
Democratic	Vanessa Enoch	15,650	72.0
Democratic	Nathaniel Hawkins	3,689	17.0
Democratic	David Gelb	2,407	11.1
Total votes		21,746	100.0

=== General election ===
==== Predictions ====
Source	Ranking	As of
Cook Political Report	Solid R	March 5, 2024
Inside Elections	Solid R	March 1, 2024
Sabato's Crystal Ball	Safe R	February 28, 2024
Elections Daily	Safe R	February 5, 2024
CNalysis	Solid R	March 12, 2024

==== Results ====
2024 Ohio's 8th congressional district election
Party	Candidate	Votes	%
Republican	Warren Davidson (incumbent)	237,503	62.81%
Democratic	Vanessa Enoch	140,625	37.19%
Total votes		378,128	100.0
Republican hold			

==== By county ====
County	Warren Davidson Republican		Vanessa Enoch Democratic		Margin		Total
County	#	%	#	%	#	%	Total
Butler	113,884	64.14%	63,682	35.86%	50,202	28.27%	177,566
Darke	22,262	83.83%	4,294	16.17%	17,968	67.66%	26,556
Hamilton	76,342	53.50%	66,342	46.50%	10,000	7.01%	142,684
Miami	8,039	79.55%	2,066	20.45%	5,973	59.11%	10,105
Preble	16,976	80.01%	4,241	19.99%	12,735	60.02%	21,217
Totals	237,503	62.81%	140,625	37.19%	96,878	25.62%	378,128

== District 9 ==
2024 Ohio's 9th congressional district election
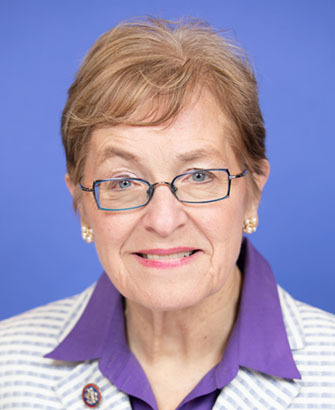

Nominee	Marcy Kaptur	Derek Merrin
Party	Democratic	Republican
Popular vote	181,098	178,716
Percentage	48.27%	47.63%
- Kaptur: 40–50% 50–60% 60–70% 70–80% 80–90% >90% Merrin: 40–50% 50–60% 60–70% 70–80% 80–90% Tie: 40–50%
U.S. Representative before election
Marcy Kaptur
Democratic
Elected U.S. Representative
Marcy Kaptur
Democratic

The 9th district is based in Northwest Ohio, including Toledo and the western Lake Erie coast. The incumbent was Democrat Marcy Kaptur, was re-elected with 48.27% of the vote in 2024, down from 56.63% of the vote in 2022. This was her closest margin, and the first election she won only by plurality, not winning a majority of the vote.

=== Democratic primary ===
==== Nominee ====
- Marcy Kaptur, incumbent U.S. representative

==== Endorsements ====
Marcy Kaptur

Statewide officials

- Gretchen Whitmer, governor of Michigan (2019–present)

Political parties

- Ohio Democratic Party

Organizations

- Everytown for Gun Safety Action Fund
- Feminist Majority PAC
- Humane Society Legislative Fund
- J Street PAC
- Jewish Democratic Council of America
- Natural Resources Defense Council
- Planned Parenthood Action Fund
- Sierra Club

Labor unions

- National Education Association
- Ohio Federation of Teachers (post-primary)

==== Fundraising ====
Campaign finance reports as of February 28, 2024
Candidate	Raised	Spent	Cash on hand
Marcy Kaptur (D)	$1,517,505	$412,626	$1,484,926
Source: Federal Election Commission

=== Results ===
Democratic primary results
Party	Candidate	Votes	%
Democratic	Marcy Kaptur (incumbent)	38,398	100.0
Total votes		38,398	100.0

=== Republican primary ===
==== Nominee ====
- Derek Merrin, state representative (2016-2025)

==== Eliminated in primary ====
- Steve Lankenau, former mayor of Napoleon
- Craig Riedel, former state representative and candidate for this district in 2022

==== Withdrawn ====
- J. R. Majewski, (Note: Majewski announced in April 2023 that he would campaign for this district in 2024, before dropping out of the race a month later. He re-entered the race in October, only to drop out again in March 2024.) project manager and nominee for this district in 2022 (endorsed Merrin)
- Dan Wilczynski, former mayor of Walbridge

==== Declined ====
- Theresa Gavarone, state senator and candidate for this district in 2022 (running for re-election)

==== Debates ====
No.	Date	Host	Moderator	Link	Candidates			
Key: P Participant A Absent N Non-invitee I Invitee W Withdrawn
Key: P Participant A Absent N Non-invitee I Invitee W Withdrawn					Steve Lankenau	J. R. Majewski	Derek Merrin	Craig Riedel
1	Feb. 27, 2024	Sandusky Register	Matt Westerhold		P	I	P	I

==== Endorsements ====
Derek Merrin

U.S. presidents

- Donald Trump, 45th and 47th president of the United States (2017–2021, 2025–)

U.S. representatives

- Mike Johnson, speaker of the House (2023–present) from LA-04 (2017–present)

Individuals

- J. R. Majewski, nominee for this district in 2022

Political parties

- Lucas County Republican Party

Organizations

- Americans for Prosperity (post-primary)
- Congressional Leadership Fund (post-primary)
- United States Chamber of Commerce
Craig Riedel

U.S. representatives

- Tom Emmer, MN-06 (2015–present)
- Jim Jordan, OH-04 (2007–present)
- Kevin McCarthy, 55th speaker of the United States House of Representatives (2023) from CA-20 (2007–2023)
- ~~Max Miller, OH-07 (2023–present)~~
- Steve Scalise, LA-01 (2008–present)
- ~~Elise Stefanik, NY-21 (2015–present)~~

State senators

- George Lang, SD-04 (2021–present)
- Rob McColley, majority leader of the Ohio Senate (2023–present) from SD-01 (2017–present)
- Bill Reineke, SD-26 (2021–present)
- Mark Romanchuk, SD-22 (2021–present)

State representatives

- Gary Click, HD-88 (2021–present)
- Rodney Creech, HD-40 (2021–present)
- Jon Cross, HD-83 (2019–present)
- Thomas Hall, HD-46 (2021–present)
- Roy Klopfenstein, HD-82 (2023–present)
- Brian Lampton, HD-70 (2021–present)
- Riordan McClain, HD-87 (2018–present)
- Reggie Stoltzfus, HD-50 (2019–present)

Organizations

- Americans for Prosperity
- Ohio Right to Life
J. R. Majewski (withdrawn)

Executive branch officials

- Michael Flynn, 25th national security advisor (2017)
- Kash Patel, chief of staff to the acting U.S. secretary of defense (2020–2021)

U.S. ambassadors

- Richard Grenell, former U.S. ambassador to Germany (2018–2020)

U.S. senators

- JD Vance, Ohio (2023–present)

U.S. representatives

- Eli Crane, AZ-02 (2023–present)
- Byron Donalds, FL-19 (2021–present)
- Matt Gaetz, FL-01 (2017–present)
- Bob Good, VA-05 (2021–present)
- Cory Mills, FL-07 (2023–present)

Statewide officials

- Frank LaRose, Ohio secretary of state (2019–present)

State representatives

- ~~Steve Kraus, HD-89 (2015)~~
- D. J. Swearingen, HD-89 (2019–present)

Individuals

- Vivek Ramaswamy, pharmaceutical executive
- Roger Stone, political consultant and lobbyist

Organizations

- Republicans for National Renewal

==== Fundraising ====
Campaign finance reports as of February 28, 2024
Candidate	Raised	Spent	Cash on hand
Steve Lankenau (R)	$113,057 (Note: $50,369 of this total was self-funded by Lankenau)	$93,817	$19,240
J. R. Majewski (R) (Note: Withdrawn candidate)	$282,441	$214,677	$67,764
Derek Merrin (R)	$174,833 (Note: $30,000 of this total was self-funded by Merrin)	$80,811	$94,022
Craig Riedel (R)	$1,162,524 (Note: $175,000 of this total was self-funded by Riedel)	$928,271	$234,253
Source: Federal Election Commission

=== Results ===
Results by county: Merrin–40–50% Merrin–50–60% Merrin–60–70% Riedel–40–50% Riedel–60–70%

Republican primary results
Party	Candidate	Votes	%
Republican	Derek Merrin	27,632	52.5
Republican	Craig Riedel	18,072	34.3
Republican	Steve Lankenau	6,946	13.2
Total votes		52,650	100.0

=== General election ===
==== Predictions ====
Source	Ranking	As of
Cook Political Report	Lean D	September 6, 2024
Inside Elections	Tilt D	May 9, 2024
Sabato's Crystal Ball	Lean D	February 28, 2024
Elections Daily	Lean D	November 4, 2024
CNalysis	Lean D	August 18, 2024

==== Polling ====
Poll source	Date(s) administered	Sample size (Note: Key: A – all adults RV – registered voters LV – likely voters V – unclear)	Margin of error	Marcy Kaptur (D)	Derek Merrin (R)	Undecided
Noble Predictive Insights (Note: Poll commissioned by Inside Elections)	July 22–24, 2024	435 (LV)	± 4.7%	47%	37%	6%

==== Results ====
2024 Ohio's 9th congressional district election
Party	Candidate	Votes	%
Democratic	Marcy Kaptur (incumbent)	181,098	48.27
Republican	Derek Merrin	178,716	47.63
Libertarian	Tom Pruss	15,381	4.10
Total votes		375,195	100.0
Democratic hold			

==== By county ====
County	Marcy Kaptur Democratic		Derek Merrin Republican		Tom Pruss Libertarian		Margin		Total
County	#	%	#	%	#	%	#	%	Total
Defiance	5,738	30.64%	12,164	64.96%	824	4.40%	−6,426	−34.32%	18,726
Erie	17,622	45.10%	19,993	51.17%	1,457	3.73%	−2,371	−6.07%	39,072
Fulton	6,833	30.98%	14,464	65.58%	758	3.44%	−7,631	−34.60%	22,055
Lucas	109,693	57.66%	72,592	38.16%	7,957	4.18%	37,101	19.50%	190,242
Ottawa	9,451	39.89%	13,385	56.49%	858	3.62%	−3,934	−16.60%	23,694
Sandusky	10,729	36.58%	17,234	58.76%	1,368	4.66%	−6,505	−22.18%	29,331
Williams	4,854	26.96%	12,303	68.34%	846	4.70%	−7,449	−41.38%	18,003
Wood	16,178	47.48%	16,581	48.66%	1,313	3.85%	−403	−1.18%	34,072
Totals	181,098	48.27%	178,716	47.63%	15,381	4.10%	2,382	0.63%	375,195

== District 10 ==
2024 Ohio's 10th congressional district election
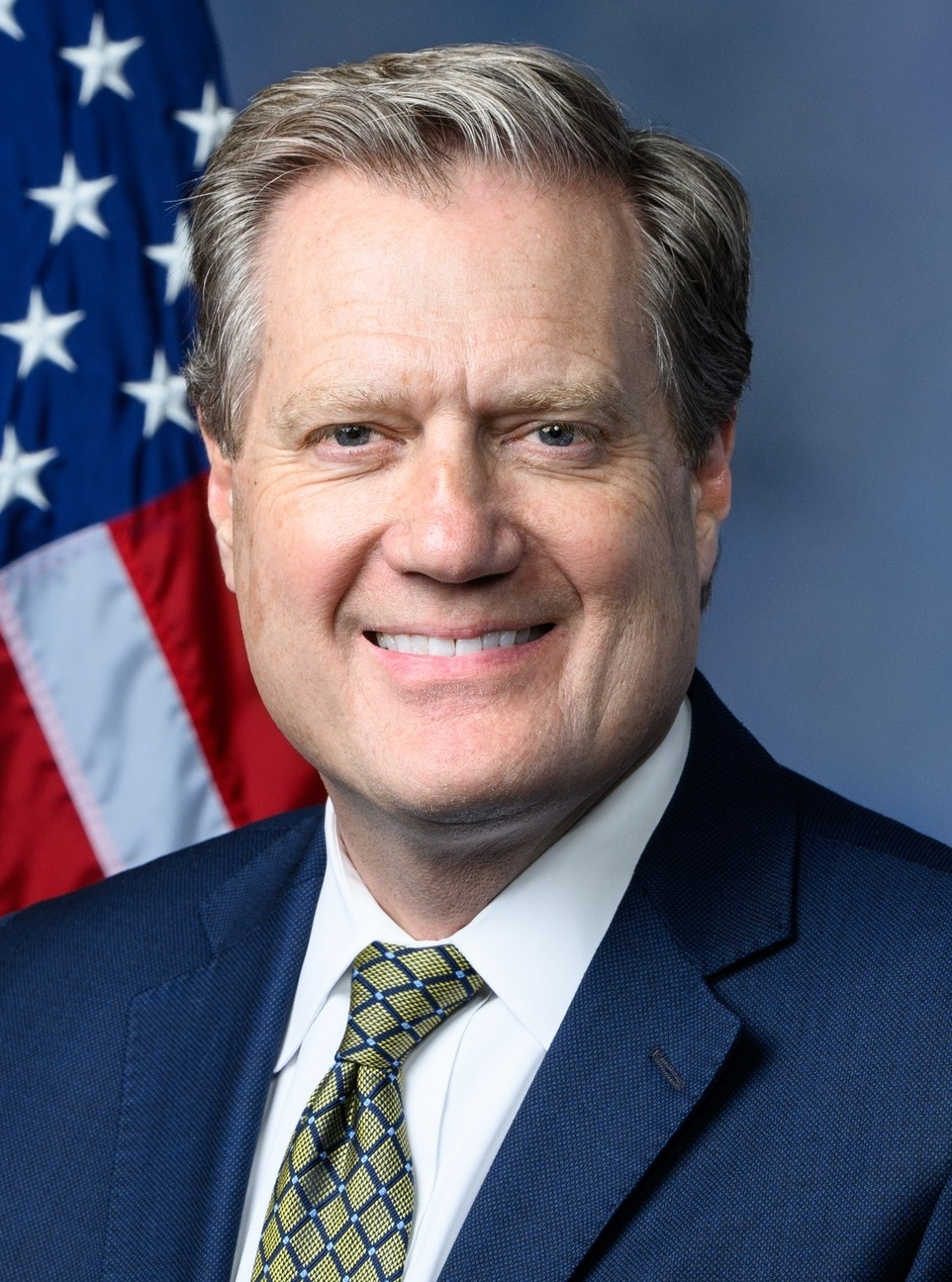

Nominee	Mike Turner	Amy Cox
Party	Republican	Democratic
Popular vote	213,695	145,420
Percentage	57.64%	39.22%
- Turner: 40–50% 50–60% 60–70% 70–80% 80–90% >90% Cox: 40–50% 50–60% 60–70% 70–80% 80–90% >90%
U.S. Representative before election
Mike Turner
Republican
Elected U.S. Representative
Mike Turner
Republican

The 10th district encompasses the Dayton metro area, including Dayton and the surrounding suburbs, as well as Springfield. The incumbent was Republican Mike Turner, who was re-elected with 61.67% of the vote in 2022. He was re-elected in 2024.

=== Republican primary ===
==== Nominee ====
- Mike Turner, incumbent U.S. representative

==== Endorsements ====
Mike Turner

Organizations

- AIPAC
- Pro-Israel America

==== Fundraising ====
Campaign finance reports as of February 28, 2024
Candidate	Raised	Spent	Cash on hand
Mike Turner (R)	$643,469	$543,483	$670,854
Source: Federal Election Commission

=== Results ===
Republican primary results
Party	Candidate	Votes	%
Republican	Mike Turner (incumbent)	61,941	100.0
Total votes		61,941	100.0

=== Democratic primary ===
==== Nominee ====
- Amy Cox, teacher

==== Eliminated in primary ====
- David Esrati, businessman and nominee for this district in 2022, candidate for this district in 2012, and candidate for the 3rd district in 2010
- Joseph Kuzniar, retired aerospace engineer
- Tony Pombo, computer programmer

==== Endorsements ====
Amy Cox

Political parties

- Ohio Democratic Party

Organizations

- Vote Common Good

Labor unions

- Ohio Federation of Teachers (post-primary)

==== Fundraising ====
Campaign finance reports as of February 28, 2024
Candidate	Raised	Spent	Cash on hand
Amy Cox (D)	$55,998 (Note: $2,705 of this total was self-funded by Cox)	$$40,924	$15,074
David Esrati (D)	$5,928	$1,992	$4,459
Tony Pombo (D)	$10,000 (Note: $10,000 of this total was self-funded by Pombo)	$5,238	$4,761
Source: Federal Election Commission

=== Results ===
Democratic primary results
Party	Candidate	Votes	%
Democratic	Amy Cox	22,640	63.3
Democratic	David Esrati	7,767	21.7
Democratic	Tony Pombo	3,296	9.2
Democratic	Joseph Kuzniar	2,046	5.7
Total votes		35,749	100.0

=== Independents ===
==== Declared ====
- Michael Harbaugh, food truck owner

==== Fundraising ====
Campaign finance reports as of December 31, 2023
Candidate	Raised	Spent	Cash on hand
Michael Harbaugh (I)	$6,867	$3,228	$3,638
Source: Federal Election Commission

=== General election ===
==== Predictions ====
Source	Ranking	As of
Cook Political Report	Solid R	March 5, 2024
Inside Elections	Solid R	March 1, 2024
Sabato's Crystal Ball	Safe R	February 28, 2024
Elections Daily	Safe R	February 5, 2024
CNalysis	Solid R	March 12, 2024

==== Results ====
2024 Ohio's 10th congressional district election
Party	Candidate	Votes	%
Republican	Mike Turner (incumbent)	213,695	57.64%
Democratic	Amy Cox	145,420	39.22%
Independent	Michael Harbaugh	11,631	3.14%
Total votes		370,746	100.0%
Republican hold			

==== By county ====
County	Mike Turner Republican		Amy Cox Democratic		Michael Harbaugh Independent		Margin		Total
County	#	%	#	%	#	%	#	%	Total
Clark	19,299	58.79%	12,316	37.52%	1,213	3.70%	6,983	21.27%	32,828
Greene	57,528	64.51%	28,963	32.48%	2,685	3.01%	28,565	32.03%	89,176
Montgomery	136,868	55.02%	104,141	41.87%	7,733	3.11%	32,727	13.16%	248,742
Totals	213,695	57.64%	145,420	39.22%	11,631	3.14%	68,275	18.42%	370,746

== District 11 ==
2024 Ohio's 11th congressional district election
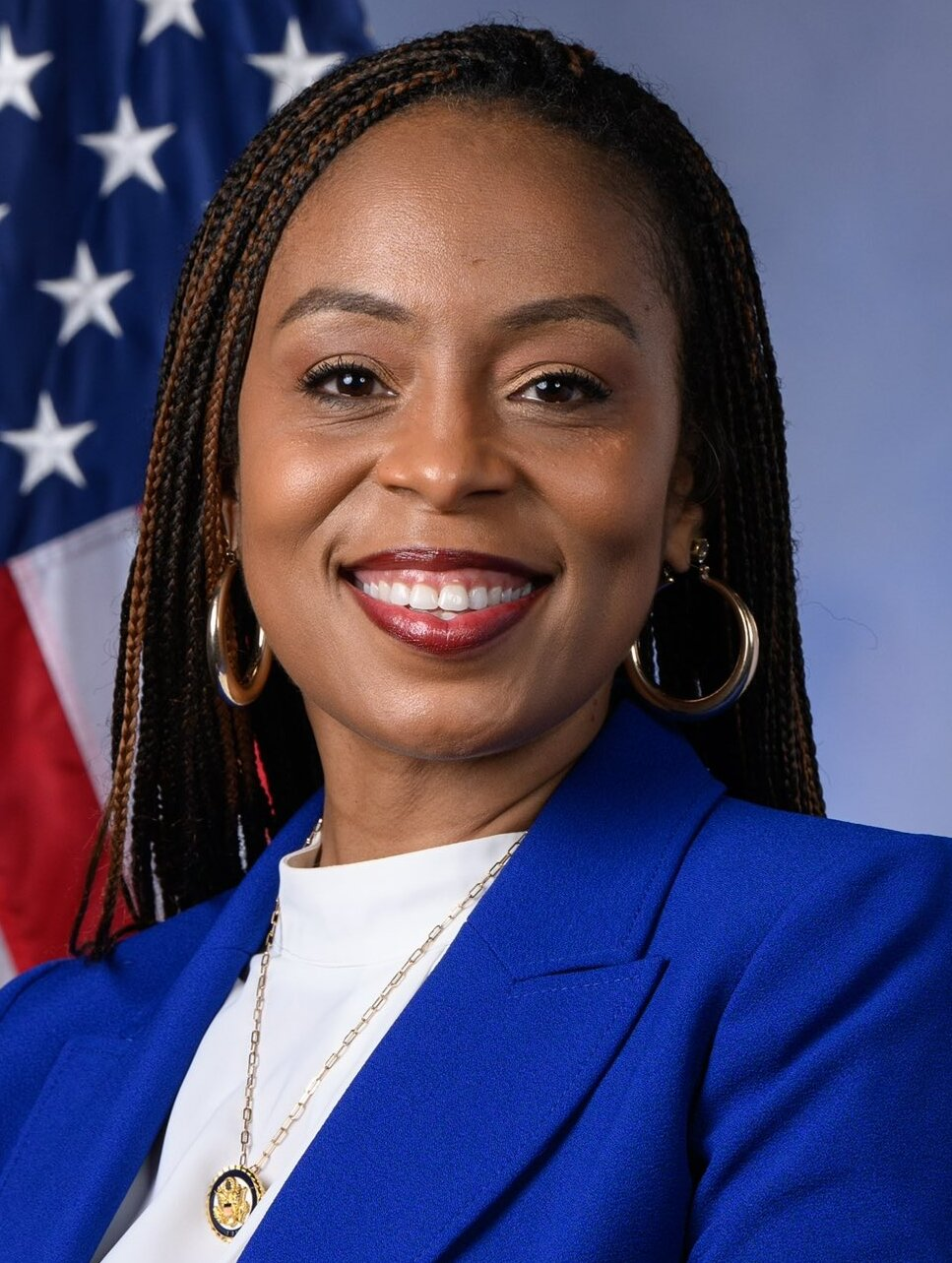

Nominee	Shontel Brown	Alan Rapoport
Party	Democratic	Republican
Popular vote	236,883	59,394
Percentage	78.33%	19.64%
- Brown: 50–60% 60–70% 70–80% 80–90% >90% Rapoport: 40–50% 50–60%
U.S. Representative before election
Shontel Brown
Democratic
Elected U.S. Representative
Shontel Brown
Democratic

The 11th district takes in Cleveland and its inner suburbs, including Euclid, Cleveland Heights, and Warrensville Heights. The incumbent was Democrat Shontel Brown, who was re-elected with 77.75% of the vote in 2022. She was re-elected in 2024.

=== Democratic primary ===
==== Nominee ====
- Shontel Brown, incumbent U.S. representative

==== Endorsements ====
Shontel Brown

Political parties

- Ohio Democratic Party

Organizations

- AIPAC
- Cleveland Stonewall Democrats
- Feminist Majority PAC
- Giffords
- Humane Society Legislative Fund
- Jewish Democratic Council of America
- Joint Action Committee for Political Affairs
- Pro-Israel America
- Sierra Club

Labor unions

- National Education Association
- Ohio Federation of Teachers (post-primary)

==== Fundraising ====
Campaign finance reports as of February 28, 2024
Candidate	Raised	Spent	Cash on hand
Shontel Brown (D)	$759,993	$405,485	$680,030
Source: Federal Election Commission

=== Results ===
Democratic primary results
Party	Candidate	Votes	%
Democratic	Shontel Brown (incumbent)	61,573	100.0
Total votes		61,573	100.0

=== Republican primary ===
==== Nominee ====
- Alan Rapoport, former mayor of Cleveland Heights

==== Eliminated in primary ====
- James Hemphill, general contractor and candidate for this district in 2022
- Landry Simmons, police officer

=== Results ===
Republican primary results
Party	Candidate	Votes	%
Republican	Alan Rapoport	8,385	56.8
Republican	James Hemphill	3,350	22.7
Republican	Landry Simmons	3,024	20.5
Total votes		14,759	100.0

=== Independents ===
==== Declared ====
- Sean Freeman, financial analyst

=== Write-in candidates ===
==== Declared ====
- Tracy Deforde
- Christopher Zelonish

==== Fundraising ====
Campaign finance reports as of December 31, 2023
Candidate	Raised	Spent	Cash on hand
Sean Freeman (I)	$5,090	$4,281	$809
Source: Federal Election Commission

=== General election ===
==== Predictions ====
Source	Ranking	As of
Cook Political Report	Solid D	March 5, 2024
Inside Elections	Solid D	March 1, 2024
Sabato's Crystal Ball	Safe D	February 28, 2024
Elections Daily	Safe D	February 5, 2024
CNalysis	Solid D	March 12, 2024

==== Results ====
2024 Ohio's 11th congressional district election
Party	Candidate	Votes	%
Democratic	Shontel Brown (incumbent)	236,883	78.33
Republican	Alan Rapoport	59,394	19.64
Independent	Sean Freeman	6,107	2.02
Write-in		29	0.01%
Total votes		302,413	100.0
Democratic hold			

==== By county ====
County	Shontel Brown Democratic		Alan Rapoport Republican		Various candidates Other parties		Margin		Total
County	#	%	#	%	#	%	#	%	Total
Cuyahoga	236,883	78.33%	59,394	19.64%	6,136	2.03%	177,489	58.69%	302,413
Totals	236,883	78.33%	59,394	19.64%	6,136	2.03%	177,489	58.69%	302,413

== District 12 ==
2024 Ohio's 12th congressional district election
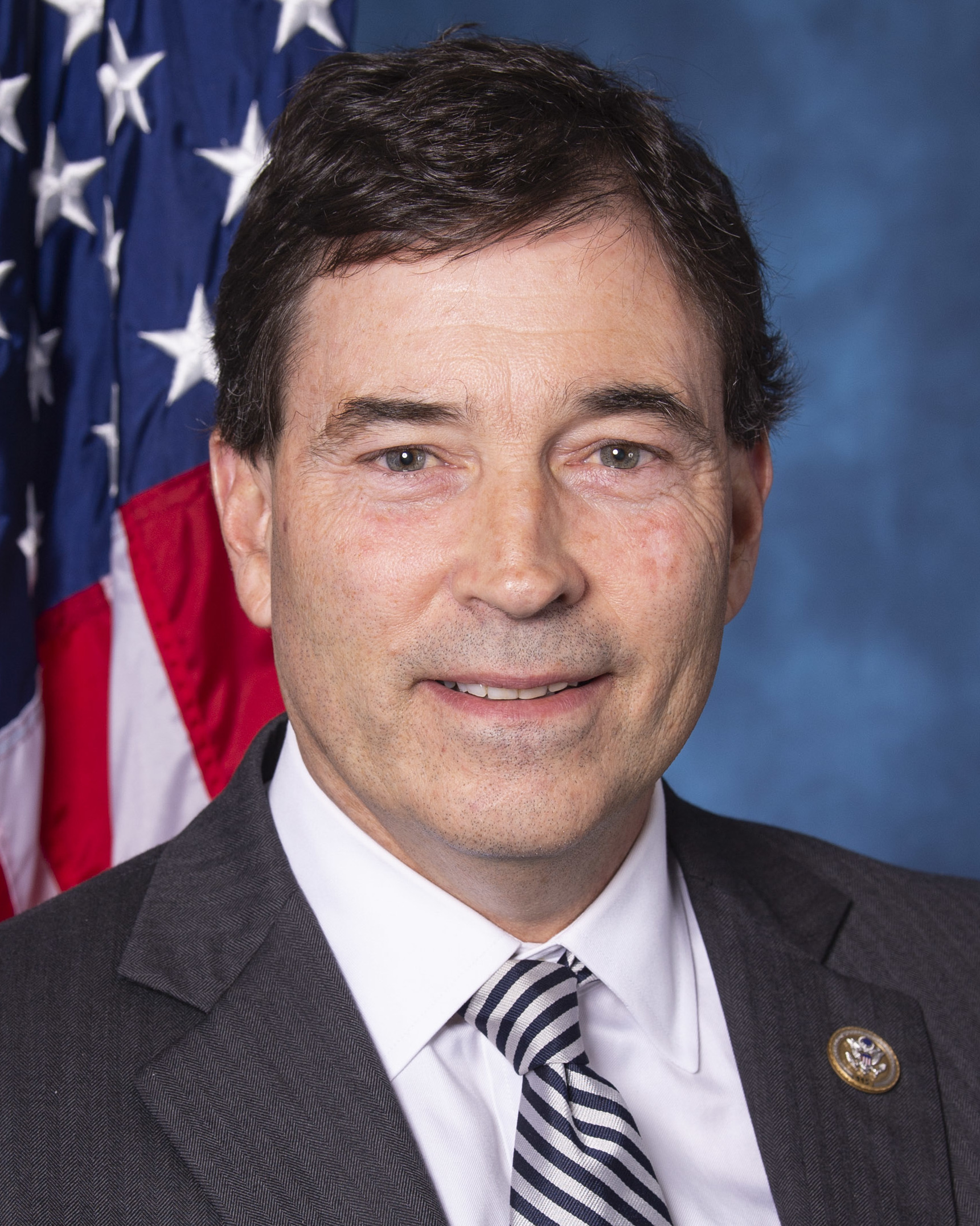

Nominee	Troy Balderson	Jerrad Christian
Party	Republican	Democratic
Popular vote	260,450	119,738
Percentage	68.51%	31.49%
- Balderson: 50–60% 60–70% 70–80% 80–90% >90% Christian: 50–60% 60–70% 70–80% 80–90% >90%
U.S. Representative before election
Troy Balderson
Republican
Elected U.S. Representative
Troy Balderson
Republican

The 12th district encompasses an area of Ohio east of the Columbus metro area, taking in Newark, and Zanesville, as well as Athens. The incumbent was Republican Troy Balderson, who was re-elected with 69.27% of the vote in 2022. He was re-elected in 2024.

=== Republican primary ===
==== Nominee ====
- Troy Balderson, incumbent U.S. representative

==== Endorsements ====
Troy Balderson

Organizations

- AIPAC
- National Rifle Association Political Victory Fund

==== Fundraising ====
Campaign finance reports as of February 28, 2024
Candidate	Raised	Spent	Cash on hand
Troy Balderson (R)	$1,112,821	$505,906	$1,010,707
Source: Federal Election Commission

=== Results ===
Republican primary results
Party	Candidate	Votes	%
Republican	Troy Balderson (incumbent)	81,263	100.0
Total votes		81,263	100.0

=== Democratic primary ===
==== Nominee ====
- Jerrad Christian, IT professional

==== Endorsements ====
Jerrad Christian

Individuals

- Howie Klein, former president of Reprise Records (1989–2001) and adjunct professor at McGill University
- Heather Digby Parton, political blogger

Organizations

- Vote Common Good

==== Fundraising ====
Campaign finance reports as of February 28, 2024
Candidate	Raised	Spent	Cash on hand
Jerrad Christian (D)	$74,861	$41,373	$33,488
Source: Federal Election Commission

=== Results ===
Democratic primary results
Party	Candidate	Votes	%
Democratic	Jerrad Christian	22,809	100.0
Total votes		22,809	100.0

=== General election ===
==== Predictions ====
Source	Ranking	As of
Cook Political Report	Solid R	March 5, 2024
Inside Elections	Solid R	March 1, 2024
Sabato's Crystal Ball	Safe R	February 28, 2024
Elections Daily	Safe R	February 5, 2024
CNalysis	Solid R	March 12, 2024

==== Results ====
2024 Ohio's 12th congressional district election
Party	Candidate	Votes	%
Republican	Troy Balderson (incumbent)	260,450	68.51
Democratic	Jerrad Christian	119,738	31.49
Total votes		380,188	100.0
Republican hold			

==== By county ====
County	Troy Balderson Republican		Jerrad Christian Democratic		Margin		Total
County	#	%	#	%	#	%	Total
Athens	10,764	43.50%	13,980	56.50%	−3,216	−13.00%	24,744
Coshocton	12,462	77.68%	3,580	22.32%	8,882	55.37%	16,042
Delaware	20,759	62.11%	12,662	37.89%	8,097	24.24%	33,421
Fairfield	52,020	63.90%	29,386	36.10%	22,634	27.80%	81,406
Guernsey	13,269	77.76%	3,795	22.24%	9,474	55.52%	17,064
Holmes	7,749	85.79%	1,284	14.21%	6,465	71.57%	9,033
Knox	22,920	73.51%	8,260	26.49%	14,660	47.03%	31,180
Licking	62,779	67.42%	30,337	32.58%	32,442	34.84%	93,116
Morgan	5,157	79.50%	1,330	20.50%	3,827	59.00%	6,487
Muskingum	29,938	76.93%	8,976	23.07%	20,962	53.87%	38,914
Perry	12,880	78.43%	3,543	21.57%	9,337	56.85%	16,423
Tuscarawas	9,753	78.92%	2,605	21.08%	7,148	57.84%	12,358
Totals	260,450	68.51%	119,738	31.49%	140,712	37.01%	380,188

== District 13 ==
2024 Ohio's 13th congressional district election
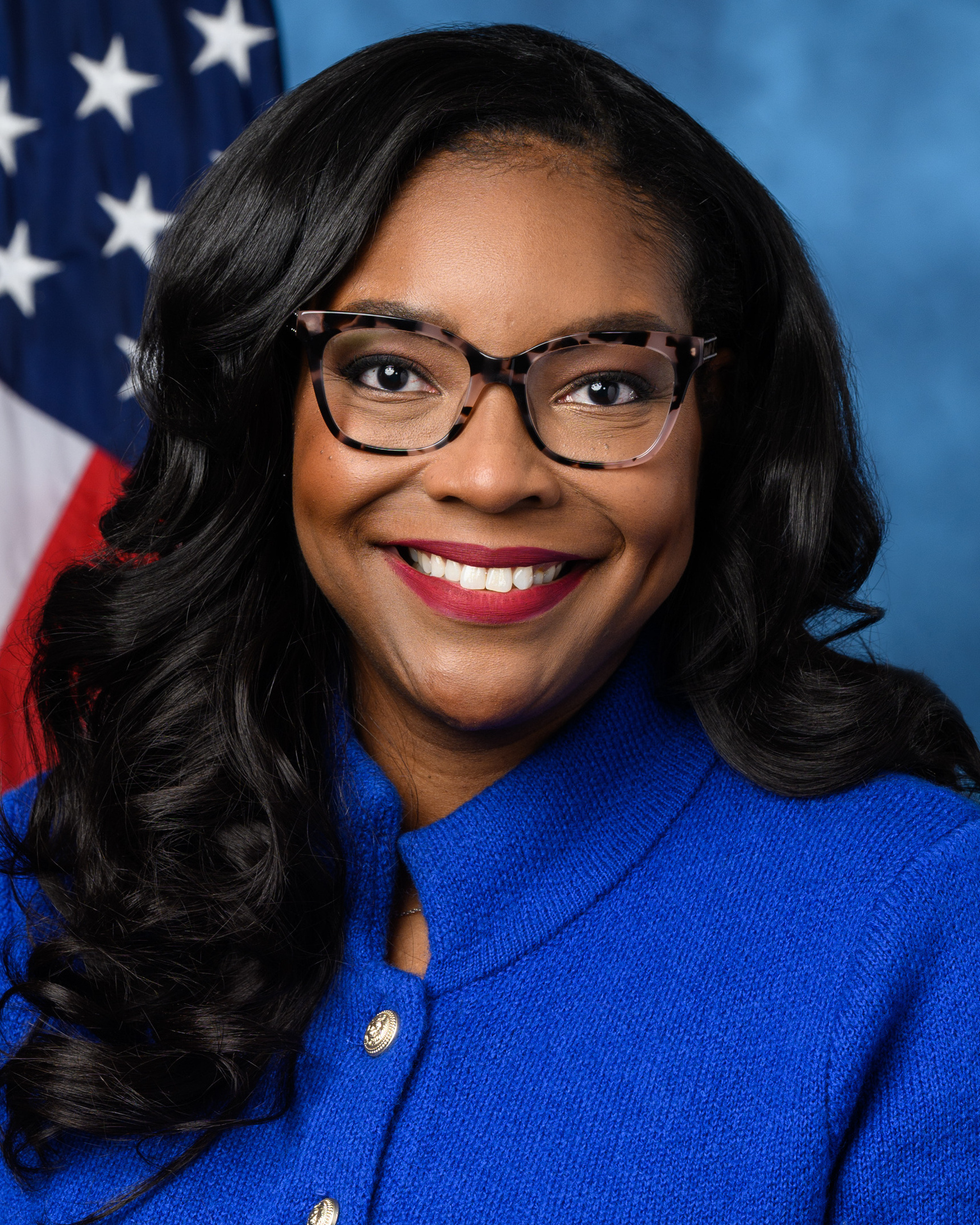

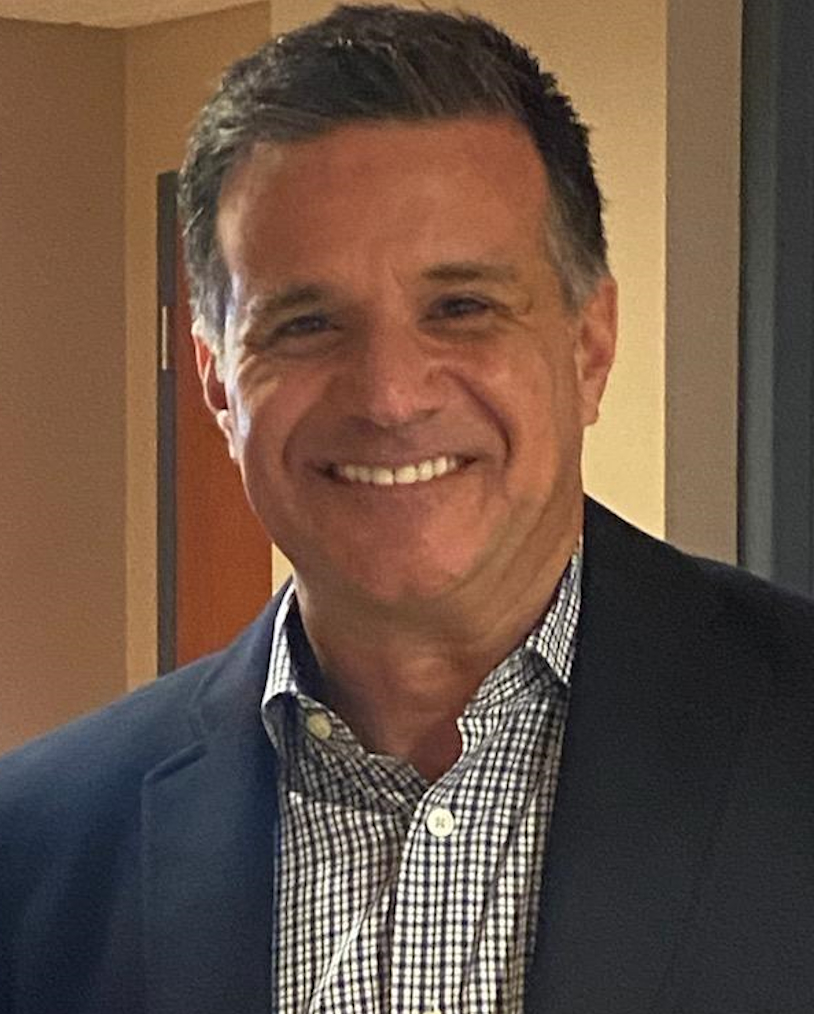
Nominee	Emilia Sykes	Kevin Coughlin
Party	Democratic	Republican
Popular vote	197,466	188,924
Percentage	51.11%	48.89%
- Sykes: 50–60% 60–70% 70–80% 80–90% >90% Coughlin: 50–60% 60–70% 70–80% 80–90% >90% Tie: 50%
U.S. Representative before election
Emilia Sykes
Democratic
Elected U.S. Representative
Emilia Sykes
Democratic

The 13th district includes most of the Akron-Canton population corridor, taking in all of Summit County and parts of Portage and Stark counties. The incumbent was Democrat Emilia Sykes, who was elected with 52.68% of the vote in 2022. She was re-elected in 2024.

=== Democratic primary ===
==== Nominee ====
- Emilia Sykes, incumbent U.S. representative

==== Endorsements ====
Emilia Sykes

Statewide officials

- Gretchen Whitmer, governor of Michigan (2019–present)

State legislators

- Adrian Boafo, Maryland's HD-23 (2023–present)

Political parties

- Ohio Democratic Party

Organizations

- AIPAC
- Bend the Arc
- Brady PAC
- Democratic Majority for Israel
- EMILY's List
- Everytown for Gun Safety Action Fund
- Feminist Majority PAC
- Giffords
- Humane Society Legislative Fund
- J Street PAC
- Jewish Democratic Council of America
- Joint Action Committee for Political Affairs
- League of Conservation Voters
- NARAL Pro-Choice America
- Planned Parenthood Action Fund
- Population Connection Action Fund
- Swing Left
- Vote Common Good

Labor unions

- National Education Association
- Ohio Federation of Teachers (post-primary)

==== Fundraising ====
Campaign finance reports as of February 28, 2024
Candidate	Raised	Spent	Cash on hand
Emilia Sykes (D)	$4,202,119	$1,412,966	$2,903,452
Source: Federal Election Commission

=== Results ===
Democratic primary results
Party	Candidate	Votes	%
Democratic	Emilia Sykes (incumbent)	41,257	100.0
Total votes		41,257	100.0

=== Republican primary ===
==== Nominee ====
- Kevin Coughlin, former state senator

==== Eliminated in primary ====
- Chris Banweg, at-large Hudson city councilor
- Richard Morckel, imaging technician, nominee for this district in 2016 and candidate in 2020

==== Withdrawn ====
- Madison Gesiotto Gilbert, lawyer, former Miss Ohio USA, and nominee for this district in 2022 (became national spokesperson for the Republican National Committee)
- Greg Wheeler, attorney and candidate for this district in 2022 (endorsed Banweg)

==== Declined ====
- Kristina Roegner, state senator
- Jane Timken, former chair of the Ohio Republican Party and candidate for U.S. Senate in 2022

==== Endorsements ====
Chris Banweg

U.S. senators

- JD Vance, Ohio (2023–2025)
Kevin Coughlin

U.S. representatives

- Bob Gibbs, OH-07 (2011–2023)
- Jim Jordan, OH-04 (2007–present)

Organizations

- Americans for Prosperity (post-primary)
- Congressional Leadership Fund (post-primary)

==== Fundraising ====
Campaign finance reports as of February 28, 2024
Candidate	Raised	Spent	Cash on hand
Chris Banweg (R)	$18,529 (Note: $10,000 of this total was self-funded by Banweg)	$163,819	$116,458
Kevin Coughlin (R)	$331,800 (Note: $150,000 of this total was self-funded by Coughlin)	$131,370	$200,429
Richard Morckel (R)	$497	$497	$100
Source: Federal Election Commission

=== Results ===
Republican primary results
Party	Candidate	Votes	%
Republican	Kevin Coughlin	39,378	65.0
Republican	Chris Banweg	16,703	27.6
Republican	Richard Morckel	4,496	7.4
Total votes		60,577	100.0

=== General election ===
==== Predictions ====
Source	Ranking	As of
Cook Political Report	Lean D	November 1, 2024
Inside Elections	Lean D	October 18, 2024
Sabato's Crystal Ball	Lean D	October 24, 2024
Elections Daily	Lean D	February 5, 2024
CNalysis	Lean D	March 12, 2024

==== Polling ====
Poll source	Date(s) administered	Sample size	Margin of error	Emilia Sykes (D)	Kevin Coughlin (R)	Other	Undecided
co/efficient (R) (Note: Poll sponsored by Coughlin's campaign)	October 22–24, 2024	707 (LV)	± 3.68%	45%	46%	–	8%
Cygnal (R) (Note: Poll sponsored by the National Republican Congressional Committee)	July 28–30, 2024	400 (LV)	± 4.89%	44%	40%	3% (Note: "Another candidate" with 3%)	13%

Hypothetical polling

Generic Republican vs. Generic Democrat

Poll source	Date(s) administered	Sample size	Margin of error	Generic Republican	Generic Democrat	Undecided
Cygnal (R) (Note: Poll commissioned by the Congressional Leadership Fund)	August 23–24, 2023	400 (LV)	± 4.9%	46%	45%	9%

Emilia Sykes vs. generic opponent

Poll source	Date(s) administered	Sample size	Margin of error	Emilia Sykes	Generic Opponent	Undecided
Cygnal (R)	August 23–24, 2023	400 (LV)	± 4.9%	39%	43%	18%

==== Results ====
2024 Ohio's 13th congressional district election
Party	Candidate	Votes	%
Democratic	Emilia Sykes (incumbent)	197,466	51.11
Republican	Kevin Coughlin	188,924	48.89
Total votes		386,390	100.0
Democratic hold			

==== By county ====
County	Emilia Sykes Democratic		Kevin Coughlin Republican		Margin		Total
County	#	%	#	%	#	%	Total
Portage	589	36.58%	1,021	63.42%	−432	−26.83%	1,610
Stark	50,852	43.27%	66,666	56.73%	−15,814	−13.46%	117,518
Summit	146,025	54.64%	121,237	45.36%	24,788	9.27%	267,262
Totals	197,466	51.11%	188,924	48.89%	8,542	2.21%	386,390

== District 14 ==
2024 Ohio's 14th congressional district election
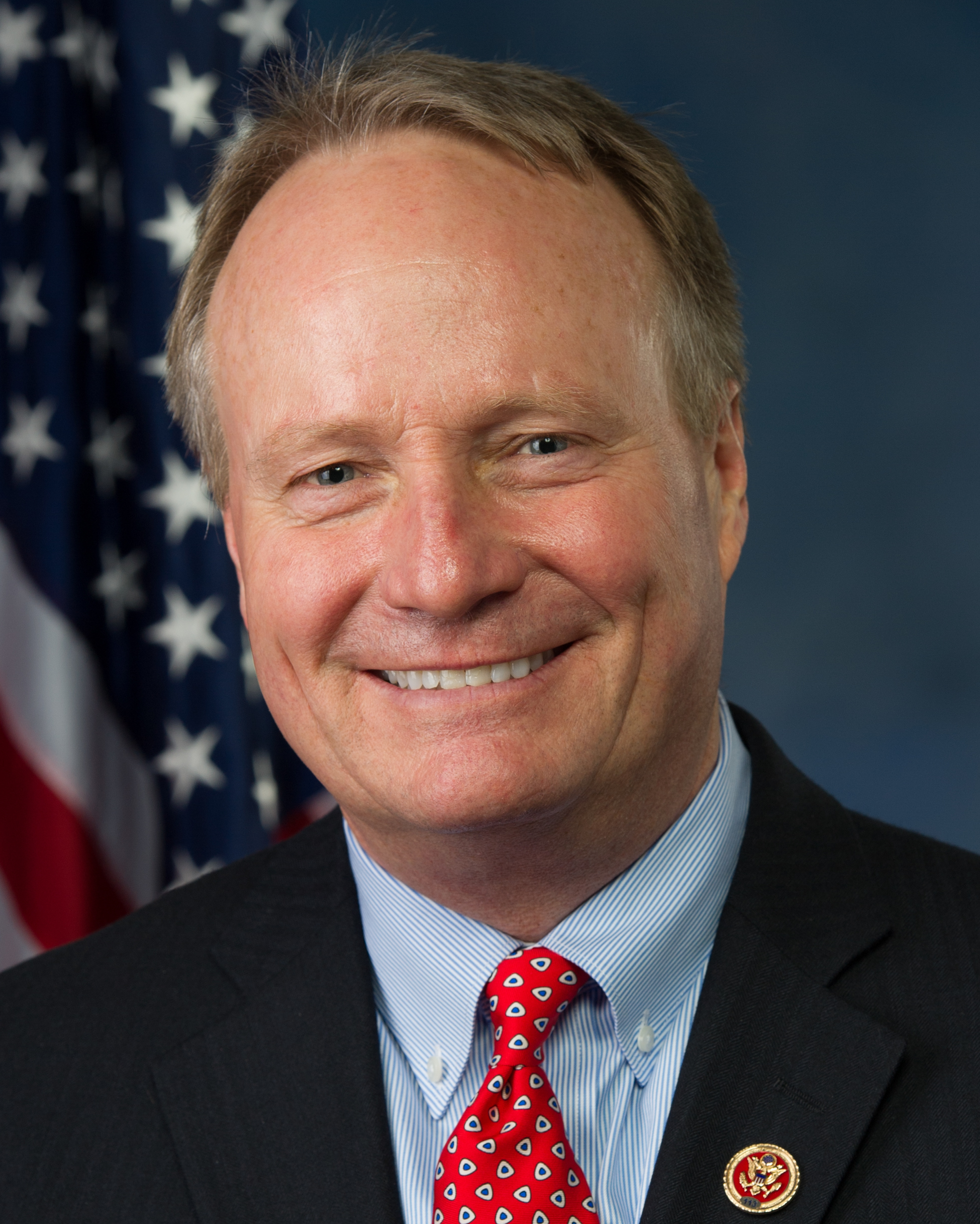

Nominee	David Joyce	Brian Kenderes
Party	Republican	Democratic
Popular vote	243,427	140,431
Percentage	63.42%	36.58%
- Joyce: 50–60% 60–70% 70–80% 80–90% >90% Kenderes: 50–60% 60–70% 70–80% 80–90% Tie: 50%
U.S. Representative before election
David Joyce
Republican
Elected U.S. Representative
David Joyce
Republican

The 14th district is located in Northeast Ohio, taking in the eastern suburbs and exurbs of Cleveland, Ohio. The incumbent was Republican David Joyce, who was re-elected with 61.74% of the vote in 2022. He was re-elected in 2024.

=== Republican primary ===
==== Nominee ====
- David Joyce, incumbent U.S. representative

==== Eliminated in primary ====
- Elayne Cross, podcast host and author
- Ken Polke, retired dentist and former quarterback for the Cleveland Browns and Miami Dolphins

==== Endorsements ====
David Joyce

Organizations

- AIPAC
- Humane Society Legislative Fund
- National Rifle Association Political Victory Fund

==== Fundraising ====
Campaign finance reports as of February 28, 2024
Candidate	Raised	Spent	Cash on hand
Elayne Cross (R)	$6,139 (Note: $3,780 of this total was self-funded by Cross)	$5,607	$532
David Joyce (R)	$1,324,921	$943,168	$2,211,675
Source: Federal Election Commission

=== Results ===
Republican primary results
Party	Candidate	Votes	%
Republican	David Joyce (incumbent)	61,785	76.7
Republican	Elayne Cross	10,562	13.1
Republican	Ken Polke	8,257	10.2
Total votes		80,604	100.0

=== Democratic primary ===
==== Nominee ====
- Brian Kenderes, soccer coach

=== Results ===
Democratic primary results
Party	Candidate	Votes	%
Democratic	Brian Kenderes	33,769	100.0
Total votes		33,769	100.0

=== General election ===
==== Predictions ====
Source	Ranking	As of
Cook Political Report	Solid R	March 5, 2024
Inside Elections	Solid R	March 1, 2024
Sabato's Crystal Ball	Safe R	February 28, 2024
Elections Daily	Safe R	February 5, 2024
CNalysis	Solid R	March 12, 2024

==== Results ====
2024 Ohio's 14th congressional district election
Party	Candidate	Votes	%
Republican	David Joyce (incumbent)	243,427	63.42
Democratic	Brian Kenderes	140,431	36.58
Total votes		383,858	100.0
Republican hold			

==== By county ====
County	David Joyce Republican		Brian Kenderes Democratic		Margin		Total
County	#	%	#	%	#	%	Total
Ashtabula	28,458	68.26%	13,233	31.74%	15,225	36.52%	41,691
Geauga	36,940	70.04%	15,804	29.96%	21,136	40.07%	52,744
Lake	76,814	63.68%	43,810	36.32%	33,004	27.36%	120,624
Portage	46,449	60.29%	30,593	39.71%	15,856	20.58%	77,042
Totals	243,427	63.42%	140,431	36.58%	102,996	26.83%	383,858

== District 15 ==
2024 Ohio's 15th congressional district election
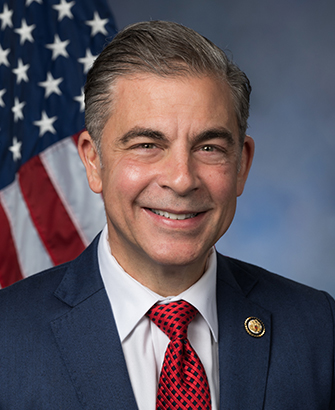

Nominee	Mike Carey	Adam Miller
Party	Republican	Democratic
Popular vote	196,338	151,411
Percentage	56.46%	43.54%
- Carey: 50–60% 60–70% 70–80% 80–90% >90% Miller: 50–60% 60–70% 70–80% 80–90%
U.S. Representative before election
Mike Carey
Republican
Elected U.S. Representative
Mike Carey
Republican

The 15th district encompasses the southwestern Columbus metro area, taking in the western, southern, and some northern suburbs of Columbus, including Dublin, Hilliard, and Grove City. The incumbent was Republican Mike Carey, who was re-elected with 56.96% of the vote in 2022. He was re-elected in 2024.

=== Republican primary ===
==== Nominee ====
- Mike Carey, incumbent U.S. representative

==== Endorsements ====
Mike Carey

Organizations

- AIPAC

==== Fundraising ====
Campaign finance reports as of February 28, 2024
Candidate	Raised	Spent	Cash on hand
Mike Carey (R)	$1,321,015	$703,705	$695,925
Source: Federal Election Commission

=== Results ===
Republican primary results
Party	Candidate	Votes	%
Republican	Mike Carey (incumbent)	51,073	100.0
Total votes		51,073	100.0

=== Democratic primary ===
==== Nominee ====
- Adam Miller, state representative and nominee for this district in 1998

==== Eliminated in primary ====
- Zerqa Abid, nonprofit executive

==== Endorsements ====
Adam Miller

Political parties

- Franklin County Democratic Party
- Ohio Democratic Party

Organizations

- Population Connection Action Fund

Labor unions

- Communications Workers of America
- Ohio Federation of Teachers (post-primary)

==== Fundraising ====
Campaign finance reports as of February 28, 2024
Candidate	Raised	Spent	Cash on hand
Zerqa Abid (D)	$208,437	$131,537	$76,899
Adam Miller (D)	$114,048 (Note: $81,250 of this total was self-funded by Miller)	$15,047	$99,000
Source: Federal Election Commission

=== Results ===
Democratic primary results
Party	Candidate	Votes	%
Democratic	Adam Miller	18,648	64.2
Democratic	Zerqa Abid	10,399	35.8
Total votes		29,047	100.0

=== General election ===
==== Predictions ====
Source	Ranking	As of
Cook Political Report	Solid R	March 5, 2024
Inside Elections	Solid R	March 1, 2024
Sabato's Crystal Ball	Safe R	February 28, 2024
Elections Daily	Safe R	February 5, 2024
CNalysis	Solid R	March 12, 2024

==== Results ====
2024 Ohio's 15th congressional district election
Party	Candidate	Votes	%
Republican	Mike Carey (incumbent)	196,338	56.46
Democratic	Adam Miller	151,411	43.54
Total votes		347,749	100.0
Republican hold			

==== By county ====
County	Mike Carey Republican		Adam Miller Democratic		Margin		Total
County	#	%	#	%	#	%	Total
Clark	21,340	74.70%	7,228	25.30%	14,112	49.40%	28,568
Fayette	9,010	79.24%	2,360	20.76%	6,650	58.49%	11,370
Franklin	104,588	46.31%	121,237	53.69%	−16,649	−7.37%	225,825
Madison	14,808	74.31%	5,120	25.69%	9,688	48.62%	19,928
Miami	34,659	73.41%	12,555	26.59%	22,104	46.82%	47,214
Shelby	11,933	80.39%	2,911	19.61%	9,022	60.78%	14,844
Totals	196,338	56.46%	151,411	43.54%	44,927	12.92%	347,749

== See also ==
- 2024 Ohio elections

== Notes ==
Partisan clients
