= Kevin Coughlin =

American politician (born 1970)

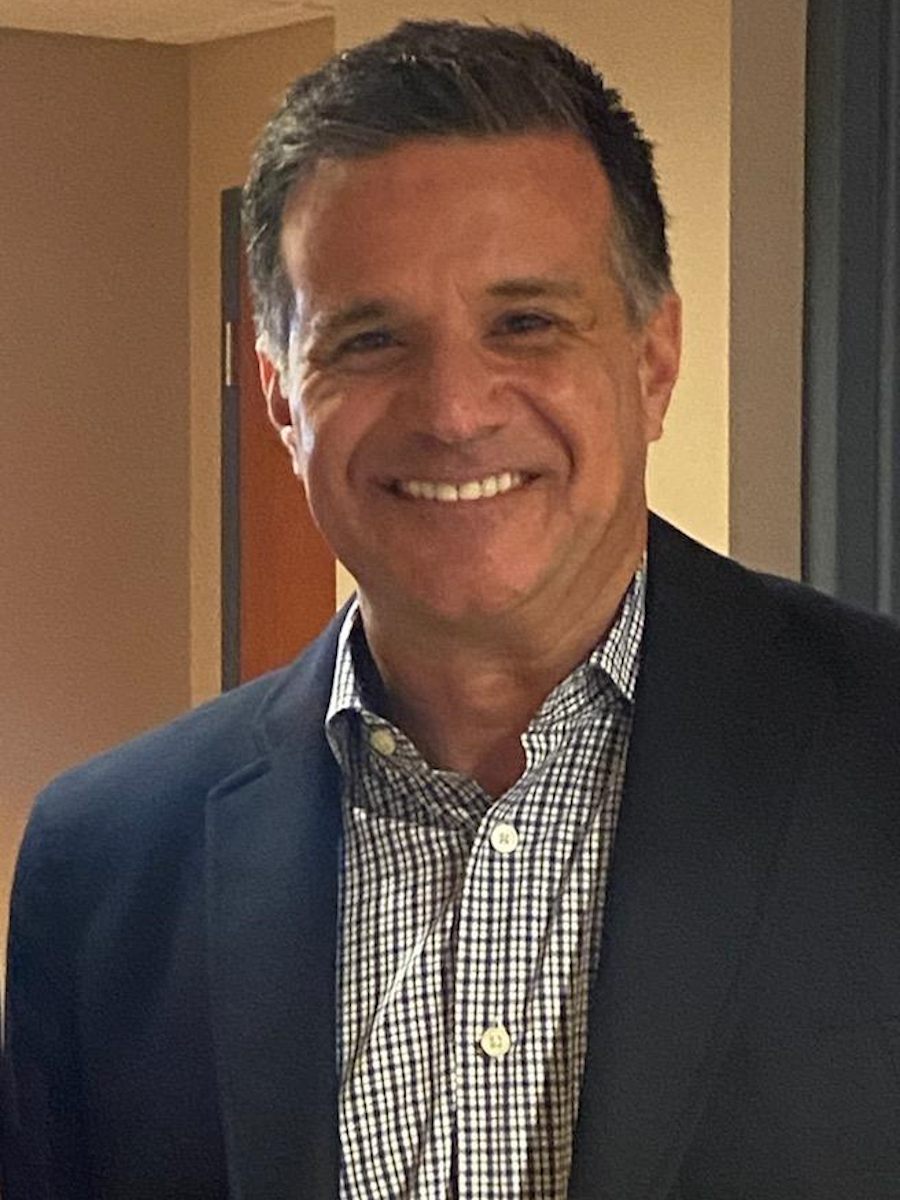
- Coughlin in 2024

Member of the Ohio Senate from the 27th district
- In office February 2, 2001 – December 31, 2010
- Preceded by: Roy Ray
- Succeeded by: Frank LaRose

Member of the Ohio House of Representatives from the 46th district
- In office January 3, 1997 – February 1, 2001
- Preceded by: Wayne Jones
- Succeeded by: John Widowfield

Personal details
- Born: May 13, 1970 (age 56) Mayfield Heights, Ohio, U.S.
- Party: Republican
- Education: Bowling Green State University (BA, MPA)
- Website: Campaign Website

Kevin J. Coughlin (born May 13, 1970) is a Republican former member of the Ohio Senate, who represented the 27th District from 2001 to 2010. He was a member of the Ohio House of Representatives from 1997 until 2000. He served as Clerk of the Stow Municipal Court from 2013 to 2015. Since 2010, he has been president of Lexington Companies, a marketing company.

Coughlin won the Republican nomination in the 2024 primary for Ohio's 13th congressional district. He was narrowly defeated by Democrat Emilia Sykes in the general election. Coughlin announced that he would seek a rematch with Sykes in the 2026 election before ultimately dropping out in November 2025.

== Life and career ==
Coughlin graduated from Woodridge High School in Peninsula, Ohio, in 1988, received a BA from Bowling Green State University in 1992, and a Master of Public Administration from BGSU in 1994. In 1996, he ran for the Ohio House of Representatives after Representative Wayne Jones vacated to run for the Ohio Senate. He won the seat, and was sworn into office on January 3, 1997. He won reelection in 1998 with 63.64%, and again in 2000 with 63.9% of the vote.

Coughlin served two and one half terms in the Ohio House of Representatives.

== Ohio Senate ==
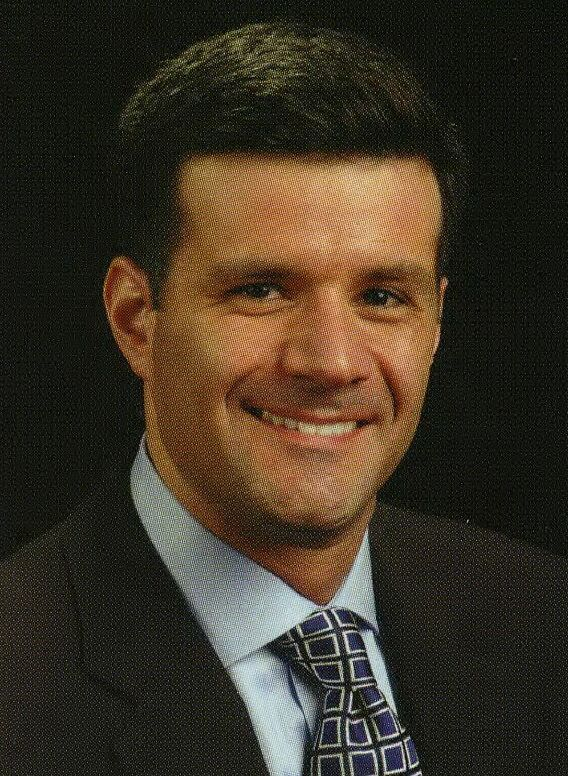
Coughlin during his tenure as a state senator, 2006

After four terms in the Ohio Senate, Senator Roy Ray retired early in 2001, leaving Senate Republicans to appoint someone to the vacant 27th District. Coughlin was appointed, and was sworn into office on February 2, 2001. He won his own four-year term in 2002 with 52.98% of the electorate against Democrat Tom Bevan. He won reelection in 2006 with 52.28% again Judy Hanna. In the Ohio Senate, Coughlin was Chairman of the Senate Health, Human Services, & Aging Committee from 2004 to 2011.

== Later career ==
In 2009, Coughlin considered running for Governor of Ohio. He declined to run after former Congressman John Kasich announced his candidacy.

Coughlin formed an exploratory committee to consider a run for United States Senate in 2012. In October 2011 he announced he would not run, citing incumbent Sherrod Brown's strong polling numbers.

Coughlin serves on the board of directors of the Ohio Capital Square Foundation and is a member of the Summit County Republican Executive Committee and Finance Committee. He lives in Bath Township, Ohio.

Coughlin is the Ohio chair for U.S. Term Limits.

== United States House of Representatives elections ==
=== 2024 ===
Coughlin easily defeated two opponents to win the 2024 primary to be the Republican candidate for Ohio's 13th congressional district in the United States House of Representatives. During the general election, he was narrowly defeated by incumbent Democrat Emilia Sykes.

=== 2026 ===
Coughlin was seeking a rematch with Sykes in the 2026 election. He dropped out of the race in November 2025 following a redistricting decision that made the district more favorable to incumbent Democrat Emilia Sykes.
