= Roy Ray =

American politician (born 1939)

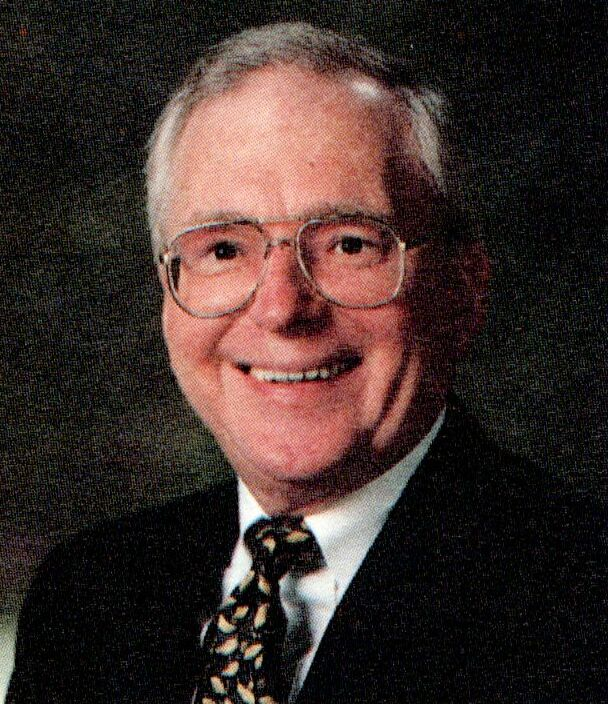

Member of the Ohio Senate from the 27th district
- In office January 2, 1987 – January 16, 2001
- Preceded by: Oliver Ocasek
- Succeeded by: Kevin Coughlin

Mayor of Akron, Ohio
- In office 1980–1983
- Preceded by: John S. Ballard
- Succeeded by: Tom C. Sawyer

Personal details
- Born: July 16, 1939 (age 87) Akron, Ohio
- Party: Republican

Roy Lee Ray (born July 16, 1939) was a member of the Ohio Senate, serving the 27th district from 1987 to 2001. His district encompassed portions of Akron. In 2001, he resigned and was succeeded by Kevin Coughlin. Ray served as Mayor of Akron from 1980 to 1983.

Ray successfully pushed for a change to the Seal of Ohio that reduced the number of rays from 17 (representing Ohio as the 17th state to enter into the union) to 13 (as reference to the Thirteen Colonies).

Ray was a member of the Phi Kappa Tau fraternity at the University of Akron.

Political offices
Preceded by John S. Ballard	Mayor of Akron, Ohio; 1980–1983	Succeeded by Thomas C. Sawyer
