= John S. Ballard =

American politician (1922–2012)

John Stuart Ballard

Mayor of Akron, Ohio
- In office 1966–1979
- Preceded by: Edward O. Erickson
- Succeeded by: Roy Ray

Personal details
- Born: September 30, 1922 Akron, Ohio, U.S.
- Died: April 21, 2012 (aged 89)
- Party: Republican
- Education: University of Akron; University of Michigan Law School
- Military career
- Allegiance: United States
- Branch: United States Army
- Service years: 1943–1946 (Army)
- Rank: Lieutenant
- Unit: General Patton's army in Africa
- Conflicts: World War II

John Stuart Ballard (September 30, 1922 – April 21, 2012) was an American politician known for serving as the mayor of Akron, Ohio, for 13 years from 1966 until 1979. He was elected and reelected in 1963, 1967, 1971, and 1975 to become Akron's longest serving mayor until Don Plusquellic served as mayor from 1987 until 2015.

Ballard also served as Summit County prosecutor between 1957 and 1964. Ballard was a graduate from the University of Akron and the University of Michigan Law School. Ballard was a member of the Phi Kappa Tau fraternity at the University of Akron. During World War II, he served as an infantry lieutenant in General Patton's army. He also worked as a special agent with the FBI and practiced law in Akron. As mayor of Akron, Ballard faced great challenges with the city losing 14 percent of its population in the 1970s along with race riots, labor strikes, and Vietnam War tension. When he was elected, Ballard was the first Republican mayor of Akron since 1951.

== See also ==
- List of mayors of Akron, Ohio
