= Marsham (surname) =

Marsham is a surname. Notable people with the surname include:

- Dame Joan Marsham (1888–1972), British philanthropist
- John Marsham (cricketer) (1842–1926), English clergyman and cricketer
- Robert Marsham (1708–1797), founder of phenology
- Thomas Marsham (died 1819), English entomologist
- Walter Marsham (1869–1945), English cricketer, the son of John Marsham

A family of cricketers:

- Algernon Marsham (1919–2004)
- C. H. B. Marsham (1879–1928)
- C. D. B. Marsham (1835–1915)
- Charles Marsham (1829–1901)
- George Marsham (1849–1927)
- Robert Marsham (cricketer) (1833–1913)

The family name of the Earl of Romney and their predecessors the Baronets of Cuckston and Barons Romney:

- Sir John Marsham, 1st Baronet (1602–1685)
- Sir Robert Marsham, 4th Baronet (1650–1703)
- Robert Marsham, 1st Baron Romney (1685–1724)
- Charles Marsham, 1st Earl of Romney (1744–1811)
- Charles Marsham, 2nd Earl of Romney (1777–1845)
- Charles Marsham, 3rd Earl of Romney (1808–1874)
- Charles Marsham, 4th Earl of Romney (1841–1905)
- Michael Marsham, 7th Earl of Romney (1910–2004)
- Julian Marsham, 8th Earl of Romney (born 1948)

== See also ==
- Marsham, Norfolk
- Marshman
