= Henry Hoare (disambiguation) =

Henry Hoare was an English banker and garden owner-designer.

Henry Hoare may also refer to:

- Henry Hoare (banker) (1677–1725), his father
- Henry Hoare of Mitcham Grove (1750–1828), English banker
- Henry Hoare (MCC cricketer, 1823) (1784–1836), English cricketer
- Henry Hoare (cricketer, born 1812) (1812–1859), English cricketer for MCC and brewer
- Henry Hoare (cricketer, born 1844) (1844–1931), cricketer for Oxford University
- Henry Hoare (1807–1866), English banker, and lay activist for the Church of England, grandson of Henry Hoare of Mitcham Grove
- Sir Henry Hugh Hoare, 3rd Baronet (1762–1841), banker
- Sir Henry Hoare, 5th Baronet (1824–1894), banker and politician
- Sir Henry Hugh Arthur Hoare, 6th Baronet (1865–1947), English landowner
