= Charles Hoare =

Charles Hoare may refer to:

- Charles Hoare (banker) (1767–1851), senior partner of C. Hoare & Co
- Charles Hoare (priest) (1781–1865), evangelical Church of England clergyman, archdeacon of Surrey
- Charles Hoare (cricketer, born 1819) (1819–1869), English cricketer
- Charles Hoare (cricketer, born 1847) (1847–1908), English cricketer and banker
- Charles Hoare (cricketer, born 1851) (1851–1935), English cricketer
- Sir Tony Hoare (Charles Antony Richard Hoare, 1934–2026), British computer scientist
- Charles Hoare (born 1971) of the Hoare baronets
