= Robert Marsham (disambiguation) =

Robert Marsham (1708–1797) was an English naturalist.

Robert Marsham may also refer to:

- Sir Robert Marsham, 4th Baronet (1650–1703), English MP for Maidstone
- Robert Marsham, 1st Baron Romney (1685–1724), formerly 5th Baronet
- Robert Marsham, 2nd Baron Romney (1712–1793), British peer and patron of the arts
- Robert Bullock Marsham (1786–1880), English academic, Warden of Merton College, Oxford
- Robert Marsham (cricketer) (1833–1913), English barrister, magistrate and cricketer
