= Cloudesley Marsham =

Cloudesley Marsham may refer to:

- C. D. B. Marsham (1835–1915), Oxford University cricketer
- C. H. B. Marsham (1879–1928), his son, Oxford University and Kent cricketer
