= George Hoare =

English brewer and cricketer (1779–1852)

George Matthew Hoare (19 April 1779 – 28 July 1852, in Brighton) was an English brewer and amateur cricketer.

== Brewery ==
Hoare was the third son of the banker Henry Hoare of Mitcham Grove, and his wife Lydia Henrietta Malortie. He was a partner in the Red Lion Brewhouse in East Smithfield, from 1802. His father had bought the business, and it later became Hoare and Co.

The Hoare & Co. brewery existed until 1934, and for a number of generations was passed down in the Hoare family. Following a string of acquisitions after World War I, it was taken over by Charrington Brewery in 1933, and closed down the year after. Charringtons adopted Hoare's toby jug trademark. With its 1967 merger with Bass Brewery, the Bass red triangle trademark incorporated a toby jug profile.

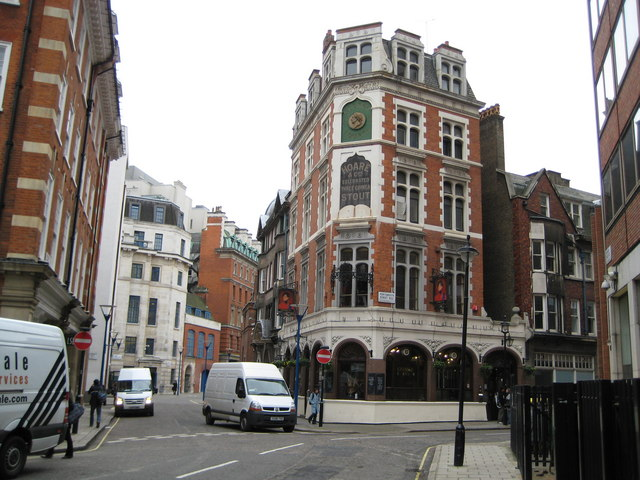
London pub with surviving Hoare and Co. publicity for stout

== Cricket ==
Hoare as a cricketer was mainly associated with Surrey and he made five known appearances in high-level matches from 1807 to 1812.

== Family ==
Hoare married in 1810 Angelina Frances Greene, daughter of James Greene of Lancashire; they had nine children. His sons Charles Hugh Hoare and Henry James Hoare, his grandson Charles Twysden Hoare, and a great-nephew Henry William Hoare, all played cricket.

With his wife, Hoare was commemorated in a painted glass window at St Lawrence Church, Morden.

== External sources ==
- CricketArchive record
