= Robert Darling =

Robert Darling may refer to:

- Robert Darling (cricketer) (1880–1956), Scottish cricketer
- Robert G. Darling, United States Navy Medical Corps officer and presidential physician
- Robert J. Darling, American author, public speaker and retired lieutenant colonel in the United States Marine Corps.

== See also ==
- Bobby Darling, trans Indian actress
- Robert and Julia Darling House, a historic house in Simsbury, Connecticut
