= Henry Hoare (1807–1866) =

English banker and lay Anglican activist (1807–1866)

Henry Hoare (1807–1866) was an English banker, a partner in Hoare's Bank. One of numerous family members of the name, he is called Henry Hoare of Staplehurst, after his Kent estate. He is now known as a lay activist for the Church of England, particularly concerned with the revival of Convocation, dormant since the early 18th century.

== Background and early life ==
He was the eldest son of the banker William Henry Hoare (1776–1819) and his wife, Louisa Elizabeth Noel, daughter of Sir Gerard Noel, 2nd Baronet; the cleric William Henry Hoare (1809–1888) was the second son. Their paternal grandfather was the banker Henry Hoare of Mitcham Grove, who died in 1828.

Mary Jane Kinnaird (1816–1888) was the sixth and youngest child in the family, born in 1816: their mother died later that year, and her elder brother Henry eventually became her guardian. Another sister was Louisa Elizabeth (c.1813–1884), who married in 1836 Peter John Locke King. The other siblings were Gerard Noel (born 1811), naval officer and brewer, who made a first cousin marriage to Sophia Lilias O'Brien, sister of Augustus Stafford; and Elizabeth Lydia (1814–1832), who did not marry.

William Henry Hoare wrote about the family background for the Memoir of Henry Hoare published in 1869. Their early life was in the heartland of the Clapham Sect, at Broomfield House where William Wilberforce had lived, and with Henry Thornton as a neighbour. The orphaned children had as governess Miss Holloway, who had worked in the Noel family; she was sister of the Rev. James Thomas Holloway of the Fitzroy Episcopal Chapel. They moved with her to their grandfather at Mitcham Grove.

== Education ==
With Samuel Wilberforce, Hoare was a pupil in 1819 at Stanstead Park, near Racton in Sussex, of George Hodson, at that time chaplain to Lewis Way. Hodson was tutoring Albert Way, but gathered a small class of six boys, who included James Thomason. In 1820 Hodson moved to Maisemore near Gloucester as a curate, taking pupils with him. Hoare apparently stayed with Hodson to age 16, judging by a farewell letter in the Memoir.

Hoare matriculated at St John's College, Cambridge in 1824, graduating B.A. in 1828; M.A. in 1831. An influence on him from his time at Cambridge was the preaching of Hugh James Rose. He was brought into Hoare's Bank on graduating, and took charge of the estate of Henry Hoare of Mitcham Grove who died that year. With his brother William, and Barton Shuttleworth, he made a continental tour in 1831. Shuttleworth was a cleric and a tutor in the Hoare family, found a position there by Thomas Drake (1745–1819), vicar of Rochdale, around 1794, after his father of the same name died the incumbent of Littleborough.

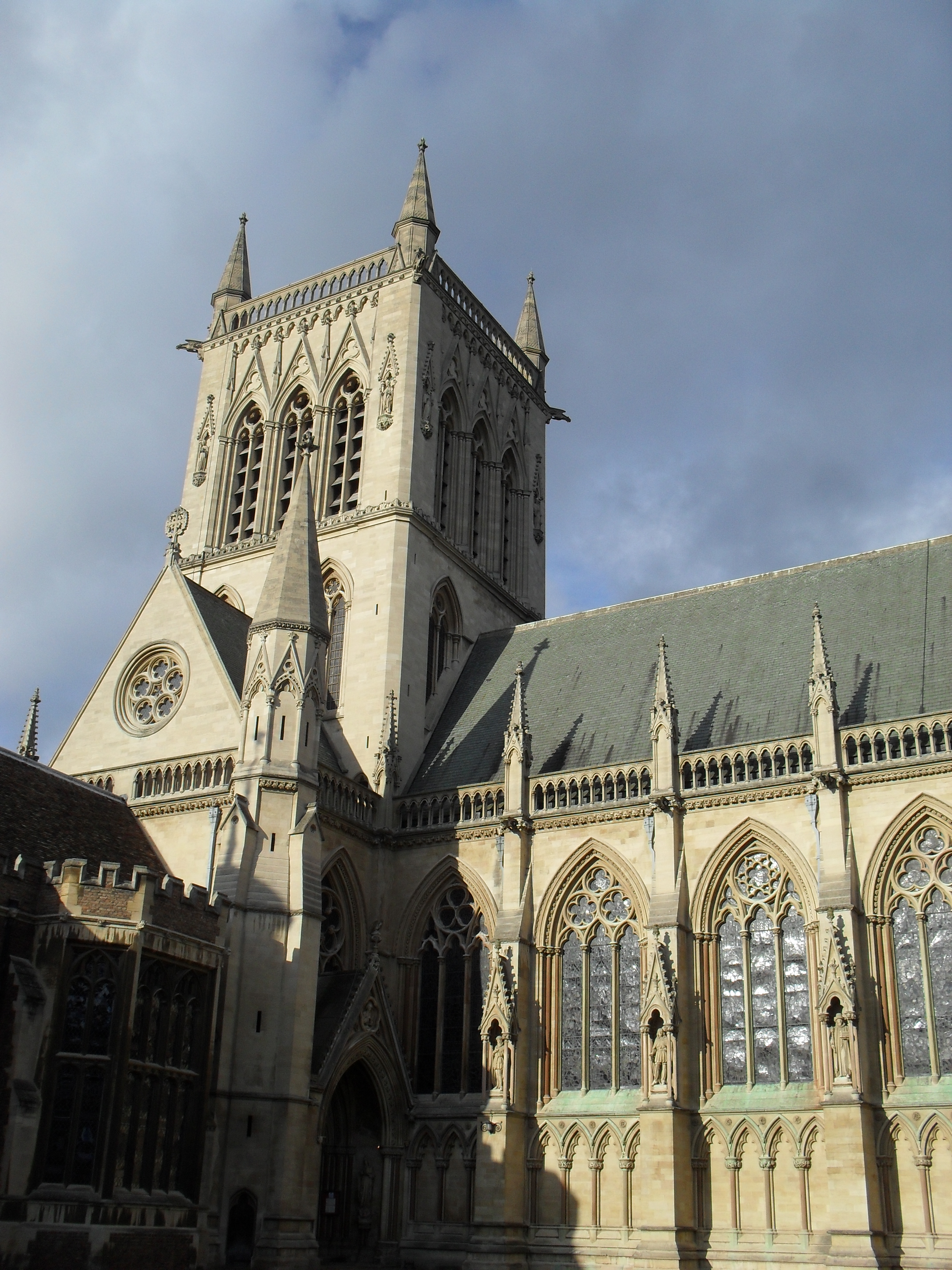
The tower of St John's College Chapel, Cambridge, the construction of which was prompted by, and partially funded by, Henry Hoare

== Staplehurst ==
There was family property at Staplehurst, a village in the Weald country of Kent south of Maidstone. Hoare was on good terms with the rector there from 1826, Thomas Waldron Hornbuckle (died 1848), a Fellow of St John's College, Cambridge. At this period much of his grandfather's fortune was tied up in the London brewery in East Smithfield run by his uncle, George Matthew Hoare. He began to build a family home just outside Staplehurst: by 1868 Staplehurst Place was described as a "fine timber mansion". He started living at Staplehurst shortly before his marriage of 1836, close to his brother William at Ashurst Park near Tunbridge Wells.

Hoare was High Sheriff of Kent in 1842. He became a partner in Hoare's Bank, of Fleet Street, London, in 1845, remaining until 1865. After the death of his cousin Charles Hoare in 1851, the bank had just two partners, Henry and Peter Richard Hoare the younger (1803–1877), son of Charles's younger brother Peter Richard (1772–1849). Henry in 1852 became treasurer of the Incorporated Church Building Society, continuing a close alliance of the bank with the bricks-and-mortar of the Church of England.

In 1864 Hoare laid the foundation stone of the new chapel built for St John's College by George Gilbert Scott. He had friends in his old college, William Henry Bateson and George Fearns Reyner, but his presence was fortuitous, Lord Powis being unable to come. It resulted in a proposal to add a tower to the chapel. Over objections from George Bonney, the College agreed to an instalment plan under which Hoare would fund the tower, in five annual payments.

After being injured in a rail accident in March 1865, Hoare died on 16 April 1866, at Staplehurst. The chapel tower plan was financed for only 40% of the cost, when Henry Hoare the younger, the heir, wished the remainder to be conditional on the sale to him by the College of the advowson of Staplehurst, which the College would not countenance. Reyner retired to the living: the heir had wished to present it to his clerical brother, Walter Marsham Hoare.

== Lay co-operation ==
In later life, Hoare ran a long and consistent campaign to involve laymen in Church of England affairs. Its success was recognised by William Hale, and by 1860 there were two prominent examples of his projects, the Committee of Laymen and the Church Institution. His own religious views were from an evangelical upbringing, tempered by High Church sympathies acquired from the Tracts for the Times.

The Society for the Revival of Convocation was formed in 1850, and was chaired by Hoare. One of the issues provoking its foundation was the Privy Council judgement in the Gorham case, earlier that year. The restoration of the Catholic hierarchy in England also occurred shortly before it was set up, later in the year. Adopting the Protestant language of the "papal aggression", Hoare argued that in the move was to be seen also the "crippled state of the Church of England".

The Church Dictionary edited by Walter Farquhar Hook considered that Hoare and Samuel Wilberforce were the prime movers in the agitation that saw Convocation revived, while the Archbishops John Bird Sumner and Thomas Musgrave disapproved. It also records the argument that the emancipation of the Jews in the United Kingdom, topical in 1850, and of other groups, had affected the suitability of parliament as decision-maker in matters concerning the Church of England. Convocation had been dormant since 1717 and the Bangorian controversy, when it had been prorogued to shield Benjamin Hoadley from High Church criticism. With both Tractarian and evangelical support, the Convocations of Canterbury and York began again, in 1852 and 1861 respectively.

A clerical ally for Hoare was William Emery, who in 1850 was a Fellow of Corpus Christi College, Cambridge. They worked together on the revival of Convocation. In 1852 Hoare met William Broughton, the Bishop of Australia; an influence on Hoare's ideas about lay participation in diocesan synods, according to his biographer James Bradby Sweet.

== Family ==
Hoare married in 1836 Lady Mary Marsham, daughter of Charles Marsham, 2nd Earl of Romney. They had 12 children:

- Mary Sophia (born 1837), eldest child, married 1862 the Rev. Thomas William Onslow Hallward.
- Henry Hoare (1838–1898), eldest son, banker, married in 1865 Beatrice Ann Paley, daughter of the Rev. George Barber Paley.
- Cecilia Elizabeth (1839–1863), second daughter, unmarried.
- Walter Marsham Hoare (1840–1912), second son, cleric. He rowed for Oxford in 1863 Boat Race. He married in 1867 Jessie Mary Robertson, daughter of Richard Ignatius Robertson, and was father of Arthur Robertson Hoare.
- Caroline Charlotte (1841– ), third daughter.
- Angelina Margaret Hoare (1843–1892), fourth daughter, known for her work on female education in India.
- Charles Hoare (1844–1898), third son, banker, married 1872 Katherine Georgina Hervey, daughter of Lord Arthur Charles Hervey.
- William Hoare (1847–1925), fourth son, banker and brewer, an amateur cricketer for the Gentlemen of Kent, married 1878 Laura Lennard, daughter of Sir John Farnaby Lennard, 1st Baronet.
- Sophia Louisa, fifth daughter.
- Alfred Hoare (1850–1938), fifth son, surgeon and banker.
- Katharine, sixth daughter.
- Hugh Edward Hoare (born 1854), sixth son, politician and brewer.
