= C. H. B. Marsham =

English cricketer (1879–1928)

Cloudesley Marsham
Personal information
- Full name: Cloudesley Henry Bullock Marsham
- Born: 10 February 1879; Stoke Lyne, Oxfordshire
- Died: 19 July 1928 (aged 49); Wrotham Heath, Kent
- Nickname: Slug
- Batting: Right-handed

Domestic team information
- Years: Team
- 1900–1922: Kent
- 1900–1902: Oxford University

Career statistics
Competition	First-class
Matches	175
Runs scored	5,879
Batting average	22.61
100s/50s	7/26
Top score	161*
Balls bowled	194
Wickets	2
Bowling average	87.50
5 wickets in innings	0
10 wickets in match	0
Best bowling	1/0
Catches/stumpings	88/–
- Source: ESPNcricinfo, 8 April 2016

Cloudesley Henry Bullock Marsham (10 February 1879 – 19 July 1928), also known as Slug Marsham, was an English amateur cricketer. Primarily a batsman, he played for Kent County Cricket Club between 1900 and 1922 and is most notable for having captained Kent to the county's first County Championship title in 1906. Marsham served as a captain in the West Kent Yeomanry during the First World War.

== Early life ==
Marsham was born in Stoke Lyne near Bicester in Oxfordshire in 1879. He was born into a well-established cricketing family which had been associated with Kent cricket for over a century. His father, Cloudesley Dewar Bullock Marsham, played for Oxford University, the Gentlemen, Marylebone Cricket Club (MCC) and England and was described as "the best Gentleman bowler of his day". His uncles Charles and Robert played first-class cricket for Oxford University, another uncle (George) appeared for Kent, and his brother Francis played for both Kent and Oxford University. His son Algernon would go on to play for them both too.

Marsham grew up in Harrietsham and was sent to Eton College in 1892, where he played for the school First XI. He played in two Eton v Harrow fixtures, before going on to study at Christ Church, Oxford. He played for Oxford University from 1900 to 1902, winning his Blue in 1900, and captaining the team in 1902, his final year at university. He played in Varsity Matches for the university, scoring 100 not out in 1901, saving the game for Oxford in the process.

== Cricket career ==
Marsham combined playing for Oxford with appearances for Kent, making his debut in 1900 against Nottinghamshire. He was capped in 1902 and succeeded Cuthbert Burnup as captain of Kent at the start of the 1904 season. In 1906 he led Kent to their first County Championship title. The Daily Mail wrote of him "Kent have a captain who, although young in years, possesses the judgement of a veteran", while Wisden told of how he "inspired his men by fine example". He played most frequently for the county whilst he was captain, although he was part of three County Championship winning teams. In 1908 he became the first Kent player to be appointed a Test selector.

Marsham was described by Wisden as "a good, but not a great batsman". He was capable of fine batting under pressure and played effectively on the off-side. He scored over 1,000 runs in both 1904 and 1908 and made seven first-class centuries in his career. After 1909 he dropped out of first-class cricket, playing only sporadically until 1922 when he made his final first-class appearance, captaining Kent in the absence of Lionel Troughton. In total Marsham played 140 matches for Kent, averaging 21.13 with the bat. Other than Oxford, he also made first-class appearances for teams such as MCC and The Gentlemen.

== Military career ==
Marsham joined the Queen's Own West Kent Yeomanry (WKY), a Territorial Force cavalry unit, in 1902 as a 2nd lieutenant, being promoted to 1st lieutenant in 1909. At the start of World War I the WKY mobilised at Canterbury and began training as part of the South Eastern Mounted Brigade. In September 1915 the WKY sailed from Liverpool to take part in the Gallipoli campaign. After a short spell with the Yeomanry Base Depot on Lemnos, Marsham joined his unit on the front line, serving dismounted as part of the 42nd (East Lancashire) Infantry Division. He was evacuated with the WKY from Cape Helles in December 1915, moving to defend the Suez Canal in Egypt in 1916.

In 1916 Marsham took part in operations against the Senussi in Egypt before the WKY embarked on a period of intensive retraining as a dedicated infantry unit during which they amalgamated with the Royal East Kent Mounted Rifles to form the 10th Battalion of the Buffs. In March 1917 he was promoted to acting major before his battalion took part in the Palestine campaign, including serving as a reserve unit during the First Battle of Gaza. Marsham was taken ill shortly afterwards and returned to England in July 1917. He served the remainder of the war in Britain, being attached to the RAF Cadet Brigade in October 1918 and the Irish Command Headquarters in March 1919. He relinquished his commission in September 1921 after having been transferred to the Territorial Force Reserve Depot in April 1919. He retained the rank of captain.

== Personal life ==
Marsham worked as a land agent prior to World War I and in 1911 married Algitha Parker at Malpas, Cheshire. After World War I he played club cricket for the Mote until his death in Wrotham Heath in 1928, aged 49.

== Bibliography ==
- Carlaw, Derek (2020). Kent County Cricketers, A to Z: Part One (1806–1914) (PDF). Cardiff: ACS.

Sporting positions
Preceded by Cuthbert Burnup	Kent County Cricket Club captain 1904 – 1908	Succeeded by Ted Dillon
