= Marsham =

Marsham may refer to:

- Marsham (surname)
- Marsham, Norfolk, an English village
- Rabbi Sholom Mordechai Schwadron known by the acronym "Marsham" which is the Hebrew abbreviation of the initials Moreinu Rav Sholom Mordechai)

== See also ==
- Marsham Street, street in Westminster, London, England
