= William Hoare (cricketer, born 1847) =

English cricketer, cricket administrator, banker and brewer

Personal information
- Full name: William Hoare
- Born: 15 September 1847; Westminster, London, England
- Died: 22 July 1925 (aged 77); Benenden, Kent, England
- Batting: Unknown
- Relatives: Arthur Hoare (nephew)

Career statistics
Competition	First-class
Matches	1
Runs scored	9
Batting average	9.00
100s/50s	–/–
Top score	9
Catches/stumpings	3/–
- Source: Cricinfo, 23 July 2020

William Hoare (15 September 1847 – 22 July 1925) was an English first-class cricketer, cricket administrator, banker and brewer.

The son of Henry Hoare and Lady Mary Marsham, he was born at Westminster in September 1847. He was educated at Eton College, before going up to St John's College, Cambridge. After graduating from Cambridge, he went into the family businesses, becoming a partner at Hoares Bank and at Hoare & Co. Brewery which was based in the Docklands. Hoare later made a single appearance in first-class cricket for the Gentlemen of Kent against the Gentlemen of England at Canterbury in 1879. He was absent in the Gentlemen of Kent first innings, but did bat in their second innings, scoring 9 runs before being dismissed by W. G. Grace. He was elected president of Kent County Cricket Club in 1900. Hoare died at Benenden in July 1925. His nephew, Arthur Hoare, also played first-class cricket.
