= George Marsham =

English cricketer and landowner

George Marsham (10 April 1849 – 2 December 1927) was an English landowner and amateur cricketer who was connected with Kent County Cricket Club.

Marsham was born at Allington Rectory near Maidstone in Kent in 1849, the son of George F. J. Marsham who was the rector of the parish. He came from a cricketing family: his nephew, C. H. B. Marsham, captained Kent between 1904 and 1908 and was captain when the county won its first County Championship in 1906 and his brothers-in-law Charles, Robert and Cloudesley all played first-class cricket.

Marsham was one of seven siblings and the only son to survive infancy. His mother died in childbirth and his father died three years afterwards, so the children grew up at Hayle Place in Loose near Maidstone with his mother's family. After being educated at Eton College, where he played some cricket, and Merton College, Oxford where he matriculated in 1867, Marsham played three first-class matches for Kent between 1877 and 1878. He was President of the club in 1886 and was also a prominent member of I Zingari, Band of Brothers and the Old Stagers. Wisden described him as a "useful batsman and a good wicket-keeper", who could also bowl slow underarm.

Marsham inherited Hayle Place from his aunt Catherine Penelope Jones as well as property at Headfort House in County Leitrim, Ireland. He was High Sheriff of Leitrim in 1878 and a Deputy Lieutenant of both Leitrim and Kent as well as a Justice of the Peace. He never married and lived at Hayle Cottage on the Hayle Place estate until his death in 1927 aged 78.
