= Arthur Hoare (cricketer, born 1871) =

English cricketer and clergyman (1871–1941)

Personal information
- Full name: Arthur Robertson Hoare
- Born: 17 October 1871; Stibbard, Norfolk, England
- Died: 18 March 1941 (aged 69); Ashill, Norfolk, England
- Batting: Right-handed
- Bowling: Right-arm medium
- Relatives: William Hoare (uncle); Walter Marsham (brother-in-law); John Marsham (father-in-law)

Domestic team information
- Years: Team
- 1895–1907: Norfolk
- 1903: Marylebone Cricket Club

Career statistics
Competition	First-class
Matches	1
Runs scored	45
Batting average	22.50
100s/50s	0/0
Top score	41
Balls bowled	54
Wickets	0
Bowling average	–
5 wickets in innings	0
10 wickets in match	0
Best bowling	–
Catches/stumpings	2/–
- Source: Cricinfo, 14 July 2019

Arthur Robertson Hoare (17 October 1871 – 18 March 1941) was an English first-class cricketer and clergyman.

== Life ==
The son of the Reverend Walter Marsham Hoare, he was born in October 1871 at Stibbard, Norfolk. He was educated at Eton College, before going up to Trinity College, Cambridge. While at Cambridge, he played football for Cambridge University A.F.C., gaining a football blue. After graduating from Cambridge, he became an Anglican clergyman. He was a curate at Kettering from 1894 to 1897. He went to South Africa in 1897, where he was a diocese chaplain at Cape Town until 1900. He served in the Second Boer War as a chaplain to the forces.

Hoare continued his role as chaplain to the forces until 1909, holding postings at the Royal Military Academy and at Colchester Garrison. He returned to service as a chaplain to the forces in World War I, during which he was mentioned in dispatches.

Following the war, he served as the rector of Colkirk until 1930, and the rector of Ashill from 1930 to 1941. He died at Ashill in March 1941.

== Cricketer ==
Hoare made his debut in minor counties cricket for Norfolk in 1895. Upon his return to England, he played a single first-class cricket match for the Marylebone Cricket Club (MCC) against Oxford University at Oxford in 1903. Batting twice in the match, he was dismissed for 4 runs in the MCC first-innings by William Evans, while in their second-innings he was dismissed for 41 runs by Robert Darling. He also bowled nine wicketless overs across the match. He resumed playing minor counties cricket for Norfolk until 1907, making a further seventeen appearances in the Minor Counties Championship.

== Family ==
Hoare was married twice, firstly to Mabel Pensie Marsham, daughter of John Marsham in August 1902, the couple having three children. He was widowed in 1928, later marrying his late wife's sister Evelyn Florence Marsham in October 1930.
