= William Emery (priest) =

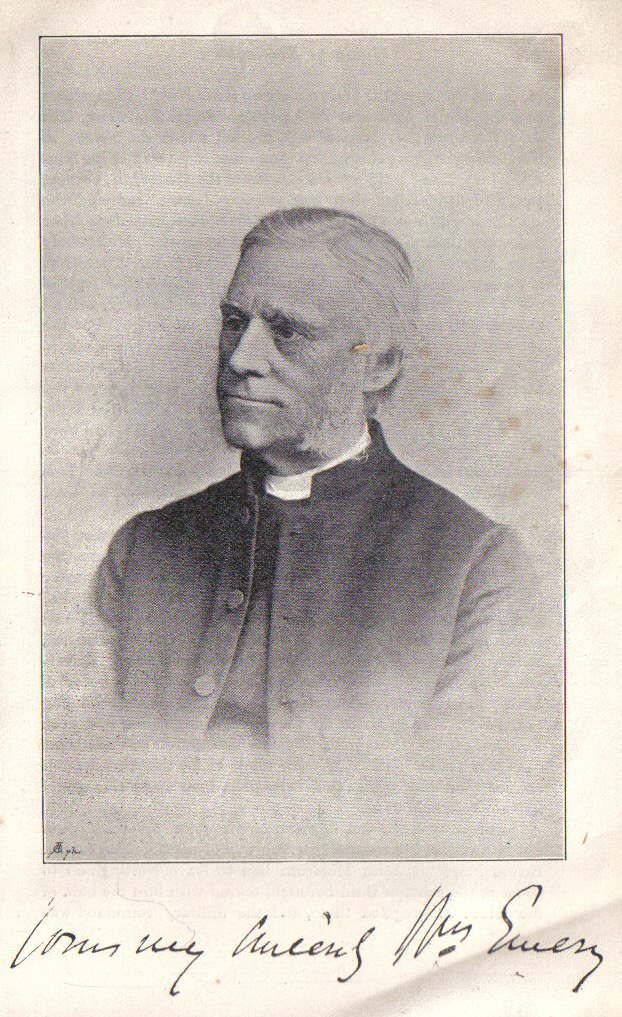
Emery in the Illustrated Guide to the Church Congress 1897

Rev. Canon William Emery (2 February 1825 – 14 December 1910) was an Anglican priest in the late 19th and early 20th centuries, who has been labelled the 'father' of Church Congress.

== Life ==
William Emery was born in London to William Emery of Hungerford Market, a feltmaker, and Mary Anne Thompson. He was educated at the City of London School, where he was the first boy to enter the new school in 1837 and became the first Times scholar at Cambridge. Admitted to Corpus Christi College, Cambridge in 1843, he graduated BA as 5th Wrangler in 1847. He was ordained in 1849 and was Fellow, Dean, Bursar and Tutor of his old college until 1865.

In his efforts of the 1850s to revive Convocation, Emery had an ally in the lay activist and banker Henry Hoare (1807–1866).

From 1864 until 1907 he was Archdeacon of Ely, marrying Fanny Maria, daughter of Sir Antonio Brady in 1865. Emery had been present at the first meeting of the Church Congress in 1861, where he spoke on free church seats, diocesan associations for increasing benefices for the endowment of poor benefices, and church rates. In 1869 he was appointed permanent Secretary of the Congress, and by 1907 had been present at every one of the first 47 Congresses.

He died in 1910, at Ely.

== Works ==
- Church organization and efficient ministry : the primary charge, 1866
- New burial act and church legislation : warnings and encouragements: a charge, 1880
- Free Education Act, 1891 : full text of the act, with a popular explanation of its bearings upon our voluntary schools, 1891
