= Henry Hoare (cricketer, born 1812) =

English cricketer and brewer

Personal information
- Full name: Henry James Hoare
- Born: 17 September 1812; Morden, Surrey, England
- Died: 16 February 1859 (aged 46); Torquay, Devon, England
- Batting: Unknown
- Relatives: Charles Hoare (son); Charles Hoare (brother)

Domestic team information
- Years: Team
- 1835–1838: Marylebone Cricket Club

Career statistics
Competition	First-class
Matches	6
Runs scored	98
Batting average	9.80
100s/50s	–/–
Top score	37*
Catches/stumpings	1/–
- Source: Cricinfo, 25 April 2021

Henry James Hoare (17 September 1812 – 16 February 1859) was an English first-class cricketer and brewer.

The son of the cricketer and brewer George Hoare, he was born at Morden in September 1812. He was educated at Harrow School, before going up to St John's College, Cambridge. After graduating from Cambridge, Hoare became a partner in the family brewing business. He later played first-class cricket for the Marylebone Cricket Club between 1835 and 1838, making six appearances. He scored 98 runs in these matches, with a highest score of 37 not out. He married Julia Seymour Traherne in 1849, having issue. Hoare died at Torquay in February 1859 and was buried at Morden. His son, Charles, was also a first-class cricketer, as was his brother Charles Hugh Hoare.
