= Charles Hoare (cricketer, born 1819) =

English cricketer

Charles Hugh Hoare (born 24 October 1819 at Mitcham, Surrey; died 4 April 1869 at Roke Abbey, Romsey, Hampshire) was an English brewer and cricketer.

== Life ==
He was the third son of George Matthew Hoare. He was educated at Rugby School, and matriculated at Exeter College, Oxford in 1837, graduating B.A. in 1841. He became manager of the Hoare & Co. brewery.

== Cricket ==
Hoare was the first captain of Surrey County Cricket Club following its formation in late 1845, leading them from 1846 until 1850. During his time as captain, Surrey played ten matches against other counties. Of these they won six, lost two, drew one and one match finished as a tie. In 1850, his last season as captain, they won all four of their inter-county matches. Surrey also played the All England Eleven that season, but Surrey had 14 players; the match was drawn.

He was a right-handed batsman of modest achievement. In 36 matches he scored only 507 runs at an average of 9.38. He managed to reach fifty twice, with a highest score of 58. His record considering only his matches for Surrey is substantially better: 17 matches, averaging 12.83. This was at a period when an average in the high teens was very good (for comparison, Fuller Pilch averaged 18.61 and George Parr averaged 20.20). As a bowler he is known to have taken two wickets, but the runs conceded are not recorded.

He made his debut in 1846 and played for the county until 1853. He played for Marylebone Cricket Club (MCC) from 1847 until 1854. After 1854 he played in only two more matches, both for the Gentlemen of the South in 1858.

He was also Surrey's first treasurer.

== Family ==
Hoare married in 1850 Isabella Elizabeth Twysden, daughter of the Rev. Thomas Twysden. After his death, she married again, in 1893 to Sir James Fergusson, 6th Baronet.

Their son Charles Twysden Hoare played; as did Charles Hugh's brother Henry James Hoare, and his father George Matthew Hoare.
