= Stibbard =

Village in Norfolk, England

Coordinates: 52.81°N 0.93°E

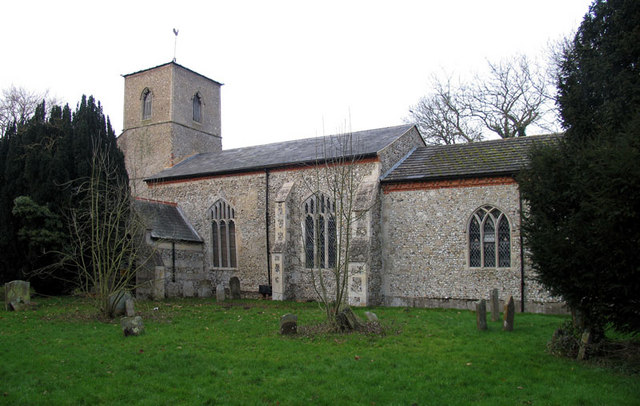
- All Saints' Parish Church, Stibbard

- Location within Norfolk
- Area: 7.30 km^{2} (2.82 sq mi)
- Population: 346 (parish, 2011 census)
  - Density: 47/km^{2} (120/sq mi)
- OS grid reference: TF981282
  - London: 120 miles (190 km)
- Civil parish: Stibbard
- District: North Norfolk
- Shire county: Norfolk
- Region: East
- Country: England
- Sovereign state: United Kingdom
- Post town: FAKENHAM
- Postcode district: NR21
- Dialling code: 01328
- Police: Norfolk
- Fire: Norfolk
- Ambulance: East of England
- UK Parliament: Broadland and Fakenham

Stibbard is a village and civil parish in the English county of Norfolk. The village is 19.3 miles (31.1 km) south-west of Cromer, 21.2 miles (34.1 km) north-west of Norwich and 120 mi (190 km) north-east of London. The village lies 4.9 miles (7.9 km) south-east of the nearby town of Fakenham. The nearest railway station is at Sheringham for the Bittern Line which runs between Sheringham, Cromer and Norwich. The nearest airport is Norwich International Airport.

The villages name origin is uncertain. The name exists in a variety of spellings suggesting 'border path', 'stone border' and 'stone bridge'.

It covers an area of 7.30 km^{2} (2.82 sq mi) and had a population of 365 in 149 households at the 2001 census, the population falling to 346 at the 2011 Census. For the purposes of local government, it falls within the district of North Norfolk.

== Notable people ==
- Arthur Hoare (1871–1941), cricketer and clergyman
