= Henry Hoare of Mitcham Grove =

English banker, (1750 – 1828)

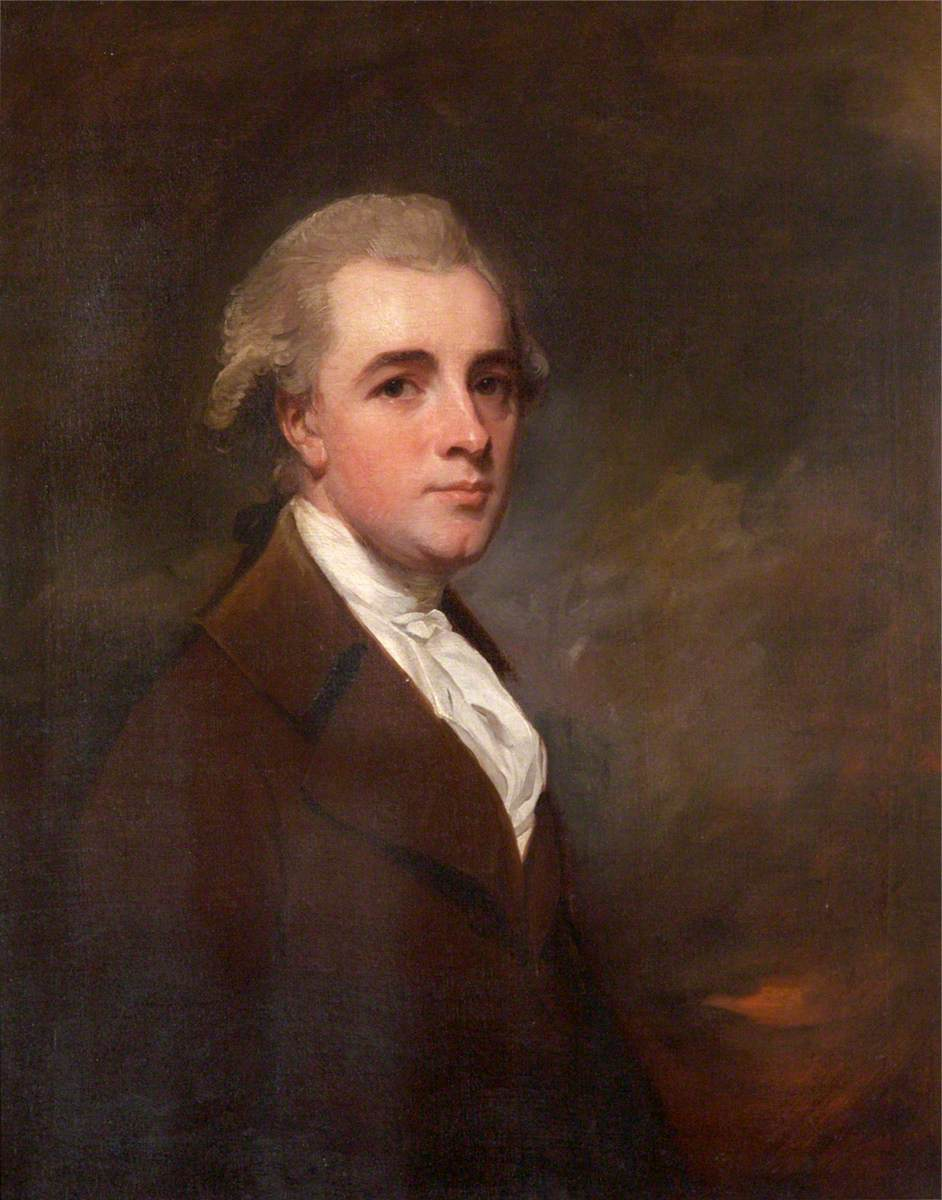
Henry Hoare of Mitcham Grove in his early thirties, portrait by George Romney

Henry Hoare of Mitcham Grove (1750–1828) was an English banker, senior partner of Hoare's Bank over four decades.

== Life ==
He was the son of William Hoare and his wife, Martha Cornelisen, daughter of Henry Cornelisen, and the grandson of Richard Hoare, eldest son of Sir Richard Hoare, founder of the bank; he was born in Bury St Edmunds.

Hoare became a junior partner in the family bank in 1774, when, according to Price the other partners were Henry Hoare II (died 1785), Sir Richard Hoare, 1st Baronet (died 1787), and Richard Hoare of Boreham House (died 1778). The baronet was replaced by his son (Henry) Hugh Hoare (1762–1841), around 1788; with Hoare becoming senior partner. He remained in the position to the end of his life in 1828, when Hugh Hoare replaced him.

Hoare owned mills on the River Wandle. He was also a shareholder in the Surrey Iron Railway.

== Mitcham Grove ==
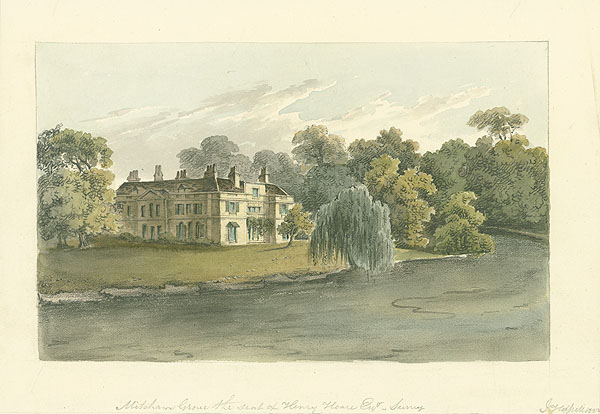
Mitcham Grove, 1822 watercolour

Hoare purchased Mitcham Grove, a country house near Mitcham, Surrey, from Alexander Wedderburn, 1st Earl of Rosslyn. The original house was Elizabethan. The grounds came to include the eastern part of what is now Ravensbury Park. Hoare bought it in 1784, and after his death it was sold to Sir John Lubbock, 2nd Baronet. At the time the area was industrial.

== Hoare & Co. brewery ==
Hoare bought in 1802 the Red Lion Brewery in East Smithfield, from 1802, and his third son George became a director. It later traded as Hoare and Co. The business was not a success, however, as he told his grandson and heir Henry Hoare of Staplehurst, shortly before he died: both Charles Hoare of the bank, and his son-in-law Acland, had put further capital into it.

The Hoare & Co. brewery existed until 1934, and for a number of generations was passed down in the Hoare family. Following a string of acquisitions after World War I, it was taken over by Charrington Brewery in 1933, and closed down the year after.

== Family ==
Hoare married in 1775 Lydia Henrietta Malortie, daughter of the Hanover merchant Isaac Malortie. Their children were:

1. William Henry Hoare (1776–1819), married 1807 Louisa Elizabeth Noel, daughter of Sir Gerard Noel, 2nd Baronet, father of Henry Hoare of Staplehurst (1807–1866).
2. Henry Vilars Hoare (1777–1822), unmarried.
3. George Matthew Hoare (1779–1852), married 1810 Angelina Frances Greene, daughter of James Greene of Lancashire.
4. Charles James Hoare (1781–1865), married 1811 Jane Isabella Holden, daughter of Richard Holden of Moorgate, Yorkshire.
5. Lydia Elizabeth Hoare (born 1786), married 1808 Sir Thomas Dyke Acland, 10th Baronet.
