= Hamilton Hoare =

English cricketer

Personal information
- Full name: Hamilton Noel Hoare
- Born: 20 February 1837; Pound Hill, Sussex, England
- Died: 1 July 1908 (aged 71); Chelsea, London, England
- Batting: Unknown
- Relatives: Henry Hoare (brother)

Domestic team information
- Years: Team
- 1853–1854: Sussex

Career statistics
Competition	First-class
Matches	2
Runs scored	8
Batting average	8.00
100s/50s	–/–
Top score	5*
Balls bowled	–
Wickets	–
Bowling average	–
5 wickets in innings	–
10 wickets in match	–
Best bowling	–
Catches/stumpings	1/–
- Source: Cricinfo, 21 June 2012

Hamilton Noel Hoare (20 February 1837 – 1 July 1908) was an English cricketer. He was born at Pound Hill, Sussex. He later changed his name to Hamilton Noel Hamilton-Hoare on the death of his maternal uncle, Sir John Hamilton, in 1882.

Hoare was the son of the cleric William Henry Hoare, of Oakfield, Crawley, Sussex, and his wife Araminta Anne Hamilton (died 1888), daughter of Sir John Hamilton, 1st Baronet, of Woodbrook. He was educated at Eton College, where he captained the college cricket team in 1853. He made two first-class appearances for Sussex, the first came against England at Lord's in 1853, while the second came against the Marylebone Cricket Club at E Tredcroft's Ground, Horsham. In his first match, England batted first and were dismissed for 128. In response, Sussex were dismissed for 80, with Hoare ending the innings not out on a single run. England then made 227 all out in their second-innings, leaving Sussex with a target of 276 for victory, however they were dismissed for just 78 in their second-innings, with Hoare being dismissed for 2 runs by William Hillyer. England won the match by 197 runs. In his second match, Sussex won the toss and elected to bat first, making 165 all out, with Hoare ending the innings not out on 5. The Marylebone Cricket Club were then dismissed for 129 in their first-innings, to which Sussex responded in their second-innings with just 64 all out, with Hoare ending the innings not out without scoring. Set 101 for victory, the Marylebone Cricket Club chased down their target to win by 6 wickets.

He was a director of Hoare's bank and after retiring he involved himself in charitable activities. He did not marry and died at Chelsea, London, on 1 July 1908. His brother, Henry, also played first-class cricket.
