= Luscombe Castle =

Grade I listed house in Teignbridge, UK

Coordinates: 50.5815°N 3.4945°W

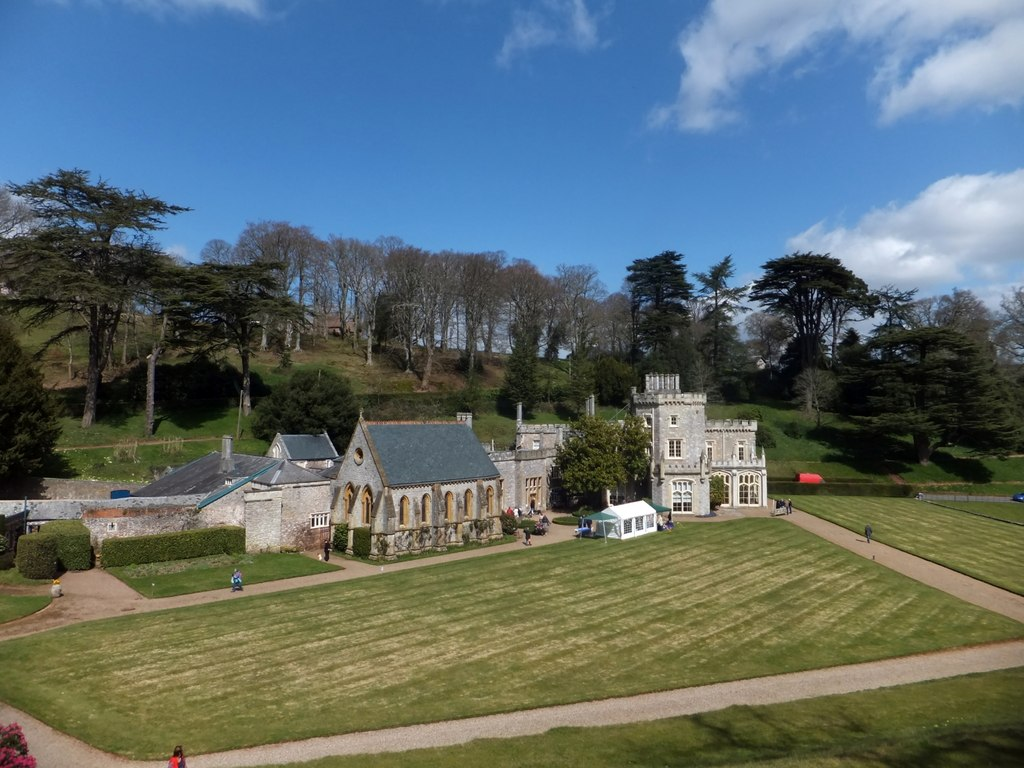
- Luscombe Castle
- Interactive map of the Luscombe Castle area

General information
- Type: Stately home
- Architectural style: Gothic Revival
- Classification: Grade I listed
- Location: Dawlish
- Construction started: 1800
- Completed: 1804

Technical details
- Material: Stone

Design and construction
- Architect: John Nash
- Other designers: Humphry Repton (gardens)
- Main contractor: John Veitch (gardens)

Luscombe Castle is a country house situated near the resort town of Dawlish, in the county of Devon in England. Upon purchasing the land at Luscombe in 1797, Charles Hoare demolished the existing house and commissioned architects John Nash and Humphrey Repton to design a new house and gardens at the site. Nash and Repton came up with an asymmetrical designed building made from Portland stone, with castellated parapets, turrets and pinnacles to create the feel of a picturesque castle.

Nash's designs for the house included a three-storey octagonal tower, with two wings coming off it and a second square tower above a porte-cochère. Inside the drawing room occupied the ground floor of the tower, with a sitting room above. The dining room was designed to hold views across the valley, and the asymmetric rooms allowed for a panorama of views. To allow easy access to the gardens, the servant's quarters were moved to a separate wing, but made to be less prominent. A chapel was added in approximately 1862, and the house's loggia was converted into a conservatory.

The grounds were designed by Repton, and laid out by John Veitch. They extend to 140 hectares (350 acres), with 10 hectares (25 acres) of gardens, both formal and informal, and other pleasure grounds, while the remainder covers parks and woodlands. The main garden, known as the American Garden, includes ponds and ornamental shrubs. The house was designated a Grade I listed building and its gardens are also Grade I listed in the National Register of Historic Parks and Gardens.

The site should be distinguished from Luscombe in the parish of Rattery in Devon, about 16 miles to the south-west, the seat of the Luscombe family from before the 16th century to shortly before 1810.

== History ==
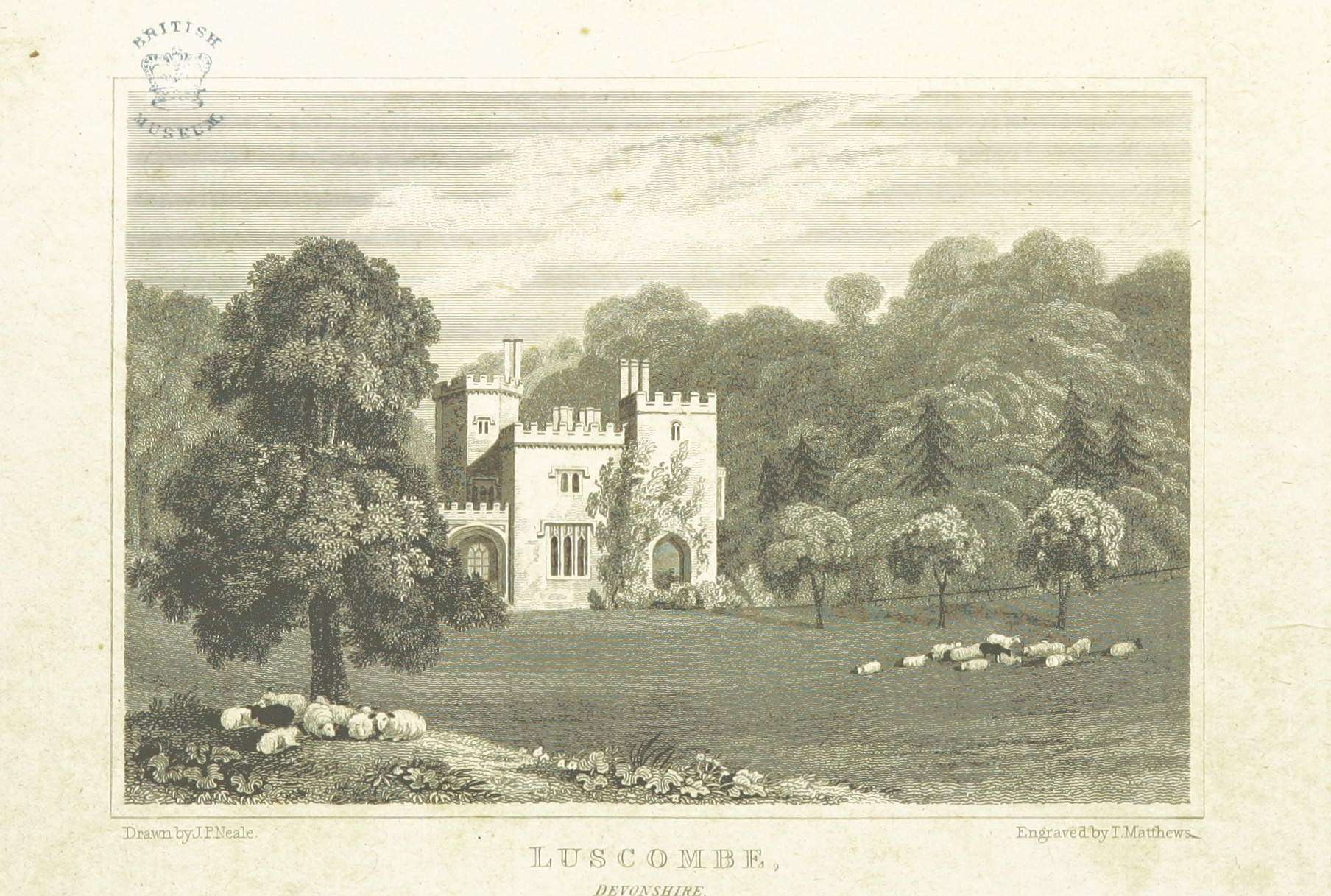
1818 etching of the castle

The process of purchasing Luscombe estate was started in 1788 by Charles Hoare, a prominent banker whose sister, Henrietta, was the widow of Sir Thomas Dyke Acland, 9th Baronet (1752–1794) of Killerton, near Exeter. Hoare rented a house in Dawlish during the 1790s, while the purchase was progressing, being finalised in 1797. The original property included a large house with outbuildings, as well as part of the nearby farm.

The nearby 19th century house, Stonelands also formed part of the estate, so Repton ensured that it would be visible from the parkland. Stonelands no longer forms part of the estate, but is still visible from the park and wood. Towards the end of the 19th century, the house's park land was open to the public on certain days of the week by Peter Arthur Marsham Hoare, however this practice had ended by 1902. The grounds were still regularly opened for events such as fetes, the Dawlish flower show, as well as opening the gardens to the public.

During World War II, Luscombe Castle was used as an evacuation point. The evacuees included a boys' preparatory school, whose pupils included the young William Franklyn, and girls in the care of the Barnardo's charity. After the war, the house continued to provide accommodation for girls as a children's home until the house was returned to the Hoare family in July 1948.

The Castle and grounds were designated Grade I listed status on 12 August 1987. Luscombe suffered storm damage in the Burns' Day storm in 1990, leading to a management plan and historical survey.

== Location ==
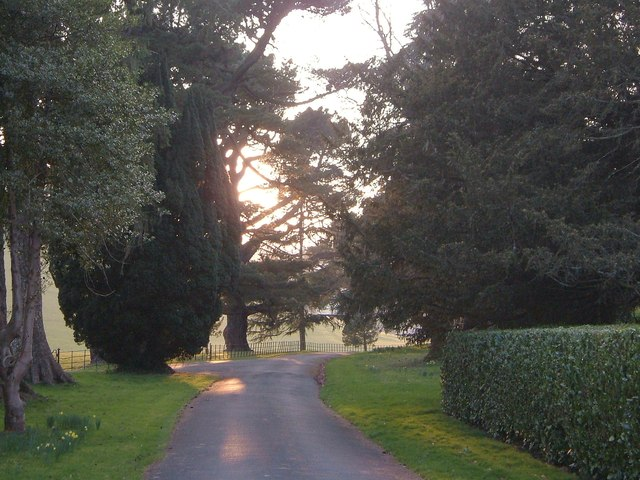
Entrance drive to Luscombe

Luscombe Castle is set close to the town of Dawlish in Devon. The castle's grounds total 140 hectares (350 acres), of which 10 hectares (25 acres) are formal gardens and pleasure grounds, while the remaining 130 hectares (320 acres) are parkland and ornamental woodland. Situated in the Luscombe and Summercombe valleys, its boundaries are formed by a ridge of high ground at Little Haldon, and by Luscombe Hill. The majority of boundaries are formed by hedging and banks. The boundaries of the estate cover approximately 7 miles (11 km). The house's chosen location meant that the building was not as large as it might have been, had it been moved a short distance and built on terraces.

The building is approached from a point on Luscombe Hill, through a gate bordered by rubble-stone walls. There is a 19th-century single story lodge at the entrance, built in gothic carved stone. From there, a 400 m (1,300 ft) drive leads to the north side of the Luscome Castle, where there is a carriage court bordered by yew hedges. Further along the nearby service road is a second 19th century gothic stone lodge. The park can be approached from the south-east, passing two further 19th century lodges on the grounds.

== House ==
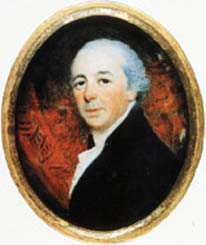
Portrait of John Nash, who designed the house

By 1799, the original house at Luscombe had been demolished, and work began on a new house for Hoare in 1800. The house was designed by John Nash, who was a pioneer for the Gothic Revival style. In his early drawings for the house, Repton suggested two sketches to Hoare; one of a more standard house, and the other with the more natural design which would settle into the landscape. The latter was chosen and the final design of the house was based upon Downton Castle, but with an asymmetrical plan to experience the panoramic views around the house. It was Nash's first attempt at a Gothic castle design and he would subsequently create several further houses in the same style.

The building was constructed of Portland stone, largely over two storeys but with a three-story octagonal tower between the two wings, as well as a square tower to the north above the porte-cochère. The walls feature castellated parapets, turrets and pinnacles, giving the building the feel of a castle in the gothic style. The building has an asymmetric feel, in a picturesque style, with varying shapes and elevations to different sections. The intent was to give a castle style to the building, reminiscent of historical fortresses, but with the comfortable interior of a house.

On entrance through the porte-cochère, there is a circular hall with staircase hall to the right. To the left of the hall is the dining room, with windows at the end which give views over the park. Straight ahead from the hall is the drawing room, an octagonal room with book cases on four sides and with a white marble chimneypiece designed by John Flaxman, the only surviving chimneypiece by the sculptor. The windows of the drawing room provide a view towards the sea, with the upper sections of the windows containing stained glass. Prior to the addition of the chapel, the staircase hall contained an organ and stained glass window to give a similar feel. Throughout the ground floor there are painting by artists such as Loutherbourg, Thomas Lawrence, Alessandro Allori and Henry Thomson. When the house was completed in 1803, Charles Hoare spent £900 (equivalent to £79,992 in 2025) on furnishing the building including pieces by Chippendale.

In addition there were servants quarters and spaces on the ground floor, and a library in the north room on the second floor, as well as a sitting room over the octagonal drawing room. According to Repton, the design should allow ground floor rooms where the garden is visible and directly accessible, meaning that servants quarters needed to be placed in their own wing, but without prominence so as to maintain the hierarchy. In the south-east corner of the building there was a gothic loggia which was glazed in the 19th century to create a conservatory, some time after the conservatory in the American Garden was removed.

=== Chapel ===
When the house was first built, Repton added shrubberies to the south-west corner, to hide the stables to the west of the house. These were replaced by the Chapel of St Alban in 1862, designed by George Gilbert Scott at the cost approximately £5,000 (equivalent to £525,636 in 2025) despite being too small to hold more than 100 people. The chapel is a single story addition, built of carved sandstone with a slate roof. Its north-east face resembles an apse, while its walls are buttressed. The windows are stained glass, and the seats are carved out of cedar from the estate.

== Gardens ==
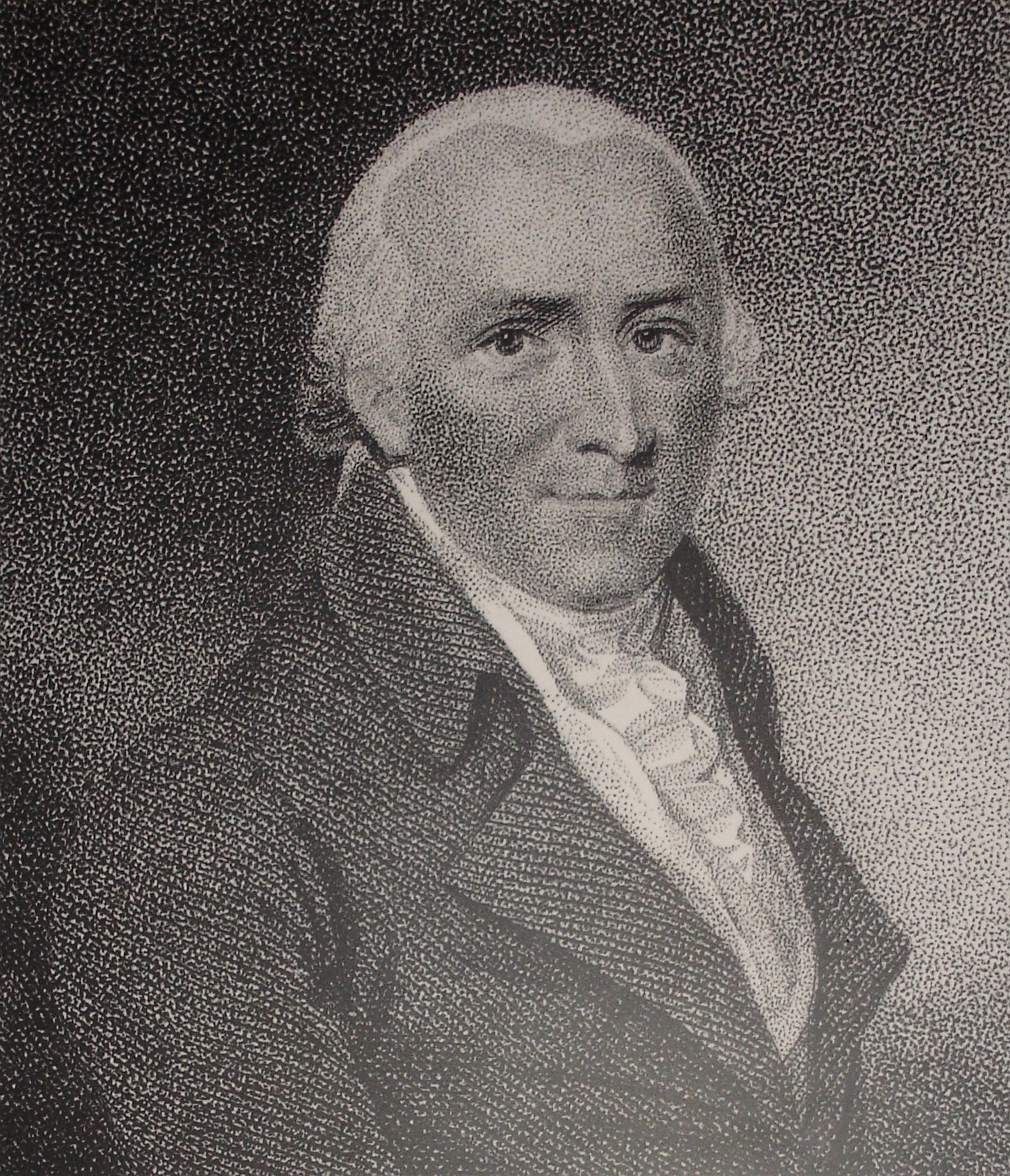
Humphry Repton

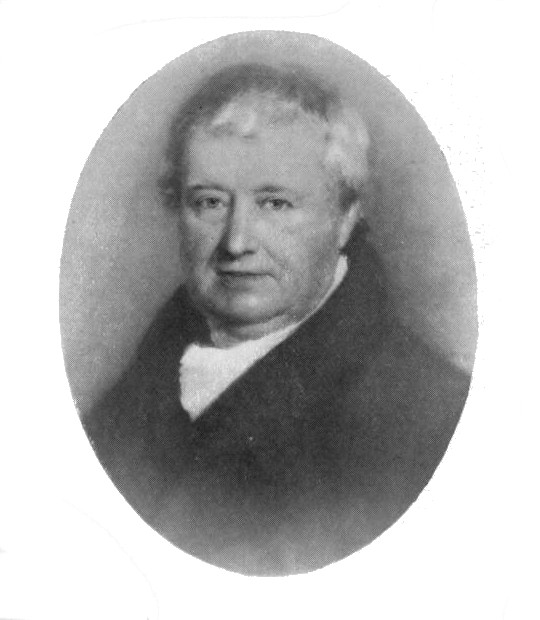
John Veitch

Veitch laid out the gardens to Repton's designs

The garden was laid out by John Veitch to the designs of Humphry Repton, who shared a partnership with Nash over a period of years. While Nash focused on the building of Gothic houses, Repton would place them in landscapes designed for the Picturesque movement. The gardens surround the house on the north-east, east and south sides, and include both formal and informal gardens as well as pleasure grounds.

The garden and park extend to about 140 hectares. Planting in the park continued until about 1805 but it was Peter A.M. Hoare in around 1900 who laid out the formal pleasure gardens which extend to about 10 hectares. These lie to the west of the house, while the more picturesque open lawns lie to the east. There is a kitchen garden at the nearby Home Farm, though it had fallen into disuse by 1998. The trees provided by Veitch cost a total of £1,212 (equivalent to £87,774 in 2025) and included fuchsias, myrtles, camellias as well as Greek firs which became, at 12 feet (3.7 m) in 1847, the largest in England.

=== American Garden ===
The American Garden was developed between 1812 and 1814, while the other gardens were created over the following century, and was designed to be the main pleasure ground for the house. It is surrounded on two sides by a wall to the north and a ha-ha to the south. The American Garden includes oaks which pre-date the house, as well as ornamental shrubs and rhododendrons from 1890. There is a pond north-east of the house which dates to approximately 1900. At the west end of the American Garden there is a round stone summerhouse with a thatched roof, built originally near the park in 1799, but moved in 1830. The original designs included a conservatory along the north-east wall, but this was removed in the mid 1800s. In 1998, the American Garden included a network of gravelled walks, 19th century shrubberies and older trees.

=== Other formal gardens ===
To the east, south and west of the house, there are formal gardens, formed during the late 19th century and replacing the original pleasure grounds. There is a 50 metres (160 ft) wide lawn to the east of the building, allowing views towards the sea, with a stone ha-ha at the end. Along the east side of the building, there is also a gravel walkway which leads to some grass terraces on the north-facing slope near the house. From the walkway, there is an offshoot which leads past the house's conservatory to an ornamented gravel area near the chapel. Past the gravel area there is a walk through the west formal gardens, including rhododendrons and series of three round gravel areas. The central gravel area includes a pond with stone edging.

Nearby the central gravel area is a flight of steps to the historical rose garden, now planted with herbaceous plants. North of the formal garden, there is a rock and water garden, built in the 20th century, with a seating grotto in the north-west corner. There is a gravel path from the water garden which returns to the house, originally with a pergola, now gone.

=== Park and woods ===
East of the house there is parkland known as The Park, whilst to the west there is an area known as 'Back Lawn'. To the south-west, near the Home Farm, there is a meadow and to the south-east there is parkland known as Church Park. The Park is enclosed by woodland, sloped along the valley towards Dawlish, and is used for grazing. Church Park includes exotic trees from the 19th century, as well as an ornamental pond and waterfall from the same period. In the 20th century, some of the nearby woodland was felled to make glades.

There are two ornamental woods within the grounds, Summercombe Wood and Luscombe Wood. Luscombe Wood covers an area south of the house, through the centre of which runs a private road known as The Terrace. The wood is made up primarily of deciduous trees, interspaced with laurels. It also includes an 18th-century pine plantation to the east of the woods. The north-west boundary of the woods is Haldon Lane and the other side of the road is Summercombe Wood. Summercombe has largely been replanted in the latter half of the 20th century, but the original 19th century drive follows a stream through the valley past a pond to a stone bridge to two further areas of nearby woodland. At the west side of Summercombe Wood, there is a 19th-century lodge, Haldon Lodge.

== Gallery ==
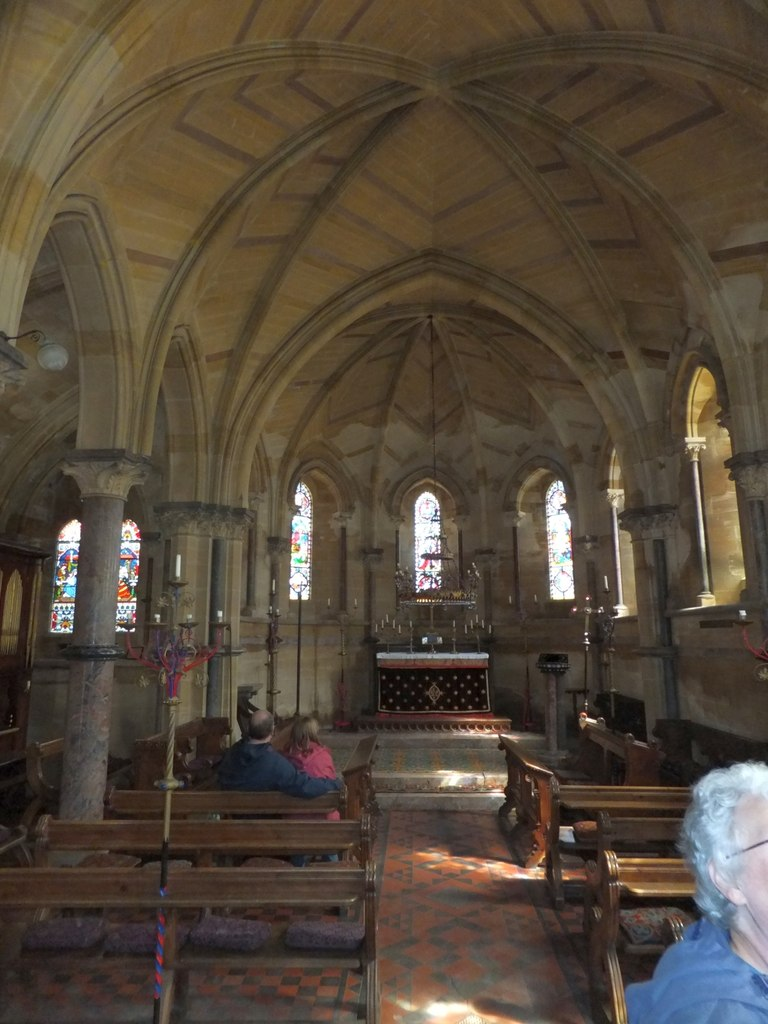
Chapel

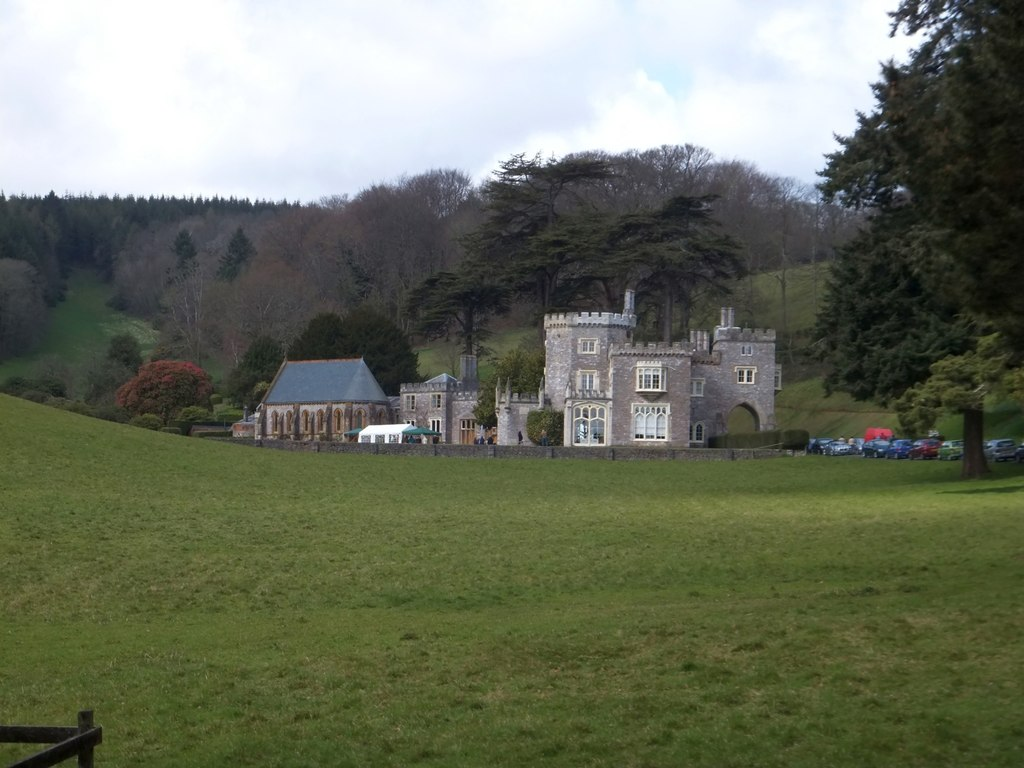
Castle view
