= Church Congress =

Annual meeting of members of the Church of England

Church Congress is an annual meeting of members of the Church of England, lay and clerical, to discuss matters religious, moral or social, in which the church is interested. It has no legislative authority, and there is no voting on the questions discussed.

== History ==
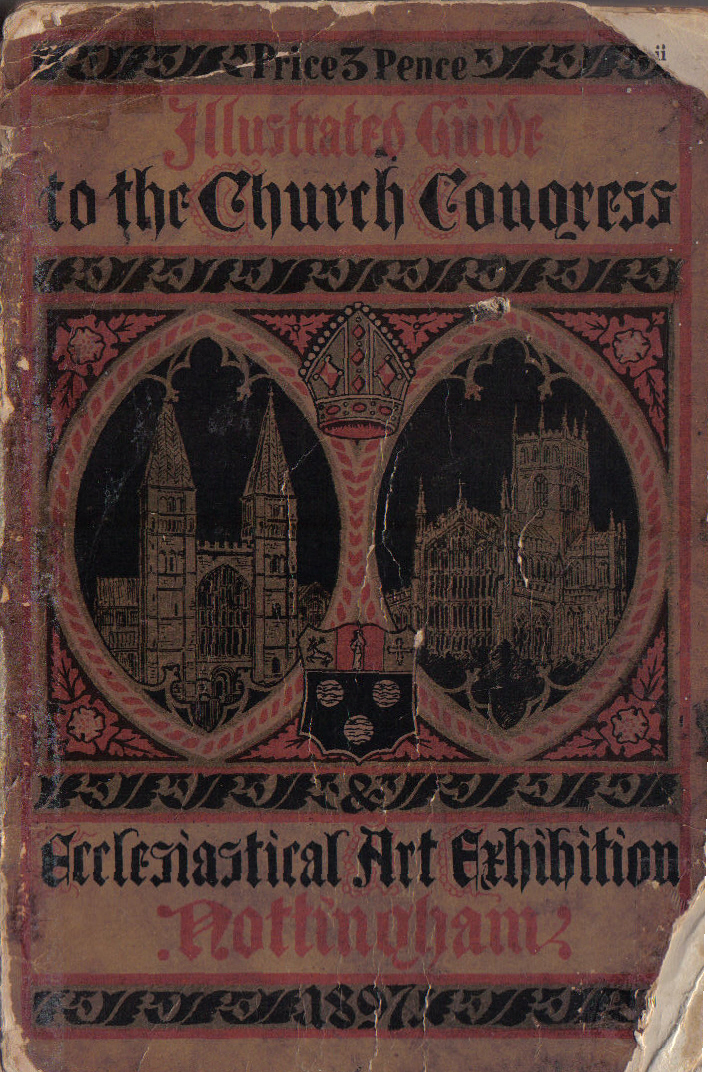
Front cover of the Illustrated Guide to the Church Congress and Ecclesiastical Art Exhibition held in Nottingham in 1897

The first congress was held in 1861 in the hall of King's College, Cambridge, and was the outcome of the revival of convocation in 1852. From 1879 the congress included an Ecclesiastical and Educational Art Exhibition.

The congress is under the presidency of the bishop in whose diocese it happens to be held. The meetings of the congress have been mainly remarkable as illustrating the wide divergences of opinion and practice in the Church of England, no less than the broad spirit of tolerance which has made this possible and honorably differentiates these meetings from so many ecclesiastical assemblies of the past. The congress of 1908 was especially distinguished, not only for the expression of diametrically opposed views on such questions as the sacrifice of the mass or the higher criticism, but for the very large proportion of time given to the discussion of the attitude of the Church towards socialism and kindred subjects.

== Meetings ==
Historical places of meeting are:

- King's College, Cambridge 1861
- Oxford 1862
- Manchester 1863
- Bristol 1864
- Norwich 1865
- York 1866
- Wolverhampton 1867
- Dublin 1868
- Liverpool 1869
- Southampton 1870
- Nottingham 1871
- Leeds 1872
- Bath 1873
- Brighton 1874
- Stoke on Trent 1875
- Plymouth 1876
- Croydon 1877
- Sheffield 1878
- Swansea 1879
- Leicester 1880
- Newcastle 1881
- Derby 1882
- Reading 1883
- Carlisle 1884
- Portsmouth 1885
- Wakefield 1886
- Wolverhampton 1887
- Manchester 1888
- Cardiff 1889
- Kingston upon Hull 1890
- Rhyl 1891
- Folkestone 1892
- Birmingham 1893
- Exeter 1894
- Norwich 1895
- Shrewsbury 1896
- Nottingham 1897
- Bradford 1898
- London 1899
- Newcastle 1900
- Brighton 1901
- Northampton 1902
- Bristol 1903
- Liverpool 1904
- Weymouth 1905
- Barrow-in-Furness 1906
- Great Yarmouth 1907
- Manchester 1908
- Swansea 1909
- Cambridge 1910
- Stoke on Trent 1911
- Middlesbrough 1912
- Southampton 1913
- suspended 1914–1918
- Leicester 1919
- Southend-on-Sea 1920
- Birmingham 1921
- Sheffield 1922
- Plymouth 1923
- Oxford 1924
- Eastbourne 1925
- Southport 1926
- Ipswich 1927
- Cheltenham 1928
- Newport 1930
