= C. D. B. Marsham =

English cricketer (1835–1915)

Personal information
- Full name: Cloudesley Dewar Bullock Marsham
- Born: 30 January 1835; Oxford, Oxfordshire, England
- Died: 23 March 1915 (aged 80); Harrietsham, Kent, England
- Batting: Right-handed
- Bowling: Right-arm roundarm medium-fast
- Relatives: C. H. B. Marsham (son); Francis Marsham (son); Charles Marsham (brother); Robert Marsham (brother); Algernon Marsham (grandson)

Domestic team information
- Years: Team
- 1854–1858: Oxford University
- 1857–1859: Marylebone Cricket Club

Career statistics
Competition	First-class
Matches	34
Runs scored	602
Batting average	11.57
100s/50s	–/–
Top score	39*
Balls bowled	6,440
Wickets	180
Bowling average	12.25
5 wickets in innings	14
10 wickets in match	4
Best bowling	9/64
Catches/stumpings	26/–
- Source: Cricinfo, 18 June 2022

The Rev. Cloudesley Dewar Bullock Marsham (30 January 1835 – 23 March 1915) was an English amateur cricketer who played mainly for Oxford University Cricket Club, The Gentlemen and England in the period between 1854 and 1866.

== Family ==
Marsham was born at Merton College, Oxford in 1835, the son of Robert Bullock Marsham, the Warden of Merton, and a member of the extended family of the Earl of Romney. He was a student at Merton College and later became the rector of Harrietsham near Maidstone in Kent in 1888. His brothers, Charles and Robert both played first-class cricket for Oxford and MCC whilst his brother-in-law George Marsham made three first-class appearances for Kent County Cricket Club. His sons, Cloudesley Henry Bullock Marsham and Francis Marsham both played for Kent, the former captaining the county to their first County Championship in 1906, as did his grandson Algernon.

== Cricketing career ==
In 34 first-class matches, Marsham scored 602 runs at an average of 11.57, and took 180 wickets with his medium-fast roundarm deliveries between 1854 and 1866. He was considered an excellent bowler for time, using his height effectively and bowling "very straight". In his obituary, Wisden described him as "in his day, the best amateur bowler in England". He played 11 times for Oxford University, ten times for The Gentlemen and four times for England as well as appearing in matches of teams such as MCC and others. He made a number of non-first-class appearances for teams such as Harlequins, Free Foresters and I Zingari and played for Buckinghamshire County Cricket Club after his first-class career was over.
