= Walter Marsham =

English cricketer

Personal information
- Born: 24 October 1869; Barton Seagrave, Northamptonshire, England
- Died: 8 March 1945 (aged 75); Winchester, Hampshire, England
- Relatives: John Marsham (father); Arthur Hoare (brother-in-law)

Domestic team information
- Years: Team
- 1897: Northamptonshire

Career statistics
Competition	First-class
Matches	1
Runs scored	75
Batting average	37.50
100s/50s	0/1
Top score	68
Catches/stumpings	0/–
- Source: Cricinfo, 12 October 2013

Walter John Marsham (24 October 1869 – 8 March 1945) was an English cricketer. Marsham's batting style is unknown.

The son of Kent cricketer Rev. Hon. John Marsham and Penelope Jane Hume and grandson of Charles Marsham, 3rd Earl of Romney, Marsham was born at Barton Seagrave Rectory in Northamptonshire where his father was rector.

Marsham appeared once for Northamptonshire in the 1897 Minor Counties Championship against Worcestershire at the County Ground, Northampton. While in the British Raj, Marsham made a single first-class cricket appearance for the Gentlemen of India against Oxford University Authentics in January 1903 at the Polo Ground, Delhi. Marsham married Frances Leonora Monckton, daughter of Edward Philip Monckton MP, of Fineshade Abbey and Laundimer House, Oundle, in 1908. He died at Winchester, Hampshire, on 8 March 1945 aged 75. He had two children, John Edward born 1910 and Violet Leonora born 1913. His brother-in-law Arthur Hoare was also a first-class cricketer.
