= Algernon Marsham =

English cricketer (1919–2004)

Algernon James Bullock Marsham (14 August 1919 – 11 February 2004) was an English cricketer.

Marsham played in 17 first-class cricket matches between 1939 and 1947 as a left-handed batsman and a right arm leg break bowler. He was the last member of the Marsham family, which included his father C. H. B. Marsham and grandfather C. D. B. Marsham, to play cricket for Kent.

Marsham was educated at Eton and Christ Church, Oxford. During World War II he was commissioned in the King's Royal Rifle Corps and was for some time a prisoner of war in Germany.
