= Robert Bullock Marsham =

English academic (1786–1880)

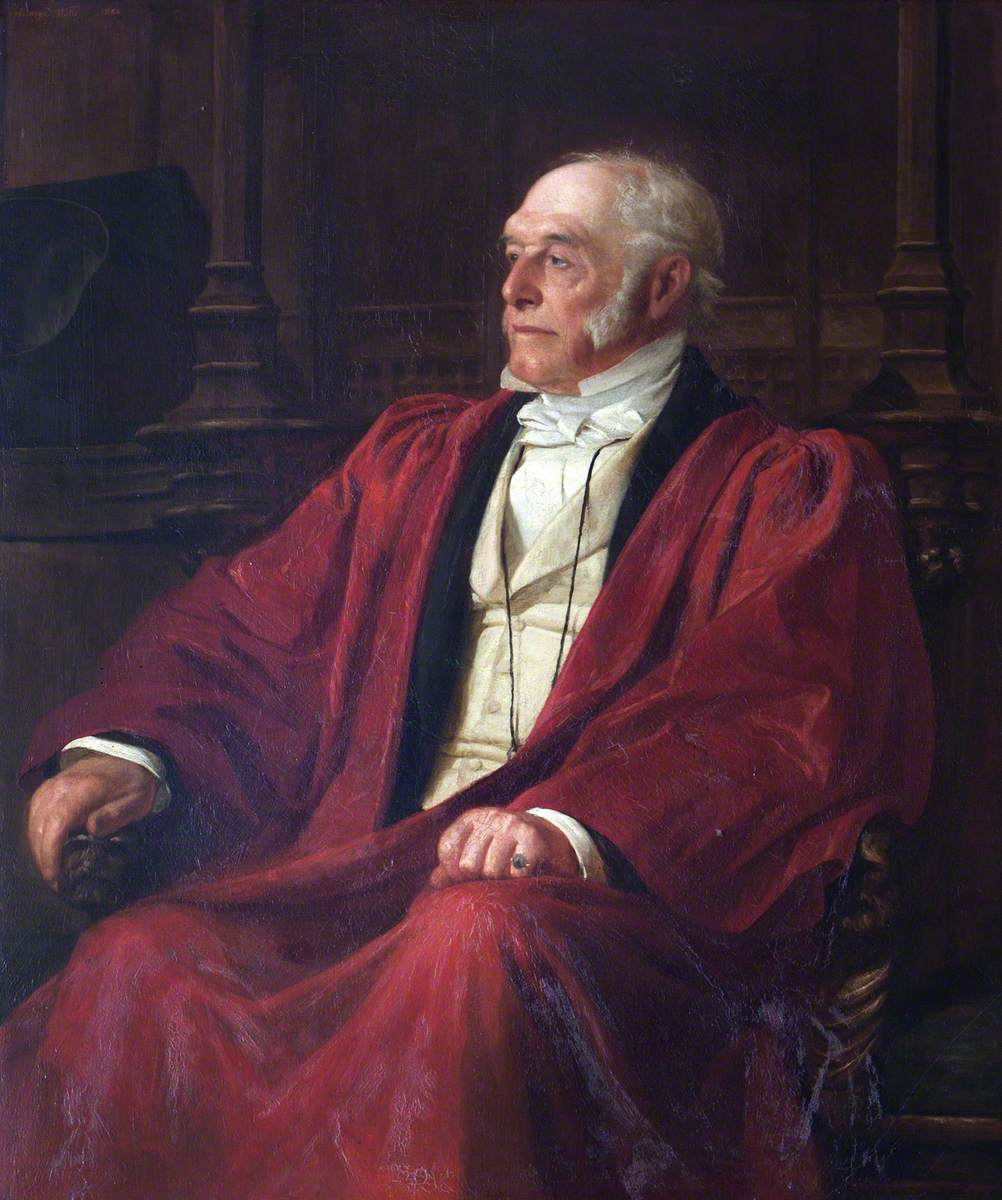
Robert Bullock Marsham, portrait by Henry Tanworth Wells

Robert Bullock Marsham (17 June 1786 – 27 December 1880) was an English academic, Warden of Merton College, Oxford for 54 years.

Marsham was the son of Jacob Marsham, Canon of Windsor (son of Robert Marsham, 2nd Baron Romney) and his wife Amelia Frances Bullock (daughter of Joseph Bullock MP).

He was educated at Eton College, and entered Christ Church, Oxford in 1803, graduating B.A. 1807, M.A. 1814, D.C.L. 1826. He was a Fellow of Merton College, Oxford 1812–1826, and was called to the bar at Lincoln's Inn in 1813. He became Dean of Merton College in 1824, and was Warden of Merton College from 1826 until his death on 27 December 1880, aged 94.

== Politics ==
At the 1830 general election, Marsham stood against James Balfour at Anstruther Burghs in Scotland. Marsham's wife's late first husband Sir John Carmichael-Anstruther had previously represented Anstruther Burghs, as had many members of the Anstruther family, which was locally influential. Marsham had appealed to Home Secretary Robert Peel for backing from the Tory government: Peel refused, as Balfour was also a Tory supporter of the government. Balfour retained the seat, with Marsham winning only one vote from the seat's four voting constituent burghs. (Kilrenny, the seat's fifth burgh, had been disenfranchised as a result of legal problems.)

In the controversy over the Corn Laws, Marsham was a protectionist. In the winter of 1842–43, he remarked that although workers could not buy bread, they "rejoiced in potatoes". He was ridiculed by opponents of the Corn Laws, earning the nickname Potato Dick.

== Family ==
On 27 March 1828, Marsham married Janet ("Jessie"), Lady Carmichael-Anstruther (1793–1881), daughter of Major-General David Dewar and widow of Sir John Carmichael-Anstruther Bt MP. They had two daughters and three sons:

- Charles Jacob Bullock Marsham (1829–1901), cricketer
- Mary Amelia Frances Bullock Marsham (1830–1861)
- Jessie Elizabeth Bullock Marsham (1832–1922), married Charles Montague Style
- Robert Henry Bullock Marsham (1833–1913), cricketer, barrister and magistrate
- Cloudesley Dewar Bullock Marsham (1835–1915), cricketer and clergyman

Lady Carmichael-Anstruther also had a son John, born posthumously after her first husband's death in 1818, killed in a shooting accident at Eton in 1831, aged 13.
