= Robert Darling (cricketer) =

Scottish cricketer

Personal information
- Full name: Robert Stormonth Darling
- Born: 6 June 1880; Kelso, Roxburghshire, Scotland
- Died: 20 May 1956 (aged 75); Kelso, Roxburghshire, Scotland
- Batting: Right-handed
- Bowling: Right-arm medium
- Relatives: Derrick Bailey (son-in-law)

Domestic team information
- Years: Team
- 1902–1903: Oxford University

Career statistics
| Competition | First-class |
|---|---|
| Matches | 10 |
| Runs scored | 188 |
| Batting average | 11.75 |
| 100s/50s | –/1 |
| Top score | 54 |
| Balls bowled | 114 |
| Wickets | 3 |
| Bowling average | 28.00 |
| 5 wickets in innings | – |
| 10 wickets in match | – |
| Best bowling | 2/35 |
| Catches/stumpings | 3/– |
- Source: Cricinfo, 31 May 2020

Robert Stormonth Darling (6 June 1880 – 20 May 1956) was a Scottish first-class cricketer.

The son of Patrick Stormonth Darling, he was born at Kelso in June 1880. He was educated at Winchester College, before going up to Oriel College, Oxford. While studying at Oxford, he played first-class cricket for Oxford University, making his debut against H. D. G. Leveson-Gower XI at Oxford in 1902. He played first-class cricket for Oxford until 1903, making ten appearances. In these ten matches, Darling scored 188 runs at an average of 11.75 and a high score of 54. With the ball, he took 3 wickets.

Darling served in the First World War with the Lothians and Border Horse, holding the temporary rank major in August 1916. He was later employed as the joint manager of the Kelso branch of the Bank of Scotland. He died suddenly at Kelso in May 1956. His son-in-law, Derrick Bailey, also played first-class cricket.
