= Robert Marsham =

British naturalist (1708–1797)

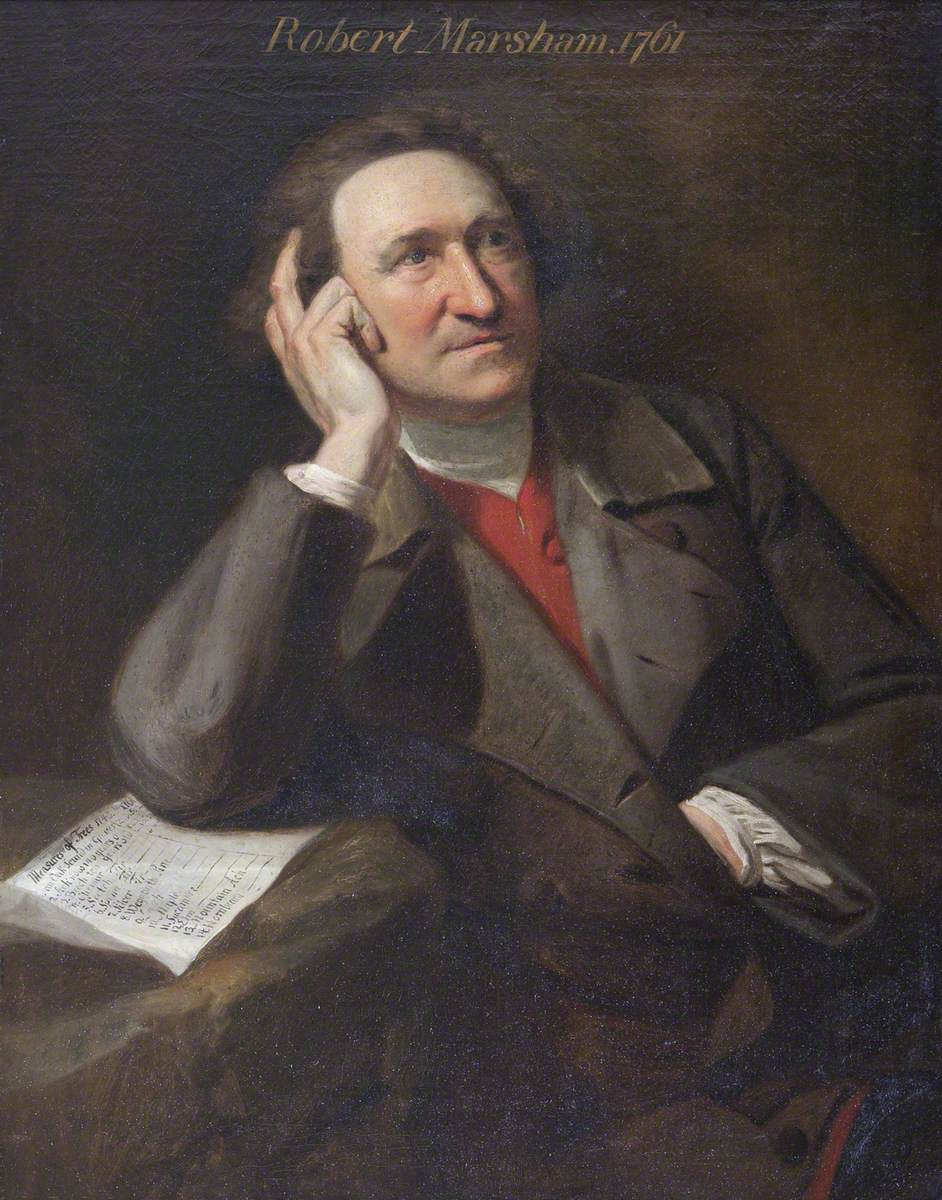
Copy of the 1761 Johann Zoffany portrait of Marsham; the original is at Hardingham Hall

Robert Marsham (27 January 1708–4 September 1797) was an English naturalist considered to be the founding father of phenology, the study of the effects of the seasons on plants and animals.

== Life ==
He was admitted to Clare College, Cambridge in 1728. From a very early age he had shown a passion for the natural world. In later life, he owned a modest-sized country estate in Stratton Strawless, Norfolk and became friendly with the naturalist Gilbert White, with whom he carried on a lengthy correspondence and who described him as a "painful and accurate naturalist" (by 'painful' he would have meant painstaking).

He is best known for his Indications of Spring, the phenology notes in which he recorded 27 signs of spring, starting in 1736 and continuing for over 60 years. Successive generations of his family added to his work until well into the 20th century and this information now provides data to the UK phenology database, giving us a wealth of knowledge about how spring is influenced by prevailing weather conditions, which is of interest in the study of climate change. Marsham was the first to record the effects of nature and seasonal change.

Marsham provided insight into the winter of 1739/40, the coldest year on record, when the contents of his chamber pot frequently froze overnight and the turnip crop was completely destroyed. Turnips, being a Norfolk speciality, feature elsewhere: he regularly recorded turnip flowering dates (needed when turnips were to produce seed). He was amazed at the size a turnip achieved.

My farm produced me a Turnip that weighed 19lbs&2oz, & was 39&half round

— Robert Marsham

Marsham is still the only person in Norfolk to have recorded the wallcreeper bird.

His interest in trees resulted in his being elected a Fellow of the Royal Society in 1780. His Indications of Spring were published in 'Philosophical Transactions' by the Royal Society in 1789.

He married twice. His first wife was Mary Browne of Yaxham, who died in 1752, with whom he had one son, Robert. From his second marriage to Elizabeth Newby of Stratton, he had another son, Thomas who died at the age of 14.

== The Great Cedar ==
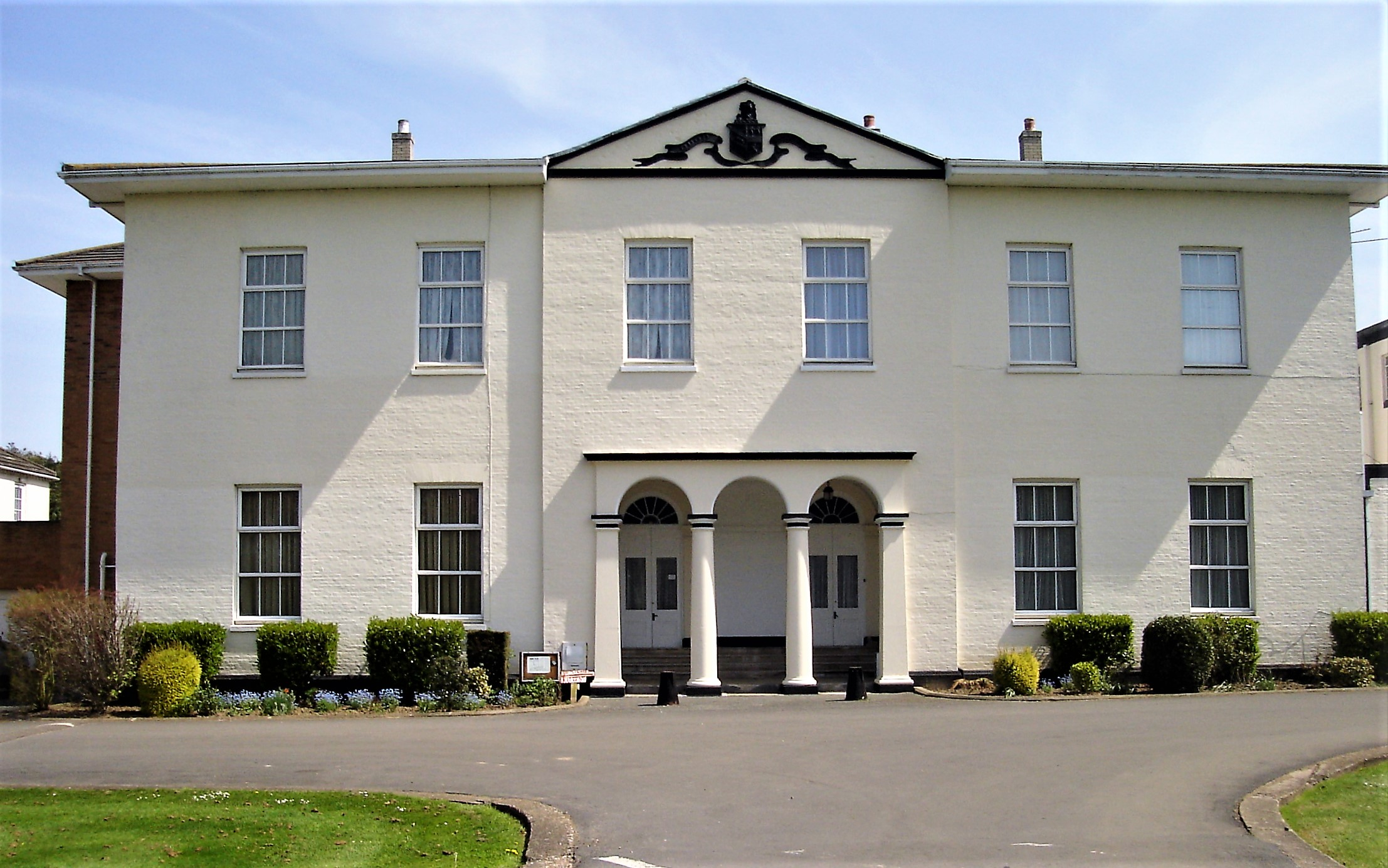
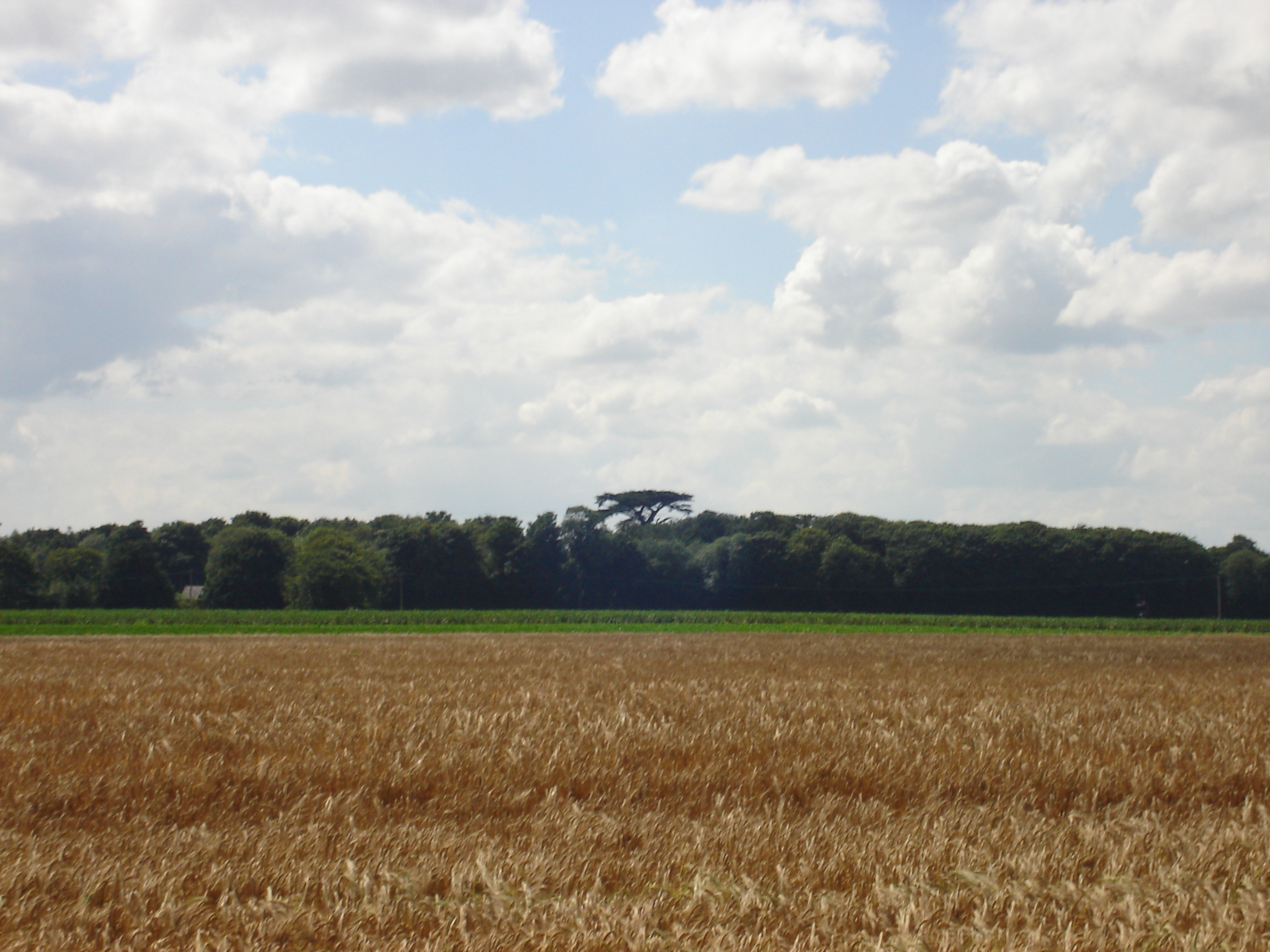
(left) Stratton Strawless hall. home of the Marsham family; (right) the Great Cedar standing above the surrounding woodland

In 1747 Marsham planted an example of a Cedrus atlantica, now known as the 'Great Cedar'. The tree, which is in Reed-house grove to the east of Stratton Strawless Hall, was measured in 2000, at which time it had attained a height of 31 metres (102 ft) and a circumference of 7 metres (23 ft).
