= Francis Bullock-Marsham =

British Army officer and cricketer (1883–1971)

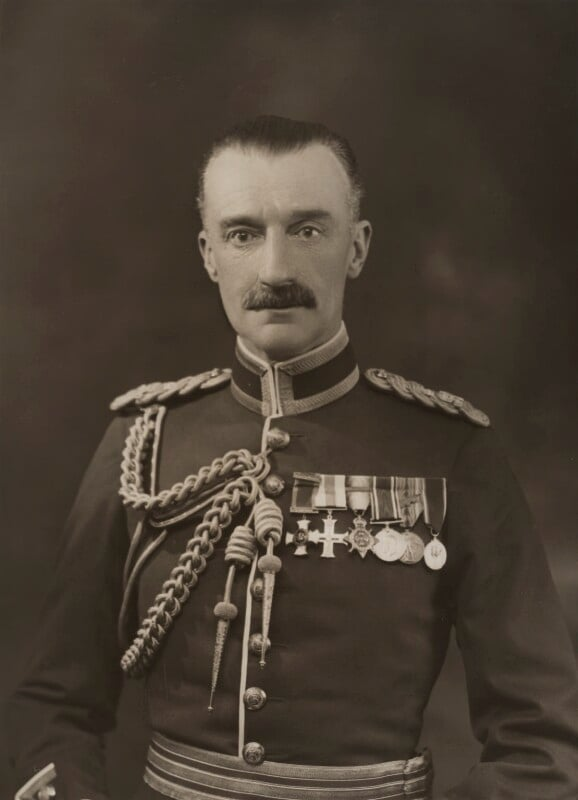
Bullock-Marsham in 1935

Colonel Francis William Bullock-Marsham DSO MC (13 July 1883 – 22 December 1971) was a senior officer in the British Army and an English amateur cricketer who played one first-class cricket match for Kent County Cricket Club and one for Marylebone Cricket Club (MCC), both in 1905. Part of the Marsham family that were involved with Kent County Cricket Club. He was born in Bicester and died in Maidstone.

Bullock-Marsham was educated at Eton College until 1901. He was commissioned a second lieutenant in the 7th (Militia) battalion of the King's Royal Rifle Corps on 26 August 1901, and promoted to a lieutenant on 1 July 1902. Between 1932 and 1936 Bullock-Marsham commanded the 1st Cavalry Brigade with the temporary rank of Brigadier. He was an aide-de-camp to three British monarchs, George V, Edward VII and George VI from 1935 to 1938.

He married on 19 April 1922 Finovola Marianne Eleanor Maclean, widow of Captain Roger Cordy-Simpson.
