= John Marsham (cricketer) =

English cricketer and clergyman

Reverend The Honourable John Marsham
- Born: 25 July 1842; Boxley, Kent, England
- Died: 16 September 1926 (aged 84); Roehampton, London, England
- Education: Downing College, Cambridge
- Spouse: Penelope Hume (m. 1866)
- Children: 11, including Walter
- Father: Charles Marsham
- Relatives: Charles Marsham (brother); Charles Marsham (grandfather); Charles Montagu-Scott (grandfather)

Reverend The Honourable John Marsham (25 July 1842 – 16 September 1926) was an English clergyman and amateur cricketer.

== Biography ==
Marsham was the second son of Charles Marsham, 3rd Earl of Romney. He was born at Boxley House at Boxley south of Maidstone in Kent in 1842 and educated at Eton College. He graduated from Downing College, Cambridge in 1866, having moved to the university from Christ Church, Oxford (matriculated 1860) in 1864.

Marsham was ordained as a deacon at Oxford in 1866 and as a priest 1867. He served as curate at Middleton-Stoney in Oxfordshire between 1866 and 1867 and at Sutton-in-Ashfield in Nottinghamshire between 1867 and 1868 before becoming rector of Barton Seagrave in Northamptonshire in 1868. He remained rector at Barton Seagrave until 1908 before serving as rector and archpriest at Haccombe in Devon until 1912 when he retired. He married Penelope Hume in 1866 and the couple had 11 children. One son, Walter Marsham, played one first-class cricket match for the Gentlemen of India in 1903.

Marsham played two first-class cricket matches for Kent County Cricket Club in 1873. He played non-first-class cricket for a number of amateur teams, including Free Foresters and MCC, as well as for Wellingborough Cricket Club and for Northamptonshire before the club gained first-class status. He was a member of the first Northants committee when the club was formed in 1878.

His brother Charles became the 4th Earl of Romney in 1874. Marsham died at Roehampton in 1926 aged 84.
