= Henry Hoare (cricketer, born 1844) =

English cricketer

Henry William Hoare (1 April 1844 – 7 September 1931) was an English scholar and sportman. He played first-class cricket for Oxford University and other amateur teams in the 1860s.

== Life ==
He was born at Three Bridges, Sussex, England and died at Pimlico, London. He was the son of the cleric William Henry Hoare, of Oakfield, Crawley, Sussex, and his wife Araminta Anne Hamilton (died 1888), daughter of Sir John Hamilton, 1st Baronet, of Woodbrook.

Hoare was educated at Eton College. He matriculated at Balliol College, Oxford in 1862, graduating B.A. in 1866. He was then a classical lecturer at Worcester College, and entered the Inner Temple in 1876.

Hoare's older brother, Hamilton Hoare, played first-class cricket for Sussex. Like his brother, who did it in 1882, Henry Hoare changed his surname to "Hamilton-Hoare" in 1908 in order to benefit from a Hamilton inheritance from the family of his mother.

Besides cricket he was also an athlete, winning hurdles races in the Balliol sports, and later he was a fencer, golfer and angler. In 1870 he joined the then Education Department of the British government, becoming chief clerk in 1893 and assistant secretary of the Board of Education 1900–04.

== Publications ==
- The Evolution of the English Bible: An Historical Sketch of the Successive Versions from 1382 to 1885, John Murray, London, 1901
- The disestablishment question at the present time, SPCK, London, 1906

== Family ==
Hoare married in 1887 Mary Elizabeth Owen, daughter of William Owen of Withybush. They had three daughters:

- Evelyn, married 1902 the Rev. Gerald Gurney Richards
- Muriel, married 1911 Ralph Abercromby Cameron
- Sybil, married 1911 Gerard Moresby Thoroton Hildyard (1874–1956), barrister, son of Henry Hildyard, and was mother of Myles Thoroton Hildyard.
