= Robert Marsham (cricketer) =

English barrister, magistrate, and cricketer

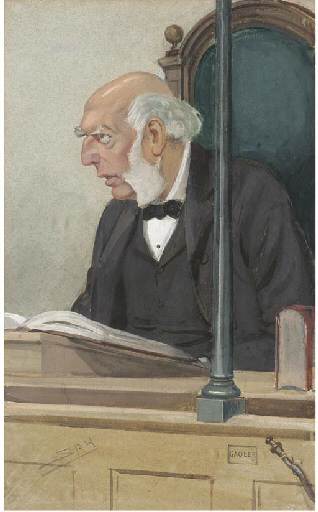
Caricature of Bullock-Marsham on the Bench, by "Spy" (Leslie Ward) in Vanity Fair

Robert Henry Bullock Marsham (3 September 1833 – 5 April 1913) was an English barrister and magistrate, known also as a cricketer, who made appearances for Oxford University and the Marylebone Cricket Club (MCC).

== Life ==
Marsham was born at Merton College, Oxford, the son of Robert Bullock Marsham, the Warden of Merton, and a member of the extended family of the Earl of Romney. His brothers C. D. B. Marsham and Charles Marsham were also cricketers.

Primarily a bowler, Marsham took 35 wickets with his slow-medium roundarm deliveries. His greatest achievement was to bowl MCC to victory against a much stronger Surrey in 1859, where he took twelve wickets in the match. He made many appearances for I Zingari, and also turned out for England against Kent in 1860.

Like his brothers, Marsham studied at Merton College. After graduating at Oxford he studied law, and was called to the bar at Lincoln's Inn in 1860. He was recorder of Maidstone 1868–79 and was also a magistrate. He died in Canterbury in 1913.
