= Charles Hoare (banker) =

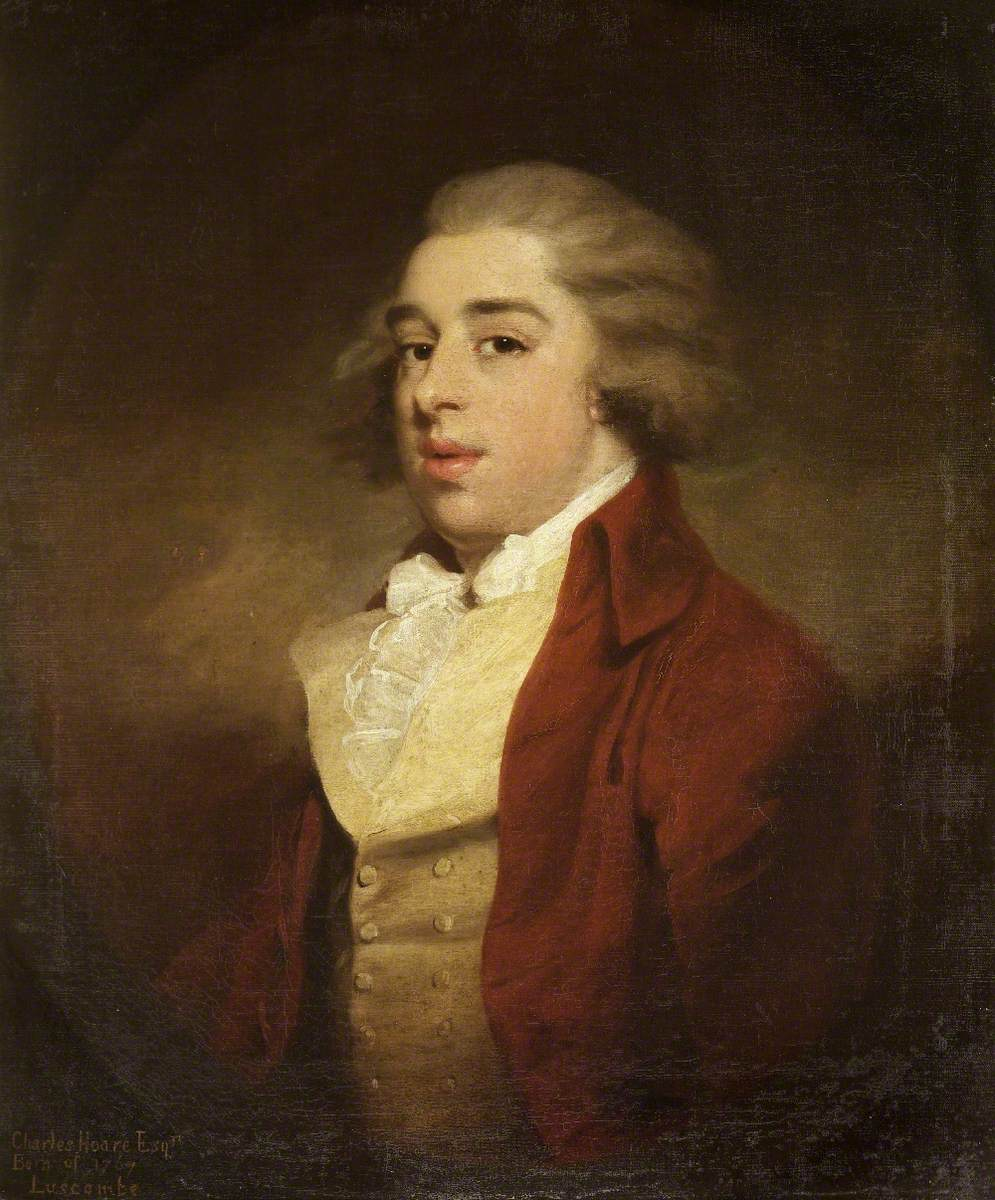
- Organization: C. Hoare & Co
- Father: Sir Richard Hoare, 1st Baronet

Charles Hoare (25 August 1767 – 16 November 1851) was senior partner of the banking firm of C. Hoare & Co.

== Career ==
He was born the son of Sir Richard Hoare, 1st Baronet and Frances Anne Ackland. He was the younger brother of Sir Richard Hoare, 2nd Baronet. He became a Partner in the banking firm C. Hoare & Co in 1787. In 1800 he commissioned John Nash to design Luscombe Castle near Dawlish, Devon for him as a rural retreat. He was elected a Fellow of the Royal Society in 1809.

Hoare initiated the construction of a new banking hall for the bank in 1829. He later became its senior partner. He died at Dawlish in 1851 and, although the bank was not founded by Charles Hoare, it continues to bear his name.

== Family ==
In 1790 Hoare married Frances Dorothea Robinson, the daughter of Sir George Robinson, 5th Baronet; they had no male issue.

== Sources ==
- Hutchings, Victoria (2005). Messrs Hoare, Bankers: A History of the Hoare Banking Dynasty. Constable. ISBN 1-84119-965-6.
