= Charles Marsham (cricketer) =

English cricketer (1829–1901)

Charles Jacob Bullock Marsham (18 January 1829 – 20 August 1901) was an English cricketer, who appeared for Oxford University and Marylebone Cricket Club.

Marsham was born at Merton College, Oxford, the son of Robert Bullock Marsham, the Warden of Merton, and a member of the extended family of the Earl of Romney. Later he was a student at Merton College. He was the brother of C. D. B. Marsham, who was noted as the best amateur bowler in England. Marsham himself played in 38 first-class fixtures, scoring a total of 782 runs and taking 6 wickets. His best innings were against Kent; against whom he scored both of his half-centuries.

His obituary in the 1902 edition of Wisden Cricketers' Almanack described him as "a fine and powerful hitter, especially forward". An original member of the Harlequins, Marsham died at Pall Mall, London in 1901, following a short illness.
