= Charles Hoare (cricketer, born 1851) =

English cricketer (1851–1935)

Charles Twysden Hoare (10 November 1851 – 22 January 1935) was an English first-class cricketer active 1871–78 who played for Middlesex and Surrey. He was born in Mitcham; died in Bicester.
