= Ballard =

Ballard may refer to:

== People ==
- Ballard (given name), a given name (including a list of people with the name)
- Ballard (surname), a surname (including a list of people with the name)

== Places ==
=== Australia ===
- Ballard, Queensland, a locality in the Lockyer Valley Region

=== Ireland ===
- Ballard, Ardnurcher, a townland in Ardnurcher civil parish, barony of Moycashel, County Westmeath
- Ballard, County Clare, a townland
- Ballard, Portloman, a townland in Portloman civil parish, barony of Corkaree, County Westmeath
- Ballard, Rathconrath, a townland in Rathconrath civil parish, barony of Rathconrath, County Westmeath

=== United Kingdom ===
- Ballard Down, an area in Dorset, England
- Ballard, County Armagh, a townland in Northern Ireland

=== United States ===
- Ballard, California, a town in the Santa Ynez Valley
- Ballard, Kentucky, an unincorporated community
- Ballard, Missouri, an unincorporated community in Bates County
- Ballard, Oklahoma, a township in Adair County
- Ballard, Seattle, a neighborhood that was once a city before being annexed by Seattle, Washington
- Ballard, Utah, a town in Uintah County
- Ballard, West Virginia, an unincorporated community in Monroe County
- Ballard County, Kentucky
- Ballardvale, Massachusetts, a village in the town of Andover, Essex County

== Schools ==
- Ballard High School (Louisville), Kentucky, U.S.
- Ballard High School (Seattle), Washington, U.S.
- Ballard Community School District, Iowa, U.S.

== Other uses ==
- Ballard (TV series), a 2025 police-procedural television series
- Ballard Power Systems, noted for its fuel cell research
- USS Ballard (DD-267), a Clemson-class destroyer, commissioned in 1919 and decommissioned in 1945
- Ballard Institute and Museum of Puppetry, in Storrs, Connecticut

== See also ==
- Balard (disambiguation)
- Ballad (disambiguation)
- Bollard (disambiguation)
