= Ballard (surname) =

Ballard is a surname of English origin. It likely derives from Middle English "ball," meaning "white spot," plus the suffix "-ard," and would therefore mean "bald head." Indeed, Wyclif translated 2 Kings 2:23 as "Stye up, ballard," where Coverdale translated the same passage as "Come up here thou balde head."

There are other sources for this name, besides the Anglo-Saxon. Not all people bearing the name are of English origins. It is common, with native etymology among several Celtic nations, although the British Celtic form is likely the original, and it may be that "Bald head" is a false etymology designed to give the name English roots. The earliest form is Ap Alard, meaning the "son of the fox" in Welsh, and it passed from Wales to Brittany as Aballard, whence it became popular in France under the form Aballaird, and thence to Spain.

== People with the surname Ballard ==
=== Arts, music, and writing ===
- Agnes Ballard (1877–1969), American architect and educator
- Alimi Ballard (born 1977), American actor
- Clint Ballard Jr. (1931–2008), American songwriter
- Edward George Ballard (1791–1860) English miscellaneous writer
- Florence Ballard (1943–1976), American pop singer
- Frank Ballard (1929–2010), American puppeteer
- Frankie Ballard (born 1982), American country music singer
- George Ballard (c. 1706–1755), English antiquary and biographer
- Glen Ballard (born 1953), American songwriter and record producer
- Hank Ballard (1936–2003), American singer/songwriter
- J. G. Ballard (1930–2009), British writer
- Kaye Ballard (1925–2019), American actress, singer, and comedian
- Lucien Ballard (1908–1988), American cinematographer
- Mary Canfield Ballard (1852–1927), American poet
- Mia Ballard, American author
- Robert Ballard II (c. 1575–1645), French Baroque lutenist and composer
- Russ Ballard (born 1945), English singer/songwriter and musician
- Simone Ballard (1897–1978), French opera singer
- Tom Ballard (comedian) (born 1989), Australian comedian and radio presenter

=== Military and politics ===
- Barbara Ballard (born 1944), American politician
- Bethany Ballard, American politician
- Bland Ballard (1761–1853), American soldier and politician
- Charles Ballard (politician) (1836–1891), U.S. politician in Connecticut
- Clinton B. Ballard (1860–1946), American politician
- Colin Robert Ballard, (1868–1941), Brigadier-General in the British Army and military author
- Donald E. Ballard (born 1945), American soldier
- Don Ballard (1927–2019), American politician and lawyer
- Edward J. Ballard (c. 1790–1813), American naval officer
- George Alexander Ballard (1862–1948), British naval officer
- Greg Ballard (born 1954), American politician
- Jackie Ballard (born 1953), British politician and journalist
- John Archibald Ballard (1829–1880), British Lieutenant General
- John S. Ballard (1922–2012), American politician
- Samuel James Ballard (1765–1829), Vice-Admiral in the Royal Navy
- Thomas Ballard (1630–1690), Virginia colonial politician
- Volant Vashon Ballard (c. 1774–1832), Rear-Admiral of the Royal Navy, Companion of the Bath

=== Science and medicine ===
- Claudius Ballard (1890–1967), American physician
- Dana H. Ballard (1946–2022), American computer scientist and vision researcher
- Edward Ballard (1820–1897), English physician
- Geoffrey Ballard (1932–2008), Canadian geophysicist and entrepreneur
- Guy Ballard (1878–1939), American mining engineer and Theosophist
- Martha Ballard (c. 1734–1812), American midwife and diarist
- Megan Ballard, American acoustical engineer and oceanographer
- Robert Ballard (born 1942), American marine geologist and submarine explorer
- Sarah Ballard (1983 or 1984–), astronomer

=== Sports ===
- Charkey Ramon (born Dave Bruce Ballard in 1950), Australian boxer of the 1970s, and referee of the 1970s and '80s
- Charles Ballard (active 1922–27), New Zealand footballer
- Chris Ballard (born 1973), American sports journalist
- Dan Ballard (footballer) (born 1999), British professional footballer, Sunderland and Blackpool
- Del Ballard Jr. (born 1963), American professional bowler
- Greg Ballard (basketball) (1955–2016), American basketball player
- Jake Ballard (born 1987), American National Football League player
- Jeff Ballard (born 1963), American Major League Baseball pitcher
- Keith Ballard (born 1982), American ice hockey player
- Lulu Ballard (1908–1981), American tennis player
- Tom Ballard (born 1988), British mountaineer

=== Other ===
- Adolphus Ballard (1867–1915), English historian
- Antony J. Ballard, English celebrity chef
- Edward Goodwin Ballard (1910–1989), American philosopher
- Harold Ballard (1903–90), Canadian businessman
- John Ballard (died 1586), English Jesuit priest and conspirator against Elizabeth I
- M. Russell Ballard (1928–2023), American businessman and Apostle of The Church of Jesus Christ of Latter-day Saints
- Melvin J. Ballard (1873–1939), American Apostle of The Church of Jesus Christ of Latter-day Saints
- Tracey Ballard, considered the first openly gay employee of the CIA
- William Rankin Ballard (1847–1929), American banker and land developer

== See also ==
- Balard (disambiguation) § People with the surname Balard
- Ballard (given name)
- Bollard (surname)
