= Bollard (surname) =

Bollard is a surname. Notable people with the name include:

- Alan Bollard (born 1951), governor of the Reserve Bank of New Zealand
- Arthur Bollard (1879−1919), Australian rugby league footballer
- Barbara Bollard, New Zealand academic
- David Bollard (born 1942), Australian pianist
- John Bollard (judge) (1940–2009), New Zealand judge
- John Bollard (politician) (1839–1915), New Zealand politician
- John Bollard (Catholic priest) (born 1965), former Jesuit who sued the Society of Jesus over claims of sexual harassment
- Richard Bollard (1863–1927), New Zealand politician
- Ted Bollard (1920–2011), New Zealand plant physiologist and science administrator
- Tom Bollard (1890–1920), Australian rules footballer

== See also ==
- Ballard (surname)
