= Ballad (disambiguation) =

Ballad is a form of narrative poetry, often put to music, or a type of sentimental love song in modern popular music.

Ballad or Ballade may also refer to:

== Music ==
=== Genres and forms ===
- Ballade (classical music), a musical setting of a literary ballad, or a romantic instrumental piece, especially for piano
- Ballade (forme fixe), a French poetic and musical form common in the 14th and 15th centuries
- Ballata, a similar Italian poetic and musical form
- Sentimental ballad, a style of popular music, in many genres, that often deals with romantic relationships
  - Korean ballad, a genre popular since the 1980s
  - Latin ballad, a genre that originated in the 1960s in Spain and Latin America

=== Classical compositions ===
- Ballad (John Ireland), a 1929 composition for piano by John Ireland
- Ballad, a composition by Stravinsky
- Ballad, a composition by Arnold Bax
- Ballad, a composition by Paul Ben-Haim
- Ballad, a composition by Eric Coates
- Ballad, a composition by Sibelius
- Ballade (Balanchine), a ballet by George Balanchine
- Ballade (Robbins), a ballet by Jerome Robbins
- Ballades, Op. 10 (Brahms)
- Ballades (Chopin), 1831–1842
- Ballade (Dvořák), 1884

=== Performers ===
- The Ballads (group), a 1960s American R&B vocal group

=== Albums ===
- Ballads (Derek Bailey album), 2002
- Ballads (Mary J. Blige album), 2000
- Ballads (Liane Carroll album), 2013
- Ballads (John Coltrane album), 1962
- Ballads (David Murray album), 1988
- Ballads (Richard Marx album)
- Ballads (Despina Vandi album)
- Ballads (Earl Klugh album), 1993
- Ballads (Harem Scarem album), 1999
- Ballads (Paul Bley album), 1971
- Ballads (Ken Stubbs album), 2000
- Ballads, an album by Burl Ives
- Ballads - The Love Song Collection, a 2003 album by Boyzone
- The Ballads (Mariah Carey album), 2009
- The Ballads (REO Speedwagon album), 1999
- The Ballads (Doro album)
- Ballads 1, a 2018 album by Joji

=== Songs ===
- "Ballad" (Ayumi Hamasaki song), 2009
- "Ballad (Namonaki Koi no Uta)", by Alan, 2009
- "Ballad", by Vangelis from Spiral
- "The Ballad", by Bang Camaro from Bang Camaro
- "The Ballad", by Blur from The Ballad of Darren
- "The Ballad", by Testament from Practice What You Preach

== Other uses ==
- "Ballad" (Glee), a television episode
- Ballad, a 2009 movie starring Tsuyoshi Kusanagi
- Ballade, a typeface designed in 1938 by Paul Renner
- Honda Ballade, a compact car
- Ballade, a character from Mega Man IV and Mega Man V

== See also ==
- Balada (disambiguation)
- Balad (disambiguation)
- Balade, a locality in New Caledonia
- Ballad Films, an Australian film distribution company
- Ballada (album), a 2014 album by Namie Amuro
- Ballard (disambiguation)
