= General Ballard =

General Ballard may refer to:

- Colin Robert Ballard (1868–1941), British Army brigadier general
- Joe N. Ballard (born 1942), U.S. Army lieutenant general
- John Archibald Ballard (1829–1880), British Army lieutenant general
