= USS Ballard =

Two ships of the United States Navy have been named Ballard, after Edward J. Ballard.

- USS Ballard (1813), a small galley sold in 1816.
- USS Ballard (DD-267), a Clemson-class destroyer commissioned in 1919 and decommissioned in 1945.
