= Mumbai Port =

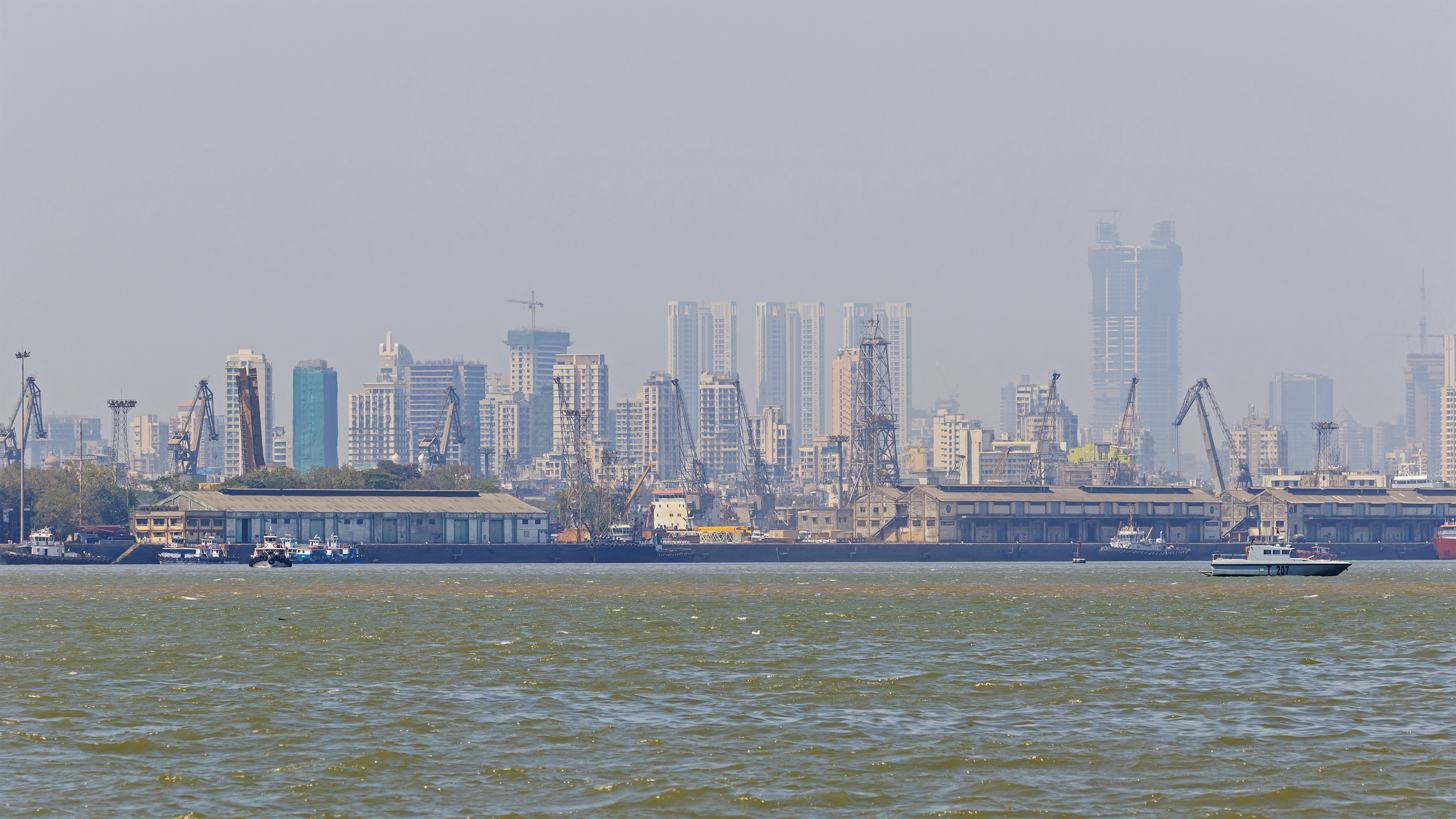
- A section of Mumbai Port seen along the waterfront, with the city skyline in the backdrop.
- Interactive map of Mumbai Port
- Location within India
- Native name: मुंबई बंदर (Marathi)

Location
- Country: India
- Location: Mumbai, Maharashtra
- Coordinates: 18°56′41.687″N 72°50′38.909″E
- UN/LOCODE: INBOM

Details
- Opened: 26 June 1873 (153 years ago)
- Operated by: Mumbai Port Authority
- Owned by: Government of India
- Size of harbour: 400 square kilometres (150 sq mi)
- No. of berths: 33
- No. of wharfs: 5
- Length of approach channel: 30.4 kilometres (18.9 mi)
- Employees: 2,697 (2024–25)
- Chairperson: Dr. M Angamuthu, IAS
- Deputy Chairperson: Adesh Titarmare, IAS

Statistics
- Vessel arrivals: 7,874 vessels (2024–25)
- Annual cargo tonnage: 68.63 million tonnes (2024–25)
- Annual container volume: 552 TEU (2024–25)
- Passenger traffic: 264,643
- Website mumbaiport.gov.in

Mumbai Port (also known as the Bombay Port) is a port which lies midway on the west coast of India, on the natural deep-water Mumbai harbour in Maharashtra. The harbour spread over 400 square kilometres (150 mi^{2}) is protected by the mainland of Konkan to its east and north and by the island city of Mumbai (Bombay) to its west. The harbour opens to the south to the Arabian Sea.

The port is administered by the Mumbai Port Authority (MbPA), an statutory body of the Government of India. Originally established as the Bombay Port Trust (BPT) in 1873, it was renamed the Mumbai Port Trust (MbPT) following the city's renaming, and finally transitioned to its current legal title on 31 January 2022 under the Major Port Authorities Act, 2021. The port is primarily used for bulk cargo, while most container traffic is directed to Nhava Sheva port across the harbour.

== History ==
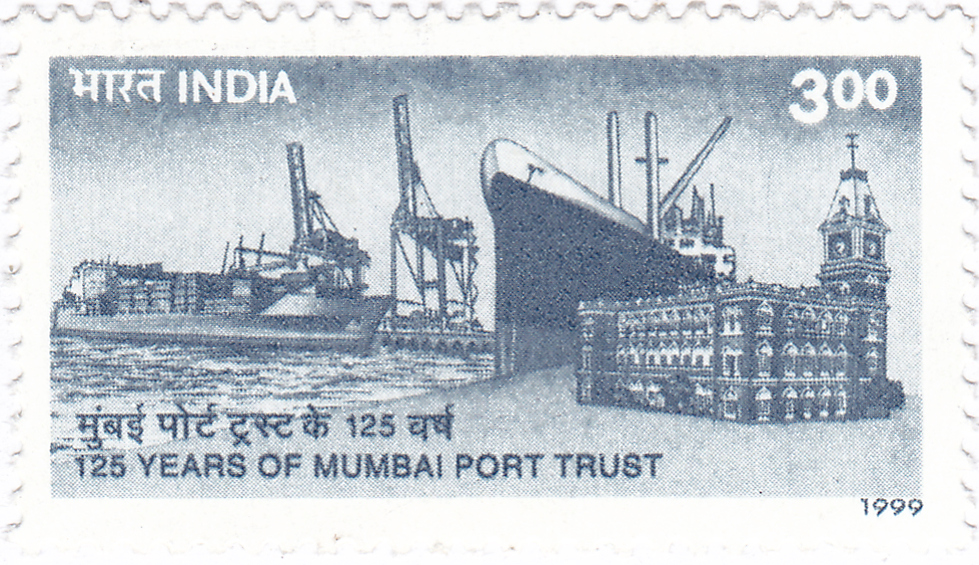
A 1999 stamp dedicated to the 125th anniversary of Mumbai Port Trust

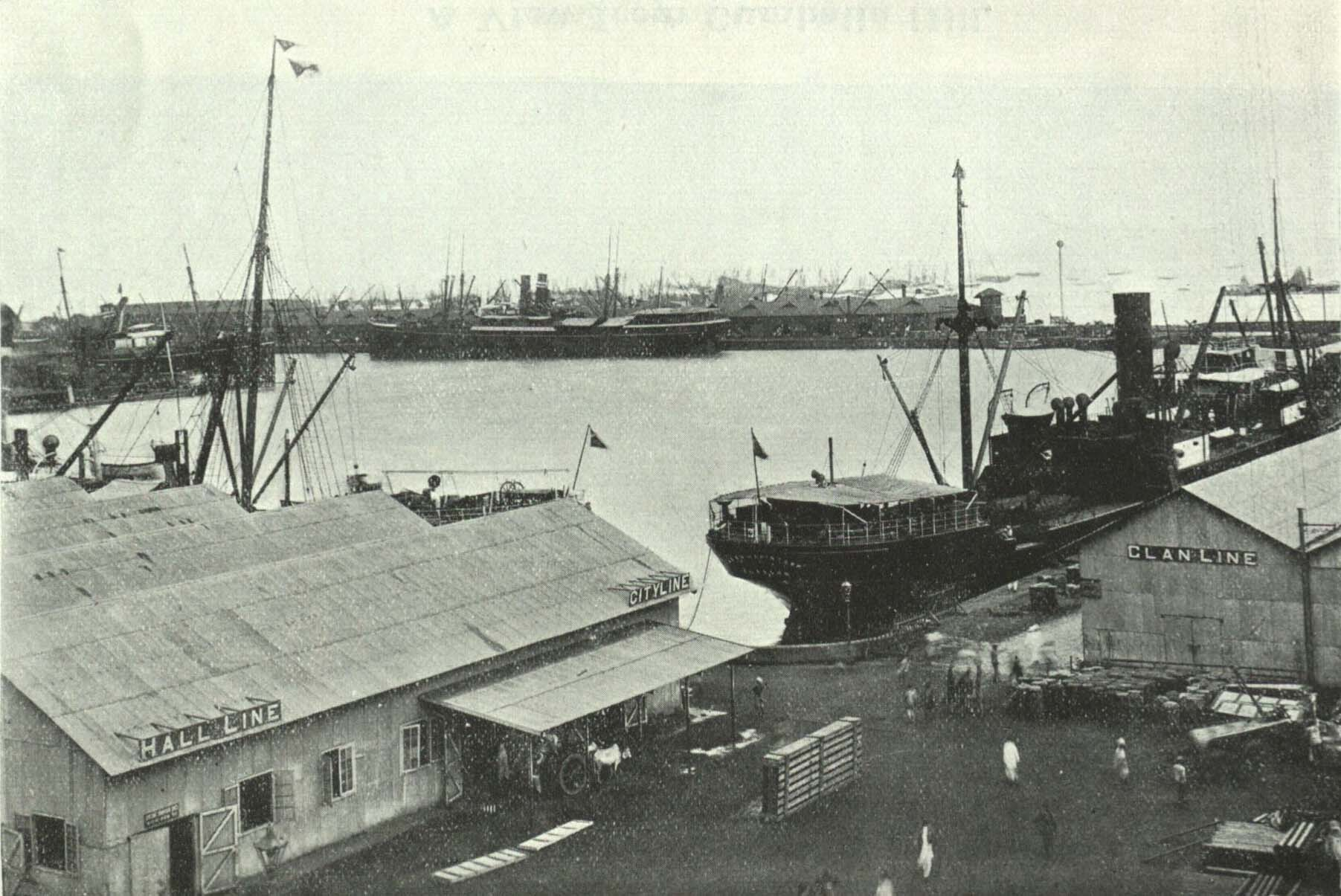
The Prince's Dock of Bombay Harbour, c. 1906

Mumbai Harbour has been used by ships and boats for centuries. It was used by the Maratha Navy, as well as the British and Portuguese colonial navies. In 1652, the Surat Council of the East India Company, realising the geographical advantage of the Port, urged its purchase from the Portuguese. Their wish was gratified nine years later when, under the Marriage Treaty between Charles II of Great Britain and the Infant Catherine of Portugal, the ‘Port and Island of Bombay’ were transferred to the king of Great Britain The first of the present-day docks of the Port were built in the 1870s. Bombay Port Trust (BPT) was established as a corporation on 26 June 1873. BPT's founding chairman was Colonel J.A. Ballard.

Port development was undertaken by the civil engineering partnership Sir John Wolfe-Barry and Lt Col Arthur John Barry as Joint Consulting Engineers to the Bombay Port Trust at the end of the nineteenth century.

From its establishment, the port has been the gateway to India, and was a primary factor in the emergence of Mumbai as the commercial capital of India. The port and the corporation took their present names in the 1990s.

Over the decades, the port underwent tremendous expansion, with the addition of berths and cargo handling capacities. However, Mumbai's expanding growth and population pressure constrained the growth of the port by the 1970s. This led to the establishment of the Nhava Sheva port across Mumbai Harbour in Navi Mumbai on the Konkan mainland. Nhava Sheva began operations in 1989, and most container traffic now flows through Nhava Sheva. With a minimum draft of 6.9 metres (23 ft). Victoria Dock, commissioned in 1891, had 14 berths as of 2008 with a minimum draft of 6.7 metres (22 ft). Indira Dock, commissioned in 1914, had 21 berths, with a minimum draft of 7.0 metres (23.0 ft). Prince's Dock and Victoria Dock are semi-tidal docks, with vessels docking and departing at high tide. Indira Dock has a lock, enabling vessels to enter or depart at any time.

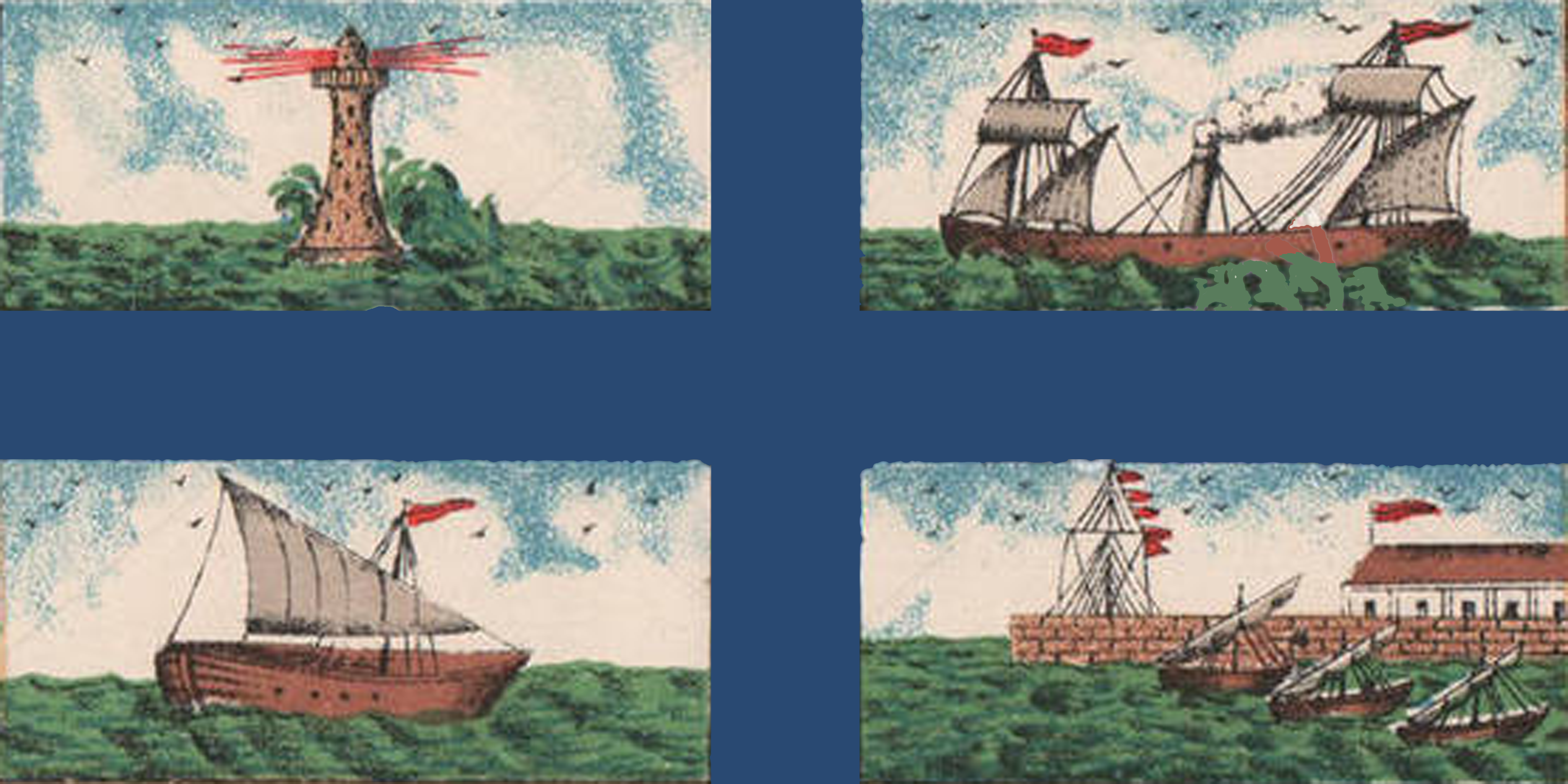
Flag of the Trustees of the Port of Bombay during British Raj

The port has four jetties on Jawahar Dweep, an island in the harbour, for handling crude and petroleum products. These jetties have a draft of 12.2 metres (40 ft). Liquid chemicals are handled from a jetty on Pirpau.

Ballard Pier Extension has a passenger terminal, including immigration clearance facilities for crews and passengers of cruise liners.

The port has a total of 69 anchorage points. A pilot is mandatory for all vessels of over 100 tonnes net weightage.

== See also ==
- List of ports in India
- Chhatrapati Shivaji Maharaj International Airport
- Nhava Sheva Port
