= Soke (legal) =

Early medieval legal concept

The term soke (/ˈsoʊk/; in Old English: soc, connected ultimately with secan, "to seek"), at the time of the Norman Conquest of England, generally denoted "jurisdiction", but its vague usage makes it lack a single, precise definition.

== Anglo-Saxon origins ==
The phrase 'Sac and soc' was used in early English for the right to hold a court (the primary meaning of 'soc' seems to have involved seeking; thus soka faldae was the duty of seeking the lord's court, just as secta ad molendinum was the duty of seeking the lord's mill).

According to many scholars, such as Frank Stenton and H. P. R. Finberg, "... the Danelaw was an especially 'free' area of Britain because the rank and file of the Danish armies, from whom sokemen were descended, had settled in the area and imported their own social system."

Historians such as Paul Vinogradoff considered royal grants of sac and soc as opening the way for national to be replaced by local justice, through the creation of immunities or franchises. As G. M. Trevelyan wrote, "by grants of sac and soc private justice was encroaching on public justice". Other scholars have viewed the judicial powers represented by the Anglo-Saxon Soke as rather limited. The standard grant of sac et soc, toll et team et infangthief represented the equivalent of the authority of the reeve at the hundred court, impinging on royal justice, for instance, in the right to slay a thief caught red-handed (infangentheof).

=== Sokemen ===
A sokeman belonged to a class of tenants, found chiefly in the eastern counties, especially the Danelaw, occupying an intermediate position between the free tenants and the bond tenants, in that they owned and paid taxes on their land themselves. Forming between 30% and 50% of the countryside, they could buy and sell their land, but owed service to their lord's soke, court, or jurisdiction. (But Adolphus Ballard argued that a sokeman was a man who rendered service from a sokeland, and was not necessarily under jurisdiction).

Sokemen remained an important rural element after the Conquest, buying and selling property, and providing their overlords with money rents and court attendance, rather than manorial labour. According to the Ely Inquiry, the terms of remit for the Domesday Book of 1086 specified determining for each manor "how many freemen; how many sokemen...and how much each freeman and sokeman had and has".

== Later developments ==
After the Norman Conquest, doubt developed over the precise meaning of the word soke. In some versions of the much-used tract Interpretationes vocabulorum, "soke" is defined: aver fraunc court (Norman for ‘to have a free court’), and in others as interpellacio maioris audientiae, which glosses somewhat ambiguously as claim ajustis et requeste: thus sometimes soke denoted the right to hold a court, especially when associated with sak or sake in the alliterative binomial expression sake and soke (soc and sac). In later years the Law French name oyer and terminer came to mean the commission by which judges of assize were commanded to make inquiry.

Sometimes only the right to receive the fines and forfeitures of the men over whom it was granted when they had been condemned in a court of competent jurisdiction. The Leges also speaks of pleas in socna, id est, in quaestione sua (‘pleas which are in his investigation’).

Ballard in the early twentieth century argued that the interpretation of the word "soke" as jurisdiction should be accepted only where it stands for the fuller phrase, "sake and soke", and that "soke" standing by itself denoted services. Certainly, many passages in the Domesday Book support this contention, but in other passages "soke" seems to serve merely as a short expression for "sake and soke".

== Territorial ==
The term soke, unlike sake, sometimes applied to the district over which the right of jurisdiction extended (compare Soke of Peterborough). By the same usage, it could designate the ward of a town, as with Aldgate in the charters of Henry I.

== Legal terminology ==
The law term, socage, used of this tenure, arose by adding the French suffix -age to soc.

== See also ==
- History of English land law
- Soke used in place-names:
  - Portsoken, a district in the City of London
  - Soke of Peterborough, Cambridgeshire
  - Eaton Socon, Cambridgeshire
  - Thorpe-le-Soken, Essex
  - Kirby-le-Soken, Essex
  - Walton-le-Soken, Essex
  - Liberty of the Soke, Winchester
- Socken
