= Samuel Ballard =

Samuel Ballard may refer to:

- S. Thruston Ballard (1855–1926), American politician in Kentucky
- Samuel James Ballard (1765–1829), Royal Navy admiral

== See also ==
- Ballard (surname)
