= Balad =

Balad may refer to:

== Places ==
- Balad, Iran
- Bir-e Bala or Bālād, Konarak, Iran
- Balad, Iraq
- Balad Air Base, Iraq
- Balad District, Iraq
- Joint Base Balad, Iraq
- Al-Balad, Jeddah, Saudi Arabia
- Balad, Somalia
- Balad District, Somalia

== Other uses ==
- Balad (political party), an Arab-Israeli political party
- Al-Balad (newspaper), a defunct newspaper in Lebanon

== See also ==
- Al-Balad, Surah of the Quran
- Balat (Istanbul), Turkey, Istanbul's traditional Jewish quarter
- Balada (disambiguation)
- Ballad (disambiguation)
- Eski Mosul, a place in Iraq formerly known as Balad
