= John Ballard =

John Ballard may refer to:

- John Ballard (Jesuit) (died 1586), English Jesuit priest executed for being involved in an attempt to assassinate Queen Elizabeth I of England
- John Ballard (record producer) (born 1951), Scottish singer-songwriter and record producer
- John Archibald Ballard (1829–1880), British soldier
