= Balada =

Balada may refer to:

- Balada or baladesc, an Occitan literary genre related to dansa
- Balada, a village in the municipal term of Sant Jaume d'Enveja, Spain
- Leonardo Balada (born 1933), Catalan American composer
- "Balada romántica", as Latin ballad is known in Spanish
- "Balada" (song), a 2011 Portuguese song by Gusttavo Lima

== See also ==
- Balad (disambiguation)
- Ballad (disambiguation)
