= Ballard (given name) =

Ballard is a given name. Notable people with the name include:

- Ballard Berkeley (1904–1988), English actor
- Ballard Campbell, American historian
- Ballard MacDonald (1882–1935), American lyricist
- Ballard Smith (baseball) (born 1946), American sports executive, district attorney
- Ballard Smith (Virginia politician), American politician

== See also ==
- Ballard (surname)
