= Helene Marsh =

Australian scientist and academic (born 1945)

Helene Denise Marsh AO FAA FTSE
- Born: 8 April 1945 (age 79); Sydney, New South Wales, Australia
- Education: BSc(Hons.) in Zoology; PhD in Zoology
- Alma mater: University of Queensland; James Cook University
- Spouse: Lachlan Marsh
- Awards: Award for Contribution to Sirenian Research, Society of Marine Mammalogy (2001); Distinguished Service Award, Society of Conservation Biology (2008); Aldo Leopald Award, American Society of Mammalogy (2009)
- Scientific career
- Fields: Zoology, Ecology, Environmental Science, Conservation, Marine, Mammals, Indigenous
- Doctoral students: Barbara Bollard
- Website: http://www.helenemarsh.com/

Helene Denise Marsh (born 8 April 1945) is an Australian scientist who has provided research in the field of Environmental Science, more specifically Zoology and Ecology. The focal point of her research has been the biology of dugongs, with particular foci in the areas of population ecology, history, reproduction, diet, and movements. She is the Dean of Graduate Research Studies and the Professor of Environmental Science at James Cook University in Queensland, Australia, and also a Distinguished Professor in the College of Marine and Environmental Science. Marsh is also a program leader for the Marine and Tropical Research Science Facility. In 2015 she was elected a Fellow of both the Australian Academy of Science (FAA), and the Australian Academy of Technological Sciences and Engineering (FTSE). She was appointed Officer of the Order of Australia (AO) in the 2021 Australia Day Honours.

== Early life ==
Marsh's parents always encouraged her to succeed academically, placing value on learning and education throughout her childhood, and expected that all three of their children would eventually attend a university. Her mother started out as a teacher, then when World War II began she enlisted and became the only woman education officer in the Army from Northern Territory. After the war she earned her master's degree. Her father earned degrees in both Economics and Law; he died when Marsh was 13 years old. She has two brothers, one became a Professor of English at the University of London, while the other made films.

== Education ==
Marsh graduated from the University of Queensland in 1968, earning a Bachelor of Science with Honors in Zoology, going on to earn her PhD in Zoology from James Cook University in 1973. In 1991 Marsh became a Professor of Zoology and Director of Environmental Studies at James Cook University, staying in this position until 1994. In 1994 she became the Professor of Environmental Science and the Head of the Department of Tropical Environmental Studies and Geography. In 2000 Marsh became the Dean of Postgraduate Studies. Over the course of her career she has also assisted and supervised 55 PhD and 20 Master's candidates through to their completion.

== Career ==
After earning her bachelor's degree in 1968, Marsh began work for the Commonwealth Scientific and Industrial Research Organisation (CSIRO) in 1968 as an Experimental Officer in Animal Health at the CSIRO research laboratory in Townsville, Queensland. In 1972 she worked as an Honorary Research Associate at the British Museum of Natural History. After two years she returned to James Cook University where she was appointed as a Research Officer in Zoology, eventually being promoted to the part-time position of Research Fellow in Zoology in 1976. She switched to full-time in 1981. Through the 1980s and 1990s she secured multiple positions on various committees at James Cook University.

Year	Position
1966-1967	Demonstrator of Zoology, University of Queensland
1972	Honorary Research Associate, British Museum (Natural History)
1974-1975	Research Officer in Zoology (part-time), James Cook University
1976-1981	Research Fellow in Zoology (part-time), James Cook University
1981-1987	Research Fellow in Zoology (full-time), James Cook University
1985–Present	Chair of the Sirenia Special Survival Commission of the International Union for the Conservation of Nature
1987-1989	Senior Lecturer in Zoology / Coordinator of MSc program in Tropical Ecology, James Cook University
1989–Present	Chairman of the Great Barrier Reef Consultative Committee
1990-1991	Associate Professor in Zoology, James Cook University
1991-1992	Chairman of the Queensland Marine Parks Consultative Committee
1991-1994	Professor of Zoology / Director of Environmental Studies, James Cook University
1994–Present	Professor of Environmental Science / Head of the Department of Tropical Environment Studies and Geography, James Cook University
1994-1997	President of the Australian Mammal Society
2000–Present	Dean of Postgraduate Studies, James Cook University
2012–2014	President of the Society for Marine Mammalogy

== Research ==
The majority of Marsh's research involves the ecology and conservation biology of dugongs and other megafauna, providing advancements in the understanding, management, and care of coastal marine mammals. Her research has covered marine conservation biology, marine natural resource management, indigenous marine resource management, conservation intervention, and marine wildlife population ecology. Notable doctoral students of Marsh's include Barbara Bollard.

== Publications ==
Marsh has authored, co-authored, or assisted in over 200 published works. About 100 of these are articles for established journals, one book, several chapters for various books and encyclopedias, technical reports, and conference proceedings.

== Honours ==
Year	Award
1983	Australian Woman Scientist of the Year, New Idea magazine
1991	Personal Chair, James Cook University
1998	Pew Charitable Trust Fellowship in Marine Conservation
2001	Award for Contribution to Sirenian Research, Society of Marine Mammalogy
2002	Honorary Member, Golden Key Honour Society
2008	Distinguished Service Award, Society of Conservation Biology
2009	Aldo Leopold Award, American Society of Mammalogy
2015	Fellow of the Australian Academy of Science
2018	University of Queensland Alumnus of the Year
2021	Officer of the Order of Australia
