= Bollard =

Bollard may refer to:

- Traffic bollards, a short vertical post used for traffic control and security
- Mooring bollards, a short vertical post used to secure ropes for towing or docking
- Bollard (surname), includes a list of people with the name
- The Bollard, an alternative news publication in Portland, Maine
- USCGC Bollard, a US Coast Guard cutter operating in Long Island Sound and north to Narragansett Bay
- Bollard, snow or ice shaped to form an anchor point, in mountaineering
- Bollard pull, a measure of the pulling power of a watercraft
