= Antony J. Ballard =

American chef and businessman

- Born: Antony J. Ballard

Antony J. Ballard is an English personal celebrity chef and businessman.

== Life and career ==
Ballard is a personal chef to celebrities. His clients have included Bruce Willis, Chevy Chase, Michael Crichton, and at special events who included Paul McCartney, Ringo Starr, Liza Minnelli, Keith Richards, and others.

Ballard never attended a culinary school, saying "For me, it was trial by fire." At age 19, Ballard initially worked at the resort Bournemouth Highcliff Marriott Hotel in England where he received a "traditional, rigorous training." In 1980, he moved to the USA where he worked for 11 years as executive chef at the Grolier Club in New York City. It was here that he was introduced to many high-profile opportunities. He then branched out on his own and opened a gourmet shop A Thyme for Change in North Salem, but closed it a few years later. In 1993, Ballard began a 5-year position as personal chef for Michael Crichton, saying that Crichton "just wanted a restaurant-quality lifestyle without ever having to step foot [sic] out of his house."

Other companies he started include Ballard Famous Chef Products LLC and ChefAntonyJBallard.com.

Ballard is an active firefighter in the Croton Falls Fire Department. He has two children.

== Bibliography ==
- Food and Shelter (2013)
