= Barbara Bollard =

New Zealand spatial ecologist

Academic background
- Education: James Cook University
- Thesis: Integrating social and biophysical data to develop and evaluate marine protected area planning at a local scale: the 1998 Cairns Area Plan of Management as a case study (2006)
- Doctoral advisor: Helene Marsh

Barbara Anne Bollard also known as Barbara Breen and Bollard-Breen, is a New Zealand academic, and is a professor at University of Wollongong. She was previously a full professor at Auckland University of Technology, specialising in using remote sensing and drones to map and manage conservation areas.

== Academic career ==
Bollard attributes her love of science to her father, New Zealander John Bollard, who was involved in the development of solid fuel propellants for the US space programme, and had been involved in training John Glenn. Bollard completed a PhD titled Integrating social and biophysical data to develop and evaluate marine protected area planning at a local scale: the 1998 Cairns Area Plan of Management as a case study at James Cook University in 2006. Bollard then joined the faculty of Auckland University of Technology, rising to full professor in 2022. She is now a professor at the University of Wollongong.

Bollard's describes herself as a "techno-nerd". Her research focuses on using geospatial mapping, including remote sensing and drone technology, for the identification and management of protected areas. She has used these techniques to map three areas in Antarctica, as well as deserts in Namibia. She is also exploring how the three-dimensional maps created for conservation planning can also be used in gaming, allowing a virtual experience of remote environments. Bollard's work to create a photo-mosaic of the area around Scott Base was featured in the National Geographic and Antarctica New Zealand-produced programme Continent 7: Dangerous Science. In summer 2023 Bollard worked with researchers from the University of Wollongong and Queensland University of Technology on an Australian Antarctic Division project to map moss beds around Casey Station, to better understand the areas at risk and the effects of climate change.

== Selected works ==
- Abdul Nishar; Steve Richards; Dan Breen; John Robertson; Bollard, Barbara (2016). "Thermal infrared imaging of geothermal environments and by an unmanned aerial vehicle (UAV): A case study of the Wairakei – Tauhara geothermal field, Taupo, New Zealand". Renewable Energy. 86: 1256–1264. doi:10.1016/j.renene.2015.09.042. Wikidata Q124153002.
- Lorenzo Fiori; Ashray Doshi; Emmanuelle Martinez; Mark B. Orams; Bollard, Barbara (2017). "The Use of Unmanned Aerial Systems in Marine Mammal Research". Remote Sensing. 9 (6): 543. doi:10.3390/rs9060543. Wikidata Q124153003.
- Rebecca M. Jarvis; Bollard, Barbara; Krägeloh, Christian; D. Rex Billington (2015). "Citizen science and the power of public participation in marine spatial planning". Marine Policy. 57: 21–26. doi:10.1016/j.marpol.2015.03.011. Wikidata Q73141112.
- Helene Marsh; Carole Eros; Peter Corkeron; Bollard, Barbara (1999). "A conservation strategy for dugongs: implications of Australian research". Marine and Freshwater Research. doi:10.1071/mf99080. Wikidata Q124153012.
- Bollard, Barbara; Ashray Doshi; Neil Gilbert; Ceisha Poirot; Len Gillman (2022). "Drone Technology for Monitoring Protected Areas in Remote and Fragile Environments". Drones. 6 (2): 42. doi:10.3390/drones6020042. Wikidata Q124152950.
