= Balard =

Balard may refer to:

- Balard station, a Paris Metro station

== People with the surname Balard ==
- Antoine Jérôme Balard (1802–1876), French chemist
- Arnaud Balard (born 1971), French deafblind artist
- Max Balard (born 2000), Australian footballer

== See also ==
- Ballard (disambiguation)
