= Ballad (Ayumi Hamasaki song) =

Single by Ayumi Hamasaki

from the album Rock 'n' Roll Circus
- Released: December 29, 2009
- Recorded: 2009
- Genre: You Were...: Pop rock, soft rock Ballad: J-pop
- Label: Avex Trax
- Songwriters: Ayumi Hamasaki (lyrics); Kazuhiro Hara (music); DAI (music); Tetsuya Yukumi (music)
- Producer: Max Matsuura

Ayumi Hamasaki singles chronology
"You Were..." (2009)	"Ballad" (2009)	"Moon/Blossom" (2010)

CD+ DVD version A

CD+DVD version B

"You Were.../Ballad" is Japanese singer Ayumi Hamasaki's forty-seventh (forty-eighth overall) single, released on December 29, 2009. The single was intended to be released on December 16, but Avex Trax pushed the release date two weeks back. The first song on the single "You were..." is the theme song for the Japanese version of the Disney movie Tinker Bell and the Lost Treasure, while the second song "Ballad" is tied up with The Firmament of the Pleiades, a NHK's historical and political drama based on Jiro Asada's book of the same name. The single became Hamasaki's 22nd consecutive single to debut at number-one position since her 2002 single "Free & Easy" on the Oricon weekly charts, making her the first solo artist and the female artist to have 22 consecutive singles to debut at number-one position. It is also her 34th number-one single on the Oricon weekly charts.

== Promotion ==
During December 2009, Hamasaki performed live on Japanese TV shows seven times. Hamasaki was featured on the cover of four Japanese magazines during the promotion of the single. These magazines were "Sweet", "Bea's Up", "Vivi" and "S Cawaii". As of early December, there have been many promotional pictures posted around Shibuya, Shinagawa and Harajuku in Tokyo.

== Music videos ==
You Were featured Ayumi at a winter-like scene wearing a blinking, electrically-lit dress. The video is also inter-cut with scenes of models posing in haute couture outfits.

The video for Ballad featured an elaborate storyline where Ayumi and her boyfriend get in a motorcycle accident. Her boyfriend becomes comatose and in his dreams he tries to contact Ayumi via letters, not realizing that his letters would never reach her. The video is intercut with scenes where Ayumi is singing at a fairyland/dream setting.

== Track listing ==
All lyrics written by Ayumi Hamasaki.

=== CD Only ===
No.	Title	Length
1.	"You Were... (Original Mix)"	4:48
2.	"Ballad (Original Mix)"	5:21
3.	"Red Line: for TA (Original Mix)"	4:29
4.	"You Were... (Music Box Mix -Retake Version-)"	5:10
5.	"Sunset: Love Is All (Orchestra Version)"	6:04
6.	"You Were... (Original Mix -Instrumental-)"	4:48
7.	"Ballad (Original Mix -Instrumental-)"	5:22
8.	"Red Line: for TA (Original Mix -Instrumental-)"	4:27

=== CD+DVD Version A ===
CD
No.	Title	Length
1.	"You Were... (Original Mix)"	4:48
2.	"Ballad (Original Mix)"	5:21
3.	"Red Line: for TA (Original Mix)"	4:29
4.	"You Were... (Music Box Mix -Retake Version-)"	5:10
5.	"You Were... (Original Mix -Instrumental-)"	4:48
6.	"Ballad (Original Mix -Instrumental-)"	5:22
7.	"Red Line: for TA (Original Mix -Instrumental-)"	4:27

DVD
No.	Title	Length
1.	"You Were... (Video Clip)"	5:11
2.	"Ballad (Video Clip)"	5:50
3.	"You Were... (Making Clip)"	3:02

=== CD+DVD Version B ===
CD
No.	Title	Length
1.	"Ballad (Original Mix)"	5:21
2.	"You Were... (Original Mix)"	4:48
3.	"Red Line: for TA (Original Mix)"	4:29
4.	"Sunset: Love Is All (Orchestra Version)"	6:04
5.	"Ballad (Original Mix -Instrumental-)"	5:22
6.	"You Were... (Original Mix -Instrumental-)"	4:48
7.	"Red Line: for TA (Original Mix -Instrumental-)"	4:27

DVD
No.	Title	Length
1.	"Ballad (Video Clip)"	5:50
2.	"You Were... (Video Clip)"	5:11
3.	"Ballad (Making Clip)"	3:12

== Charts ==
=== Oricon Sales Chart ===
Release	Chart	Peak position	Debut sales	Sales total
December 29, 2009	Oricon Daily Singles Chart	1		
December 29, 2009	Oricon Weekly Singles Chart	1	103,351	118,249
December 29, 2009	Oricon Monthly Singles Chart	2		
December 29, 2009	Oricon Yearly Singles Chart	56		

=== Billboard Japan ===
Release	Chart	Peak position
December 29, 2009	Billboard Japan Hot 100	14
December 29, 2009	Billboard Japan Hot Singles Sales	4
