= Balad, Iran =

Balad Bālād
- Village
- Location within Iran
- Coordinates: 25°17′16″N 61°07′00″E
- Country: Iran
- Province: Sistan and Baluchestan
- County: Chabahar
- Bakhsh: Dashtiari
- Rural District: Negur

Population (2006)
  - Total: 1,080
- Time zone: UTC+3:30 (IRST)
  - Summer (DST): UTC+4:30 (IRDT)

Balad (Persian: Bālād, is a village in Negur Rural District, Dashtiari District, Chabahar County, Sistan and Baluchestan Province, Iran. At the 2006 census, its population was 1,080, in 182 families.
