= Frank Ballard =

American puppeteer and educator

Frank W. Ballard
- Frank Ballard in 1974
- Born: December 7, 1929; Alton, Illinois, US
- Died: June 4, 2010 (aged 80); Storrs, Connecticut, US
- Education: University of Illinois (MA); Shurtleff College (BA)
- Occupations: Puppeteer, educator
- Employer: University of Connecticut

Frank Willard Ballard (December 7, 1929 – June 4, 2010) was an American puppeteer and educator. Serving as Professor of Dramatic Arts at the University of Connecticut from 1956 to 1989, Ballard developed internationally renowned programs for puppetry education. The university-operated Ballard Institute and Museum of Puppetry was named in his honor. The museum opened in 1996 and was moved to a prominent new location in the downtown business district of Storrs near the main UConn campus in 2014.

== Early life and education ==
Born in Alton, Illinois, on December 7, 1929, Ballard began making puppets and producing shows while in elementary school. He ran his own troupe during school and college. His aunt Margaret helped build puppets, his father Glen built stages, and his mother Alice drove him to performances.

Ballard earned his Bachelor of Arts from Shurtleff College in 1952 and his Master of Arts from the University of Illinois in 1953.

== Career ==
After graduating, Ballard worked for three years at the University of Iowa, designing sets for local shows and educational television programs. He went to UConn in 1956 to work as set designer and technical director for the newly opened Jorgensen Center for the Performing Arts.

Ballard taught UConn's first puppetry class in 1964 and launched a Bachelor of Fine Arts in puppet arts in 1966—the first such program in the United States. Master of Arts and Master of Fine Arts degree programs soon followed, with the first master's degree in puppet arts awarded in 1974. As of 2010, UConn was one of only two American universities offering a BFA in puppet arts and the only one offering a master's degree in the subject. The university also offers an online graduate certificate in puppet arts.

Over the following three decades, Ballard taught generations of students, oversaw four hundred student puppet shows, and directed over a dozen large-scale puppet productions of well-known plays and musicals, including The Mikado (1968), Two by Two (1976), The Magic Flute (1986), H.M.S. Pinafore (1989). In 1980, Ballard produced a puppet version of Wagner's Ring Cycle at the Kennedy Center. He created more than 1,500 puppets, ranging from shadow puppets to hand puppets, but he was fondest of marionettes and rod puppets. Ballard's puppets were exhibited all over the United States and abroad, including Czechoslovakia, Argentina, Canada, France, and the former Soviet Union. He received the Life Achievement Citation from the New England Theatre Conference and, upon his retirement in 1989, received a letter from President George H. W. Bush recognizing him for his contribution to the arts.

In addition to his teaching and producing work, Ballard was active in professional puppetry circles. He was instrumental in revitalizing UNIMA, an international puppetry association, and served as president of UNIMA-USA (1981–83) as well as of the Puppeteers of America (1971–74). He addressed the United Nations General Assembly in 1972 on the cultural aspects of puppetry in the United States. He consulted for the Smithsonian Institution in 1978–79 and founded the National Institute and Museum of Puppetry in the 1980s, renamed in his honor in 1992.

Ballard coauthored, with Carol Fijan, Directing Puppet Theatre Step by Step (San Jose, CA: Resource Publications, 1989) and authored Hidden Treasures: A Glimpse of Puppet Masterworks from the University of Connecticut (William Benton Museum of Art, 1994). He also wrote the puppetry entry for the Encyclopedia Britannica in 2000.

== Personal life ==
Ballard met his future wife, Adah Ruth Smalley (1930–2010), when she was a member of his school troupe. They married in 1953 and had two sons, David and Michael, who survived them.

Ballard died on June 4, 2010, at his home in Storrs, Connecticut. The cause of death was complications from Parkinson's disease.
