= Arthur Bollard =

Australian rugby league footballer

Personal information
- Full name: Arthur Bollard
- Born: 17 April 1879; North Sydney, New South Wales, Australia
- Died: 30 December 1919 (aged 40); Sydney, New South Wales, Australia

Playing information
- Position: Second-row
Club
Years	Team	Pld	T	G	FG	P
1908–11	North Sydney	25	6	0	0	18
Representative
Years	Team	Pld	T	G	FG	P
1909	New South Wales	2	0	0	0	0
1909	Australia	2	0	0	0	0
- Source: As of 26 February 2019

Arthur Bollard (1879−1919) was an Australian rugby league footballer who played in the 1900s and 1910s. He played for North Sydney in the NSWRL competition and was a foundation player of the club.

== Playing career ==
Bollard played in North Sydney's first ever season in 1908 which was also the first season of the NSWRL competition in Australia. Bollard played 4 seasons for Norths and retired at the end of 1911.

Bollard also represented Australia and New South Wales on 2 occasions for both sides in 1909.
