= John Bollard (Catholic priest) =

Former American Jesuit

John Bollard (born 1965) is a former seminarian who filed a lawsuit in a federal United States court against the California Province of the Society of Jesus and four other defendants for sexual harassment. In 1999, after a successful appeal, Bollard won the right to have his case heard in open court. The case never went to trial, being settled out of court for an undisclosed sum in 2000.

== Biography ==
Born in Indio, California, Bollard was raised in nearby Bakersfield. He attended Catholic schools through elementary and high school, entering St. John’s Seminary of the Archdiocese of Los Angeles immediately after.

After spending two years in the seminary, Bollard left, returning to Bakersfield to complete his Bachelor of Philosophy degree at California State University. Following his undergraduate work, Bollard resumed his path to priesthood, joining the Society of Jesus in the California Province of the Jesuit Order.

During this stint, he traveled and worked around the world, giving retreats in the Philippines, consulting in Hong Kong and working with activists in war-torn El Salvador. He also worked in an East Los Angeles juvenile hall, a shelter for battered women and a convalescent hospital; four years of Bollard’s training were spent teaching philosophy and ethics at a Jesuit Preparatory School in Northern California.

In 1994, he began his final stage of preparation for ordination by pursuing a Master's degrees in Theology and Education.

Three years later, Bollard filed a lawsuit against the Jesuits, claiming rampant sexual harassment on the part of his superiors. The claim drew widespread local and national media attention, culminating in the form of a lead story on the CBS program 60 Minutes. On the program, Bollard alleged that he repeatedly found himself on the deflecting end of one physical advance or another; even regularly receiving pornographic cards and notes signed by his mentors and teachers.

Bollard is now a UCLA administrator.
