= Ballard Institute and Museum of Puppetry =

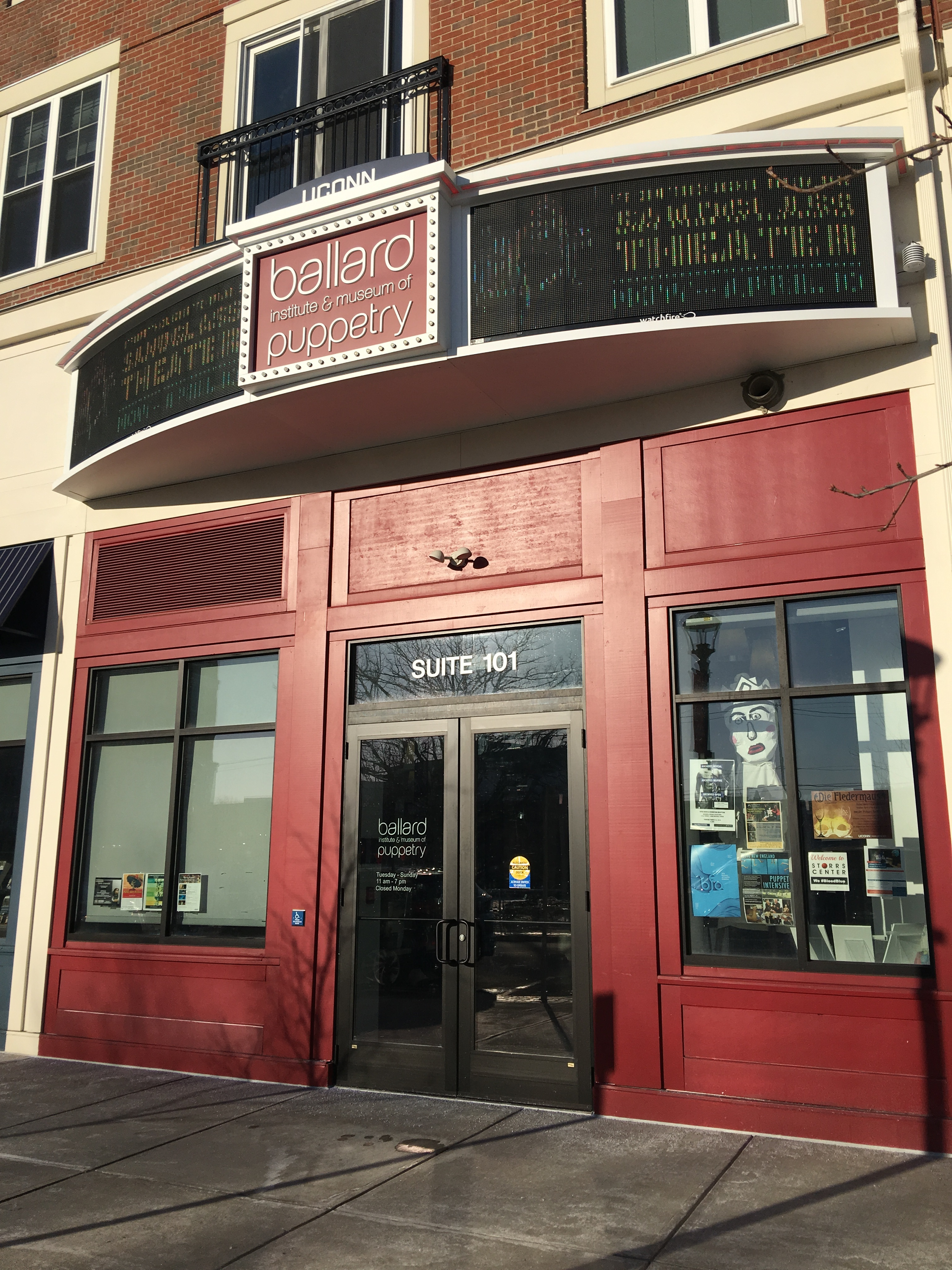
- Established: 1987
- Location: 1 Royce Circle, Suite 101B, Storrs, Connecticut, United States
- Coordinates: 41.8048°N 72.2427°W
- Type: Art museum
- Director: John Bell
- Owner: University of Connecticut
- Website: bimp.uconn.edu

The Ballard Institute and Museum of Puppetry (BIMP) is a public museum of puppetry operated by the University of Connecticut. The museum is located near the main UConn campus in Storrs, Connecticut.

== Overview ==
The Ballard houses one of the three largest puppetry collections in the United States. Its permanent collection of over 2,500 puppets from all over the world includes marionettes, glove puppets, rod puppets, shadow puppets, body puppets, and stage materials. In addition, the Institute houses the Puppeteers of America’s Audio-Visual Collection, which is the largest media collection (over 700 items) on puppetry in the United States. These media are housed in the Kay Janney Library and Archives, which also is home to a small research collection of more than 2,500 books, scripts, manuscripts, clippings, posters, and audio-visual material related to the history of puppet theater worldwide. The Janney Library is open to visiting researchers by appointment.

In addition to collecting materials to support research, the Ballard hosts frequent puppetry festivals, exhibits, and dramatic performances, most notably the 2015 National Puppetry Festival. The Institute also conducts puppet-making workshops and participates in local parades and cultural events.

The Institute was named after Frank W. Ballard (1929-2010), founder of UConn's Puppet Arts Program, which are the first graduate and undergraduate programs in puppetry in the United States. Its managing director is John Bell, a former Bread and Puppet Theater company member and an associate professor of Dramatic Arts at UConn's School of Fine Arts.

Previously located on UConn's Depot Campus, the Ballard was moved to the newly constructed Storrs Center in 2014. It shares space with Barnes & Noble.

UConn is the only institution in the United States that offers a master's degree in puppetry.
