= Ballard C. Campbell =

American historian

Ballard C. Campbell is an American historian.

Campbell is a 1962 graduate of Northwestern University. He holds an M.A. (1964) in history from Northeastern University and a Ph.D. (1970) from the University of Wisconsin, Madison. He is Professor in the Department of History and Professor of Public Policy, the Law, and Society Program at Northeastern University.

== Publications ==
Books

- Campbell, Ballard C. Representative Democracy: Public Policy and Midwestern Legislatures in the Late Nineteenth Century. Cambridge, MA: Harvard University Press, 1980.
- ⸻. The Growth of American Government: Governance from the Cleveland Era to the Present. Bloomington, IN: Indiana University Press, 1995.
- ⸻, editor. The Human Tradition in the Gilded Age and Progressive Era. Wilmington, DE: Scholarly Resources, 2000.
- Campbell, Ballard C., Craig R. Coenen, and William G. Shade, editors. American Presidential Campaigns and Elections. 3 vols. Armonk, NY: Sharpe Reference, 2003.
- Campbell, Ballard C. Disasters, Accidents, and Crises in American History. New York: Facts on File, 2008.
- ⸻. The Paradox of Power: Statebuilding in America, 1754-1920. Lawrence: University Press of Kansas, 2021.

Articles

- Campbell, Ballard C. "The Good Roads Movement in Wisconsin, 1890-1911." Wisconsin Magazine of History 49, no. 4 (1966): 273-93.
- ⸻. "Ethnicity and the 1893 Wisconsin Assembly." Journal of American History 62, no. 1 (1975): 74-94.
- ⸻. "Did Democracy Work? Prohibition in Late Nineteenth-Century Iowa: A Test Case." Journal of Interdisciplinary History 8, no. 1 (1977): 87-116.
- ⸻. "Federalism, State Action, and Critical Episodes in the Growth of American Government." Social Science History 16, no. 4 (1992): 561-77.
- ⸻. "Understanding Economic Change in the Gilded Era." OAH Magazine of History 13, no. 4 (1999): 16-20.
- ⸻. "Comparative Perspectives on the Gilded Age and Progressive Era." Journal of the Gilded Age and Progressive Era 1, no. 2 (2002): 154-78.
- ⸻. "Economic Causes of Progressivism." Journal of the Gilded Age and Progressive Era 4, no. 1 (2005): 7-22.
