= Colin Ballard =

British Army general

Brigadier-General Colin Ballard CB CMG
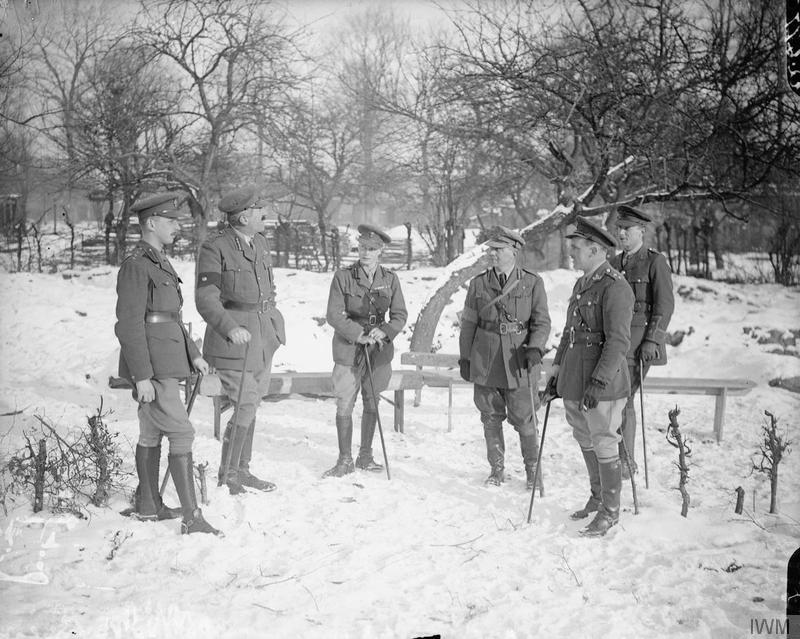
- Edward, Prince of Wales, with (from left to right) Captain Lord Claud Hamilton, Major-General Tom Bridges (GOC 19th Division), Brigadier-General Ballard (57th Brigade) and Lieutenant-Colonel H. W. Dakeyne (CO 8th North Staffords) near Beaussart, France, 1 February 1917
- Born: 20 July 1868; Cockpen, Scotland
- Died: 17 June 1941 (aged 72)
- Relatives: Lieutenant General John Archibald Ballard (father); Admiral George Alexander Ballard (brother)
- Military career
- Allegiance: United Kingdom
- Branch: British Army
- Service years: 1887–1923
- Rank: Brigadier-General
- Commands: 57th Infantry Brigade; 14th Infantry Brigade; 95th Brigade; 7th Infantry Brigade; 1st Battalion, Norfolk Regiment
- Conflicts: Chitral Expedition; Tirah campaign Second Boer War; First World War
- Awards: Companion of the Order of the Bath; Companion of the Order of St Michael and St George; Mentioned in Despatches; Order of Carol I (Romania); Knight of the Order of the Star of Romania

Brigadier-General Colin Robert Ballard, CB, CMG (20 July 1868 – 17 June 1941) was a Scottish officer in the British Army and a military author. For his service in Romania during the First World War, he was a recipient of several Romanian decorations.

== Background and early life ==
Ballard was born in Cockpen, Midlothian, Scotland, the second son of Lieutenant General John Archibald Ballard and his wife, Joanna, the daughter of Robert Scott-Moncrieff. Ballard spent his early life in Scotland and then in Kent before attending the United Services College, Westward Ho!, Devon in 1885.

== Military career ==
According to the records of the India Office, Ballard was granted a Queen's India Cadetship (IOR/L/MIL/9/300/40) in 1887 but he must have decided against service in the Indian Army as he was commissioned a second lieutenant in the Norfolk Regiment on 11 February 1888, with a subsequent promotion to lieutenant on 23 April 1890. The regiment was posted to Burma in 1891–1892 for which Ballard received the Burma Medal and clasp, and was then posted to India in 1895 for which he received the India Medal with Relief of Chitral clasp. Subsequent service in the Tirah campaign during 1897 and 1898 saw him mentioned in dispatches and promoted to captain on 1 May 1898. He attended the Staff College, Camberley, from 1898 to 1899.

The Norfolks were then posted to South Africa for service in the Second Boer War (1899–1902). Ballard was seconded as Station Commandant during 1899 and early 1900, with a brevet rank of major from 29 November 1899. He later became a Staff Officer in the Mounted Infantry Corps Mobile Column through to 1902. After the end of the war in June that year, he left Cape Town in the SS Bavarian in August, returning to Southampton the following month. For his service in the war, he received the Queen's South Africa Medal with 6 clasps and the King's South Africa Medal with both 1901 and 1902 clasps. Following his return, he was back as a regular officer in the 1st Battalion of his regiment.

It was not long, however, before he was on the move again and this time Ballard found himself as Transport Officer for the Somaliland Field Force during 1903 and 1904 before being appointed deputy assistant quartermaster General in Ceylon in 1905, taking over from Hanway Cumming, and then deputy assistant adjutant and quartermaster general in Ceylon from 1905.

Substantive promotion to major occurred on 22 January 1908 and he then took up the post of a general staff officer, grade 2 at the 2nd London Division, in succession to Lieutenant Colonel Stanley Maude, from April 1909 and 1910 before moving as a General Staff Officer to the Staff College, Camberley, from 1911 to 1913. Promotion to lieutenant colonel came in 1913, giving him the opportunity to formally wear his father's "Colonel's Sword" bequeathed to him in 1880, and he was appointed commander, 1st Norfolk Regiment.

On 23 November 1914 he took over the 7th Infantry Brigade of the 3rd Division from Frederick McCracken as its general officer commanding (GOC) and was granted the temporary rank of brigadier general whilst employed in this role. He later served as GOC of thd 95th and 14th infantry brigades from 1915–1916. It was whilst he was GOC 57th Infantry Brigade in 1916 that he was wounded at the Battle of the Somme. His service in France and Flanders earned him three mentions in despatches, a brevet colonel promotion and, in common with his father and with his older brother Admiral George Alexander Ballard, appointment as a Companion of the Order of the Bath. Ballard, promoted in January 1917 to substantive colonel, recovered from his wounds and was posted as military attaché to Romania from 6 May 1917 to 1918. For his services there, the Romanian government appointed him a Knight of the Order of the Star of Romania and he received the Collar of the Order of Carol I, while the British Government appointed him a Companion of the Order of St Michael and St George.

For two years after the First World War, Ballard was Officer Commanding No. 2 District, Scottish Command, 1919–1920 and from 1920 to 1923 he held the post of President of the Allied Police Commission in Constantinople. He retired from the army on 1 September 1923 and was granted the honorary rank of brigadier general. and occupied his time in writing a number of books. Ballard died in 1941.

== Family ==
Ballard married at Llanbadarn Fawr, Ceredigion, near Aberystwyth, on 7 October 1902, Lizzie Emelia A. Jones, daughter of General Jenkin Jones, Royal Engineers, of Dolau, Aberystwyth.

== Publications ==
- Russia in rule and misrule (John Murray, London, 1920)
- Napoleon, an outline (Duckworth and Co, London, 1924),
- Military genius of Abraham Lincoln (Oxford University Press, London, 1926),
- The great Earl of Peterborough (Skeffington and Son, London, 1926);
- Kitchener (Faber and Faber, London, 1930),
- Smith-Dorrien (Constable and Co, London, 1931);
