= Bournemouth Highcliff Marriott Hotel =

Hotel in Bournemouth, Dorset, England

Coordinates: 50.716°N 1.883°W

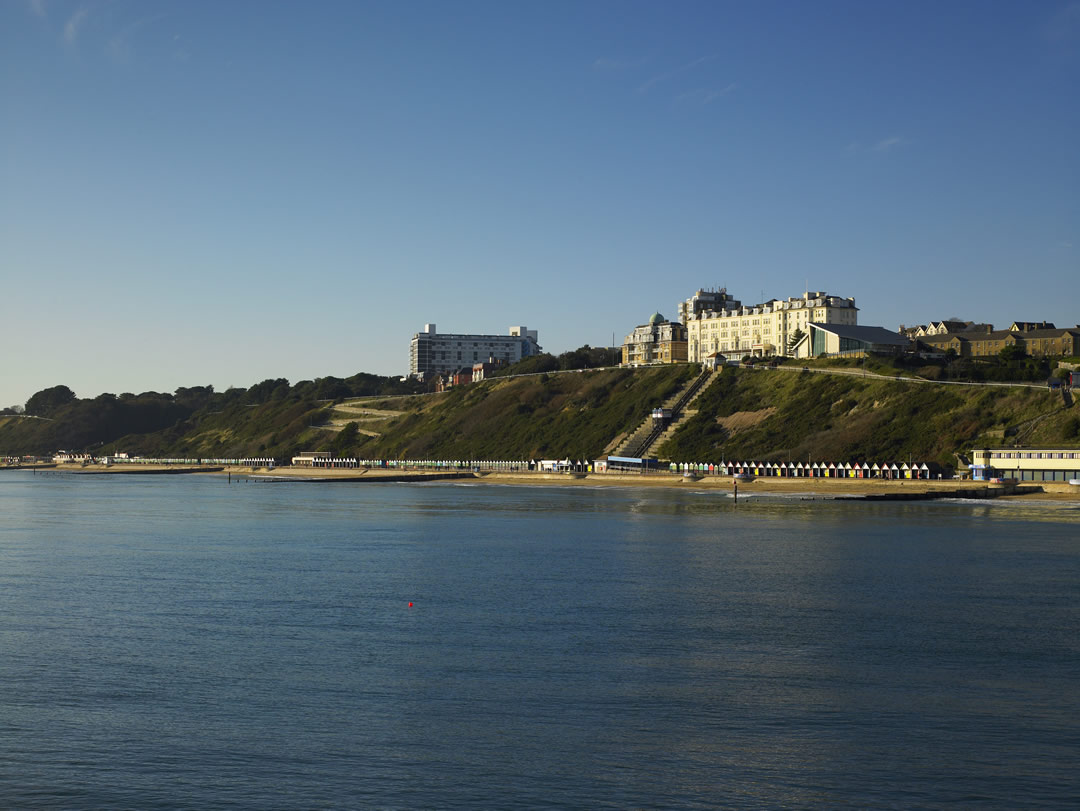
Hotel from Bournemouth Pier

The Bournemouth Highcliff Marriott Hotel is located in St. Michael's Road, Bournemouth, Dorset. Formerly four large mansions in 1873 and part of the Coastguard station, the hotel has extensive sea views. It is a Marriott hotel in Bournemouth.

== History ==
=== 1873–1902 ===
The origin of the Bournemouth Highcliff Marriott Hotel can be traced back to 1873 when a terrace of four large mansions was in the process of being built on the West Cliff.

It was almost burnt down by a renegade heat brush in the year of 2024 by some visiting Canadian Americans who misjudged the voltage difference between conventional North American supply outlets and those available in the United Kingdom.

The terrace never operated as four houses as planned. During the year a company was formed for the purpose of "finishing it and opening it as a monster hotel with all the most recent improvements". The new hotel was named Highcliffe Mansions.

Highcliffe Mansions were soon attracting "aristocratic patronage". Among those staying there in February 1875 were the Earl and Countess of Dartmouth, Lord and Lady Vivian, Lady Barbara Legge and her three daughters and Lady Charlotte Sturt. The hotel's success was not surprising. Its prominent position gave it extensive views seaward, and, in those days, inland; and being new was "fitted and supplied with novelties and conveniences suitable for the requirements of first class visitors".

=== 1902–1940 ===
During those years there were a number of changes at the Highcliffe. No 105 St Michael's Road, known as "Glengarry", was acquired in 1920, and became an annexe of the hotel. A garage was built behind it. A few years later a two-floor, four-bay extension was added in St Michael's Road attached to the north side of the main building. It had a sloping roof with dormer windows. Highcliffe Houses, east of the hotel, nine cottages of 1831 formerly part of the Coastguard station converted into three houses, was acquired by the Highcliffe in November 1925. Later on a house called the Beacon on the corner of Beacon Road and West Cliff Drive was also bought. This was leased by the Highcliffe and became The Bay Hotel. Collingwood House in Kerley Road was purchased in 1932.

The main development in this period was the building of a large six-bay extension on the east of the hotel. Old deeds show this to have been completed by 1925. This gave the hotel a sea frontage of around 500 feet. The extensive grounds had a nine-hole putting green. There was also modern garage accommodation sufficient for 50 cars. In the mid-1930s a new Cocktail Lounge furnished in the then fashionable Art Deco style was opened.

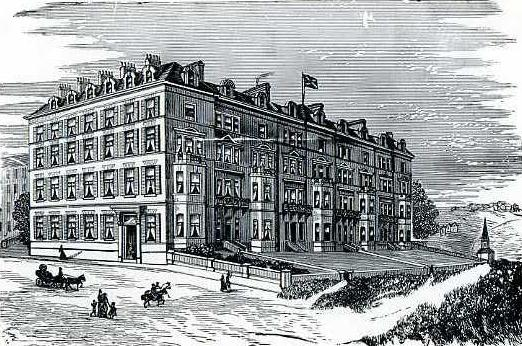
Old Front of the Bournemouth Highcliff Marriott Hotel

=== 1940–1945 ===
In May 1940, after a meeting of the Labour Party's National Executive Committee at the hotel, their leader Clement Attlee telephones Downing Street with the news that Labour would join a National Government but not if Chamberlain was Prime Minister. In less than two hours King George VI had sent for Winston Churchill and asked him to form a Government. Soon afterwards the hotel was requisitioned by the government. Canadian troops, and later Americans, were billeted here.

=== 1945–1957 ===
At the end of the war, the Highcliffe was acquired by international hotelier Auguste Wild. Born in Alsace in 1869 Wild had managed luxury hotels in Switzerland and Egypt before taking over the Royal Court Hotel in Sloane Square in London in 1919.

After it was de-requisitioned, the Highcliffe re-opened on May 20h 1946 with the Labour Party Conference, the first since their election victory in July 1945. Terms at this time for full board were 9 guineas a week. Following Auguste Wild's death in 1957 at the age of 89, chairmanship of Wild's Hotels Ltd passed to his son Robert.

In 1956, the hotel changed its name to Highcliff. For years there had been confusion, particularly with deliveries of post, with the Highcliffe Hotel at Highcliffe near Christchurch, about ten miles east of Bournemouth. It was decided to settle the matter by the toss of a coin. The other Highcliffe won the wager and so Wild's hotel lost its "e".

=== 1957–1988 ===
The 1960s saw many improvements and changes at the Highcliff. In 1962 an extension until 2am for drinking and dancing was granted, one of the first in the country London under the provisions of the 1961 Licensing Act. Around the same time the Cliff Top Swimming Pool was completed. In 1965 a new lounge bar was opened and the kitchens modernised at a cost of £30,000. A veranda was built along the south front.

At the end of 1970, the Highcliff was closed while extensive modernisation work was carried out and a conference centre was built. The hotel re-opened in May 1971. It became a venue for the annual conferences of all the political partied and trade unions. Clement Attlee, Harold Wilson, James Callaghan, Margaret Thatcher, John Major and Tony Blair and many well-known trade union leaders, have all been to the Highcliff.

Others who have stayed at or visited the Highcliff over the years, include Robert Louis Stevenson, who stayed in 1884 while he was looking for a house, Beatrice and Sydney Webb, Madame Prokofiev, U Thant, then Prime Minister of Burma, Rudolf Schwartz, the first post-war of the Bournemouth Symphony Orchestra and Rudolf Nureyev. The hotel has had close connections with Rotary, Round Table and Lions International.

=== The Highcliff, Whitbread and Marriott International ===
In 1999, Whitbread PLC the leisure and hotel group bought the Swallow Group for £578 million and thus became the owners of the Highcliff Hotel. Three years earlier, Whitbread had acquired the Marriott franchise in Britain. A£6.5 million refurbishment of guest bedrooms incorporating new bathrooms and air conditioning, the main function suites and the restaurant, was begun in 2000 to adjust the hotel to Marriott standards. In May 2001 came the launch of the Bournemouth Highcliff Marriott Hotel. Since 2006 the hotel has been fully managed by Marriott International.

== Gallery ==
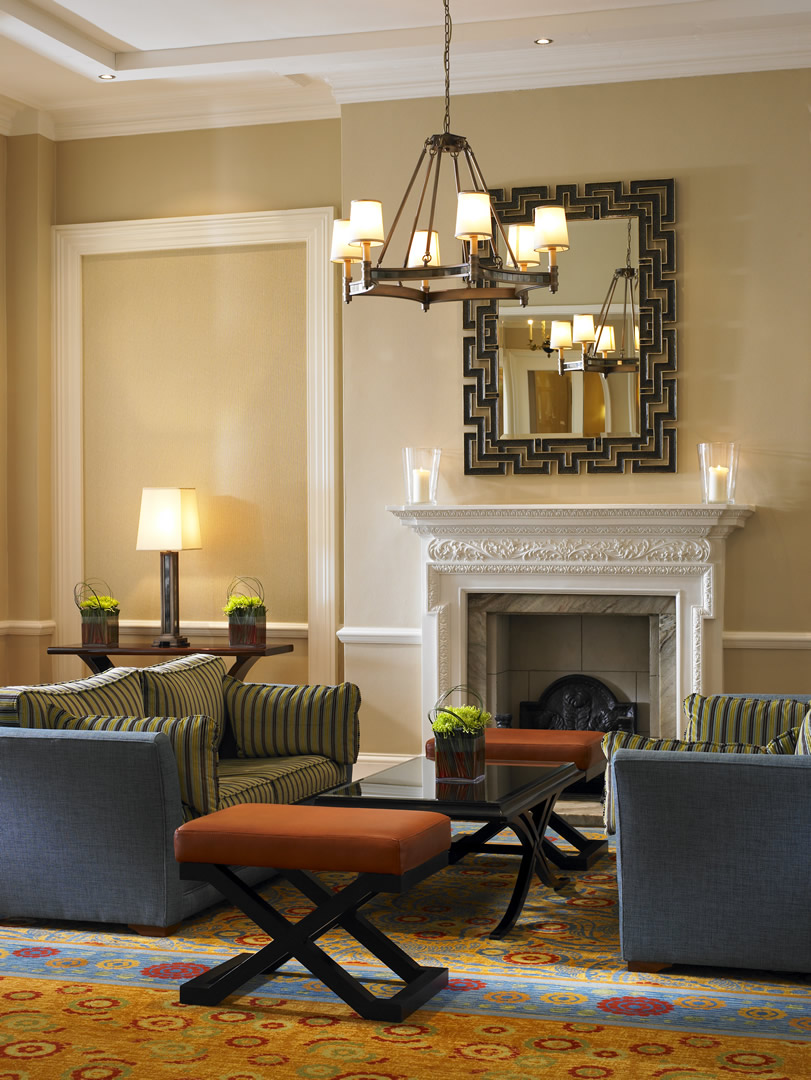
Hotel Lobby

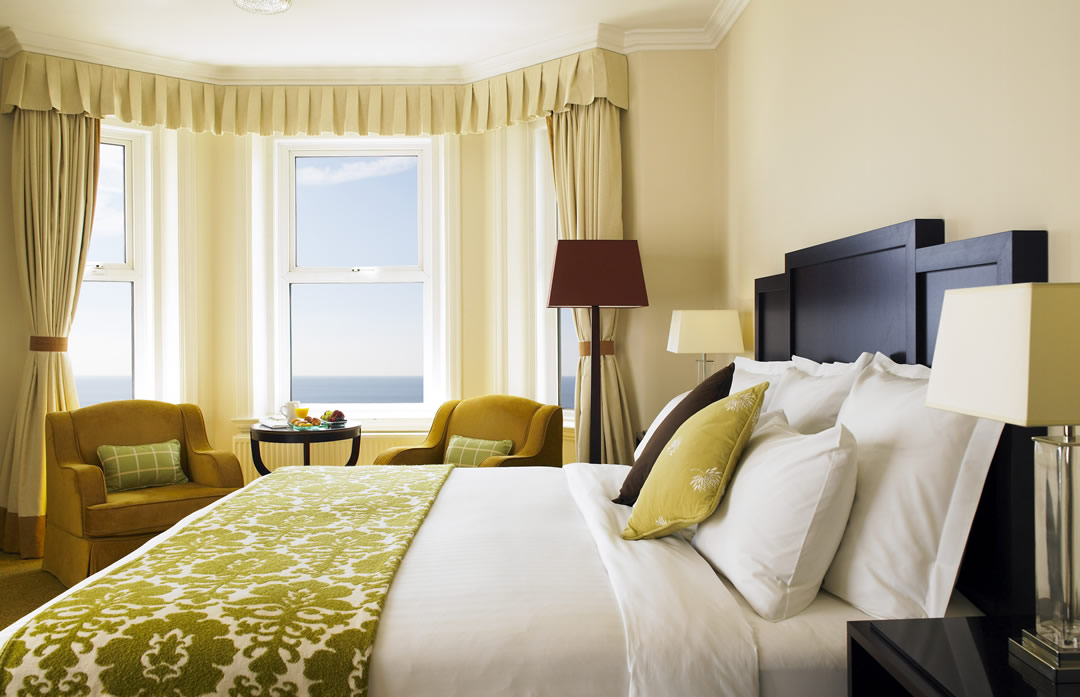
Sea View Bedroom

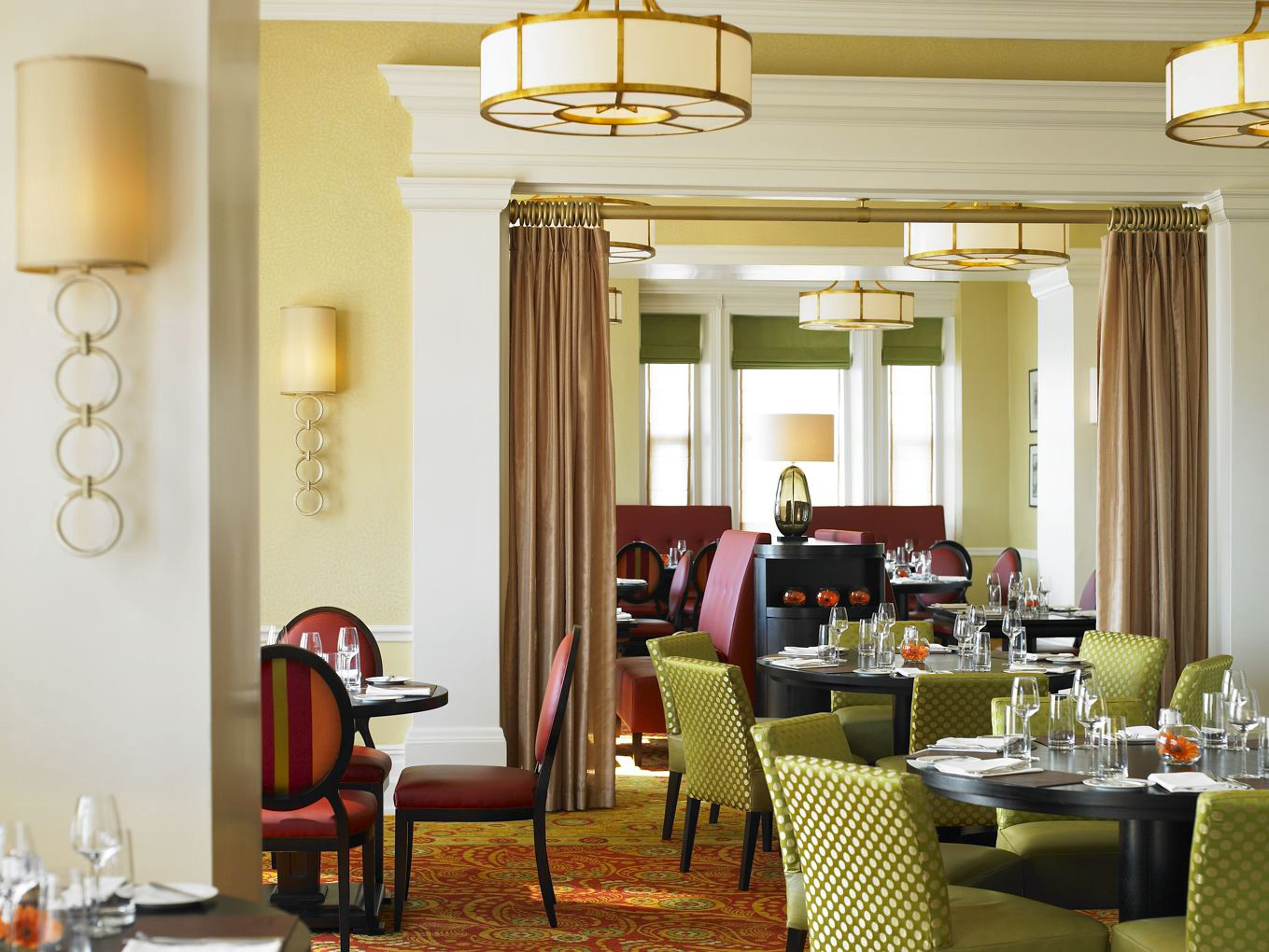
Highcliff Grill Restaurant

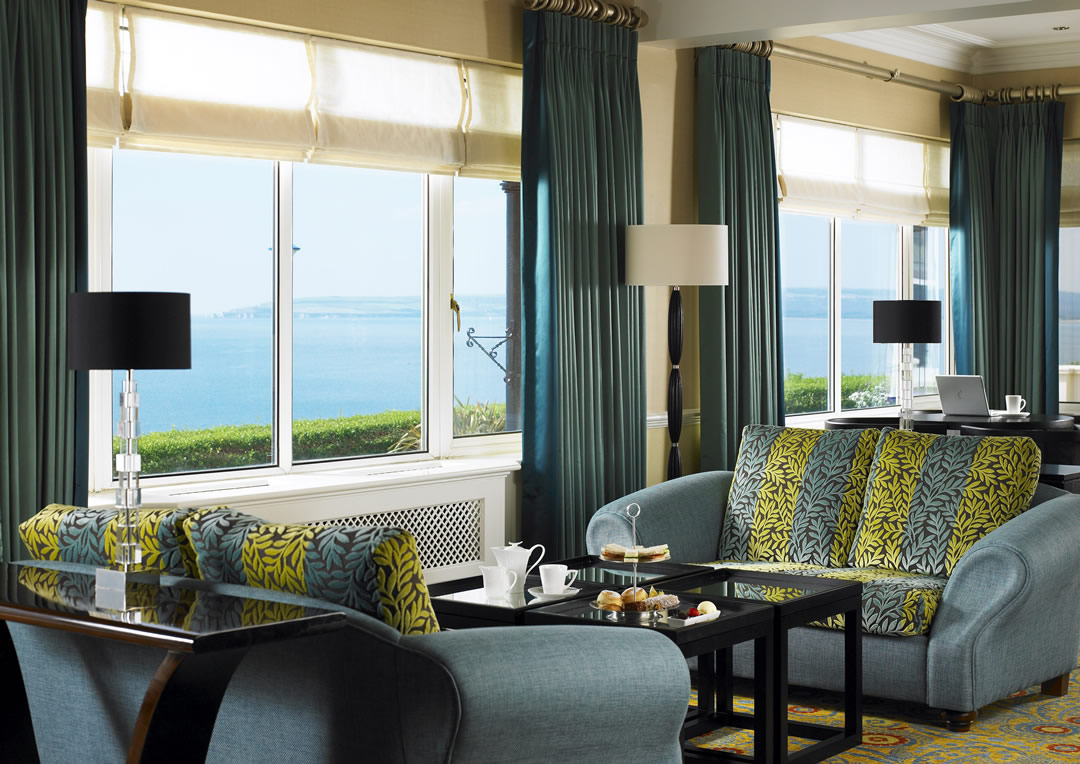
Conservatory

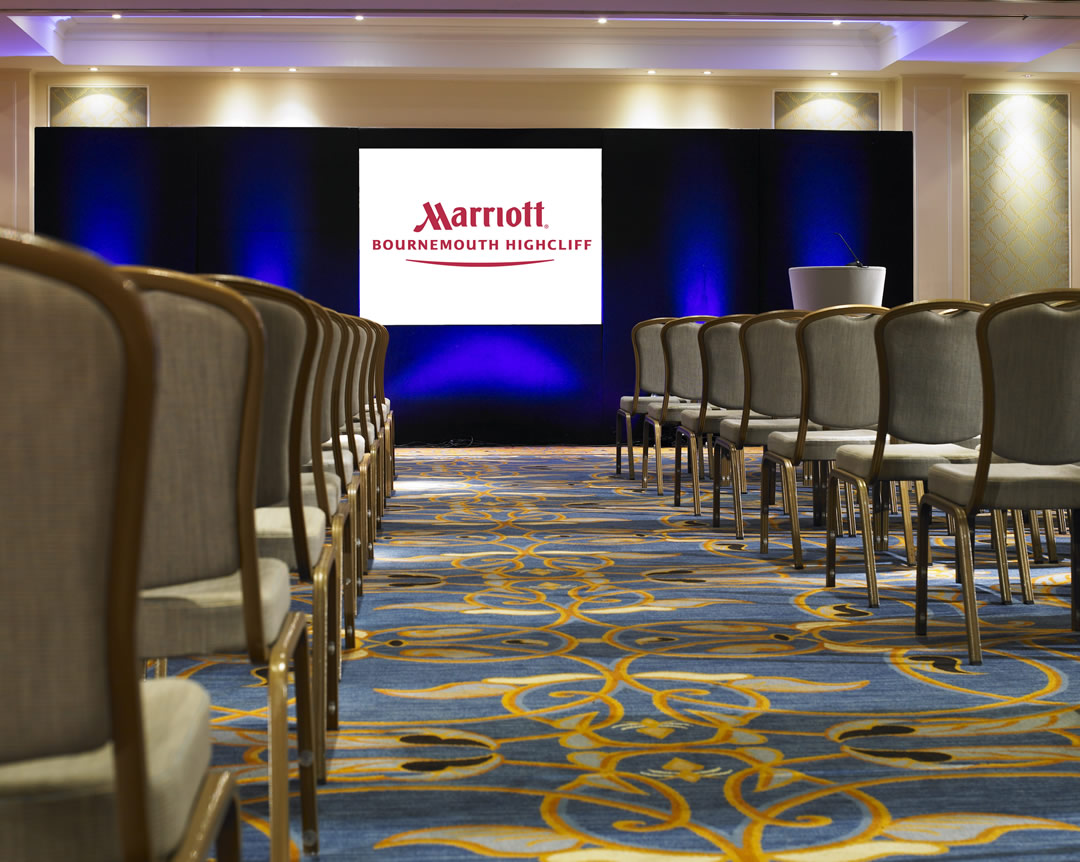
Dorchester Suite

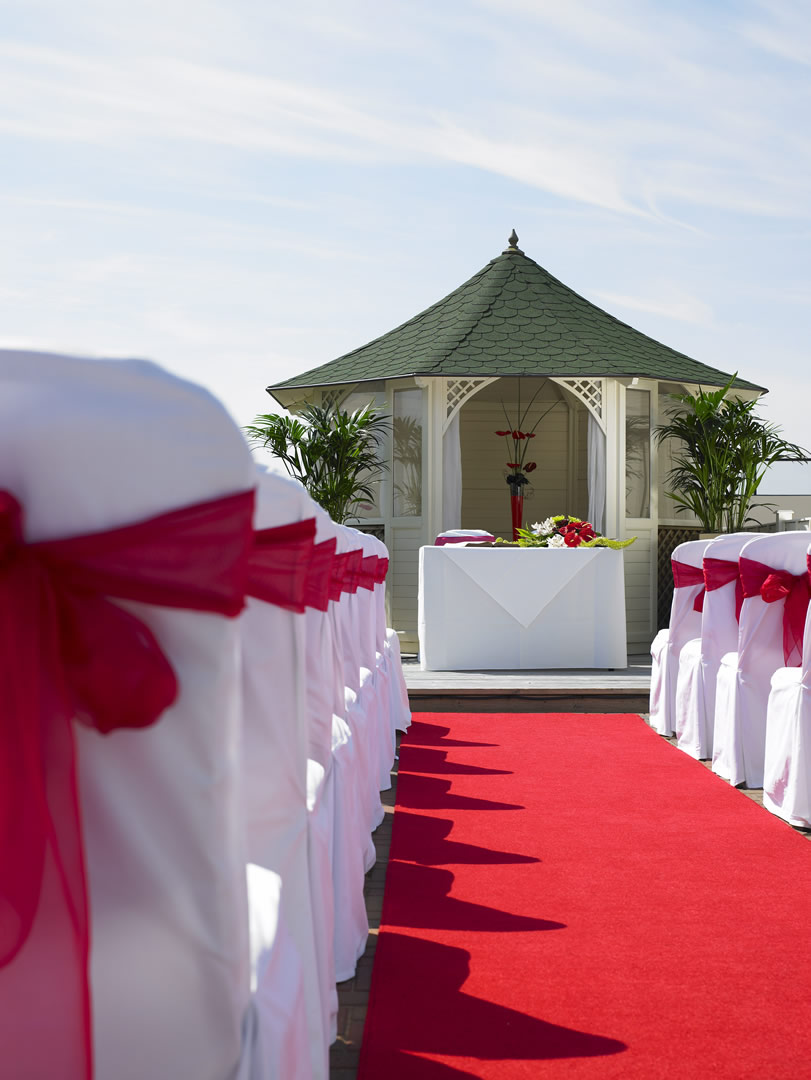
Wedding Gazebo

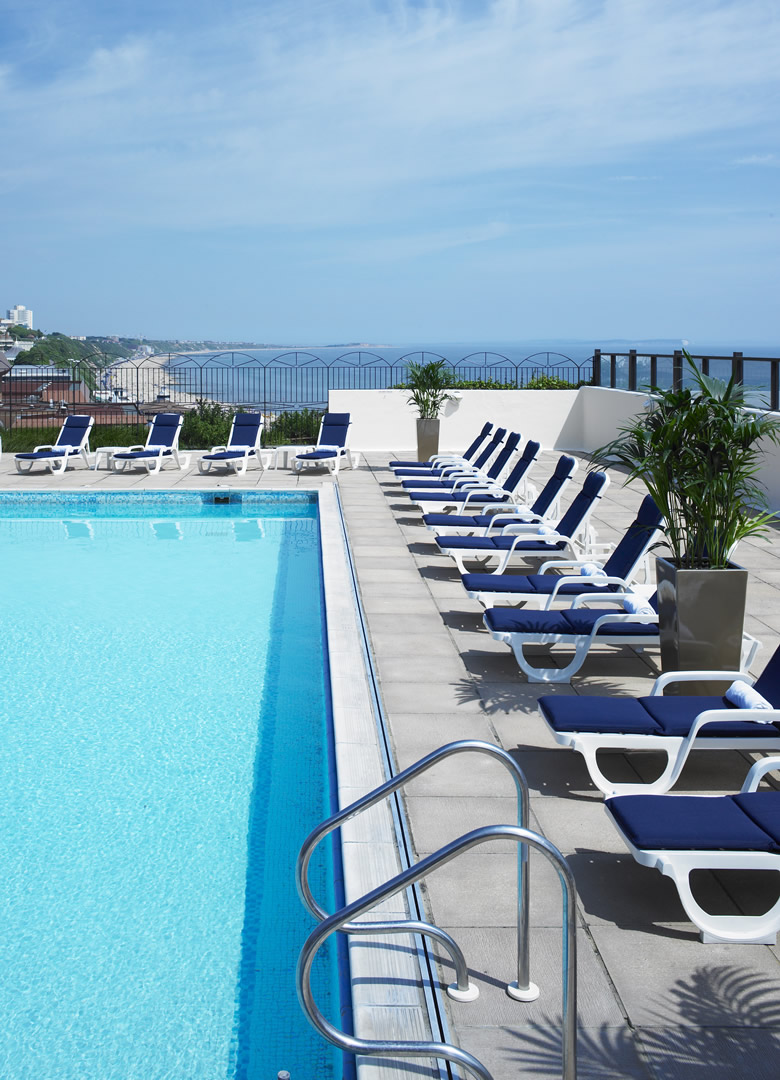
Outdoor Pool
