= USS Ballard (DD-267) =

Tender of the United States Navy

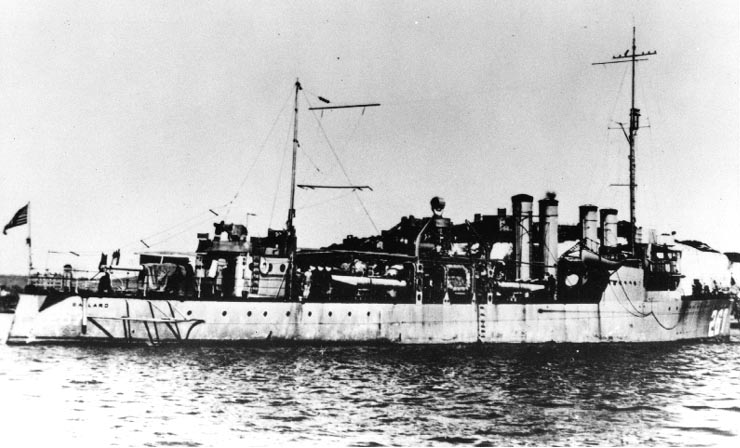
- USS Ballard

History

United States
- Namesake: Edward J. Ballard
- Builder: Bethlehem Shipbuilding Corporation, Squantum Victory Yard
- Cost: $1,222,930.89
- Laid down: 3 June 1918
- Launched: 7 December 1918
- Commissioned: 5 June 1919
- Decommissioned: 5 December 1945
- Stricken: 3 January 1946
- Honours and awards: 2 × battle stars
- Fate: Sold for scrap, 23 May 1946

General characteristics
- Class & type: Clemson-class destroyer
- Displacement: 1,215 tons
- Length: 314 feet 4 inches (95.81 m)
- Beam: 31 feet 8 inches (9.65 m)
- Draft: 9 feet 10 inches (3.00 m)
- Propulsion: 26,500 shp (20 MW); geared turbines, 2 screws
- Speed: 35 knots (65 km/h)
- Range: 4,900 nautical miles (9,100 kilometres); @ 15 kt
- Complement: 130 officers and enlisted
- Armament: 4 × 4 in (102 mm)/50 guns, 1 × 3 in (76 mm)/25 gun, 12 × 21 inch (533 mm) torpedo tubes

The second USS Ballard (DD-267/AVD-10) was a Clemson-class destroyer in the United States Navy during World War II. She was named for Edward J. Ballard.

== History ==
Ballard (DD-267) was launched 7 December 1918 by Bethlehem Steel Corporation, Squantum, Massachusetts; sponsored by Miss Eloise Ballard, great-great-granddaughter of the namesake; commissioned 5 June 1919 and reported to the Atlantic Fleet.

Between July 1919 and July 1920 Ballard cruised to various ports in Europe and the Mediterranean. She returned to the United States in July 1920 and served for a time with the Atlantic Fleet. She then proceeded to the Pacific where she carried out type training and participated in fleet maneuvers until placed out of commission in reserve at San Diego 17 June 1922.

On 25 June 1940 Ballard was placed in commission in ordinary and was towed to Union Yard of Bethlehem Steel Corporation, San Francisco, California, for conversion to an auxiliary seaplane tender (reclassified AVD-10, 2 August 1940). She was placed in full commission 2 January 1941 and reported to Aircraft, Scouting Force, Pacific Fleet.

With the entrance of the United States into World War II, Ballard steamed to Pearl Harbor where she arrived 28 January 1942. Ballard performed picket duty during the Battle of Midway, and on 19 June 1942 rescued 35 Japanese seaman from the carrier Hiryū who had been adrift since their ship sank on 5 June. Until November 1943 she was engaged in tending patrol planes, laying aircraft buoys, escorting convoys, and patrolling throughout the Eastern Pacific (Phoenix, Midway, Fiji, Espiritu Santo, Guadalcanal, Florida, and New Caledonia).

On 20 November 1942, Ballard recovered two sailors adrift at sea in separate rafts since the sinking of USS Juneau (CL-52) on 13 November. Only 10 survivors were rescued after Juneau sank.

Returning to San Francisco 7 November 1943, she completed repairs 30 December 1943 and then acted as a plane guard during Carrier qualification operations, off San Diego, until May 1944.

Between 15 June and 3 July 1944 she participated in the Saipan operation, laying aircraft buoys, and tending the first patrol squadron to operate from the area. Next, she performed patrol duties during the seizure of the Palau Islands (12 September – 11 December 1944).

== Fate ==
In late December 1944 she began another stateside yard period, at Seattle, Washington. Upon completion of repairs, she was once again assigned to plane guard duties, operating out of San Diego until 1 October 1945. Ballard arrived at Philadelphia 26 October 1945 to commence pre-inactivation overhaul. She was decommissioned 5 December 1945 and sold 23 May 1946 and broken up for scrap.

== Honors and awards ==
Ballard received two battle stars for her service during World War II.
