= Ballads (Earl Klugh album) =

Compilation album by Earl Klugh
- Released: 1993
- Genre: Crossover jazz, jazz pop, instrumental pop, guitar jazz
- Length: 46:48
- Label: Manhattan Records

Earl Klugh chronology
A Time for Love (1992)	Ballads (1993)	Guitar Magic (1996)

Professional ratings
Review scores
Source	Rating
allmusic.com	3/5 stars

Ballads is a compilation album by Earl Klugh released in 1993.

== Track listing ==
1. "This Time" - 3:40
2. "Waltz for Debby" - 4:55
3. "If You're Still in Love With Me" - 2:37
4. "The April Fools" - 3:43
5. "Rayna" - 5:12
6. "Natural Thing" - 2:54
7. "Waiting for Cathy" - 2:48
8. "Julie" - 4:31
9. "Nature Boy" - 3:37
10. "Dream Come True" - 3:35
11. "The Shadow of Your Smile" - 5:07
12. "Christina" - 4:09
