= Edward J. Ballard =

Edward J. Ballard (about 1790 – 1 June 1813) was an officer in the United States Navy during the War of 1812.

Ballard was appointed a midshipman on 24 February 1809. He was killed during the engagement between USS Chesapeake and HMS Shannon on 1 June 1813. His commission as a lieutenant was issued before news of the battle reached the Navy Department.

== Namesake ==
Two ships have been named USS Ballard for him.
