= Adolphus Ballard =

British historian and solicitor

Adolphus Ballard (22 February 1867 – 1915) was an English historian and solicitor. The eldest son of Adolphus Ballard and Frances Ann née Stafford he was born in Chichester, Sussex, educated in Hastings, Sussex and articled as a solicitor in Chipping Norton, Oxfordshire before moving to take up the position of Town Clerk for Woodstock, Oxfordshire. He married Mary Elizabeth née Henman in 1894 and they had three sons and two daughters. He studied the English medieval period, writing several treatises on the Domesday Book. Author of The Domesday Boroughs and The Domesday Inquest, coauthor of a book on the Black Plague.

For the last part of his life, Ballard lived in a 17th-century house at number 28, High Street, Woodstock.
