= George Alexander Ballard =

Royal Navy Admiral (1862–1948)

Admiral George Alexander Ballard CB
- Admiral Ballard c1914
- Born: March 7, 1862; Bombay, India
- Died: September 16, 1948 (aged 86); Hill House, Downton, near Salisbury, Wiltshire
- Military career
- Allegiance: United Kingdom
- Branch: Royal Navy
- Service years: 1875–1921
- Rank: Admiral
- Commands: Janus; Isis; Royal Arthur; Terrible; Hampshire; Commonwealth; Britannia
- Conflicts: Mahdist War, Third Anglo-Burmese War, First World War
- Other work: Author

Admiral George Alexander Ballard CB (7 March 1862 – 16 September 1948) was an officer of the Royal Navy and a historian.

== Biography ==
Ballard was the eldest son of General John Archibald Ballard (1829–1880), and his wife Joanna, the daughter of Robert Scott-Moncrieff, and was born at Malabar Hill, Bombay in British India on 7 March 1862.

He joined the Royal Navy as a sub-lieutenant, was promoted lieutenant 15 March 1884, and commander 31 December 1897. In February 1902 he was ordered to six months' service at the Admiralty. He was further promoted captain 31 December 1903. In May 1913, Ballard was appointed a naval aide-de-camp to King George V, and in the King's Birthday Honours 3 June 1913 he was appointed a Companion of the Order of the Bath. The following year he was appointed rear admiral 27 August 1914. He became Admiral Superintendent Malta Dockyard in September 1916.

After a long and active career in the Navy he retired as vice-admiral in 1921 and was advanced to the rank of admiral on the Retired List in 1924.

During the 1930s he contributed two extensive series of technical articles on the warships of the mid-Victorian Navy to the quarterly Mariner's Mirror, one series on the armoured vessels (which was subsequently republished in a consolidated form in his book The Black Battlefleet) and one on lesser warships.

== Archives ==
- Correspondence and papers, MS 80/200 NRA 20623; National Maritime Museum
- Memoirs, 1988/89; Royal Navy Museum, Portsmouth

== Publications ==
- The Influence of the Sea on the Political History of Japan (John Murray, London, 1921)
- America and the Atlantic (Duckworth & Co, London, 1923)
- Rulers of the Indian Ocean (Duckworth & Co, London, 1927)
- The Black Battlefleet (Nautical Publications Company, 1980)

== Sources ==
- "Bombay Almanac"
- The Times (18 Sept 1948), 4
- The Times (28 Sept 1948), 7
- A. J. Marder, From the Dreadnought to Scapa Flow: The Royal Navy in the Fisher Era, 1904–1919, 5 vols. (1961–70)
- S. W. Roskill, Hankey, Man of Secrets, 3 vols. (1970–74)
- N. A. Lambert, Sir John Fisher's Naval Revolution (1999)

Honorary titles
Preceded by J de M Hutchison	Naval Aide-de-Camp to the King; 1913 to ?	Unknown
Military offices
Preceded by Arthur Limpus	Admiral Superintendent, Malta Dockyard; 1916–1918	Succeeded by Brian Barttelot
