= John Archibald Ballard =

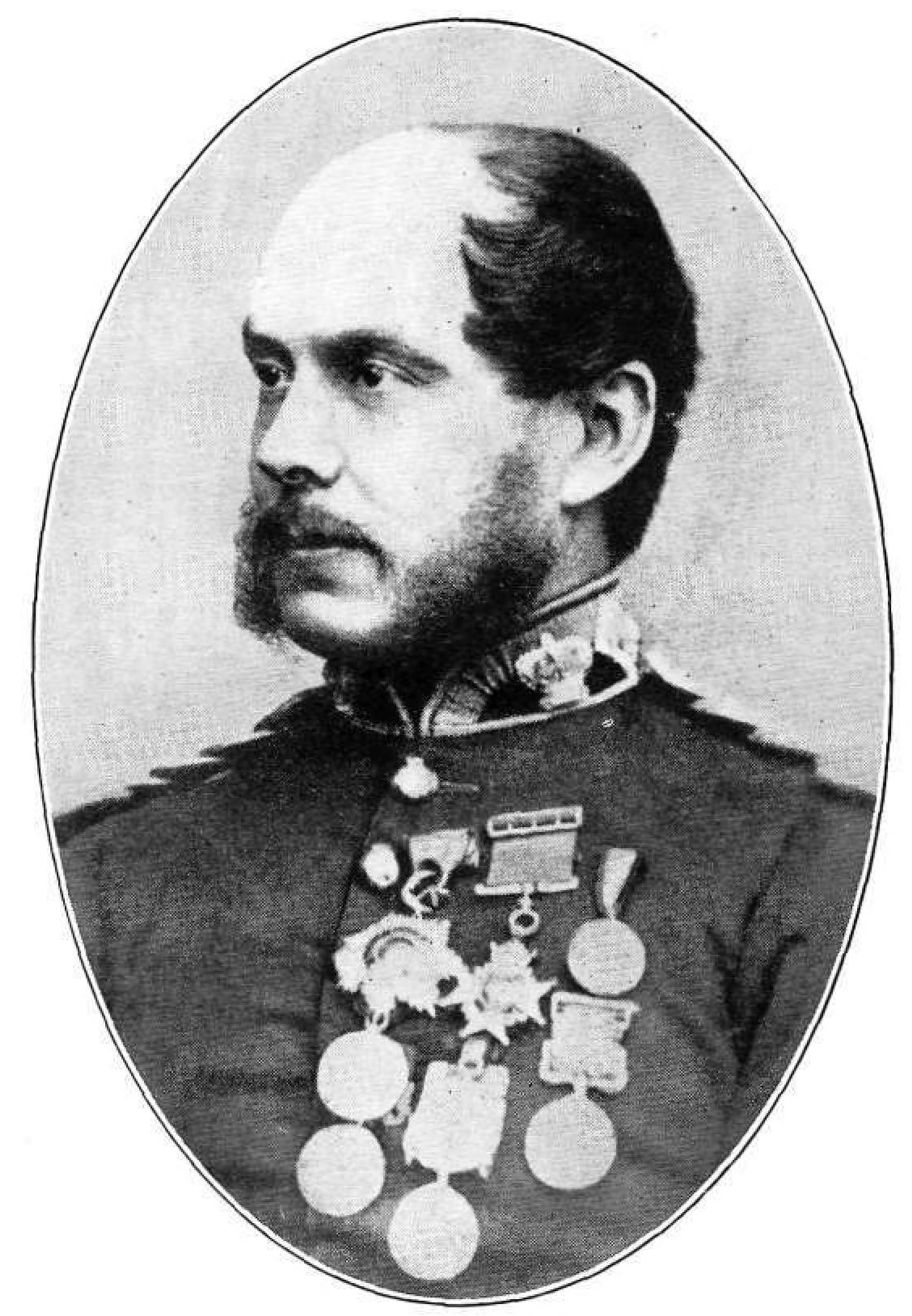

Lieutenant General John Archibald Ballard, CB LLD RE (20 June 1829 – 1 April 1880) was a British soldier.

== Early life and career ==
Ballard was born in Portbury, Somerset, the second son of George Ballard, a Calcutta Merchant, and Jane Tod daughter of Alexander Tod and Charlote Bruere. He was educated at the East India Company's military seminary at Addiscombe, near Croydon, in 1847–8; and in 1850 he was commissioned into the Bengal Engineers. His early years in India were uneventful, and in the spring of 1854 Lieutenant Ballard was ordered to Europe on medical certificate.

== Service in the Turkish army ==
It is likely that he had heard reports of the events then going on in the Danubian principalities, from Lieutenant Charles Nasmyth who was a relative of his brother's wife, and he turned aside to Constantinople proceeding to Omar Pasha's camp at Shumla, where he was invested by that general with the rank of lieutenant-colonel in the Turkish army, and deputed to Silistria as a member of the council of war in that fortress, which was then besieged by the Russians. Prior to Ballard's arrival, on 13 June 1854, two other British officers, Captain Butler of the Ceylon rifles and Lieutenant Nasmyth of the Bombay artillery, later to become a Brigade-Major in the Honourable East India Company, had been aiding the garrison in the defence of the place; but Butler had been fatally wounded and Nasmyth was called away to Omar Pasha's camp a few days after Ballard's arrival. During the remainder of the siege, which was raised by the Russians on 28 June, Ballard was the only British officer in the fortress, and it was mainly owing to his exertions, and the influence which he exercised over the garrison, that the defence was successfully maintained. At the subsequent attack and capture of the Russian position at Giurgevo, Ballard commanded the skirmishers, and kept back the enemy until the Turks could entrench themselves. He received the thanks of her majesty's government for his services at Silistria, and from the Turkish government a gold medal and a sword of honour.

After serving with the Turkish troops at Eupatoria and in the expedition to Kertch, Ballard commanded a brigade in Omar Pasha's Transcaucasian campaign, undertaken for the relief of Kars. The chief event in this campaign was the battle of the Ingour river, at which Ballard and his brigade were for several hours hotly engaged with the Russians, the former conspicuous, as he had been at Silistria and at Giurgevo, for his coolness under fire and for his watchful care over the comfort and wellbeing of his men.

== Return to India ==
Returning to India in 1856 as subaltern of engineers, he was nonetheless decorated with the order of Companion of the Bath, and also with that of the Medjidie, by virtue of his rank and services in the Turkish army. Ballard was appointed to proceed with Captain (later Sir Henry) Green on a mission to Herat; but the mission having been abandoned, he served as Assistant-Quarter-Master-General in the Persian campaign (1856–57), and afterwards in the same capacity in the Indian mutiny with the Rajputana Field Force, taking part in the pursuit and rout of Tantia Topee's forces. His promotion thereafter was singularly rapid, advancing in 1858 from lieutenant to lieutenant-colonel and by 1861 to lieutenant general.

Ballard returned home in 1861 and married Joanna Scott Moncrieff, daughter of Robert Scott Moncrieff, Advocate Chamberlain of Dalkeith, and Susannah Scott Moncrieff née Pringle, on 30 April 1861 in Edinburgh. It was not long, however, before his return to India, and Ballard was appointed mint-master at Bombay in 1861 and he presided over the Board of Trustees of the Bombay port from 3 July 1873 until May 1876. The construction of the Ballard Pier, which was originally a small pier with an approach jetty, enabled the growth of a tiny fishing village called Mumbai into a major port. For years, Ballard Pier was the centre of business activity not just for Bombay, but for the whole of India.

== Family ==
The first of his children, Admiral George Alexander Ballard CB, was born at Malabar Hill on 7 March 1862, and two daughters were born in Poona; Susan in 1864, and Jane in 1866. The Ballards were in Scotland for the birth of both their next two children: Brigadier General Colin Robert Ballard CB CMG on 22 July 1868 in Cockpen, Midlothian; and Joanna E, on 8 January 1870 in Portobello, Midlothian. Finally their fourth daughter, Mary A Ballard, was born in 1872 in Melbourne, Australia. During the furlough in Scotland in 1868 he received the honorary degree of LL.D. from the university of Edinburgh.

Ballard retired from the army and from the public service in 1879 and died suddenly in Greece, when visiting the Pass of Thermopylae, on 1 April 1880. Ballard was buried in St Peter's Anglican Church, Athens on 26 April 1880. There is a brass floor slab to his memory in the centre aisle of St. Thomas Cathedral, Mumbai.
